= List of defunct airlines of the United States (J–P) =

The following is a list of defunct airlines of the United States. However, some of these airlines have ceased operations completely, changed identities and/or FAA certificates and are still operating under a different name (e.g. America West Airlines changed to use the identity of US Airways in 2005 – which itself also changed identity to American Airlines in 2015).

For reasons of size, this article is broken into four parts:

- List of defunct airlines of the United States (A–C)
- List of defunct airlines of the United States (D–I)
- List of defunct airlines of the United States (J–P)
- List of defunct airlines of the United States (Q–Z)

Airline	State or territory	Image	IATA	ICAO	Callsign	Hubs and focus cities	Commenced operations	Ceased operations	Notes
J
Jamaire	Arkansas					Harrell Field	1979	1982	
Janair				JAX	JANAIR		1988	1988	
Janss Airways	Utah					Salt Lake City	1966	1969	Renamed Sun Valley Airlines
Jefferson	Minnesota					Minneapolis	1928	1928	Operated Ford Trimotor
Jet 24	Florida		TJ	JTS		Miami	1979	1986	
Jet Alaska	Alaska					Anchorage	1985	1985	
Jet America	California		SI	JET		Long Beach	1981	1987	Merged into Alaska Airlines
Jet Aviation				BZF	BIZFLEET		1999	1999	
Jet Charter				JCT	JET CHARTER		1997	1998	
Jet Charter Jets	Nevada					Las Vegas McCarran	1994	1994	
Jet Courier	Ohio			DWW	DON JUAN	Cincinnati/Northern Kentucky	1974	1985	Renamed Wright International Express
Jet East International	Texas			JED	JET EAST	Dallas Love Field	1983	2000	Renamed Express One International
Jet Express	Virginia		JI	JEX	JETEX	Charlottesville–Albemarle	1983	1993	Established as Bader Express. Become the last Midway Airlines
Jet Fleet International Airlines	Texas			JFC	JET-FLEET	Dallas/Fort Worth	1969	1992	
Jet Freight Cargo	Florida			JED	JET EAST	Miami	1977	1980	Renamed Concord
Jet Hansa Corporation	Florida		XW	WRC		West Palm Beach	1967	1975	Charter flights. Operated Hansa Jet. Renamed Walker’s Cay Airlines
Jet U.S.	Michigan					Detroit	1993	1993	Operated one week
Jet Way	Michigan			JWY		Willow Run	1970s	1984	Acquired by Kalitta Air
JetAmerica	Florida		J1	BSK	BISCAYNE	Toledo Express	2007	2009	As Air Azul
Jetstream International Airlines	Ohio			VNA	JETSTREAM INTERNATIONAL	Dayton	1983	1995	Established as Vee Neal Airlines. Renamed PSA Airlines
JetTrain	New York			JTN	JETTRAIN	Newark Liberty	1994	1996	Established as AirTrain Airlines
JetWest	Colorado					Denver	1969	1970	Absorbed by Frontier Airlines (1950–1986)
Jetwest International	California					Los Angeles	1994	1995	Charter operator
Jetwest International Airways	Nevada					Las Vegas McCarran	1981	1982	Renamed Sunworld International
Jetwingsco	Florida					Fort Myers	2001	2004	Operated Cessna Citation I, Gulfstream III
Jim Dodson Air Service	Alaska					Anchorage	1937	1943	Acquired by Ray Petersen Flying Service
Jim Hankins Air Services	Mississippi		HQ	HKN	HANKINS	Jackson	1958	2009	
Johnson Airways	Louisiana					New Orleans	1932	1933	Established as The Gulf Coast Airlines
Johnson Flying Service	Montana		JF	JF	JOHNSON SERVICE	Missoula	1924	1975	Sold to Evergreen Helicopters in 1975 to create Evergreen International Airlines
Jolly Voyager Travel Club							1970	1974	Air travel club. Operated DC-7
Juneau Air Service	Alaska					Juneau	1980	1980	RenamedWard Air
Juneau Air Taxi Service	Alaska					Juneau	1953	1951	Renamed Loken Air Charter
K
K-T Flying Service	Hawaii					Honolulu	1934	1941	Founded by Charles Knox and Robert Tyce
Kahili Airlines (Trans National Airlines of Hawaii)	Hawaii		NX			Honolulu	1979	1981	
Kansas City Southern Skyways	Kansas		NX			Kansas City	1945	1949	Cargo carrier. Operated C-47
Kenai Air Alaska	Alaska					Kenai	1978	1987	Established as Kenai Air Service
Kenai Air Service	Alaska					Kenai	1977	1978	Founded by Vernon L. Lofsted. Renamed Kenai Air Alaska
Kenai Aviation								2025	
Kenmore Air Harbor	Washington					Kenmore	1946	1981	Renamed Kenmore Air
KentuckySkies	Kentucky					Owensboro–Daviess	2009	2012	A Pacific Wings subsidiary
Ketchikan Air Service	Alaska		6S			Ketchikan	1997	1998	Acquired by Taquan Air
Ketchikan Airways	Alaska					Ketchikan	1933	1993	Established as Pioneer Airways
Key Air	Utah			KEY	KEY AIR	Salt Lake City	1987	1989	Charter carrier
Key Airlines	Idaho			KWY	KEYAIR	Savannah/Hilton Head	1969	1993	Established as Thunderbird Airlines
Key West Airlines	Florida					Key West	1980	1981	
Keyway Air Transport						Rhein-Main Air Base	1986	1992	
KeyWest Seaplane Service	Florida					Key West	1976	1997	Adventure tours carrier. Operated Cessna 206
King Airlines	Texas					Wichita Falls	1965	1972	Commuter air services. Operated Aero Commander 680, Piper Aztec, Cherokee Six
Kingman Aviation	Arizona					Kingman	1973	1982	
Kitty Hawk Aircargo	Indiana		KR	KHA	KITTYHAWK	Fort Wayne	1985	2008	Formed as Kitty Hawk Airways
Kitty Hawk Airways	Texas		2K	KHA		Dallas Love Field	1978	1990	
Kitty Hawk International	Michigan		CB	CKS		Cincinnati/Northern Kentucky	1999	2000	To Kalitta Air
Kiwi International Air Lines	New Jersey		KP	KIA	KIWI AIR	Newark Liberty	1992	1999	Went bankrupt
Knowles Air-Ways	Michigan					Flint	1933	1935	Operated Ford Trimotor
Kobrin Airways	New Jersey					Princeton	1982	1982	Operated Piper Navajo
Kodiak Airways	Alaska					Kodiak	1960	1973	Merged with Western Alaska Airlines
Kodiak Island Air	Alaska					Kodiak	1995	1998	
Kodiak Western Alaska Airline	Alaska					Kodiak	1973	1982	Formed by the merger of Kodiak Airways and Western Alaska Airlines. Operated Grumman Goose
L
L.A.B. Flying Service	Alaska		JA	LAB	LAB	Haines	1956	2008	
L'Express Airlines	Louisiana			LEX	LEX	New Orleans Louis Armstrong	1989	1992	
LA Helicopter	California					Los Angeles	1986	1989	Operated Ecureuil 2
La Posada Airways	Texas					Laredo	1967	1969	Scheduled commuter services. Operated Britten-Norman Islander
Lake Central Airlines	Indiana		LC			Cleveland Hopkins	1950	1968	Began as Turner Airlines. To Allegheny Airlines
Lake Geneva Airways	Wisconsin					Lake Geneva	1970	1973	
Lake Havasu Air Services	Arizona			HCA	HAVASU	Lake Havasu City	1970s	1970s	Regional carrier
Lake State Airways	Minnesota		NT			New Ulm	1977	1979	Renamed Midwest Aviation
Lake Union Air Service	Washington					Lake Union Seaplane Base	1946	1993	To Kenmore Air
Lakeland Airlines	Wisconsin		YQ	LKL	LAKELAND	Rice Lake	1980	1984	
Laker Airways Inc.	Florida		6F	LKR	LAKER	Fort Lauderdale	1995	1999	Was a US-registered airline established as a sister company to Laker Airways Bahamas
Lance Air Transport	Florida						1962	1965	Operated C-46, DC-6A, DC-7
Landair International Airlines			BN	C29			1994	1994	Renamed Forward Air International Airlines
Lang Aire	Nevada					Las Vegas	1994	1998	Cargo carrier
Laredo Air	Texas			LRD	LAREDO AIR	Laredo	1988	1989	
Larry’s Flying Service			J6				1982	2006	
Las Vegas Airlines	Nevada		6G	EER		Las Vegas McCarran	1973	1987	
Laughlin Express	Nevada			LEP	LAUGHLIN EXPRESS	Laughlin/Bullhead	1992	1992	
Lavery Airways	Alaska					Fairbanks	1935	1987	Founded by William L. "Bill" Lavery. To Alaska Star Airlines
Lawrence Aviation				LAR	LAWRENCE		1992	1992	
LB Ltd.			LB	LAB			1999	2000	Established as Princess Vacations by Sir Freddie Laker. Renamed the original Princess Vacations
Lear JeTravel	Nevada					Reno Stead	1968	1969	Operated Learjet 23 and Learjet 24
Lebanon Airport Development Corp.	New Hampshire			LAD	LADCO-AIR	Lebanon	1975	1976	Operated Aero Commander
Leconte Airlines				LCA	LECONTE		1981	1981	
Legend Airlines	Texas		LC	LGD	LEGENDARY	Dallas Love Field	1996	2000	Flights commenced in 2000; went bankrupt
Leisure Air	North Carolina		L8	LWD	LEISURE WORLD	Chicago O'Hare	1992	1995	
Lemco Flying Services							1960	1964	Renamed Chatham Airlines
Liberty Air	Alaska					Anchorage	1984	1984	Formed by the purchase and merger of Air North and Valdez Airlines
Liberty Airlines	Ohio					Toledo Express	1982	1983	Operated Beech Baron and Convair 440
Liberty Express Airlines	Pennsylvania					Pittsburgh	1994	1997	To Air Midwest
Licon Airways							1933	1934	
Lincoln Air Service							1928	1932	
Lincoln Airlines				LUX	FREEBIRD		1989	1990	
Lindsay Aviation				LSY	LINDSAY AIR		2004	2006	
Lisle Air Service	California					Fresno Chandler	1965	1967	Commuter services. Operated Cessna 206
Livemercial Aviation	Delaware					Wilmington	2008	2012	Charter carrier
Logair	Ohio				LOGAIR	Wright-Patterson AFB	1954	1992	Air Force cargo virtual airline
Loening Air	Idaho					Boise	1963	1970	Commuter service. Operated Cessna 411
Loken Air Charter	Alaska					Juneau	1961	1964	Established as Juneau Air Taxi Service. Merged with Channel Flying Service
Loken Aviation	Alaska					Juneau	1954	1997	Renamed Alaska Seaplanes
Lon’s Flying Service	Alaska					Petersburg Johnson	1967	1967	Renamed Alaska Island Air. Operated DHC-2
Lone Star Air Cargo Lines	Texas					Dallas Love Field	1946	1947	irregular air carrier
Lone Star Airlines	Texas		AD	LSS	LONESTAR	Dallas/Fort Worth	1984	1998	Established as Exec Express II
Long Island Airlines	New York		YL	ORA	LONG ISLAND	Farmingdale	1987	1991	Established as Montauk Caribbean Airways. Sold and renamed Executive Airlines
Longhorn Airlines	Texas					Fort Worth Meacham	1965	1971	Commuter air services. Operated Piper Cherokee
LorAir	Arizona			LOR		Tucson	1995	2001	Charter carrier
Los Angeles Air Service	California					Los Angeles	1946	1960	Supplemental air carrier. Owned by Kirk Kerkorian from 1948. Renamed Trans International Airlines in 1960
Los Angeles Air Taxi Service	California					Los Angeles	1965	1970	Operated de Havilland Dove, Beech 18, Aero Commander 680
Los Angeles Airways	California					Grand Central Airport	1927	1928	
Los Angeles Airways	California		LX		LOS ANGELES	Los Angeles	1947	1971	
Los Angeles-San Diego Air Line	California					Los Angeles	1925	1925	Established by Ryan Airline. First scheduled airline in US
Louisa Flying Service	Virginia					Louisa	1995	2005	
Louisiana Aircraft	New Mexico					Albuquerque	1941	2003	Services for the U. S. Government. Renamed Ross Aviation
Lubbock-Amarillo Armored Service	Texas					Lubbock	1967	1971	Urgent deliveries carrier, Operated Piper Navajo
Lucerne Airways	California					Oakland	1931	1931	
Ludington Airline	Pennsylvania					Cleveland Hopkins	1929	1933	
Luthi Aviation	North Dakota					Fargo	1972	1974	Operated Beech C-45, Renamed Sizer Airways
Lynch Flying Service	Montana			LCH	LYNCH AIR		1967	1996	Commuter services. Operated Cessna 310, Cessna 337
Lynx Air International	Florida			LXF	LYNX FLIGHT	Fort Lauderdale	1989	2009	
Lynx Aviation	Colorado		L3	SSX	SHASTA	Denver	2006	2011	
M
Mac Dan Aviation	New Jersey			MCN	MAC DAN	Caldwell	2004	2006	
MAC Helicopters	Texas						1973	1973	
MAC McMullen Airways	Florida					Tampa	1920	1931	Daily passenger services. Operated Stinson
Mackey Airlines	Florida		MK	MK		Fort Lauderdale	1953	1967	To Eastern Air Lines. Founder started Mackey International in 1968
Mackey International	Florida		MI	MI		Fort Lauderdale	1968	1981	DBA Mackey International Air Taxi, then Mackey International Air Commuter then Mackey International Airlines
Maddux Air Lines	California					Mines Field	1927	1929	Merged with Transcontinental Air Transport to form TAT Maddux Air Lines
Magic Carpet Air							1961	1972	Air travel club. Renamed Traventure Air Travel Club. Operated Convair 440
Mahalo Air	Hawaii		BM	MLH	MAHALO	Honolulu	1993	1997	
Main Flying Services							1930	1931	
Maine Air	Maine					Bangor	1982	1983	Operated Piper Aircraft
Maine Air Cargo Express	Maine						1948	1949	
Maine Air Transport	Maine			MAT	MAINE AIR		1932	1933	
Maine Aviation	Maine			MAT		Portland Jetport	1962	2002	
Maine Coast Airways	Maine						1983	1992	
Maine State Airways	Maine					Augusta	1931	1931	
Majestic Air	Florida		QT	PIA		Miami	1988	1989	Renamed Carnival Air Lines. Operated a single Boeing 707-100
Majestic Airlines	Utah		2J	MAJ	MAGIC AIR	Salt Lake City	1988	1997	Operated Beech 99
Makani Kai Air	Hawaii					Honolulu	1998	2020	Merged into Mokulele Airlines
Mall Airways	New York		GH	MLS	MALL AIRWAYS	Albany	1973	1989	Merged into Business Express Airlines
Mamer Air Transport	Washington					Felts Field	1929	1932	Operated Ford Trimotor
Manhattan Airlines	New York					Syracuse	1974	1976	Operated DC-3
Mannion Air Charter	Michigan					Willow Run	1950s	1980s	Operated DC-3 and Beech C-45
Manufacturers Air Transport	Illinois					Chicago Midway	1967	1973	Operated C-47, Cessna 206 and Cessna 310
Marco Island Airways	Florida		LS			Miami	1973	1986	Merged into Provincetown-Boston Airlines
Marine Airways	Alaska					Juneau	1936	1939	Merged with Alaska Air Transport to form Alaska Coastal Airlines
Mario’s Air	Florida		M2			Miami-Opa-locka	1995	2006	Operated DC-3
MarkAir	Alaska		BF	MRK	MARKAIR	Anchorage	1946	1995	Merged into Northern Air Cargo
MarkAir Express	Alaska		BF	MRX	SPEEDMARK	Bethel	1987	1996	Established as Hermens Air. Acquired by MarkAir in 1987
Marquette Airlines							1938	1941	To Trans World Airlines
Marsh Airways	Alaska					Bethel	1934	1935	Founded by Ray Petersen
Marshfield Aviation	Massachusetts					Marshfield	1967	1971	Operated Cessna 172, Cessna 177 Cardinal, Cessna 337
Martz Air Lines	New York					Buffalo Niagara	1930	1933	Absorbed by American Airways
Maryland Airways	Maryland						1964	1968	Operated Beech 18
Mason & Dixie Air Lines	Michigan					Detroit	1929	1931	
Mass Air	Massachusetts					Boston	1964	1971	Founded by E. Antony. Acquired and merged intoExecutive Airlines
Massachusetts Airlines	Massachusetts					Boston	1949	1949	
MATS Cargo Airlines	Illinois					Chicago O'Hare	1972	1973	Scheduled and charter cargo operator
Matson Lines (airline)	California					San Francisco	1946	1948	Subsidiary of Matson Navigation shipping line. Inspired Ernest K. Gann's The High and the Mighty
Maui Airlines	Hawaii					Kahului	1985	1988	
Mauiva Air Tours	Florida					Kissimmee	2010	2014	Renamed ViaAir. Operated Embraer Brasilia
Maverick Airways	Texas					Maverick County	1974	1976	
Maverick Airways	Colorado					Denver	1996	1997	Founded by Cody Diekroeger. Operated DHC 7
Maverick International	New York		YG			New York Stewart	1977	1979	Operated three Boeing 707. Transported cattle to Iran
Mavrik Aire	Alaska					Kenai	1998	2007	Bush charter services
Max's Air Service	Wisconsin					Appleton	1947	1967	Founded by Max Sagunsky. Renamed Maxair
MAXjet Airways	Virginia		MY	MXJ	MAX-JET	Washington Dulles	2003	2007	
May Air Xpress	Texas			MXP	BEECHNUT		1990	2004	Founded by Thomas W. May
Mayflower Airlines	Massachusetts					Boston	1936	1945	Absorbed by Northeast Airlines
McClain Airlines	Arizona					Phoenix Sky Harbor	1984	1987	
McCollum Aviation	Illinois						1939	1986	
McCulloch International Airlines	California					Long Beach	1970	1977	McCulloch Properties bought Vance International Airways and merged w/ own operation.
McCulloch Properties	California					Long Beach	1964	1970	Aircraft had "Lake Havasu City" titles. Merged into McCulloch International Airlines.
McGee Airways	Alaska					Anchorage	1932	1934	Merged with Star Air Service
McKinley Air Service	Alaska					Talkeetna	2003	2003	Operated Cessna 185
Mel Air							1963	1971	Operated Cessna 402, Piper Aztec, Piper Apache
Mercer Airlines	California					Burbank	1950s	1975	intrastate airline and uncertificated carrier. Became Pacific American Airlines in 1975.
Mercury Air Lines	California					West Los Angeles	1919	1921	Operated Junkers-Larsen JL-6
Mercury Airlines	Texas					Houston-Hobby	1946	1947	
Meridian Air Cargo							1975	1979	Established as Key Brothers Flying Service
Merlin Express	Texas			MEI		San Antonio	1996	2000	Established as SAT-Air. Renamed Merlin Airways. Operated Swearingen Metroliner
Merrimack Air System	Massachusetts					Lawrence	1975	1978	Moved to Bedford and renamedMerimack Airlines
Merrimack Airlines	Massachusetts		ZE			Hanscom Field	1978	1980	Merged with New Jersey Airlines
Mesaba Airlines	Tennessee		XJ	MES	MESABA	Memphis	1944	2012	Merged into Pinnacle Airlines
Methow Aviation	Washington			MER	METHOW		1989	2006	
MetJet	Wisconsin					Green Bay–Austin Straubel	2013	2013	
Meteor Air Transport	New York					Teterboro	1946	1958	Supplemental air carrier; ceased operation after IRS seized assets.
Metro Air Northeast	New York		SS	MNE	NORTHEAST	Plattsburgh	1989	1991	
Metro Airlines	Texas					Clear Lake City STOLport	1969	1993	Originally Houston Metro Airlines
Metroflight Airlines	Texas					Clear Lake City STOLport		1993	Part of Metro Airlines
Metro Express II				MEX	EAGLE EXPRESS		1984	1995	Established as Eastern Metro Express. Operated Jetstream 31
Metro Express Airlines	Georgia			EME	EASTERN METRO	Atlanta	1984	1991	
Metro International Airways	New York		FT			New York Kennedy	1981	1983	Passenger division of Flying Tiger Line. Operated Boeing 747
MetroJet	Virginia		US	USA	USAIR	Baltimore–Washington	1998	2001	
Metropolitan Air Ferry Service	New York					Newark	1931	1931	Operated Ford Trimotor
MGM Grand Air	California		MG	MGM	GRAND AIR	Minneapolis–Saint Paul	1987	1995	To Champion Air
Miami Air Charter	Florida			HUR	HURRICANE CHARTER	Miami	1987	1995	RenamedNations Air Express
Miami Air International	Florida		LL	BSK	BISCAYNE	Miami	1990	2020	
Miami Air Lease	Florida		MG	MGD	MIAMI AIR	Miami	1999	1999	
Miami Airlines	Florida					Miami	1960	1961	
Miami Executive Aviation	Florida					Miami	1997	1999	
Miami Seaplane Service	Florida					Miami Seaplane Base	1933	1933	
Miami Valley Aviation	Ohio			OWL	NIGHT OWL	Middletown	1998	2006	Established as Hoganair
Miami-Key West Airways	Florida					Miami	1937	1938	
Michigan Air Express	Michigan						1930	1931	
Michigan Airways	Michigan						1982	1989	Established as Emmet County Aviation. Acquired by Drummond Island Air
Michigan Central Airlines	Michigan					Bishop	1938	1938	
Michigan Peninsular Airways	Michigan					Willow Run	1978	1981	Operated DC-8
Michigan Trade Winds	Michigan						1968	1968	
Mid Pacific Air	Hawaii		HO	MPA	MID PAC	Honolulu	1981	1995	
Mid Pacific Cargo	Indiana		PF	MPA		Lafayette	1999	1999	
Mid South Airways							1940	1940	
Mid-America Airlines	Illinois					Peoria	1970	1970	Operated Martin 2-0-2
Mid-American Air Transport	Kansas						1967	1971	Operated Beech 18
Mid-Atlantic Freight	North Carolina			MDC	NIGHT SHIP	Piedmont Triad	1990	2005	Acquired by Martinaire in 2005
Mid-Coast Airways	Maine					Rockland	1960	1968	Renamed Downeast Airlines
Mid-Continent Air Express	Colorado					Denver Stapleton	1929	1931	Operated Fokker Super Universal. Acquired by Western Air Express
Mid-Continent Airlines	Iowa					Sioux Gateway	1938	1952	Established as Hanfords Tri-State Airlines in 1928. Acquired by Braniff
Mid-Continent Airlines							1964	1964	
Mid-Continent Airlines	Tennessee					Memphis	1969	1970	Operated Cessna 402
Mid-Continent Airlines	Oklahoma					Halliburton Field	1972	1974	Operated Piper Aircraft
Mid-Continent Airlines							1980	1982	Funded by Terry Hudik and Mike Gedmin. Renamed American Central Airlines
Mid-Hudson Airline							1951	1966	Renamed Command Airways
Mid-South Airlines							1979	1983	Established as Resort Commuter Airlines. Renamed Air Virginia
Mid-West Airways	Iowa					Des Moines	1929	1931	Renamed Des Moines Airways
Mid-West Airlines	Iowa					Des Moines	1949	1952	Local service airline, briefly owned by Purdue University. Completely unrelated to the later Midwest Airlines of Wisconsin.
MidAtlantic Airways	Pennsylvania		BK	PDC		Pittsburgh	2002	2006	
Midcontinent Airlines	Nebraska		CT	MCA	CONTINAIR	Omaha	1986	1989	Began as AAA Airlines. Operated as Braniff Express
Midet Aviation	Florida					Palm Beach	1938	1956	Acquired by Mackey Airlines
Midnight Express	Georgia					Atlanta	1983	1988	
Midstate Airlines	Wisconsin		IU	MIS	MIDSTATE	Central Wisconsin	1964	1989	To Sentry Insurance
Midway Airlines (1976–1991)	Illinois		ML	MDW	MIDWAY	Chicago Midway	1976	1991	
Midway Connection	Illinois			XAP	MID-TOWN	Chicago Midway	1987	1991	
Midway Metrolink	Illinois					Chicago Midway	1983	1985	Operated DC-9-30
Midway Express	Florida			FLA	PALM	Miami	1984	1990	Operated former Air Florida Boeing 737
Midway Airlines (1993–2003)	North Carolina		JI	MDW	MIDWAY	Chicago Midway	1993	2003	
Midway Aviation	Texas					Dallas Love Field	1996	1996	Acquired by Airnet Express
Midwest Air Charter	Ohio			AOH	AIR OHIO	Wilmington, Ohio	1970	1980	Acquired by Airborne Freight Corporation, became Airborne Express, today's ABX Air
Midwest Airlines	Wisconsin		YX	MEP	MIDEX	Milwaukee Mitchell	2002	2010	Merged with Frontier Airlines, completely unrelated to earlier Mid-West Airlines.
Midwest Connect	Wisconsin		YX	MEP	MIDEX	Milwaukee Mitchell	1994	2010	Regional airline associate of Midwest Airlines
Midwest Express	Wisconsin		YX	MEP	MIDEX	Milwaukee Mitchell	1978	2002	Originally K-C Aviation, renamed Midwest Airlines
Midwest Airways	Ohio					Lunken Field			
Midwest Aviation	Minnesota					New Ulm	1973	1983	Operated as Air New Ulm (1973–1977), then as Lake State Airways (1977–1999)
Midwest Commuter Airlines	Indiana					Indianapolis	1967	1974	
Militair							1979	1980	Operated American Eagle Boeing 707 to fly military families
Million Air Monterey	California					Salinas	1999	2012	Established as Air Trails. Operated Cessna Citation II, Learjet 35A
Millon Air	Florida		OX	OXO	MILL AIR	Miami	1983	1998	Operated Boeing 707, CL-44
Mission Airlines	California					Gillespie Field	1969	1982	Operated Beech 18
Mississippi Valley Airlines	Wisconsin		XV	MVA	VALAIR	Quad City	1968	1985	Merged with Air Wisconsin
Missouri Air Commuter	Missouri					Kansas City	1974	1978	Charter and air taxi. Operated Martin 4-0-4
Modern Air Transport	New Jersey		KV		MODERN	Newark Liberty	1946	1975	
Mohawk Airlines	New York		MO		MOHAWK	Utica, New York	1945	1972	As Robinson Airlines, to Allegheny Airlines
Mokulele Flight Service	Hawaii					Kona	1998	2005	Rebranded as Mokulele Airlines
Monarch Air	Texas					Dallas Addison	1986	2017	Founded by the Sawtelle family. Operated Cessna Skyhawk
Monarch Air Lines	Colorado					Denver	1946	1950	Merged with Arizona Airways and Challenger Airlines to form Frontier Airlines
Monarch Aviation	Florida					Miami	1977	1982	
Monmouth Airlines	New Jersey		VM			Wall Township	1966	1979	Renamed Ocean Airways
Montauk Caribbean Airways	New York		YL	ORA		Farmingdale	1960	1987	Sold and renamed Long Island Airlines
Morris Air	Utah		KN	MSS	WASATCH	Salt Lake City	1984	1994	As Morris Air Service, to Southwest Airlines
Mountain Air Express	Colorado		M7	MAX	PIKES PEAK	Denver	1996	1998	Sold to Air Wisconsin, formerly owned by Western Pacific Airlines
Mountain Airways	New York					Kingston–Ulster	1969	1970	Operated BN Islander
Mountain Aviation	Alaska					Sitka	1977	1995	Operated amphibious Cessna 185, DHC Beaver
Mountain West Airlines	Idaho		FX			Boise	1979	1981	
Mountain West Airlines	Arizona					Phoenix Sky Harbor	1995	1996	To Mesa Airlines
Mountainwest Aviation	Arizona					Tucson	1967	1981	Acquired Sierra Pacific Airlines, Operated Convair 580
MPA Michigan Peninsula Airlines	Michigan		MN	XAT		Willow Run	1979	1984	Cargo operator
Munz Northern Airlines	Alaska					Nome	1974	1983	
Mt. McKinley Air Freight	Alaska					Anchorage	1946	1949	Operated C-47A
Murray Air	Michigan		5M	MUA		Oakland County	1986	2008	Rebranded as National Airlines (N8)
Muse Air	Texas		MC	TST	MUSE AIR	Dallas Love Field	1981	1986	Acquired by Southwest Airlines and renamed TranStar Airlines
Mustang Airlines	Texas					Dallas	1967	1977	
Mutual Air Lines	California					Los Angeles	1928	1929	Operated Ryan Brougham
Myrtle Beach Jet Express	South Carolina					Myrtle Beach	1996	1999	
N
Nantucket Airlines	Massachusetts			ACK	ACK AIR	Hyannis	1986	1989	Merged with Cape Air
Nantucket Shuttle	Massachusetts					Hyannis	2006	2011	Founded as Horizon Air Charter. Acquired by Island Airlines
Napier Air Service	Alabama			NAP	NAPIER	Dothan	1948	1991	
Naples Airlines	Florida					Naples	1960	1980	Merged into Provincetown-Boston Airlines
Nashville Eagle	Tennessee					Nashville	1987	1991	Acquired AVAir. Merged with Command Airways to become Flagship Airlines
National Air Transport	Illinois					Chicago Midway	1925	1934	
National Airlines (1934–1980)	Florida		NA	NA	NATIONAL	Miami	1934	1980	Merged into Pan American World Airways
National Airlines (1983–1985)			OV	NAN	NATION AIR		1983	1985	dba for United Air Carriers, which flew 1982–1983 as "Overseas National Airways"
National Airlines (1999–2002)	Nevada		N7	ROK	RED ROCK	Las Vegas McCarran	1999	2002	
National Airlines / Private Jet Expeditions	Kansas		5J	PJE	Pee Jay	Atlanta	1994	1995	
National Airways	Massachusetts					Boston	1931	1940	Founded by Paul Collins, Sam Solomon, Amelia Earhart. Operated 2 Stinson Airliner. To Delta Air Lines
National Commuter Airlines	Florida					Miami	1982	1984	Acquired by Air Florida
National Executive Flight Service	Massachusetts					Boston	1960	1967	Renamed Executive Airlines
National Florida Airlines	Florida			NFA	VOYAGER	Daytona Beach	1981	1983	
National Freight Service	California					Los Angeles	1945	1949	RenamedFlying Tigers Airlines. Operated Budd Conestoga, C-46
National Parks Airways	Idaho					Salt Lake City	1927	1937	Bought by Western Airlines
National Skyway Freight Corporation	California					Los Angeles	1945	1946	Operated Budd Conestoga. Renamed Flying Tiger Line
Nations Air	Pennsylvania		N5	NAE	NATIONS EXPRESS	Pittsburgh	1995	1998	
Nationwide Air Transport Service	Florida					Miami	1946	1951	Cargo carrier
Nationwide Airlines	Michigan					Detroit	1947	1952	Air mail and passenger service
Nationwide Airlines Southeast	Georgia					Atlanta	1969	1978	Name changed to Air South (Georgia)
Navajo Airlines	Arizona					Winslow	1930	n/a	Operated Kreutzer Air Coach
Near East Air Transport	Rome					Tel Aviv; Nicosia; Asmara	1949	1951	Spin-off of Alaska Airlines and front for El Al
Nenana Fuel Company	Alaska					Fairbanks	1958	1992	Cargo carrier. Operated C-46, DC-3
Nevada Airlines	California					Los Angeles Grand Central	1929	1929	Operated four Lockheed Vega
Nevada Airlines	Nevada						1963	1962	Established as Blatz Airlines. Succeeded by Hawthorne-Nevada Airlines in 1964
New England Air Express	New Jersey					Teterboro	1949	1952	Irregular air carrier shut by CAB in 1952 for mistreating passengers
New England Air Transport	Maine						2008	2009	
New England Central Airways	Massachusetts					Boston	1946	1947	Operated Cessna Bobcat
New England Commuter	New Hampshire					Manchester–Boston	1971	1971	Operated Cessna 402
New England & Western Air Transportation Co.	Massachusetts					Westfield-Barnes	1930	1930	
New Haven Airways	Connecticut				HAVEN AIR	Tweed New Haven	1978	1980	Renamed NewAir
New Jersey Airways							1977	1980	Merged into Merrimack Airlines
New Mexico Airlines	Arizona		LW	NMI	TSUNAMI	Albuquerque	2007	2015	A Pacific Wings subsidiary
New Pacific Airlines	Alaska		7H	RVF	RAVN FLIGHT	Ontario	2021	2025	Subsidiary of former Ravn Alaska
New Orleans Air Lines	Louisiana					New Orleans Lakefront	1931	1931	
New York & Western Airlines	New York					Newark Liberty	1931	n/a	Subsidiary of Pittsburgh Airlines
New York Air	New York		NY	NYA	APPLE	New York-LaGuardia	1980	1987	To Continental Airlines
New York Air Connection	New York		NY	NYA	APPLE	New York-LaGuardia	1985	1987	Routes feeding New York Air
New York Airways	New York		NY	NYA	NEW YORK	New York-LaGuardia	1949	1979	Helicopter services
New York Helicopter	New York		HD	NYH		East 34th Street Heliport	1980	1988	
New York Safety Airlines	New York					Roosevelt Field	1929	1930	Established as Tri-Motor Safety Airlines. Acquired by New York, Rio, and Buenos Aires Line
New York-Newport Air Service	New York					Newark Liberty	1922	1923	
New York, Philadelphia & Washington Airways	New York					Newark Liberty	1929	1934	Acquired by Eastern Air Transport
New York, Rio, and Buenos Aires Line	New York					New York Curtiss	1929	1930	To Pan American World Airways
NewAir	Connecticut					Tweed New Haven	1980	1990	Established as New Haven Airways
Niemeyer Aviation	Indiana						1972	1999	Founded by Don Neimeyer. Operated Grumman AA-5 Tiger
Noland-Decoto Flying Service	Washington					Yakima	1966	1998	Charter, aerial photography, ambulance service
Nomads	Michigan					Detroit Metro	1965	2011	Last air travel club standing.
Nome Flying Service	Alaska					Nome	1971	1979	
North American Airlines	California					Lockheed Air Terminal	1952	1956	Name of Twentieth Century Airlines 1952–1956. Part of North American Airlines Group
North American Airlines	Florida					Miami	1980	1982	Established as Air Miami. Operated CASA 212
North American Airlines	Georgia		NA	NAO	NORTH AMERICAN	Tampa	1989	2014	Went bankrupt
North American Airlines Group	California					Lockheed Air Terminal	1949	1957	A combine: rogue virtual airline flying as "North American". "Trans American" 1956–1957
North American Airways	Wisconsin					Appleton	1930s	1930s	Operated Stinson Detroiter
North Central Airlines	Wisconsin		NC		NORTH CENTRAL	Chicago O'Hare	1944	1979	Merged with Southern Airways to form Republic Airlines (1979-1986)
North Continent Airlines	California					Long Beach	1983	1991	Operated Hamilton Westwind III, Beech 1900, Twin Otter
North Pacific Airlines	Alaska					Anchorage	1983	1992	Founded by Roy Musgrove
North Pacific Airlines	Washington					Seattle–Tacoma	1987	1991	Merged with WestAir Commuter Airlines
North Slope Supply Company	Alaska					Anchorage	1969	1969	Went bankrupt
North South Airways	Georgia		SPK		SPK	Statesboro	1983	2003	Founded as Diamond Aviation
North Star Air Cargo	Alaska			SBX	SKY BOX	Anchorage	1989	2008	
North Star Group	New York					New York-LaGuardia			1950s combine. Aircraft shown is Caribbean American Lines
Northcoast Executive Airlines	Ohio		5N	NCE	TOP HAT	Dayton	1990	1991	
Northeast Airlines	Massachusetts		NE	DOW	NORTHEAST	Boston	1940	1972	Founded 1931 as Boston-Maine Airways, merged into Delta Air Lines
Northeast Airlines	Maine			NEE	NORTHEAST	Portland Jetport	1997	1999	Began as Downeast Express
Northeast Express Regional Airlines	New Hampshire		2V	NEE		Manchester–Boston	1974	1994	Went bankrupt
Northeastern International Airways	Florida		QS	QSA	NORTHEASTER	Fort Lauderdale-Hollywood	1982	1986	
Northern Air Service	Alaska						1930	1930	
Northern Air Transport	Alaska						1924	1926	Renamed Wien Airways of Alaska
Northern Airlines	North Dakota					Minot	1928	1929	
Northern Airlines	Ohio					St. Marys	1968	1970	Operated Beech 18, Twin Otter
Northern Airlines	Minnesota					St. Paul Downtown	1981	1982	Filed for bankruptcy
Northern Consolidated Airlines	Alaska					Anchorage	1947	1968	Merged with Wien Airways Alaska Operated DC-3, Short Skyvan
Northern Illinois Commuter Airlines	Illinois			NIC	ILLINOIS COMMUTER		1979	1980	Operated Beech 99
Northern International Airlines	New York					New York Kennedy	1954	1966	Renamed Direct Airlines
North Star Maritime	California						1977	1977	headquarters in California while to operate out of Iran
Northern Star Airlines	Illinois		UO	XAP	MID TOWN	Chicago Gary	1994	1995	Reorganized as Northern Star Airlines
Northwest Airlines	Minnesota		NW	NWA	NORTHWEST	Minneapolis–Saint Paul	1934	2010	Formed 1926 as Northwest Airways, merged into Delta Air Lines
Northwest Orient Airlines	Minnesota		NW	NWA	NORTHWEST	Minneapolis–Saint Paul	1947	1986	Renamed Northwest Airlines
Northwest Airlink	Minnesota			NWX	FLAG SHIP	Minneapolis–Saint Paul	1984	2010	
Northwest Sky Ferry	Washington					Friday Harbor	2007	2014	Established as Rugby Aviation in 1999. Merged into San Juan Airlines
O
Oahu & Kauai Airlines	Hawaii					Honolulu	1976	1976	Operated Cessna 402
Oak Harbor Airlines	Washington					Oak Harbor	1971	1974	Renamed Harbor Airlines
Ocean Air Tradeways	New York						1946	1950	Original name of United States Overseas Airlines
Ocean Airways	Connecticut						1979	1981	Renamed from Monmouth Airlines
Ocean Reef Airways	Florida					Key Largo	1970	1982	Merged into Provincetown-Boston Airlines
Ocean Trade Airways	New York						1946	1950	A 1948 CIA report swapped the Air and Trade in Ocean Air Tradeways. That wrong name is in many books and articles. Added for completeness.
Ocean Wings	Massachusetts			TUK	TUCKERNUCK	Nantucket	1990	2002	To Island Airlines
Oceanair	Puerto Rico			TJ			1970s	1980s	To Trans Commuter Airline
Odyssey Transport	Nevada					Las Vegas McCarran	1998	2002	Cargo operator
Okair (Oaha and Kauai Airlines)	Hawaii		YQ			Honolulu	1975	1980	
Oklahoma Short Line Airways	Oklahoma					Tulsa	1930	1931	Founded by L H Atkinson. Operated Ryan Brougham
Oklahoma-Texas Air Line	Oklahoma					Oklahoma City	1929	1932	
Olson Air Service	Alaska		4B			Nome	1987	2006	
Omaha Aviation Commuter	Nebraska					Omaha	1979	1980	
Omega Air Cargo	Florida					Fort Lauderdale–Hollywood	2004	2004	Renamed Focus Air Cargo
Omni Air Express	Oklahoma				OMNI-EXPRESS	Tulsa	1993	1997	Renamed Omni Air International
Omni Airlines	Arizona		OE			Flagstaff Pulliam	1977	1981	Renamed Arizona Pacific Airlines
Omniflight Helicopters	Texas					Addison	1962	2011	Acquired by Air Methods
ONAT (Orvis Nelson Air Transport Company)	California		OE			Oakland	1946	1946	RenamedTransocean Air Lines
Oneida County Aviation	New York					Oneida County	1975	1976	Renamed Empire Airlines
OneJet	Pennsylvania		J1			Pittsburgh	2015	2018	Established as PrimAir
ONG Airlines	Illinois					Chicago Meigs Field	2015	2018	Founded by William Armitage Ong. Established as PrimAir
Orange Air	Florida		U3	ORN	ORANGE JET	Orlando Sanford	2011	2017	Charter operator
Orion Air	North Carolina		HS	TAG	TAGGE	Louisville	1981	1989	Originally Zantop Airways. Assets sold to Ryan International
Orion Airways	Missouri					St. Louis Lambert	1971	1971	Third-level services
Orlando Airlines	Florida					Orlando	1943	1947	Renamed Florida Airways
Oscar Winchell Air Service	Alaska					Anchorage	1931	1932	Founded by Oscar Winchell
Otis Spunkmeyer Air	California					Oakland	1990	1999	Established as Sentimental Journeys Aviation. Operated DC-3
Otter Air	Washington					Seattle Lake Union Seaplane Base	1985	1986	Scheduled and charter seaplane services. Acquired by Kenmore Air
Overland Airways	Oklahoma					Alameda	1929	1932	
Overseas International Distributors	California					Van Nuys	1978	1979	Renamed Ginny Aviation. Operated Boeing 720
Overseas National Airways	New York		OV	OV	Liberty	New York Kennedy	1946	1978	The original version.
Overseas National Airways (second version)	New York		OV	ONA	ONAIR	New York Kennedy	1982	1983	dba for United Air Carriers, operated as "National Airlines" 1983–1985
Owensboro Aviation	Kentucky					Owensboro–Daviess	1964	1974	Founded by L.S. Cox. RenamedAir Kentucky
Oxnard Sky Freight	California					Oxnard	1946	1951	Founded 24 November 1946 as partnership in Ventura County by Voyle Banks, Ralph Hicks & Melvin Hicks
Ozark Air Lines	Missouri		OZ	OZA	OZARK	St Louis Lambert International Airport	1950	1986	To Trans World Airlines
Ozark Air Lines (1998)	Missouri			OZR		Oklahoma Will Rogers	1998	2001	To Great Plains Airlines
P
P & M Flying Services	Maine			PAZ	PAPA MIKE	Presque Isle	1965	1968	Founded by John C. Philbrick. Renamed Aroostook Airways
P & N Flight and Charter	Indiana					Marion	1995	1996	Passenger and cargo charters
PAC Air	Massachusetts			PCR	PACAIR	Provincetown	1989	1989	Owned by Arthur Pearson. Sold to San Juan Airlines
Pace Airlines	North Carolina		Y5	PCE	PACE	Winston-Salem Smith Reynolds	1996	2002	To Hooters Air
Pacific Air Charter	California			PRC	PACIFIC CHARTER	San Diego	1994	1996	Acquired by Airnet Express
Pacific Air Express	Hawaii			PCF	PACIFIC EXPRESS	Honolulu	1983	1986	
Pacific Air Lines	California		PC	PC	PACIFIC	San Francisco	1946	1968	Renamed 1958 from Southwest Airways, merged w/ Bonanza and West Coast to form Air West later renamed Hughes Airwest
Pacific Air Transport	California						1926	1928	Merged into Boeing Air Transport, but remained a separate division
Pacific Airways	Alaska		3F			Ketchikan	2000	2020	Operated DHC Beaver floatplane
Pacific Alaska Airlines	Alaska		AW	PAK	PACIFIC ALASKA	Fairbanks	1972	1986	Operated de Havilland Heron, DC-3, DC-6, Fairchild Packet, B-25 Mitchell
Pacific Alaska Airways	Alaska					Juneau	1932	1941	Merged into Pan American World Airways
Pacific American Airlines	California					Burbank Hollywood	1975	1978	uncertificated carrier follow on from Mercer Airlines
Pacific Cal Air	California		AX	PCC		Oakland	1979	1984	
Pacific Cargo	California					Los Angeles	1985	1985	Operated DC-8-50F
Pacific Coast Airlines					SONIC	Santa Barbara	1981	1985	Established as Apollo Airways. Renamed as Pacific Coast Airlines in 1982.
Pacific Corporation	Delaware						1950	1979	Holding company Used by CIA to control aviation front organizations
Pacific East Airlines	California		6P	PCE		Los Angeles	1983	1984	
Pacific Express	California		VB	WCA		Chico	1982	1984	
Pacific Inter Air	Florida		QT	PIA		Miami	1985	1987	Established as Pacific Interstate. Renamed Bahamas Express
Pacific International Airlines	Arizona			PIN		Tucson	1995	1996	Established as Sportsflight Airways
Pacific Interstate Airlines	Nevada					Las Vegas McCarran	1984	1985	Renamed Pacific Inter Air
Pacific Island Aviation	Northern Mariana Islands		9J	PSA	PACIFIC ISLE	Saipan	1988	2005	
Pacific Marine Airways	California					Avalon	1922	1928	Operated two Curtiss HS
Pacific National Airways	California					Burbank	1980	1981	Established as Air Tours
Pacific Northern Airlines	Alaska		PN			Seattle	1945	1967	Established as Woodley Airways by Art Woodley in 1932. Renamed Pacific Northern Airlines. Moved HQ to Seattle in 1951, but remained an Alaska-centric airline. Merged into Western Airlines.
Pacific Northern Airlines (Oregon)	Oregon						1973		Oregon airline from the 1970s unconnected to the original Alaska carrier that merged into Western in 1967
Pacific Ocean Airlines	Hawaii					Honolulu	1946	1948	
Pacific Overseas Airlines	California					Ontario	1946	1948	Established as Industrial Air Transport by former Consairway employees, flew for Air Transport Command and had own flights to China
Pacific Seaboard Air Lines	California					Monterey	1933	1935	Renamed Chicago and Southern Air Lines. Operated Bellanca CH-300
Pacific Skyway	California						2000	2003	
Pacific Southwest Airlines	California		PS	PSX	SMILEY	Los Angeles	1949	1988	To US Airways
Pacific Western Airways	Utah					Salt Lake City	1968	1969	
Pacific Wings	Arizona		LW	NMI	TSUNAMI	Albuquerque Sunport	1974	2015	See also New Mexico Airlines, Georgia Skies, TennesseeSkies, and KentuckySkies
Paklook Air	Alaska					Fairbanks	2003	2003	Founded by Howard Holman and Terry Cratty. Renamed Servant Air. Operated Cessna 207
Palm Springs Airlines	California					Palm Springs	1936	1937	
Pan Alaska Airways	Alaska					Fairbanks	1970	1973	Renamed Pacific Alaska Airlines. Acquired by Empire Airlines in 1989
Pan Am Air Bridge	Florida					Miami Seaplane Base	1996	1999	
Pan American World Airways	New York		PA	PAA	CLIPPER	New York Kennedy	1927	1991	Went bankrupt
Pan Am Cargo	New York		PA	PAA	CLIPPER	New York Kennedy	1963	1983	Subsidiary of Pan American World Airways
Pan Am Express	New York		RZ	PXX	PAN AM	Miami	1981	1991	A flight connection code sharing service operated by several air carriers. See also Ransome Airlines
Pan Am Shuttle	New York						1986	1991	To Delta Shuttle
Pan American Airways (1996–1998)	Florida		PN	PAA	CLIPPER	Miami	1996	1998	Merged with Carnival Air Lines
Pan American Airways (1998–2004)	New Hampshire		PA	PAA	CLIPPER	Portsmouth	1998	2004	To Boston-Maine Airways
Pan American-Grace Airways	Florida		PG	PG			1929	1969	To Braniff International Airways
Panagra Airways	Florida		7E	PGI	PANAGRA	Fort Lauderdale-Hollywood	1996	1999	
Panama Airways	Florida					Panama City–Bay County	1990	1991	
Panhandle Airways	Florida						1976	1978	Operated Beech 18, DC-3
Paradise Airlines	California					Oakland	1962	1964	intrastate airline that operated L-049. One of its two founders later founded Holiday Airlines
Paradise Airways	Virginia		OI	PAI	SEA RAY	Manassas	1995	1995	Renamed Prestige Airways. Charter and limited scheduled service
Paradise Island Airlines	Florida		BK	PDI	PARADISE ISLAND	Miami	1989	1999	
Paragon Air	Hawaii					Honolulu	1985	2006	Charter operator
Paramount Airlines	California					Burbank	1961	1962	Supplemental air carrier. Originally Paul Mantz Air Services. CAB refused to certificate it in 1962 due to combine activity.
Parks Air Lines	Illinois					Parks Metropolitan Airport	1950	1950	Founded as Parks Air Transport in 1944. Acquired by Ozark Air Lines
Passaat Airlines	Florida					Miami	1965	1967	Charter operator
Patriot Air	Texas					Dallas Love Field	2001	2002	
Patriot Airlines	California		P7	PAA	PATRIOTAIR	San Jose	1991	1994	
Paul Mantz Air Services	California					Burbank	1947	1961	Renamed Paramount Airlines
Peak Air	Colorado					Aspen	1995	1995	Renamed Aspen Mountain Air
Pearson Aircraft	Washington		YE			Port Angeles	1972	1981	Founded by Earl Pearson. Acquired by San Juan Airlines
Pearson-Alaska Airlines	Alaska					Anchorage	1948	1956	Founded by Eric Pearson. Renamed World Wide Airlines. Operated DC-4, C-46, L-749, L-1049
Peck & Rice Airways	Alaska					Bethel	1930	1939	Founded by John Peck and Wyman Rice. Operated Travel Air 6000B
Pegaso Air	California					Los Angeles	1985	1986	
Pegasus Air	Washington					Bremerton	1985	1986	Operated Cessna 172
Peninsula Airways	California					San Carlos	1973	1973	
Peninsular Air Transport	Florida					Miami	1946	1957	Irregular air carrier shut by CAB in 1957 for combine activities
Pennsylvania Air Lines	Pennsylvania					Bettis Field	1930	1936	Merged with Central Airlines to form Pennsylvania Central Airlines
Pennsylvania Airlines	Pennsylvania					Harrisburg	1980	1985	Acquired by USAir
Pennsylvania Central Airlines	Pennsylvania					Allegheny County	1936	1948	Formed by the merger of Central Airlines and Pennsylvania Airlines. Operated DC-3A. To Capital Airlines
Pennsylvania Commuter Airlines	Pennsylvania		AL			Harrisburg	1970	1980	Established as Harrisburg Commuter. Became an Allegheny Commuter and renamed Pennsylvania Airlines.
Penobscot Airways	Maine					Millinocket Seaplane Base	1949	1955	Founded by Arthur Harjula. Renamed Stonington Flying Service
People Express Airlines (1980s)	New Jersey		PE	PEX	PEOPLE EXPRESS	Newark Liberty	1981	1987	Merged into Continental Airlines
People Express Airlines (2010s)	Virginia		V2	RBY	RUBY	Newport News/Williamsburg	2014	2014	
Permian Airways	Texas					Midland	1979	1982	Founded by John Andrews and David Glover
Pet Airways	Florida			SUB	SUB AIR		2009	2013	
PHH Air	Kansas					Wichita	1988	1989	Former Ryan Aviation, briefly named PHH Air after parent PHH Group, then renamed Ryan International
Philadelphia Rapid Transit	Pennsylvania					Philadelphia	1926	1926	Operated Fokker F.VII
Phoenix Air	Georgia					Cartersville	2002	2003	
Phoenix Airways	Georgia					DeKalb–Peachtree	1980	1981	
Pickwick Airways	California					Los Angeles	1929	1930	Operated Bach Air Yacht
Piedmont Airlines (1948–1989)	North Carolina		PI	PAI	PIEDMONT	Charlotte Douglas	1948	1989	To US Airways
Pilgrim Airlines	Connecticut		PM	PMT	PILGRIM	Groton-New London	1960	1986	Acquired by Business Express Airlines
Pine State Airlines	Maine		PW	PXX		Frenchville	1990	1999	Operated Cessna 402C
Pinehurst Airlines	Georgia		MQ			Whispering Pines	1973	1982	Operated YS-11, C-47A. Went into bankruptcy due to PATCO
Pinnacle Airlines	Michigan		9E	FLG	FLAGSHIP	Detroit Metro	2002	2013	Establishes as Express Airlines I. RenamedEndeavor Air
Pioneer Air Lines	Texas					Houston-Hobby	1946	1955	Merged into Continental Airlines
Pioneer Airlines	Colorado		JB	PIO	PIONEER	Denver	1976	1986	Establishes as Pioneer Airways. Operated Beech 99
Pioneer Airways	South Dakota						1927	1928	Founded by Oscar Winclell. Renamed Rapid City Airlines. Operated Curtiss Jenny
Pioneer Airways	Alaska					Ketchikan	1931	1931	Founded by Vern C. Gorst, Roy F. Jones, C.R. Wright Jones. Renamed Ketchikan Airways. Operated Curtiss Jenny
Pitcairn Aviation	New York					Floyd Bennett Field	1927	1930	Founded by Harold J. Pitcairn. Renamed Eastern Air Transport
Pittsburgh Airways	Pennsylvania					Allegheny County	1929	1930	Founded by James Condon, Ted Taney. Subsidiary of New York & Western Airlines
Planet Airways	Florida			PLZ	PLANET	Orlando	1995	2006	Began as Airship Airways
Platinum Airlines	Florida		P2	PLS		Miami	1998	2006	
Pocono Airlines	Pennsylvania		4P	POC	POCONO	Wilkes-Barre/Scranton	1965	1990	Began flying as an Allegheny Commuter, switched to TWA Express in 1989.
Polar Airways	Alaska		PE			Anchorage	1968	1979	Operated Aero Commander
Pollack Flying Service	Alaska					Fairbanks	1933	1942	Founded by Frank Pollack. Sold to Alaska Star Airlines
Pompano Airways	Florida		MG			Fort Lauderdale Executive	1983	1984	Subcontract carrier for Air Florida Commuter
Pomona Valley Aviation	California					Brackett Field	1968	1975	Renamed Inland Empire Airlines. Operated Piper Navajo, Swearingen Metroliner
Port Angeles Air Transport	Washington					Port Angeles	1931	1931	Operated Stinson Detroiter
Ports of Call Air	Colorado		PC	SPC	PORT	Denver	1988	1989	Final identity of Ports of Call Travel Club/Skyworld
Ports of Call Travel Club	Colorado					Denver	1966	1986	Air travel club turned airline, popularly known today as "Denver Ports of Call", not a name it used. From 1986, Skyworld Airlines
Potomac Air	Texas		BK	PDC	DISTRICT	Washington National	2001	2001	Renamed Midatlantic Airways. Operated DHC-8
Precision Airlines	New Hampshire		RP	PRE	PRECISION	Manchester–Boston	1972	1994	Was an Eastern Express carrier. Acquired by Northeast Express in 1989.
Premier Executive Transport Services	Massachusetts								Alleged to be a front organization for the Central Intelligence Agency
President Airlines	California					Burbank	1960	1962	Supplemental air carrier, bought California Eastern Airways certificate. Operated DC-4, DC-6, DC-7
Presidential Air	California			PRD	PRESIDENTIAL	Long Beach	1993	1996	Operated Airbus A300
Presidential Airways (scheduled)	Virginia		XV		WASHINGTON EAGLE	Washington Dulles	1985	1989	
Presidential Express	Virginia		CJ	CJC	COLGAN	Manassas	1986	1989	Began as Colgan Airways
Prestige Airways	Virginia		OI	PAI	SEA RAY	New York Kennedy	1995	1997	Established as Paradise Airways in 1995.
Pride Air	Louisiana		NI			New Orleans	1985	1985	Went into bankruptcy
PrimAir	Pennsylvania					Pittsburgh	2009	2014	Rebranded OneJet
Primaris Airlines	Nevada		FE	WCP	WHITECAP	Las Vegas McCarran	2002	2009	
Prime Air	Pennsylvania					Clarksville	1986	1987	Operated Piper
Prime Air	Illinois					Murphysboro	1988	1989	
Prinair	Puerto Rico		PQ		COLORBIRD, PRU	Ponce	1966	1985	Established as Aerolíneas de Ponce (Ponce Airlines)
Princeton Air Link	New Jersey		IV	PCN	PRINCETON	Princeton	1986	1988	Operated BN Islander. Went into bankruptcy
Princeton Airways	New Jersey					Princeton	1978	1979	Operated BN Islander, GAF Nomad
Princeton Aviation Corporation	New Jersey					Princeton	1950	1979	Founded by Webster B. Todd and Lawrence Tokash. Participated in the Metro Air Service with A.A. in 1965
Princeville Airways	Hawaii					Honolulu	1980	1987	Renamed Aloha Island Air. Operated Twin Otter
Private Jet Expeditions	Georgia		5J	PJE	PEE JAY	Atlanta	1989	1995	
Pro Air	Florida					Miami	1981	1988	
Pro Air	Washington		P9	PRH	PROHAWK	Detroit Young	1997	2000	
Profit Express Airlines	New York					New York Kennedy	1945	1985	Operated Convair 880
Pronto Aviation Services	Texas					El Paso	1982	1983	Renamed Atorie Air
Provincetown-Boston Airlines	Massachusetts		PT	PBA		Provincetown	1949	1989	
Puertorriqueña de Aviación	Puerto Rico						1936	1941	Also known as Aerovías Nacionales de Puerto Rico
Puget Sound Airlines	Washington					Bellingham	1969	1970	Formed by the merger of six local airlines. To San Juan Airlines. Operated Beech Expeditor, Cherokee Six
Purdue Aeronautics Corporation	Indiana					Lafayette, IN	1949	1950	CAB-certificated scheduled service on Chicago-Lafayette, owned by Purdue University
Purdue Aeronautics Corporation	Indiana			PUR	PURDUE	Lafayette, IN	1953	1968	Charter operator run by Purdue University
Purdue Airlines	Indiana			PUR	PURDUE	Lafayette, IN	1968	1971	Charter operator owned by Stephens Inc. with Purdue University participation

== See also ==
- List of airlines of the United States
- List of airports in the United States
- List of defunct airlines of Guam
- List of defunct airlines of Puerto Rico
- List of defunct airlines of the United States Virgin Islands
