= FKS =

FKS may refer to:

== Sport ==
- FK Sarajevo, a Bosnian football club
- FK Smederevo, a Serbian football club
- Formula Kart Stars, a British karting championship

== Transport ==
- ICAO code: Focus Air Cargo (2004–2008), an American airline
- FAA LID: Frankfort Dow Memorial Field (used informally since at least 1937), an airport in Michigan, United States
- IATA code: Fukushima Airport (opened 1993), in Japan
