= Metrojet =

Metrojet may refer to:

== Airlines ==
- MetroJet (American airline), a defunct American no-frills airline that operated as a division of US Airways
- Metrojet (Russian airline), trading name of Kogalymavia, a Russian airline
- Metrojet Ltd, a provider of business aviation services based in Hong Kong

== Other ==
- "Metro Jets" (song), a 1979 Nick Gilder song
- Metro Jets, an American ice hockey team

== See also ==
- MetJet, a defunct Wisconsin charter airline
- Metro (disambiguation)
- Jet (disambiguation)
