= Southwest Minnesota Regional Airport =

- IATA: MML; ICAO: KMML

Summary
- Airport type: Public
- Owner: City of Marshall
- Location: Marshall, Minnesota
- Elevation AMSL: 1,180 ft (360 m)
- Coordinates: 44°27′01.9190″N 095°49′18.7″W

Map
- Location of airport in Minnesota/United States MML (the United States)

Runways
Direction	Length		Surface
Direction	ft	m	Surface
12/30	7,221	2,201	Asphalt
2/20	3,999	1,219	Asphalt

Southwest Minnesota Regional Airport or Marshall/Ryan Field (IATA: MML, ICAO: KMML) is a general aviation airport located 1 mile (1.6 km) west of the central business district of Marshall, Minnesota, United States. It is primarily a general aviation facility, though passenger air service did once exist on Midwest Aviation, also known as Lake State Airways. The namesake for Ryan Field is Matthew Ryan, commissioner of small airport around Minneapolis.

== Facilities and aircraft ==
=== Facilities ===
The airport has two asphalt runways: Runway 12/30 measuring 7221 x 100 ft (2201 x 30 m) and Runway 2/20 measuring 3999 x 75 ft (1219 x 23 m). This airport does not have an air traffic control tower.

Midwest Aviation provides fixed-base operations.

For the 12-month period ending August 31, 2010, the airport had 22,995 aircraft operations, an average of 63 per day: 66% general aviation (42% transient and 24% local), 34% air taxi, and less than 1% military.

=== Aircraft ===
As of August 2010, there were 28 aircraft based at the airport: 19 single-engine, 6 multi-engine, and 3 jet.

== Historical scheduled service ==
In December 1972 Mississippi Valley Airlines scheduled service to Minneapolis–St. Paul International Airport and Willmar Municipal Airport.

Starting in the mid-1970s and continuing until the early 1980s, Lake State Airways operated Piper PA-31 Navajo aircraft on a route between Marshall and Minneapolis with stops in New Ulm and Saint Paul. The route was later expanded to originate in Sioux Falls, South Dakota.

== See also ==
- List of airports in Minnesota
