= Monarch Airlines (disambiguation) =

Monarch Airlines was a British charter and scheduled airline, operating from 1968 to 2017.

Monarch Airlines may also refer to:

- Monarch Airlines (1946–1950), a Colorado-based American airline
- Monarch Air (1986–2017), a Texas-based American airline; see List of defunct airlines of the United States (J–P)
- Monarch Aviation (1977–1982), a Florida-based American Airline; see List of defunct airlines of the United States (J–P)
