= Airline bankruptcies =

Airline bankruptcies are covered by:

- List of airline bankruptcies in the United States
- Lists of defunct airlines
