= Harbor Air =

Harbor Air may refer to one of the following regional airlines:

- Bar Harbor Airlines, from Maine, US (1971–1991)
- Harbor Airlines, from Washington, US
- Harbour Air, from British Columbia, Canada (founded in 1982)
