= List of airline bankruptcies in the United States =

A number of major airlines have declared bankruptcy and have either ceased operations, or reorganized under bankruptcy protection. Airlines, like any business, are susceptible to market fluctuations and economic difficulties. The economic structure of the airline industry may contribute to airline bankruptcies as well. One major element in almost every airline bankruptcy is the rejection by the debtor of its current collective bargaining agreements with employees. After satisfying certain requirements, bankruptcy law permits courts to approve the rejection of labor contracts by the debtor-employer. With this tool, airline managers reduce costs. Terms of an employee contract negotiated over years can be eliminated in months through Chapter 11. Terms of the Railway Labor Act, amended in 1936 to cover airlines, prevent most labor union work actions before, during and after an airline bankruptcy.

Continental Airlines declared bankruptcy, Chapter 11, a second time in December 1990.

== Timeline ==
This is a timeline of airlines who have filed for bankruptcy protection. Also see list of defunct airlines for a list of airlines which are no longer operating.

=== U.S. airlines bankruptcy filings ===
==== Chapter 7 ====
This is a list of airlines that have filed for bankruptcy protection via Chapter 7 in the United States.

Airline	Date Bankruptcy filed
National Florida Airlines	December 1, 1983
Excellair	July 7, 1984
Oceanaire Lines	February 10, 1984
Connectaire	October 10, 1984
Princeton Air Link	August 11, 1988
Air Kentucky	July 19, 1989
Eastern Air Lines	January 18, 1991
Northcoast Executive	January 29, 1991
Midway Airlines (1976-1991)	November 27, 1991
L’Express	February 2, 1992
Eastwind Airlines	September 30, 1999
Midway Airlines (1993-2003)	October 30, 2003
Southeast Airlines	December 1, 2004
TransMeridian Airlines	September 29, 2005
Big Sky	January 7, 2008
Aloha Airlines	March 31, 2008
Air Midwest	May 14, 2008
Gemini Air Cargo	August 12, 2008
Independence Air	January 6, 2009
Comair	April 4, 2012
Direct Air	April 12, 2012
Evergreen International Airlines	December 31, 2013
Spirit Airlines	May 2, 2026

==== Chapter 11 ====
This is a list of airlines that have filed for bankruptcy protection via Chapter 11 in the United States.

Airline	Date Bankruptcy filed	Date Exited Bankruptcy	Notes
American Trans Air (ATA)	April 2, 2008		Ceased operations
New York Airways	May 18, 1979		Ceased operations
Aeroamerica	November 19, 1979		Ceased operations
Florida Airlines	January 24, 1980		Ceased operations
Indiana Airlines	March 3, 1980		
Air Bahia	December 15, 1980		Ceased operations
Tejas Airlines	December 31, 1980		Ceased operations
Mountain West Airlines-Idaho	March 6, 1981		Ceased operations
LANICA	March 16, 1981		Nicaraguan airline; ceased operations
Coral Air	July 13, 1981		
Pacific Coast Airlines	September 11, 1981		
Swift Aire Lines	September 18, 1981		Ceased operations (Charter flights)
Golden Gate Airlines	October 9, 1981		Ceased operations
Pinehurst Airlines	January 26, 1982		
Silver State Airlines	March 3, 1982		
Air Pennsylvania	March 26, 1982		Ceased operations
Air South	April 2, 1982		
Cochise Airlines	April 16, 1982		Ceased operations
Braniff International	May 13, 1982		Ceased operations
Astec Air East	July 8, 1982		
Will's Air	August 19, 1982		
Aero Sun International	October 15, 1982		
Aero Virgin Islands	October 19, 1982		Ceased operations (in 1990)
Altair Airlines	November 9, 1982		Ceased operations
Continental Airlines	September 23, 1983	June 30, 1986	Emerged after merger with PEOPLExpress, Frontier Airlines, and New York Air. (merged with United Airlines on March 3 2012)
Frontier Airlines	August 28, 1986		Ceased operations
Eastern Airlines	March 9, 1989		Ceased operations
Partnair	October 1, 1989		Norwegian airline; ceased operations
Pan American World Airways	January 8, 1991		Ceased operations; Most assets purchased by Delta Air Lines
America West Airlines	June 28, 1991	August 26, 1994	Merged with US Airways in 2005
Sun Country Airlines	January 2002	2003	Involuntary
National Airlines	December 6, 2000		Ceased operations on November 6, 2002
Trans World Airlines	January 10, 2001, also 1992 and 1995		Filed as part of an acquisition by American Airlines
US Airways	August 11, 2002	March 31, 2003	
United Airlines	December 9, 2002	February 1, 2006	
Air Canada	April 1, 2003	September 30, 2004	Canadian airline
Flash Airlines	March 1, 2004		Ceased operations
US Airways	September 12, 2004	September 27, 2005	Second filing and last before merging with American Airlines on Oct 17 2015. Emerged in conjunction with its acquisition by America West
Avianca	March 21, 2003 May 10, 2020	December 10, 2004 December 1, 2021	Colombian airline
Aloha Airlines	December 30, 2004	February 17, 2006	Cargo division continued flying as Aloha Air Cargo
Northwest Airlines	September 14, 2005	May 31, 2007	Ceased operations; Merged with Delta Air Lines
Delta Air Lines	September 14, 2005	April 30, 2007	Included subsidiary Comair
Maxjet Airways	December 26, 2007		Ceased operations
Aloha Airlines	March 31, 2008		Second filing; ceased passenger operations
ATA Airlines	April 3, 2008		Ceased operations
Skybus Airlines	April 5, 2008		Ceased operations
Frontier Airlines	April 10, 2008	October 1, 2009	
Eos Airlines	August 26, 2008		Ceased operations
Sun Country Airlines	October 6, 2008	February 23, 2011	Second bankruptcy
Primaris Airlines	October 15, 2008		Ceased operations
Mesa Airlines	January 5, 2010	March 11, 2011	
Arrow Air	July 1, 2010		Ceased operations and liquidated
Mexicana	August 28, 2010		Mexican airline; ceased operations
American Airlines	November 29, 2011	December 8, 2013	Emerged from bankruptcy as American Airlines Group; includes parent company AMR Corporation and subsidiary American Eagle Airlines
Ryan International Airlines	March 6, 2012		Ceased operations
Pinnacle Airlines	April 2, 2012	May 1, 2013	Emerged as subsidiary of Delta Air Lines; name changed to Endeavor Air
Southern Air	September 28, 2012		
SeaPort Airlines	February 5, 2016		
Republic Airways Holding	February 25, 2016		
PenAir	August 7, 2017		Ceased operations in Denver and Portland
Dynamic International Airways	July 19, 2017		
Island Air (Hawaii)	October 16, 2017		Ceased operations
Miami Air	March 25, 2020		Ceased operations
Ravn Alaska	April 5, 2020		
LATAM Airlines Group	May 26, 2020	November 3, 2022	Chilean airline holding group; included all subsidiaries
Spirit Airlines	December 15, 2024		Ceased operations and filed for chapter 7 liquidation on May 2, 2026
