= Elko Regional Airport =

Elko Regional Airport J.C. Harris Field
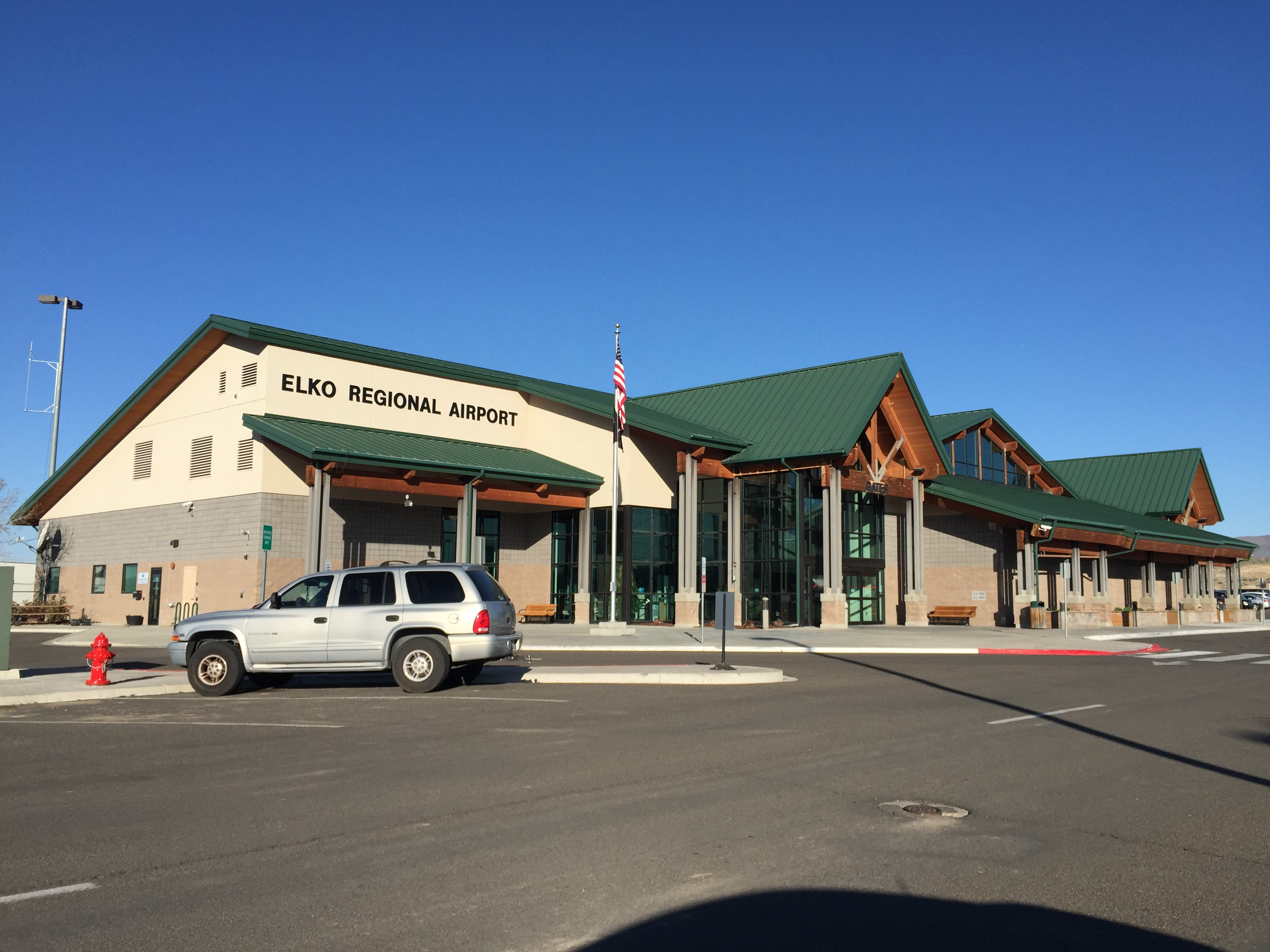
- The passenger terminal at Elko Regional Airport
- IATA: EKO; ICAO: KEKO; FAA LID: EKO

Summary
- Airport type: Public
- Owner: City of Elko
- Serves: Elko, Nevada
- Elevation AMSL: 5,140 ft (1,570 m)
- Coordinates: 40°49′30″N 115°47′30″W
- Website: www.flyelkonevada.com

Maps
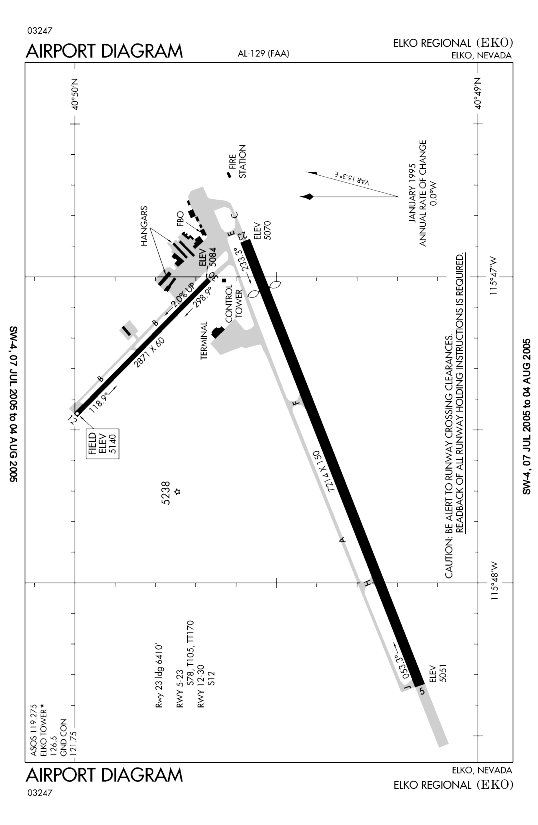
- Airport Diagram

- Location within Nevada Location within the United States

Runways
Direction	Length		Surface
Direction	ft	m	Surface
6/24	7,454	2,272	Asphalt
12/30	3,015	919	Asphalt

Statistics (2022)
- Aircraft operations (year ending 9/30/2022): 13,863
- Based aircraft: 72
- Source: Federal Aviation Administration

Elko Regional Airport (IATA: EKO, ICAO: KEKO, FAA LID: EKO) – formerly Elko Municipal Airport – is a public airport located approximately 1 mile (1.6 km) west of downtown Elko, in Elko County, Nevada, United States.

The airport was named J.C. Harris Field in 1975 in honor of Jess C. Harris, a sheriff from Elko known as "The Flying Sheriff".

== History ==
Originally called Elko Airport, the airfield took on the name Keddie Field by 1935, then Elko Municipal Airport by 1947 and ultimately Elko Regional Airport by the 2000s.

=== Past airline service ===
On April 6, 1926, the airfield became the terminus for the first scheduled air mail run in the United States, flown by Varney Air Lines. The route was Pasco, WA to Boise, ID to Elko, NV. By 1928 the mail route was redirected from Boise to Salt Lake City and Elko had become one of ten stops on a new route from San Francisco to Chicago flown by Boeing Air Transport. Boeing and Varney were predecessors of United Air Lines.

By 1931 Elko was a stop on passenger service between New York City and San Francisco. In a 1931 timetable United Airlines predecessor National Air Transport is shown flying New York City–Cleveland–Toledo–Chicago, connecting to Boeing Air Transport's flight to Iowa City–Des Moines–Omaha–Lincoln–North Platte–Cheyenne–Rock Springs–Salt Lake City–Elko, and on to Reno–Sacramento–Oakland. Scheduled time was 31 hours westbound and 28 hours eastbound. By 1933 Boeing and National Air Transport were flying as United Airlines. By 1953 eastbound flights serving Elko would terminate at Salt Lake City, and in 1955 a stop was added at Ely, Nevada. United served Elko with Boeing 247s, Douglas DC-3s, Convair 340s, and Douglas DC-6Bs. The DC-6Bs flying San Francisco to Salt Lake City via Reno, Elko, and Ely were United's last prop service in the U.S.

In 1970 United replaced the piston-engine powered DC-6Bs with Convair 580 turboprops operated via a contract agreement by Frontier Airlines (1950-1986); the flights used the "UA" airline code. In November 1977 United Boeing 737-200s took over, flying San Francisco - Reno - Elko - Ely - Salt Lake City - Denver, one round trip each day. United ended this flight on April 1, 1982.

Several small commuter airlines served Elko. In the mid-1970s Scenic Airlines flew to Ely and Las Vegas and Sun Valley Key Commuter flew to Salt lake City and Reno. Air Chaparral flew from Elko to Salt Lake City, Reno, and several smaller towns in northern Nevada in the early 1980s. Scenic Airlines returned from 1999 through 2006 with flights from Elko to Las Vegas via the North Las Vegas Airport.

Royal West Airlines flew BAe 146-200 jets nonstop to Las Vegas for a short time in 1987.

Casino Express Airlines was established in 1987 and based in Elko. The carrier supported the Red Lion Hotel and Casino, flying scheduled charter Boeing 737-200s from Elko to many cities throughout the U.S. starting in 1989. In 1994 and 1995 Casino Express scheduled weekend only flights nonstop between Elko and Boise, Milwaukee, Portland, OR and Seattle with 737s and McDonnell Douglas MD-80s. Casino Express changed its name to Xtra Airways in 2005 and ended jet service to Elko by 2010 moving its headquarters to Boise, Idaho.

SkyWest Airlines began serving Elko in 1982 as an independent commuter carrier to replace United Airlines. The carrier flew Swearingen Metros to Reno, Salt Lake City and Ely. In 1986 SkyWest began operating as Western Express for Western Airlines via code sharing agreement with flights to Reno and Salt Lake City using Metroliners. After the merger of Western into Delta Air Lines in 1987, SkyWest became a Delta Connection carrier and in 1988 began flying Embraer EMB-120 Brasilias on its flights to Reno and Salt Lake City. The flights to Reno ended in 2005. In 2015 SkyWest replaced the Brasilia with 50-seat Bombardier CRJ100/200s, but the frequency was reduced to two flights per day. SkyWest remains at Elko as a Delta Connection carrier and is the only airline there.

== Facilities ==
Elko Regional Airport covers 700 acres (280 ha) and has two asphalt runways: 6/24 is 7,454 x 150 ft (2,272 x 46 m) and 12/30 is 3,015 x 60 ft (919 x 18 m).

In the year ending September 30, 2022, the airport had 13,863 aircraft operations, averaging 38 per day: 75% general aviation, 20% airline, and 5% air taxi. 72 aircraft were then based at this airport: 62 single-engine, 5 multi-engine, 4 helicopter, and 1 ultra-light.

== Airline and destination ==
Airlines	Destinations
Delta Connection	Salt Lake City

=== Top destinations ===
Busiest domestic routes from EKO (January 2025 - December 2025)
Rank	City	Passengers	Carriers
1	Salt Lake City, Utah	16,000	Delta

== Accidents and incidents ==
- On September 5, 1946, a Trans-Luxury Airlines Douglas DC-3 upon losing visual contact in ground fog and limited visibility crashed into a hillside 2.5 miles W of Elko Airport. 20 out of the 21 passengers and crew were killed.

== See also ==
- List of airports in Nevada
