= Platinum Airlines =

Airline of the United States

IATA	ICAO	Call sign
P2	PLS	-
- Commenced operations: 1998; 28 years ago
- Ceased operations: 2010; 16 years ago
- Operating bases: Miami International Airport; São Paulo-Guarulhos International Airport
- Subsidiaries: Platinum Air Linhas Aéreas
- Fleet size: 2 Boeing 727
- Headquarters: Miami, Florida, United States

Platinum Airlines was an airline based in Miami, Florida, USA. It operates ACMI (aircraft, crew, maintenance and insurance) services for charter airlines, as well as services for the United States Department of Defense. Its main bases are Miami International Airport and São Paulo-Guarulhos International Airport.

== History ==
The airline commenced operations in 1998. In November 2005 it received United States Department of Transportation authority to launch interstate and foreign charter services under ACMI contracts. In September 2006 the airline transferred its Boeing 727-200 to the Brazilian register for use by an also defunct subsidiary, Platinum Linhas Aéreas, based in Rio de Janeiro. Platinum Airlines itself plans to resume services with two new Boeing 727-200 aircraft. It has 250 employees (as of March 2007).

== See also ==
- List of defunct airlines of the United States
