= JetTrain (airline) =

Airline of the United States

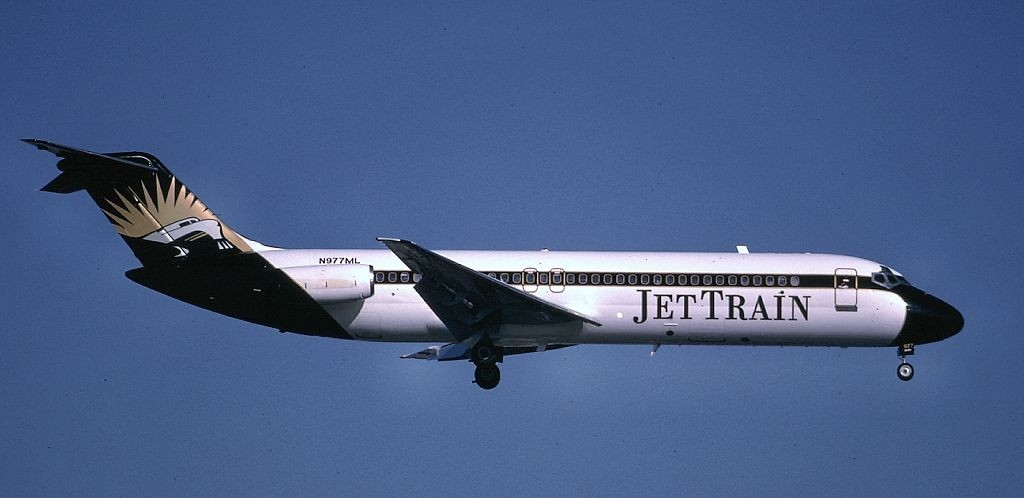
- JetTrain DC-9-31 approaching Newark Airport in April 1996.
IATA	ICAO	Call sign
LF	JTN	JETTRAIN
- Founded: 1994; 32 years ago (as AirTrain); October 1, 1995; 30 years ago (as JetTrain)
- Ceased operations: November 12, 1996; 29 years ago
- Hubs: Pittsburgh International Airport
- Fleet size: 3
- Destinations: 6
- Headquarters: Aliquippa, Pennsylvania
- Employees: 160 (Nov 1996)

JetTrain Corporation was an American low-fare airline that operated for less than a year throughout the 1990s. The airline was initially called AirTrain and was later renamed in October 1995.

== History ==
JetTrain began operating in January 1996, with a fleet of DC-9 aircraft on flights connecting Pittsburgh, Newark, and Orlando, eventually expanded to include routes between Boston, Philadelphia, and Nashville.

JetTrain encountered multiple challenges, such as insufficient demand, which made it difficult to attract enough passengers, and rising operating costs due to increased jet fuel prices in the 1990s. This made operating the DC-9s costly, and competition from US Airways, whose hubs in Pittsburgh and Philadelphia limited JetTrain's expansion opportunities.

== Destinations ==
JetTrain served the following destinations throughout its existence:

- Boston - Logan International Airport
- Nashville - Nashville International Airport
- Newark - Newark Liberty International Airport
- Orlando - Orlando International Airport
- Philadelphia - Philadelphia International Airport
- Pittsburgh - Pittsburgh International Airport (Hub)

== See also ==
- List of defunct airlines of the United States
