= DeLaurentis Airport =

DeLaurentis International Airport at Oak Harbor
- IATA: ODW; ICAO: KOKH; FAA LID: OKH

Summary
- Airport type: Public
- Owner: DFF, LLC
- Serves: Oak Harbor, Washington
- Elevation AMSL: 193 ft (59 m)
- Coordinates: 48°15′06″N 122°40′25″W
- Website: Delaurentisairport.com/
- Interactive map of DeLaurentis International Airport at Oak Harbor

Runways
Direction	Length		Surface
Direction	ft	m	Surface
7/25	3,265	995	Asphalt

Statistics (2009)
- Aircraft operations: 16,224
- Based aircraft: 24
- Source: Federal Aviation Administration

DeLaurentis Airport at Oak Harbor (IATA: ODW, ICAO: KOKH, FAA LID: OKH, formerly 76S) is a public use airport located three nautical miles (6 km) southwest of the central business district of Oak Harbor, a city in Island County, Washington, United States. It is privately owned by DFF, LLC. It was formerly known as A.J. Eisenberg Airport owned by A.J. Eisenberg Airport LLC. and Wes Lupien Airport owned by Air International LLC. The airport previously had scheduled passenger service provided by Kenmore Air, which ceased operations to Oak Harbor on December 31, 2008. It was also served by Harbor Airlines, which had its hub at the airport from 1971 to 2001.

Although most U.S. airports use the same three-letter location identifier for the FAA and IATA, this airport is assigned OKH by the FAA and ODW by the IATA (which assigned OKH to RAF Cottesmore in Oakham, Rutland, England).

== Facilities and aircraft ==
The airport covers an area of 54 acres (22 ha) at an elevation of 193 feet (59 m) above mean sea level. It has one runway designated 7/25 with an asphalt surface measuring 3,265 by 25 feet (995 x 8 m).

As of July 26, 2023 DeLaurentis Airport at Oak Harbor, WA has removed underground fuel tanks to replace them with above-ground tanks and fuel will be unavailable until the work is complete.

Significant repair and updating of the facilities is underway and a study is being done to improve the runway.

In February of 2024 it was announced that the airport would be set up to handle international flights and US Customs inspections for arrivals.

For the 12-month period ending May 30, 2009, the airport had 16,224 aircraft operations, an average of 44 per day: 99% general aviation and 1% air taxi. At that time there were 24 aircraft based at this airport: 87.5% single-engine and 12.5% multi-engine.

== See also ==
- List of airports in Washington
