= Island Airlines =

Coordinates: 41°40′5.43″N 70°17′19.28″W

IATA	ICAO	Call sign
IS	ISA	ISLAND
- Founded: 1930; 96 years ago
- Ceased operations: December 11, 2015; 10 years ago
- Hubs: Barnstable Municipal Airport; Nantucket Memorial Airport
- Headquarters: Barnstable, Massachusetts

Island Airlines was a commuter airline headquartered at Barnstable Municipal Airport in Barnstable, Massachusetts, United States which operated hourly scheduled flights between the island of Nantucket and Hyannis, Massachusetts. Island Airlines (Hyannis) along with its sister company, Cape & Islands Air Freight, ceased operations on December 11, 2015. The company slogan was Nantucket's Community Airline.

== History ==
Milton "Red" Hersberger, a former Chicago barnstormer, developed the first aerial transport to the island in 1930, beginning with two biplanes, and acquiring his first Ford Trimotor in 1932. He called the operation Erie Isle Airways. His first Trimotor was purchased after it had crashed in the mountains near Pittsburgh; after it was repaired and put into operation, it was so useful that four other examples soon joined the fleet. After World War II, Hersberger was able to buy several hundred surplus engines from the US government for use in the Trimotors; they cost fifteen dollars each.

Hersberger renamed the airline Sky Tours and sold it in 1953.. It was sold again in 1973. It received its current name in 1991 when ownership of the operation was assumed by William McGrath.

== Ocean Wings ==
Island Airlines operated Ocean Wings Air Charter providing private flights across the Northeast on their fleet of Beechcraft King Air, Cessna 414 and Cessna 402 aircraft. Ocean Wings was based on Nantucket out of Nantucket Memorial Airport and White Plains, New York out of Westchester County Airport.

== Cape & Islands Air Freight ==
A division of Island Airlines, Cape & Islands Air Freight, provided freight service between Nantucket, Martha's Vineyard, Hyannis, MA and New Bedford, MA. Cape & Island Air Freight also went out of business effective December 11, 2015.

== Former fleet ==
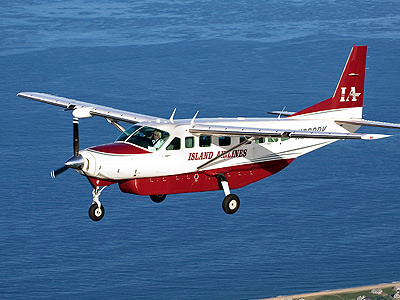
An Island Airlines Caravan over Nantucket

As of June 2013, Island Air's fleet consisted of the following aircraft:

Type	Fleet	Passengers	Use
Cessna 208 Caravan	5	8 (+1 In co-pilot seat when not in use)	Commuter
Cessna 402	3	8 (+1 In co-pilot seat when not in use)	Charter
Beechcraft King Air C90	2	6	Charter
Cessna 414	1	6	Charter
Cessna 402	1	6	Charter

=== Cessna Grand Caravans ===
In January 2009, Island Airlines announced the addition of a Grand Caravan to their fleet, becoming the first airline in over 30 years to add a new type of aircraft to the Hyannis/Nantucket route. The airline has since added three more Grand Caravans and plans to eventually transition to an all-Caravan fleet. Island Airlines was the only airline flying this type of aircraft between Hyannis and Nantucket, a market traditionally dominated by the twin–engine Cessna 402.

== See also ==
- List of defunct airlines of the United States
