= OneJet =

US airline

OneJet, Inc.
IATA	ICAO	Call sign
J1	various	see Operators
- Commenced operations: April 6, 2015; 11 years ago
- Ceased operations: August 29, 2018; 7 years ago
- Focus cities: Pittsburgh
- Fleet size: 0
- Destinations: 16
- Headquarters: Cambridge, Massachusetts
- Key people: Matthew Maguire (CEO)
- Website: www.onejet.com

OneJet is a defunct virtual airline that specialized in scheduled point-to-point flights operated by small business jets and regional aircraft. Flights were operated utilizing a public charter arrangement.

Unlike some other airlines operating small aircraft under a public charter arrangement, that operate from a private terminal or fixed-base operator facility, OneJet used the normal passenger terminals and gates of the airports to which it flew.

== History ==
The airline was established in 2009 as PrimAir and rebranded OneJet in 2014. Its first route, weekday roundtrip flights from Indianapolis International Airport to General Mitchell International Airport in Milwaukee was announced on March 15, 2015, to begin April 6, 2015. Flights were operated by Pentastar Aviation using Hawker Beechjet 400A business jets fitted with seven-passenger seats. The airline stated that additional destinations from Indianapolis would be announced in April 2015. On April 24, 2015, the airline announced service from Indianapolis to Pittsburgh International Airport to begin May 11. Service between Milwaukee and Pittsburgh was also announced that same date, due to start May 4.

On April 6, 2016, OneJet announced that it would move its base of operations from Indianapolis to Pittsburgh and that Corporate Flight Management (CFM) would take over flight operations from Pentastar. In preparation for the move, all flights from Indianapolis to Milwaukee, Memphis, and Nashville were curtailed with only the flights from Pittsburgh running. The airline indicated that it would increase the frequency of its flights from Pittsburgh; and add destinations from the Pittsburgh focus city. After a short hiatus, CFM began OneJet operations on June 8, 2016, between Pittsburgh and Hartford, with flights to Indianapolis and Milwaukee commencing six days later. Since the transition to CFM as the operating carrier, flights between Pittsburgh and Indianapolis were briefly operated by IAI Westwind and Learjet 35 aircraft rather than the Beechjet 400A.

Milwaukee was announced as a second base of operations on October 3, 2017, with flights to Columbus and Omaha starting on November 1. Later that month, OneJet signed a deal with Textron Aviation for two eight-seat Cessna Citation CJ4 aircraft to be delivered in Q1 2018, with further deliveries planned. OneJet also had plans to use a larger 30-seat Embraer ERJ135 aircraft for their future Albany-Buffalo route. On May 1, 2018, OneJet announced it was acquiring Ultimate Jetcharters and Ultimate Air Shuttle which focus on semiprivate scheduled flights and corporate shuttles. However, on August 21, it was reported that the purchase of Ultimate had fallen through.

On August 29, 2018, OneJet suspended all service, reportedly temporarily. Ultimate Jetcharters, which was operating all OneJet flights at the time, announced that it was terminating the flights due to the collapse of the acquisition deal; OneJet, in turn, announced that it was pursuing its own air operator's certificate so it could operate its own flights. OneJet claimed that it would resume booking on October 1, 2018, but as of November 30th, it had not done so; it was unknown which routes would be carried over, and whether or not any previously terminated or suspended routes will be resumed. As of September 8, 2018, OneJet has been removed from Pittsburgh International Airport's route map, implying that they will not be returning. As of August 28, 2018, the airline has also been removed from Milwaukee General Mitchell International Airport's list of airlines page. Officials from GMIA have not been informed of any schedule terminations, but confirm that no OneJet flights have been flown into or out of Milwaukee since June. All of the OneJet aircraft have either been sold or transferred to the Contour Airlines public charter services. In November 2018, airport authorities in Albany, Buffalo, and Pittsburgh filed for an involuntary Chapter 7 bankruptcy proceeding against OneJet.

== Operators ==
OneJet did not hold its own air operator's certificate when flight operations ended in August 2018. At various times, OneJet flights were operated by the following air charter companies:

- Corporate Flight Management
- Pentastar Aviation
- Ultimate Jetcharters

== Destinations ==
As of August 29, 2018 all OneJet routes have been suspended:

Focus City
Future Destinations
Seasonal
Terminated Destinations

City	State	Airport	Notes
Albany	New York	Albany International Airport	terminated
Buffalo	New York	Buffalo Niagara International Airport	terminated
Cincinnati	Ohio	Cincinnati/Northern Kentucky International Airport	terminated
Columbus	Ohio	John Glenn Columbus International Airport	terminated
Hartford	Connecticut	Bradley International Airport	terminated
Indianapolis	Indiana	Indianapolis International Airport	terminated
Kansas City	Missouri	Kansas City International Airport	terminated
Louisville	Kentucky	Louisville International Airport	terminated
Memphis	Tennessee	Memphis International Airport	terminated
Milwaukee	Wisconsin	General Mitchell International Airport	terminated
Nashville	Tennessee	Nashville International Airport	terminated
Omaha	Nebraska	Eppley Airfield	terminated
Pittsburgh	Pennsylvania	Pittsburgh International Airport	terminated
Providence	Rhode Island	T. F. Green Airport	terminated
Raleigh	North Carolina	Raleigh–Durham International Airport	never launched
Richmond	Virginia	Richmond International Airport	terminated
West Palm Beach	Florida	Palm Beach International Airport	terminated

== Former fleet ==
Aircraft	In service	Orders	Passengers	Notes
Embraer ERJ family	2	—	30	One ERJ 135, and one ERJ 145.
Hawker Beechjet 400A	8	—	7	The aircraft were the first to be used by OneJet, but have been replaced by 30 seat jets.

== See also ==
- Air transportation in the United States
- List of defunct airlines of the United States
- Contour Airlines
- Corporate Flight Management
- Ultimate Air Shuttle
