= Platinum Air Linhas Aéreas =

IATA	ICAO	Call sign
P2	PLJ	PLATINUMJET
- Founded: 2007
- Fleet size: 1
- Headquarters: São Paulo, Brazil
- Website: http://www.platinumair.com.br/

Platinum Air Linhas Aéreas was a failed airline project from São Paulo, Brazil in order to offer aircraft lease services and charter flights out of São Paulo-Guarulhos International Airport using Boeing 727-200 aircraft. Founded in early 2007, the airline never became operational and was disbranded in 2009.
