= Ports of Call Travel Club =

US air travel club turned airline (1966–1989)

Skyworld Airlines dba Ports of Call Air Skyworld Airlines Ports of Call Travel Club
- Final titles, with "Ports of Call" restored but no "Denver", Las Vegas October 1988
IATA	ICAO	Call sign
PC	SPC; SPC	PORT; SKYWORLD
- Founded: February 5, 1966 as Ports of Call Travel Club February 1986 as Skyworld Airlines June 1988 as Ports of Call Air
- Ceased operations: July 1989
- Operating bases: Denver, Colorado
- Fleet size: See Fleet below
- Parent company: Ports of Call, Inc.
- Headquarters: Denver, Colorado; United States
- Key people: Larry Turrill; Fredda Turrill
- Employees: 338 (YE 1988)

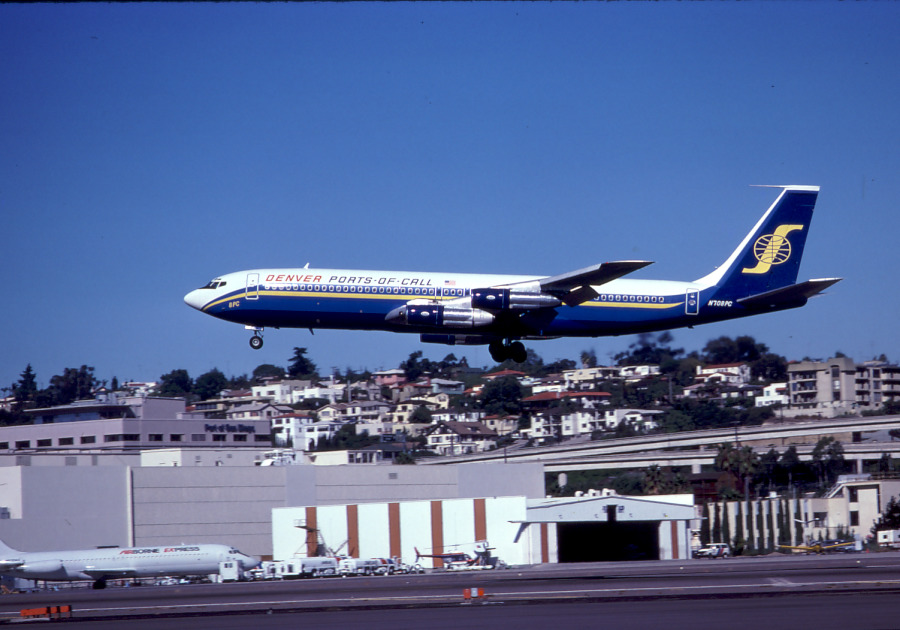
B707 San Diego 1985

Ports of Call Travel Club (POC) was, from 1966 to 1985, a Denver-based air travel club, a now-extinct non-profit form of US air transportation. The club flew aircraft with Denver Ports of Call titles ("Denver" in a different color). Since its demise, this has become a common way to refer to the club, but it was not used while the club was in operation. By the mid-1970s, the club had the largest fleet of any air travel club. The club had its own terminal (with customs facilities) and hangar at Denver's Stapleton International Airport, and, by the mid-1980s, a dozen Boeing 707s. In 1985/1986, to recover from a failed investment, the club converted to a for-profit corporation in conjunction with an initial public offering. The club's air transport function was put into a new conventional airline subsidiary Skyworld Airlines, with the club becoming Ports of Calls, Inc. The name "Skyworld" was unpopular, and in mid-1988 the airline adopted Ports of Call Air as a trade name. But expansion into charter flights was not as lucrative as expected and 707 maintenance costs increased substantially, leading to large losses. The airline ceased operations July 1989.

In 1990, Amtran, parent company of American Trans Air (which had its own former air travel club), bought the club, before selling it to management in 1993. In 1994, the club was forced into bankruptcy after it failed to operate a trip and could not provide full refunds.

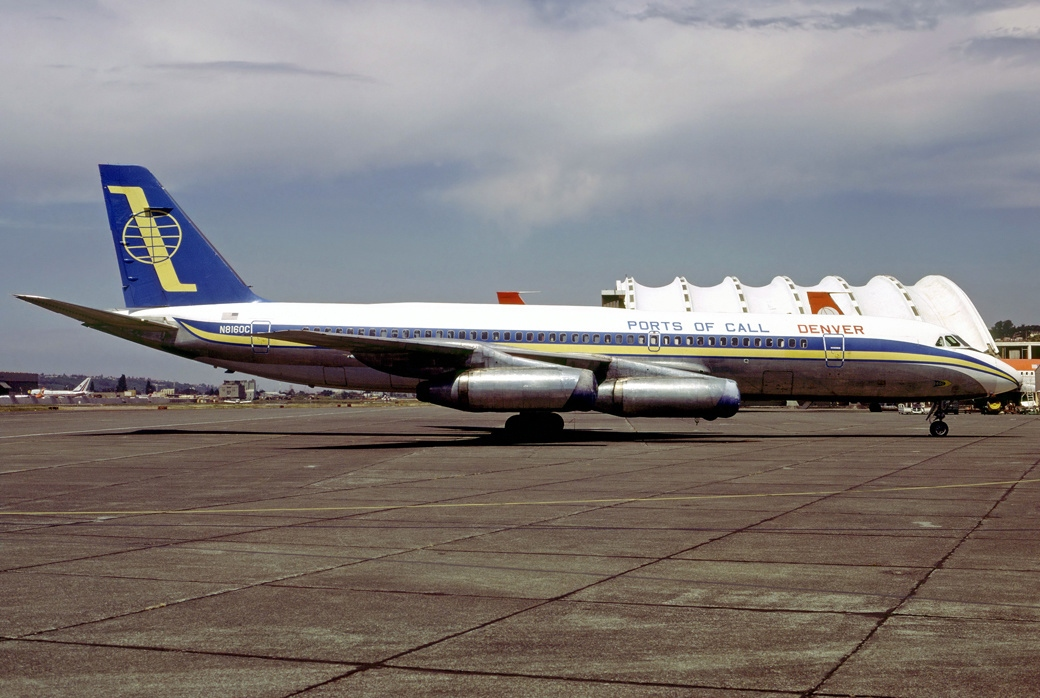
CV-990A Seattle Boeing Field 1981

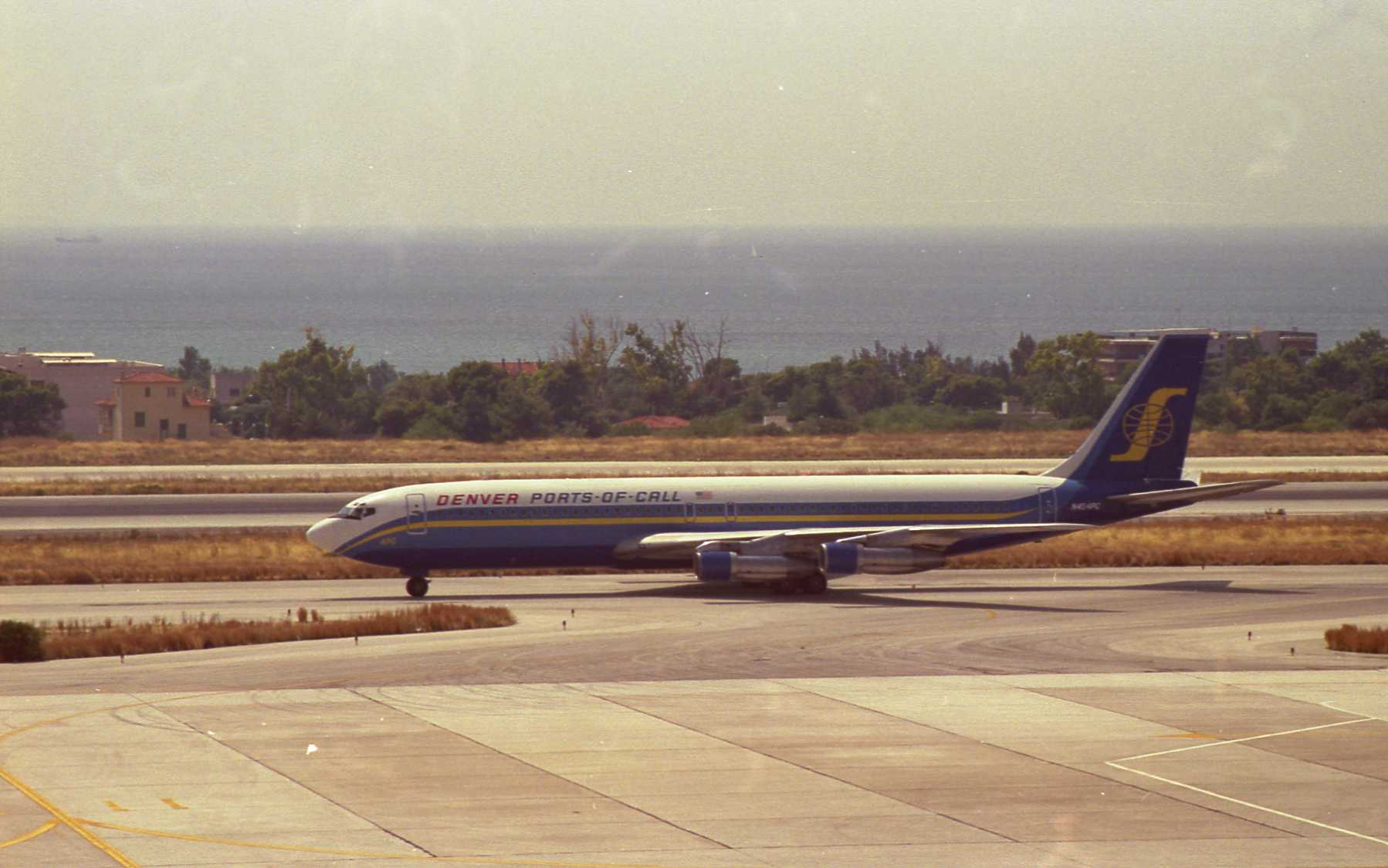
Boeing 707 Athens 1984

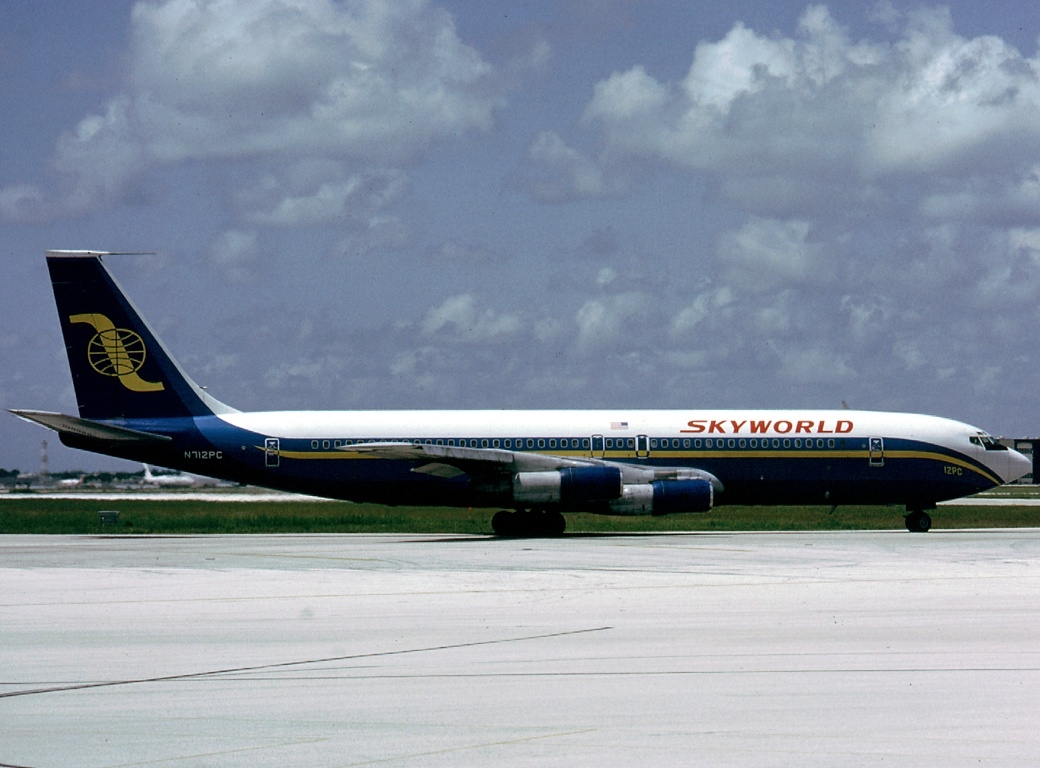
Skyworld titles, Boeing 707 Orlando 1988

== Denver Ports of Call ==
Since its demise, secondary sources have come to refer to the air travel club as "Denver Ports of Call." This was not a name the club used; in contemporary reporting, official documents (e.g. FAA) or industry sources it is always "Ports of Call" or "Skyworld Airlines."

== History ==
=== Context ===
Air travel clubs were non-profit membership organizations that had their own transport aircraft and ran their own trips, avoiding regulation by the Civil Aeronautics Board (CAB), the now defunct federal agency that, until 1979, provided tight economic regulation of almost all US commercial air transport. While unregulated by the CAB, air travel clubs were regulated for operations/safety by the FAA.

=== Rise ===
Ports of Call incorporated in Colorado 5 February 1966. In April a POC promoter was revealed to be an escaped forgery convict and captured after being shot; no money was missing. Operations started that year with a Douglas DC-7 bought for $105,000 (over $1 million in 2026 terms). The club reflected efforts of a husband and wife team. Larry Turrill led POC for over two decades, during which annual trips went from four when he joined to 26 in 1970, 140 in 1974 and hit 345 in 1978. In 1982, the foreign/domestic split was 50/50. A frequently-served destination was Mazatlan with 45 trips in 1979. Options ranged from weekend flights to fish the Pacific from the Oregon coast, to a 26-day round-the-world trip at $3995 (over $13,500 in 2026 terms). Trips might require multiple aircraft, depending on demand. Trips covered 41 states and eight foreign countries, and included three to four thousand cruise passengers a year. On occasion trips went to unusual destinations such as Cuba or Ivory Coast.

Larry's wife Fredda managed the flight attendants (FAs); POC originally used off-duty United Airlines FAs but established its own FA school in the late 1960s. FAs, who in 1982 were still all women, doubled as tour directors, responsible for practicalities, such as the delivery of luggage to hotel rooms, standard club practice. By 1982, 66,000 members could buy trips on an air-only basis, but most still opted for complete packages. Families were a majority of membership; POC ran a separate singles organization. From 1973, the club had its own terminal (including company offices) at Stapleton Airport, with its own customs and immigration facility (the club later also built a hangar). Members parked for free, the terminal was also a venue for non-club aviation and non-aviation events. A yearly favorite was the mystery trip; members knew only it would be a beach destination. Some members wore badge holders around their neck displaying a badge for each trip they made. By 1982 POC also flew charters for the Denver Broncos, University of Colorado, Colorado State University and the United States Air Force Academy.

Ports of Call was a feature of Colorado life. For instance, when in December 1984, the Denver Broncos returned home having won their division, 2,500 fans welcomed them at the POC terminal. Colorado governor Richard Lamm took his family on a Caribbean vacation—on POC.

=== Becoming an airline ===
In summer 1984, charters came to an abrupt halt when the CAB noted POC did not have required authority. At the time, POC operated under Part 125 of the Federal Aviation Regulations (FARs), which banned common carriage. POC's charter business had become high profile, having flown for the 1984 Gary Hart and Jesse Jackson presidential campaigns and including contracts with over a dozen college football teams. POC had to stop it all, as it had no economic authority to be a common carrier nor did its operating authority permit it. The club immediately applied to become a charter carrier and the DOT (successor to the CAB) gave the necessary economic authority in July 1985. In September, the FAA gave it the companion operating authority. POC's application to the CAB/DOT said it planned to remain a club.

=== Fall ===
But also in 1984, the club completed the write off of $10.6 million (over $30 million in 2026 terms) in a failed investment in a hush kit manufacturer for the Boeing 707. Noise regulations required POC's 707s be equipped with hush kits, which cost $2 million per aircraft. To fix the financial hole, POC opted to turn itself into a profit-making corporation and sell stock through an initial public offering (IPO). Members approved the new corporate form on 20 December 1985. A minority of members was unhappy at the changes and sued to stop it, delaying the IPO of Ports of Call, Inc. until 10 February. In January 1987, Larry Turrill was fired (along with wife Fredda, then VP marketing) after over two decades at the helm; a director said the nature of the company had changed substantially, given a big push in charters, and it needed new management. Other senior management had been let go at the end of 1986. The largest investor was Fidelity, which disclaimed responsibility. Membership and profit both dropped in 1986 over 1985, and the company made a small loss. Fidelity's stake kept growing; by June 1988 it held a majority of shares. In June 1988, the airline ditched the name Skyworld, becoming Ports of Call Air as a dba. Skyworld was chosen as a way to give the airline its own identity, but it "just didn't catch on."

Skyworld Airlines Financial Results^{(1)}(1) As filed with the Department of Transportation
USD 000	1986	1987	1988	1989
Operating revenue:				
Transport-related	28,181	43,550	50,845	15,596
Total	43,847	55,584	63,287	21,765
Op profit (loss)	(209)	(727)	(4,496)	(4,415)
Net profit (loss)	(93)	(3,389)	(7,056)	(4,813)
Op margin (%)	-0.5	-1.3	-7.1	-20.3

POC struggled with aging issues on the 707, the youngest in its fleet dating to 1969. The 707 was in its sunset years; the last US scheduled 707 flight was in 1983, coincidentally also the year marking the 707's 25th anniversary of commercial service. POC faced high spare parts purchases and in September 1988 had to ground five aircraft after discovering corrosion, which the FAA noted was an expensive repair. Charter demand was soft, in part because a weak US dollar suppressed travel to Europe. Layoffs followed almost immediately, with another round in April 1989 in the wake of 1988 financial results (see table), with parts of the fleet put up for sale. POC said the 707 didn't work for part of its business; an industry analyst said POC would have made money without the maintenance issue. The airline was finally grounded as of early July 1989, all airline employees laid off, the 707 fleet liquidated, again citing 707 maintenance expense. The club business was said to be sound, but was sold, at a loss, for only $500,000, to Amtran, parent of American Trans Air (ATA), which had its own former air travel club Ambassadair. By March 1990, the company's sole material asset was $5.9 million in cash. Fidelity made a substantial loss on its investment.

In 1993, Amtran sold Ports of Call to its management. In 1994, the club cancelled a trip at the last minute and was unable to provide full refunds. The club went bankrupt and ceased business.

== Fleet ==
In October 1973, the club got its first Convair 990, which grew to an operating fleet of five, plus two additional used for parts. In 1980, POC acquired its first Boeing 707; by 1985 the 990s phased out and there were a dozen 707s. From 1981 to end of 1987 the club had a single Boeing 727-100.

As of 31 December 1975, Ports of Call had the largest fleet of any air travel club with:

- 3 Convair 990
- 1 Lockheed L-188 Electra
- 1 Douglas DC-7

Ports of Call, 31 December 1979:

- 5 Convair 990

Skyworld, 31 December 1985:

- 3 Boeing 707-100B
- 8 Boeing 707-300B
- 1 Boeing 707-300C
- 1 Boeing 727-100

1987-88 World Airline Fleets (copyright 1987) shows Skyworld with a fleet of:

- 1 Boeing 707-100B
- 7 Boeing 707-300B
- 1 Boeing 707-300C
- 1 Boeing 727-100

Ports of Call Air, April 1989:

- 3 Boeing 707-100B
- 7 Boeing 707-300B

== Incidents ==
- 19 April 1976: A man awaiting sentencing for his third drunk driving conviction (a felony in his jurisdiction) held a pilot and mechanic at gunpoint at the airport at Grand Island, Nebraska and forced them to fly him in a light aircraft to Stapleton Airport, where he demanded a plane to Mexico. POC offered the use of a Convair 990, including a volunteer crew. Disguised FBI agents shot and killed the gunman while he inspected the aircraft.

== See also ==
- Air travel club
- List of defunct airlines of the United States
