= Pacific East Airlines =

- Schedule with Pacific East Logo
IATA	ICAO	Call sign
6P	PCE	-
- Commenced operations: 1983; 43 years ago
- Ceased operations: 1984; 42 years ago
- Fleet size: See Fleet below
- Destinations: See Destinations below

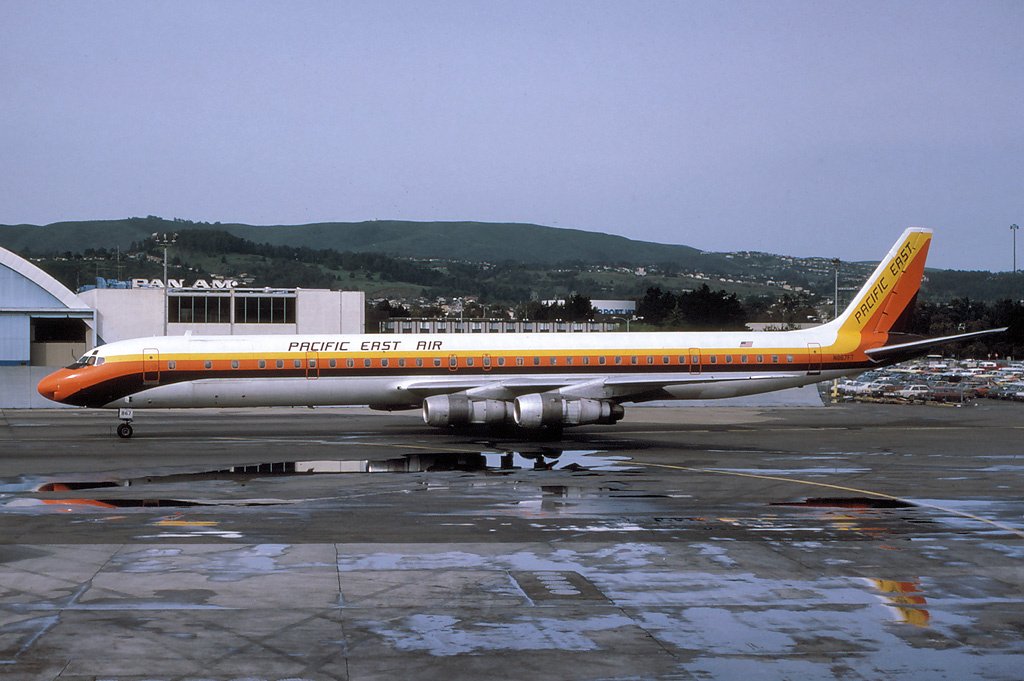
Pacific East Air Super DC-8-61 in 1983

Pacific East Airlines, also known as Pacific East Air, was a short-lived airline based in Los Angeles, California that ceased operation in 1984.

== History ==
Pacific East Air was formed in 1981 by former Western Airlines employees to primarily serve the Los Angeles - Honolulu route using Douglas DC-8-61 aircraft. Shortly after scheduled passenger operations were initiated, the route network was expanded in 1982 to include a nonstop San Francisco - Honolulu flight, and also nonstop Los Angeles - Salt Lake City and nonstop Salt Lake City - Chicago flights. To increase capacity McDonnell Douglas DC-10s as well as additional DC-8s were acquired. A new route between New York City and Hawaii via Los Angeles was opened in 1983 with new nonstop service being introduced to Kahului, Maui from Los Angeles as well while flights serving Chicago and Salt Lake City were discontinued; however, although the airline was carrying many passengers, it was losing money.

Bad management decisions, failure to book passengers on other flights due to cancellations and overbooking led to a CAB investigation and unfavorable reviews with passengers led to the withdrawal of the operating license by authorities and ultimate bankruptcy in August 1984.

== Destinations ==
Pacific East Air served the following destinations during its existence with not all of these destinations being served at the same time.

- Chicago, Illinois (ORD)
- Honolulu, Hawaii (HNL)
- Los Angeles, California (LAX) - the airline used the West Imperial Terminal at LAX
- Kahului, Maui, Hawaii (OGG)
- New York, New York (JFK)
- Ontario, California (ONT)
- Salt Lake City, Utah (SLC)
- San Francisco, California (SFO)

== Fleet ==
- Douglas DC-8-61
- Douglas DC-8-62
- Douglas DC-8-63
- Douglas DC-8-71
- McDonnell Douglas DC-10 (for the 1983-84 winter season)

All of the DC-8 jets operated by Pacific East Air were stretched Super DC-8 aircraft.

== See also ==
- List of defunct airlines of the United States
