= Nations Air =

Airline in the United States

Nations Air Express
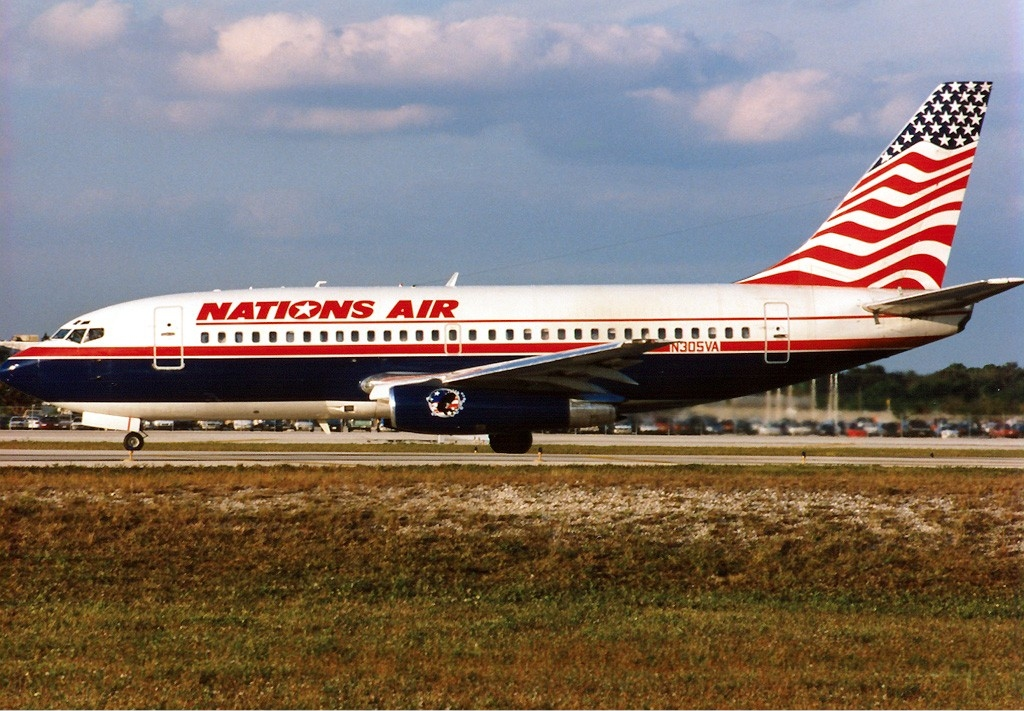
- Nations Air Express Boeing 737-200 at Fort Lauderdale, 1996
IATA	ICAO	Call sign
N5	NAE	NATIONS AIR EXPRESS
- Commenced operations: March 6, 1995; 31 years ago
- Ceased operations: September 1, 1999; 27 years ago
- Operating bases: Pittsburgh International Airport
- Fleet size: 4 Boeing 737 and 4 Boeing 727
- Key people: Mark McDonald (CEO)

Nations Air was a new start up airline in the United States that began operating in 1995 that was established as Miami Air Charter in 1987 and ceased operations in 2000.

It was not related to a similarly-named airline based in Canada, Nationair, which had ceased operations prior to Nations Air's establishment.

== History ==
Nations Air began as a passenger airline with three Boeing 737-200 jetliners, adding four Boeing 727 within the first year. Scheduled services were operated between Pittsburgh, Philadelphia and Boston. The airline quickly faced aggressive competition, "Justice Probes USAir's Actions In Fare Battles; Airline Denies 'Predatory' Tactics Against ValuJet and Nations Air The Washington Post; August 15, 1995", as well as a five day voluntary "no-fly" consent over a clerical error on a training form which required the pilots to repeat a single maneuver in the Boeing simulator. According to the Department of Transportation data, Nations Air increased the passenger traffic in these markets dramatically; specifically, the passenger traffic in the Pittsburgh/Philadelphia market by 200%. Nations Air was the first airline to start scheduled jet passenger service to Myrtle Beach South Carolina, connecting Pittsburgh and Boston through Philadelphia, Pennsylvania to Myrtle Beach, South Carolina. Nations Air also provided Boeing 727 contract schedule service to Pan Am World Airways, Air Jamaica and the U.S. Immigration service. In March 1996, Nations Air announced extensive expansion plans to the route structure connecting the Philadelphia hub to destinations of Fort Lauderdale, Orlando and Tampa/St.Petersburg Florida.

Nations Air was established as Miami Air Charter in 1987. Miami Air Charter became one of the most successful charter operations in Florida, operating both passenger and cargo aircraft. Miami Air Charter's CEO Mark McDonald orchestrated a private equity placement with Accredited Investors issuing Preferred A and B stock for the capital requirements to support the airlines expansion.

The demise of scheduled service for Nations Air occurred after the Valujet crash in the Florida Everglades. Nations Air CEO Mark McDonald reported that reservations/income had dropped by 42% within six days after the Valuejet tragedy and made the difficult decision to discontinue the scheduled service in an effort for the company to survive. The aircraft dedicated on the scheduled route structure were deployed to the charter market. His 737's on contracts with the US Immigration service and with the casino/hotel markets in Atlantic City and Gulfport/Biloxi. The 727 were contracted to Air Jamaica, Aero Costa-Rica, Air Haiti and on demand for other Caribbean Airlines.

== Service in 1995 ==
According to the December 1, 1995 Nations Air system timetable, scheduled service was being operated on a linear Boston (BOS)-Philadelphia (PHL)-Pittsburgh (PIT) routing. Fares were as low as $59 one way BOS-PHL and PHL-PIT.

== Service in 1999 ==
According to the June 1, 1999 Official Airline Guide (OAG), the airline was flying scheduled nonstop service between Gulfport, MS (GPT) and Atlanta (ATL) four times a week.

== Fleet ==
- 2 Boeing 727-200 (N12304, N258US) leased from Pegasus Aviation

== See also ==
- List of defunct airlines of the United States
