= Private Jet Expeditions =

Charter airline of the United States (1989–1995)

- Private Jet Expeditions logo
IATA	ICAO	Call sign
5J	PJE	Pee Jay
- Commenced operations: 1989; 37 years ago
- Ceased operations: March 1995; 31 years ago
- Hubs: Hartsfield–Jackson Atlanta International Airport
- Fleet size: See Fleet below
- Parent company: OASIS Group
- Headquarters: Wichita, Kansas, then Atlanta, Georgia
- Key people: Jack P. DeBoer

Private Jet Expeditions was a United States charter airline which also operated scheduled passenger service that was part of the OASIS Group from Spain. In 1994 it marketed scheduled services in the United States as National Airlines.

== History ==
Private Jet Expeditions was founded in 1989 by Wichita, Kansas entrepreneur Jack P. DeBoer and began operations with a former Trans World Airlines (TWA) Boeing 727 aircraft to tourist destinations around the world operating under FAR Part 121. After Deboer sold the company its headquarters was moved to Atlanta, GA and was later owned by Apple Vacations and then by the Spanish consortium OASIS. When Oasis took over, the McDonnell Douglas MD-83 was put into service and service was expanded, including scheduled passenger flights. In 1993 it had a scheduled route from Chicago to Atlanta and on to Miami. According to the September 15, 1994 edition of the Official Airline Guide (OAG), the air carrier was operating McDonnell Douglas DC-9-50 and MD-80 jetliners as National Airlines with the same "5J" airline code used by Private Jet Expeditions. According to the OAG, routes at this time included Miami - Atlanta - Dallas/Fort Worth - Las Vegas; New York LaGuardia Airport - Atlanta - Dallas/Fort Worth; Miami - Atlanta - New York LaGuardia Airport; and Chicago Midway Airport - Atlanta - St. Thomas - St.Croix. At one point, an MD-80 was leased from French carrier Air Liberté and used by Private Jet to briefly operate a scheduled Chicago Midway Airport - San Francisco route while retaining the full livery of the French carrier. Because of poor load factors these scheduled routes were abandoned in 1994 and shortly thereafter Chapter 11 bankruptcy protection was sought. The charter operations also did not go well and by March 1995 operations were permanently suspended.

== Destinations in August 1994 ==
According to its August 12, 1994 timetable and route map, Private Jet Expeditions was operating scheduled passenger flights as National Airlines with service to the following destinations:

- Atlanta, GA - Hartsfield–Jackson Atlanta International Airport - Hub
- Chicago, IL - Chicago Midway International Airport
- Cincinnati, OH - Cincinnati/Northern Kentucky International Airport
- Dallas, TX/Fort Worth, TX - Dallas/Fort Worth International Airport
- Las Vegas, NV - McCarran International Airport
- Miami, FL - Miami International Airport
- New York City, NY - LaGuardia Airport
- St. Croix - Henry E. Rohlsen Airport
- St. Louis, MO - Lambert–St. Louis International Airport
- St. Thomas - Cyril E. King Airport
- Washington, D.C./Dulles, VA - Washington Dulles International Airport

== Fleet ==
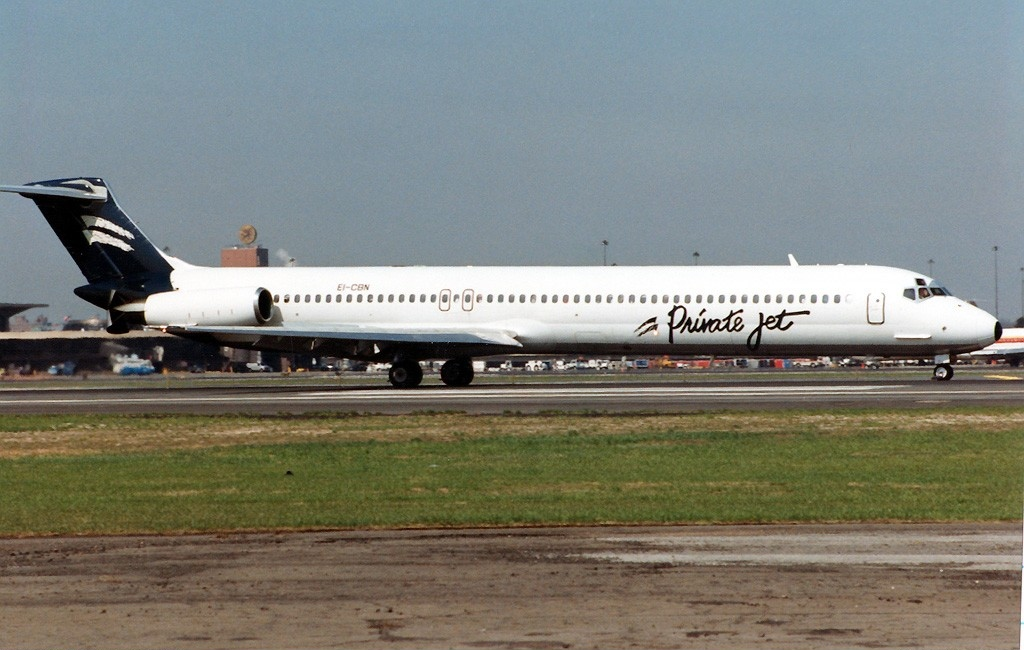
A Private Jet Expeditions McDonnell Douglas MD-83 in 1993

Private Jet Expeditions historical fleet
Aircraft	Total	Introduced	Retired	Remark
Boeing 727-100	1	1989	1991	N727PJ
Boeing 727-200	3	1992	1994	
McDonnell Douglas MD-82	1	1993	1994	N500TR

== See also ==
- List of defunct airlines of the United States
