= Kodiak Airways =

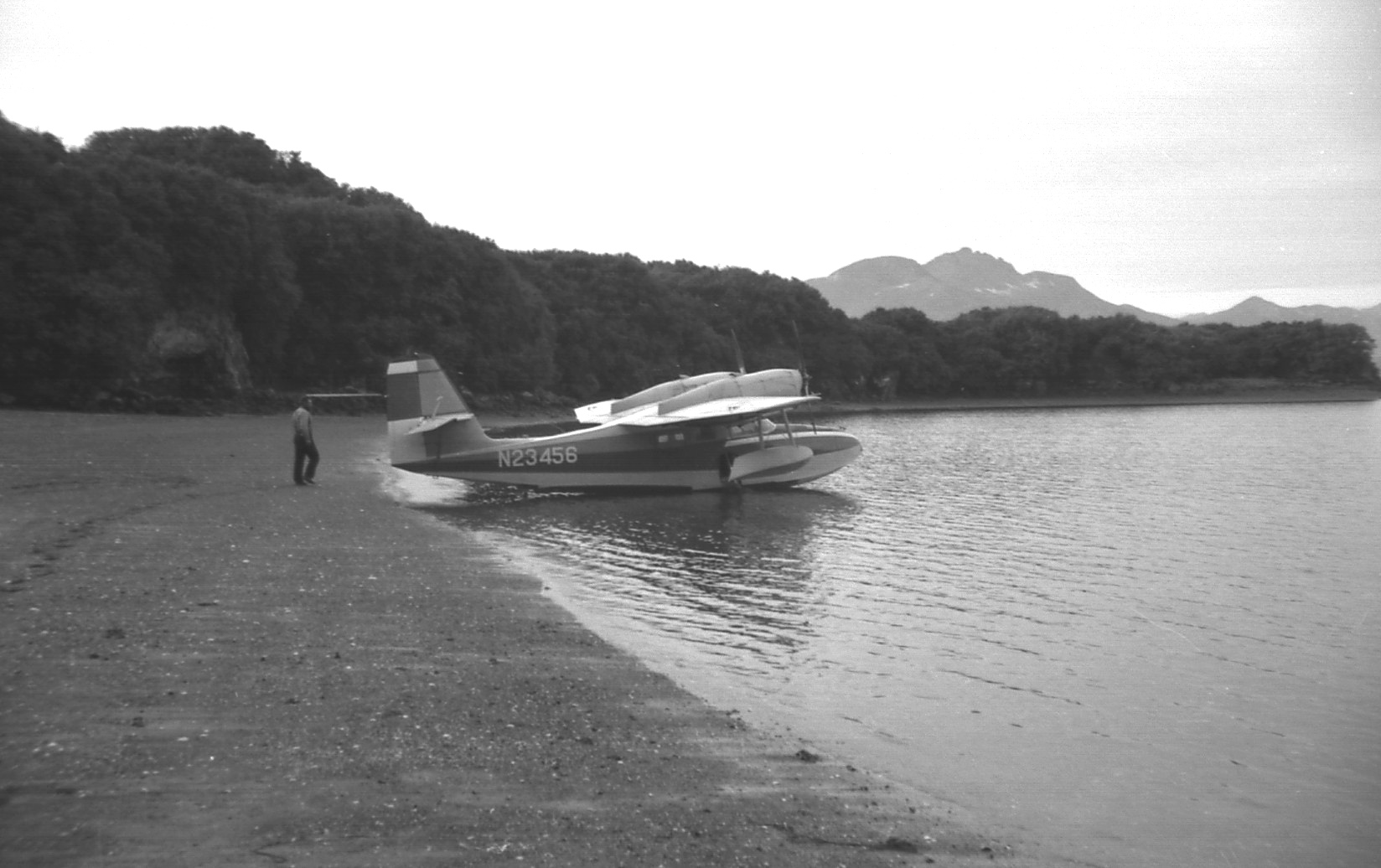
IATA	ICAO	Call sign
-	-	-
- Ceased operations: 1973 (merged with Western Alaska Airlines)
- Hubs: Kodiak
- Fleet size: not specified
- Destinations: Alaska
- Key people: Bob Hall (founder)

Kodiak Airways was a Kodiak-based bush carrier that existed from 1960 to 1973. Kodiak Airways had been long contracted to give mail to the small town.

== History ==
The airline was founded by Bob Hall. In the 1950s the airline added a few SeaBees and Grumman goose aircraft, the first Goose was added in 1950. In the year of 1961 a Goose owned by the airline was destroyed in a crash. Kodiak Airways in 1969 had a metal tree in its waiting room in December of 1969. In the year of 1970 a Cessna owned by the airline was destroyed in a crash.

By 1971 the airline had its own terminal at Kodiak Airport. The airline in the year of 1973 merged with Western Alaska Airlines to form Kodiak Western Alaska Airlines.

== Pricing ==
Historically the sold tickets for the price of $25 USD, this was in the time when 25 dollars was worth much more.

== Destinations ==
- Kodiak
- Spruce Island (sightseeing flights)
- Old Harbor
- Kaguyak
- Lazy Bay
- Moser Bay
- Olga Bay

== Accidents ==
- On Christmas Eve 1961 a Grunmann Goose registered as N1503V crashed after takeoff killing 1 person. It appears that this accident was the only one properly documented
- On October 2 1970 a Cessna 207 of the airline crashed after stalling
- On December 11 1974 a Kodiak Airways Grunmann Goose crashed after losing control but due to lack of evidence the crash could not be determined.

== See also ==
List of defunct airlines of the United States
