= Midwest Aviation =

IATA	ICAO	Call sign
-	-	-
- Commenced operations: 1973; 53 years ago
- Ceased operations: 1983; 43 years ago
- Operating bases: New Ulm, Minnesota, United States; Marshall, Minnesota, United States
- Destinations: See Destinations below

Midwest Aviation was a commuter airline based first in New Ulm, Minnesota then in Marshall, Minnesota. From 1973 to 1977, the airline operated under the name Air New Ulm and from 1977 to 1979 under the name Lake State Airways. The airline operated from 1979 until 1983 under its final name, Midwest Aviation, before folding. The airline was based at the Minneapolis-St. Paul International Airport.

At one point Midwest Aviation offered flights between the Minneapolis-St. Paul International Airport and St. Paul. At the time it cost $5USD one-way and $10 round-trip to fly between the two adjacent cities.

== Destinations ==
Note that this list includes destinations of Midwest Aviation, Air New Ulm, and Lake State Airways.

- Iowa
  - Dubuque (Dubuque Regional Airport)
- Minnesota
  - Marshall (Southwest Minnesota Regional Airport)*
  - Minneapolis-St. Paul International Airport
  - New Ulm (New Ulm Municipal Airport)*
  - St. Paul (St. Paul Downtown Airport)*
- South Dakota
  - Sioux Falls (Sioux Falls Regional Airport)

Those airports marked with an asterisk (*) are no longer served by scheduled airline service.

== See also ==
- List of defunct airlines of the United States
