= Mid-Atlantic Freight =

American charter airline

IATA	ICAO	Call sign
-	MDC	NIGHT SHIP
- Founded: 1990; 36 years ago
- Ceased operations: 2005; 21 years ago
- Fleet size: 8
- Parent company: Atlantic Aero Inc
- Headquarters: Greensboro, North Carolina, United States
- Website: http://www.atlantic-aero.com/

Mid-Atlantic Freight was an American charter airline based in Greensboro, North Carolina, United States. It operated charter overnight freight feeder services. Its main base was Piedmont Triad International Airport, Greensboro.

== History ==
The airline was established on 1 January 1990 and started operations on 1 February 1990. It was set up as a sister company of Atlantic Aero with common management and has 8 employees (at March 2007). The Airline merged into Martinaire.

== Accidents and incidents ==
- 23 October 2002 - Mid-Atlantic Freight Cessna 208B Cargomaster I, on a flight between Mobile International Airport and Montgomery Regional Airport in Alabama, crashed after an uncontrolled descent into Big Bateau Bay, roughly 5 miles (8.0 km) from Spanish Fort. It was suspected that the pilot's spatial disorientation, resulted in the loss of airplane control. The pilot was killed. There was no one else on board the aircraft. One theory said the aircraft collided with something. The engine was split in two, possibly prior to impact.

== Fleet ==
As of March 2009 the Mid-Atlantic Freight fleet includes:

- 8 – Cessna 208 Caravan

== See also ==
- List of defunct airlines of the United States
