= Kitty Hawk Airways =

Kitty Hawks Airways
IATA	ICAO	Call sign
2K	KHA	-
- Commenced operations: 1978; 47 years ago
- Ceased operations: 1990; 35 years ago
- Operating bases: Dallas Love Field
- Headquarters: Dallas, Texas, United States

Kitty Hawks Airways was founded in 1978, and offered passenger service that year only. It was based at Dallas Love Field in Dallas in Dallas County, Texas. In 1987 the airlines acquired Skyfreighters in order to get the acquisition of FAR Part 121 certificate.

In 1990, the airline business was discontinued.

== See also ==
- List of defunct airlines of the United States
