= MetJet =

Airline of the United States

MetJet was a charter operator (chartered from Sun Country) based in De Pere, Wisconsin. Its flights originated from Austin Straubel Airport in Green Bay. It served destinations such as Fort Myers and Orlando. On October 15, 2013, the company announced that it was ceasing operations effective October 26, 2013 (11 years ago) due to a lack of demand.

== Destinations and Departures ==
Frequency	Destination
1/7	Cancún International Airport
2/7	Orlando International Airport
4/7	Minneapolis/St. Paul International Airport
1/7	Southwest Florida International Airport

== See also ==
- List of defunct airlines of the United States
