= Focus Air Cargo =

IATA	ICAO	Call sign
F2	FKS	FOCUS
- Founded: 2004; 22 years ago
- Ceased operations: 2008; 18 years ago
- Hubs: Fort Lauderdale-Hollywood International Airport
- Focus cities: BKK, CDG, FRA, MIA, BOG
- Fleet size: 0
- Destinations: N/A
- Headquarters: Fort Lauderdale, Florida
- Key people: Carsten Petersen, David McElroy, David Hoffstetter, David Lagger, Greg Vanek
- Website: none

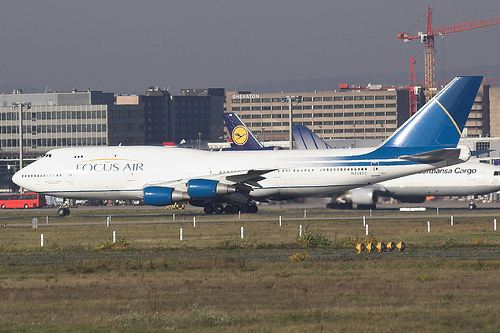
Focus Air Boeing 747-300 N354FC (2006)

Focus Air Cargo was a cargo airline based in Fort Lauderdale, Florida, United States. It provided all-cargo services on wet leases.

== History ==
Focus Air Cargo was established as Omega Air Cargo but was renamed in March 2004.

In July 2008, the Aircraft Operating Certificate was surrendered to the FAA and the airline ceased operations, but continued to honor obligations until 2012. Headed up by industry veteran and People Express Airlines founders David McElroy. Key managers included: Carsten Petersen, David Hoffstetter, David Lagger, Frank Esopi and Greg Vanek.

== Fleet ==
The Focus Air cargo fleet consisted of the following aircraft (at December 2007):

- 3 Boeing 747-200F (2) Rolls-Royce RB-211 N361FC and N362FC (ex-Malaysian) (1) GE CF6 N535MC (ex-Atlas)
- 1 Boeing 747-300F N354MC then N354FC (ex-Atlas)

== Destinations ==
- Belgium - Brussels, Ostend
- Brazil - São Paulo, Fortaleza
- China - Hong Kong
- Colombia - Bogotá
- Costa Rica - Alajuela
- France - Paris-CDG
- Germany - Düsseldorf, Frankfurt
- Luxembourg - Luxembourg
- Malaysia - Kuala Lumpur
- Netherlands - Amsterdam, Maastricht
- Portugal - Lisbon
- Sweden - Stockholm-Arlanda, Malmo
- Switzerland - Geneva, Zurich, Basel
- United Kingdom - Manchester, London, Glasgow
- United Arab Emirates - Sharajah, Dubai
- United States Fort Lauderdale, Miami, New York-JFK, SFO

== See also ==
- List of defunct airlines of the United States
