= New Ulm Municipal Airport =

- IATA: ULM; ICAO: KULM; FAA LID: ULM

Summary
- Airport type: Public
- Operator: City of New Ulm
- Location: New Ulm, Minnesota
- Elevation AMSL: 1,011 ft / 308.2 m
- Coordinates: 44°19′10″N 094°30′08″W

Map
- Location of airport in Minnesota/United States ULM (the United States)

Runways
Direction	Length		Surface
Direction	ft	m	Surface
15/33	5,401	1,341	Asphalt
4/22	2,825	861	Grass

New Ulm Municipal Airport (IATA: ULM, ICAO: KULM, FAA LID: ULM) is a public airport located two statute miles (3 km) west of the central business district (CBD) of New Ulm, a city in Brown County, Minnesota, United States. This general aviation airport covers 195 acres (79 ha) and has two runways. Operational since September 1945, scheduled airline service was once available on Midwest Aviation, also known as Lake State Airways, though today only charter flights are offered by the city's New Ulm Flight Service, founded in the 1960s.

The airport is home to an annual fly-in pancake breakfast, which serves as the New Ulm Lion Club's biggest fundraiser of the year.

== Facilities and aircraft ==
New Ulm has two runways. Runway 15/33 is 5401 x 100 ft and is made of asphalt, while runway 4/22 is 2478 x 160 ft and is turf.

For the 12-month period ending April 30, 2018, the airport has 15,330 operations per year, or 42 per day. This includes 21% general aviation, 29% air taxi, and <1% military. For the same time period, there are 13 aircraft based on the field: 11 single-engine and 2 multi-engine airplanes.

The airport has one FBO offering fuel, a courtesy car, a crew lounge, and more.

== Accidents & Incidents ==
- On February 9, 2022, a Piper PA-46 Malibu made an emergency landing at New Ulm due to engine troubles while en route to Fargo, North Dakota. Nobody on board was injured.

== See also ==
- List of airports in Minnesota
