= National Florida Airlines =

IATA	ICAO	Call sign
—	NFA	VOYAGER
- Commenced operations: 1981; 44 years ago
- Ceased operations: December 2, 1983; 41 years ago
- Operating bases: Daytona Beach, Florida
- Fleet size: See Fleet below

National Florida Airlines was a commuter airline based in Daytona, Florida. National Florida flew several cities in central and south Florida. NFA declared Chapter 7 Bankruptcy on December 2, 1983.

== History ==
National Florida Airlines was founded in 1981, and started operations in December. NFA started flying to Miami, Orlando, Tampa, out of Daytona Beach. In 1982, NFA added service to Fort Walton Beach and Fort Lauderdale.

== Destinations ==
In 1983, NFA flew to six cities in Florida

- Daytona Beach, FL (Hub)
- Miami, FL
- Orlando, FL
- Tampa, FL
- Fort Lauderdale, FL
- Ft. Walton Beach/Elgin A.F.B.

== Fleet ==
National Florida's fleet in 1983

- de Havilland Canada DHC-6 Twin Otter (N1345U, N778CC, N779CC, N794CC)
- Fairchild Swearingen Metroliner (N602AS)
- Piper PA-31 Navajo

== See also ==
- List of defunct airlines of the United States
