= Harbor Airlines =

American airline from 1971 to 2001

IATA	ICAO	Call sign
HB	HAR	HARBOR
- Founded: March 1971; 55 years ago
- Ceased operations: 2001; 25 years ago
- Operating bases: Seattle–Tacoma Airport; Oak Harbor Airport
- Headquarters: Oak Harbor (1971–1996); Gig Harbor (1996–2001)
- Key people: Wes Lupien; (founder, owner 1971–1996); Richard Boehlke; (owner, president, CEO 1996–2001)
- Employees: 100 (2001)

Harbor Airlines (also known as Harbor Air) was a commuter airline from the United States, which existed from 1971 to 2001. Based at Oak Harbor, Washington, it operated regional passenger flights in the Puget Sound area.

== History ==
The airline was founded as Oak Harbor Airlines by Jerry Petterson and Wes Lupien (the owner of Oak Harbor Airport) in March 1971. In May 1974, it shortened its name to simply Harbor Airlines. In the early 1980s, the airline served the Puget Sound area of Washington state.

In the mid-1970s, the airline's fleet comprised five BN-2A Islander craft. By the early 1980s, an Embraer EMB 110 Bandeirante had been added to the fleet. By 2001, these had been replaced with five Cessna Grand Caravan.

In 1996, the company was bought by Richard Boehlke and subsequently moved its headquarters from Oak Harbor to Gig Harbor. Over the following years, Harbor Airlines encountered a series of financial problems, which culminated in being evicted from Seattle–Tacoma International Airport (the most important destination in its route network) in March 2001 due to unpaid bills worth US$100,000. The airline reacted by relocating its flights to nearby Boeing Field.

In a 1999 ranking of regional and commuter airlines by total passenger enplanements, Harbor Airlines ranked 40th out of 50.

In early May 2001, Harbor Airlines suspended all flight activities and its then 100 employees were dismissed. The company's bankruptcy also affected Oak Harbor Airport, of which Harbor Airlines was still the owner.

== Route network ==
Upon closure, Harbor Airlines offered scheduled flights from Seattle to Oak Harbor, Orcas Island, Port Angeles and San Juan Island, and maintained codeshare agreements with Alaska Airlines and Horizon Air.

In the mid 1970s, destinations included Seattle, Oak Harbor, Bellingham, and Hoquiam in Washington State; and Astoria and Portland in Oregon. Hoquiam began as a destination in July 1974 when Harbor took over a route from Hughes Airwest, but was discontinued in January 1975 due to lack of business. In 1979 and 1981, destinations which could be reached directly from Seattle were Bellingham, Oak Harbor and Mount Vernon. An international route to Canada, linking Seattle (via Bellingham) with Vancouver, was inaugurated on June 12, 1981.

== Accidents and incidents ==
Harbor Airlines suffered one fatal accident, which occurred on December 26, 1974, in snowy weather conditions. Flight 308, a Britten-Norman Islander (registered N66HA) en route from Seattle to Oak Harbor crashed in Riverton, Washington four minutes after takeoff, killing four of the six occupants (the pilot and three passengers) on board. A fourth passenger died of their injuries several days after the crash while in hospital. This was an urban crash, landing in the middle of a street and striking power lines on its way down. During the subsequent investigation, an unknown substance was found inside the pitot tubes of the aircraft, which had caused unreliable airspeed readings.

== See also ==
- List of defunct airlines of the United States
