= Air Chaparral =

American regional airline

IATA	ICAO	Call sign
IV	CPL	Maverick
- Founded: 1980; 46 years ago
- Commenced operations: 1980; 46 years ago
- Ceased operations: 1983; 43 years ago
- Headquarters: Reno, Nevada, United States

Air Chaparral was an American regional airline. It was active from 1980 through 1983 with its main office located in Reno, Nevada and a maintenance base located in a former military alert hangar at Spokane, Washington. It provided scheduled passenger airline service to a number of destinations in Nevada with connecting flights also operated to Salt Lake City, Utah and Hawthorne, California. It also provided both scheduled and non-scheduled (Part 135) air freight service.

The airline's flight call sign was Maverick, used to identify company aircraft to aircraft controllers and tower personnel.

Another regional air carrier using a similar name was Chaparral Airlines based at the Abilene Regional Airport in Texas which operated American Eagle (airline brand) service via a code sharing agreement on behalf of American Airlines.

== History ==
In 1981 Air Chaparral acquired the operating assets of Inland Empire Airlines (IEA), a California-based commuter air carrier that operated scheduled passenger service with Fairchild F-27 propjets in addition to Swearingen Metro II and Metro III propjets as well as Piper Navajo Chieftain prop aircraft, with this carrier being initially established as Pomona Valley Aviation in 1968. Inland Empire flew scheduled passenger service to destinations primarily in California but also to Arizona and Nevada as well. Cities served by Inland Empire from 1979 to 1982 included Los Angeles (LAX), San Francisco (SFO), San Jose (SJC), Sacramento (SMF), Burbank (BUR), Ontario (ONT) and Las Vegas (LAS) as well as smaller destinations including Palm Springs (PSP), Fresno (FAT), Stockton (SCK), Modesto (MOD), Merced (MCE), Visalia (VIS), Inyokern (IYK), Apple Valley (APV), La Verne (POC), Bullhead City (IFP), Lake Havasu City (HII) and Grand Canyon National Park Airport (GCN). Inland Empire continued to operate under its own name, and when Air Chaparral filed for bankruptcy in 1983, Inland Empire once again became an independent, stand-alone company. According to its March 1983 system timetable, Inland Empire (IEA) was based in Reno, Nevada at this time and was operating scheduled passenger flights in California with Fairchild F-27 and Swearingen Metro turboprop aircraft with service to San Francisco (SFO), Los Angeles (LAX), Ontario (ONT), Fresno (FAT), Stockton (SCK), Modesto (MOD), Merced (MCE) and Visalia (VIS).

On 22 July 1981 the United States Air Force chose not to renew a lease with Air Chaparral, under which AC had been providing three turboprop-powered aircraft to the government. The Air Force issued a solicitation for other providers, but when no bids were submitted in the first round, AC officers formed a wholly owned subsidiary company (Huff Leasing Company), and submitted a bid under that name. There were two bidders under that round of solicitations, and Huff was the low bidder, receiving the Air Force nod to provide the aircraft. However, the other bidder objected, pointing out that Huff was merely a shell for the previously-rejected AC. The Air Force agreed and voided its lease with Huff. Huff appealed, but the appeal was denied by the US Court of Appeals for District of Columbia District in a 2 September 1983 decision. By that time, Air Chaparral had ceased operations and had filed for bankruptcy.

== Destinations ==
The airline division of Air Chaparral began flying in 1980, with Donald Simon as its president. Nevada cities served according to its flight schedules included:

- Austin, Nevada
- Elko, Nevada
- Ely, Nevada
- Fallon, Nevada
- Las Vegas, Nevada
- Reno, Nevada
- Tonopah, Nevada
- Winnemucca, Nevada

Air Chaparral also provided overnight freight service to GELCO Courier, transporting canceled checks overnight to Federal Reserve Bank locations along the US west coast. Flights operated between:

- Spokane, WA
- Seattle, WA (Boeing Field)
- Portland, OR
- Oakland, CA
- Burbank, CA

== Accidents and incidents ==
- On 2 March 1981, a Cessna T210N, registration N77FB, en route from Fallon to Austin crashed in foul weather. Both the pilot and the single passenger died in the accident. As a result of this accident the US Civil Aeronautics Board reviewed Air Chaparral's "commuter carrier fitness determination" in a 16 April 1981 board meeting in Washington, D.C.
- On 28 December 1981, an Air Chaparral cargo flight, a Cessna 402C, registration N2749N, traveling from Spokane, Washington to Lewiston, Idaho, crashed while attempting to land at the Pullman, Washington airport during a heavy snowstorm. The airplane struck a ridge about one-half-mile (0.8 km) north of the airport, killing the pilot, who was the sole occupant. Investigators determined that visibility conditions at the time of the crash were below landing minimums for that airport. Additionally, the runway was temporarily closed at the time of the crash while crews were on the runway clearing snow (NTSB SEA82FA014). The pilot had 13,000 hours of flight time.

== See also ==
- List of defunct airlines of the United States
