= Freedom Bird =

Freedom Bird may refer to:

- Government contract flight
- Liberation Tigers of Tamil Eelam § Women in LTTE
- Name of the DC-10 Aircraft N701TZ / N139WA written off during a hard landing in Baltimore (BWI) while being operated by World Airways instead of ATA Airlines due to an asset transfer initiated by MatlinPatterson's Global Aero Logistics.

== See also ==
- Kurdistan Freedom Hawks a Kurdish militant group
