= Bishop International Airport =

Airport in Flint, Michigan, United States

- IATA: FNT; ICAO: KFNT; FAA LID: FNT

Summary
- Airport type: Public
- Owner/Operator: Bishop International Airport Authority
- Serves: Flint, Michigan
- Location: 3425 W. Bristol Road; Flint, Michigan, 48507; United States
- Operating base for: Allegiant Air
- Elevation AMSL: 782 ft (238 m)
- Coordinates: 42°57′56″N 083°44′36″W
- Public transit access: Flint MTA 11
- Website: www.bishopairport.org

Maps
- FAA airport diagram
- Interactive map of Bishop International Airport

Runways
Direction	Length		Surface
Direction	ft	m	Surface
18/36	7,849	2,392	Asphalt
09/27	7,201	2,195	Asphalt

Statistics (2025)
- Aircraft operations: 54,232
- Based aircraft: 98
- Total passengers served: 687,489
- Total enplanements: 344,893
- Total cargo: 27,144,097 lbs
- Source: Federal Aviation Administration, BTS

Bishop International Airport (IATA: FNT, ICAO: KFNT, FAA LID: FNT) is a commercial and general aviation airport in Flint, Michigan, United States. It is named after banker and General Motors board member Arthur Giles Bishop (April 12, 1851 – January 22, 1944), who donated 220 acres of his farmland for the airport in 1928. It is located in southwestern Flint, and is surrounded by Flint Township to the north, east and west; and Mundy Township to the south.

The third-busiest airport in Michigan after those of Detroit and Grand Rapids, it surpassed competitor MBS near Saginaw in terms of airline operations in 2002. 1,071,238 passengers used Bishop International Airport in 2007; 687,489 passengers used the airport in 2025.

It is included in the Federal Aviation Administration (FAA) National Plan of Integrated Airport Systems for 2021–2025, in which it is categorized as a non-hub primary commercial service facility.

The airport is currently served by three passenger airlines: Allegiant Air operates mainline service out of the airport, and regional services are provided by affiliates of United Express and American Eagle. The airlines offer passenger flights to 13 cities across the United States. The airport became a focus city for Allegiant on February 19, 2022. The airport also includes a freight terminal used by FedEx Express and an affiliate of FedEx Feeder.

Accompanying the airlines is fixed-base operator AvFlight, which handles both general aviation and airline operations. Also based at the airport are flight schools Greater Flint Pilots Association, American Wings Aviation, and Crosswinds Aviation.

== History ==
In 1928, the Arthur Giles Bishop family gave to the City of Flint 220 acres for aeronautical purposes. The city-operated Bishop Airport until 1987 when the city and Genesee County formed the Bishop International Airport Authority to run the airport.

The renovation and expansion of the current terminal, originally built in 1993, was designed by Reynolds, Smith & Hills.

=== Historic airline service ===
When the current terminal was completed in 1993, most airlines serving Flint were using propeller aircraft, which included Northwest Airlink (the regional service of Northwest Airlines) and Skyway Airlines (operating as Midwest Connect). USAir was the only airline providing jet service at the time, which they operated to their hub in Pittsburgh. Northwest Airlines, who operated a major hub nearby at Detroit Metropolitan Airport, would upgrade most of their flights from Detroit to Flint (and other Michigan cities) to DC 9 jets in 1996.

In 1997 ValuJet Airlines began service to Flint, which became Flint's first low-cost carrier. ValuJet was merged into AirTran Airways later that year, who continued to provide flights to Atlanta. The success of AirTran's flights led them to increase service which prompted Northwest Airlines to also increase service to Flint. For much of the 2000s, competition between AirTran and Northwest brought growth in air service to Flint which included flights to Florida and Las Vegas. Competition between the two airlines was so heavy, both airlines would often announce new competing services within days of each other.

In 2001 Delta Air Lines began flights to Flint starting with Delta Connection flights to their hub in Cincinnati which operated for a few years. Delta flights to their hub in Atlanta were added in 2003.

In 2002 ATA Connection (operated by Chicago Express Airlines) began flights from Flint to Chicago Midway Airport using Saab 340 turboprop aircraft. ATA Connection also briefly operated flights to Indianapolis before ATA Airlines shutdown ATA Connection in 2005. American Eagle subsequently started flights to Chicago O'Hare International Airport by the end of that year. American Eagle also had flights from Flint to Dallas/Fort Worth and LaGuardia Airport in New York in the late 2000s.

Northwest Airlines was merged into Delta Air Lines in 2008. After the merger, Delta continued to operate flights to Detroit and Minneapolis/St. Paul (both of which were previously operated by Northwest) in addition to their service to Atlanta. However, Delta discontinued the short flights to Detroit in 2013.

United Express added flights to Chicago O'Hare International Airport in 2014 after discontinuing flights to Cleveland (which had started years earlier by United's predecessor Continental Airlines).

AirTran was merged into Southwest Airlines in 2011. Southwest continued to serve Flint briefly following the merger and offered Boeing 737 flights from Flint to Las Vegas, Orlando, Tampa, Baltimore, and seasonal service to Fort Myers before dropping them and serving only Chicago Midway Airport in 2016. While flights to Midway were full, Southwest did not see adequate profit from the short flight and ceased service to Flint in 2018.

After Southwest's service downgrade in 2016, Allegiant Air saw the demand in Flint for low cost flights to popular tourist destinations and began service to Orlando/Sanford and Tampa/Clearwater – St. Petersburg in 2016. The success of those routes led to additional service to Punta Gorda, Florida, in 2018 and seasonal service to both Ft. Lauderdale and Myrtle Beach.

Although Allegiant was a welcome to passengers at Flint, the lack of daily flights that Southwest had offered plus the Delta Connection cancellation of their twice daily Minneapolis flight led Flint to their lowest passenger numbers in over a decade. Statistics from the airport for 2018 show the number of passengers boarding flights at Bishop down about 10%: from 400,781 in 2017 to 360,609 in 2018, the lowest number of departing flights from Flint since 2002. Allegiant Air added service between Flint and Nashville on June 5, 2020. On November 17, 2020, Allegiant announced it would begin service between Flint and Las Vegas, starting March 4, 2021. Allegiant has announced it will offer service to Boston and Jacksonville, Florida starting in March 2022. In February 2022, Flint became an operating base for Allegiant Air. Allegiant began service between Flint and Savannah, Georgia on April 15, 2022.

Despite the 2018 results, early 2019 saw Allegiant become the number-one air carrier in Flint, carrying 41% of Flint's passengers in February. Envoy Air (as American Eagle) also started a fourth daily flight to Chicago O'Hare. On April 11, 2019, PSA Airlines (as American Eagle) announced twice daily service to Charlotte to begin in September 2019. American's flights to Charlotte were discontinued in 2022.

Delta Air Lines indefinitely suspended their last remaining service from Flint to Atlanta due to the impact of the COVID-19 pandemic on aviation. Despite ending Flint service, Delta still serves nearby airports such as MBS International Airport near Saginaw and Detroit Metropolitan Airport in Romulus.

== Renovations ==
In early February 2007, Bishop International Airport unveiled a comprehensive five-year developmental plan that would be slated for continuation through late 2011. The program called for two phases of "Intermodal Facility Development," including the expansion of the West Cargo Apron, what is now known as the Abex and Emory GVA Freight Ramp, located on the airport's northwest side.

In May 2009, Bishop International Airport began Phase I of its Terminal Airside & Concourse Improvements program. Projects under this phase were developed in 2008. Included in this phase are upgrades to the terminal ramp, upon which the passenger concourse resides; the permanent closure and deconstruction of Runway 5/23; and the acquisition of new land for an envisioned Runway 09L/27R, which was scheduled to be designed in 2009 and constructed in 2010.

Runway 5/23 was closed permanently on May 4, 2009 as progress continued in the Capital Improvement Program.

The renovation and expansion of the terminal, originally built in 1993, was designed by Reynolds, Smith & Hills.

On April 24, 2012, the airport's board of directors approved a $1.348 million project to repair the airport's ramp. On September 19, 2012, it was announced that the Federal Aviation Administration approved a grant to fund the project.

On October 6, 2012, a new Transportation Security Administration checkpoint opened in the terminal.

The completed terminal was dedicated on November 13, 2012.

The airport's board allocated an additional $10.9 million for upgrades in 2013 and 2014.

On August 29, 2013, the airport received a $2.87 million grant from the U.S. Department of Transportation, which was used to repair taxiways and lighting and to buy a replacement snow truck.

On September 28, 2017, the airport received a $4.302 million grant from the Federal Aviation Administration which will be used to rehabilitate the pavement of Taxiway C, construct asphalt shoulders and install runway guard lights at each access point to the runway.

On July 30, 2018, the FAA gave the airport a $4,012,542 grant for taxiway construction, rehabilitation and lighting.

On June 5, 2019, the FAA gave the airport $8,056,505 for runway reconstruction, the addition of runway shoulders, and enhancements to the runway's lighting system.

On August 8, 2024, the airport received $2 million from the FAA for upgrades to the gate counters, ticket counters, information displays, and a new 6,000 feet (1,800 m) service road and taxilane on the field. Also on that date, Michigan Congressman Dan Kildee said he plans to seek another $4.5 million in the 2025 federal budget for undisclosed safety and accessibility improvements.

== Facilities ==
Bishop International Airport covers 1,550 acres (6 km²) and has two runways:

- Runway 18/36: 7,849 × 150 ft. (2,392 × 46 m), surface: asphalt/concrete
- Runway 09/27: 7,201 × 150 ft. (2,195 × 46 m), surface: asphalt

In the year ending December 31, 2021, the airport had 44,632 operations, an average of 122 aircraft operations per day: 78% general aviation, 21% scheduled commercial / air taxi, and less than 1% military. At that time 93 aircraft were based at this airport: 70 single-engine, 21 multi-engine, and two jet aircraft.

== Airlines and destinations ==
=== Passenger ===
Airlines	Destinations
Allegiant Air	Destin/Fort Walton Beach, Fort Myers (begins February 11, 2027), Las Vegas, Nashville, Orlando (begins February 10, 2027), Orlando/Sanford, Phoenix/Mesa, Punta Gorda (FL), St. Petersburg/Clearwater; Seasonal: Fort Lauderdale, Jacksonville (FL), Sarasota
American Eagle	Chicago–O'Hare
United Express	Chicago–O'Hare

Destinations map
Destinations from Bishop International Airport
Red = Year-round destination
Blue = Future destination
Green = Seasonal destination
Pink = Destination being terminated

=== Cargo ===
Airlines	Destinations
FedEx Express	Memphis, Indianapolis
FedEx Feeder	Alpena; Seasonal: Gaylord

== Statistics ==
=== Top destinations ===
Busiest domestic routes from FNT (September 2025 – August 2026)
Rank	City	Passengers	Carriers
1	Chicago–O'Hare, Illinois	77,550	American, United
2	Punta Gorda, Florida	54,570	Allegiant
3	Orlando/Sanford, Florida	50,710	Allegiant
4	St. Petersburg/Clearwater, Florida	44,000	Allegiant
5	Sarasota, Florida	27,820	Allegiant
6	Phoenix/Mesa, Arizona	17,490	Allegiant
7	Las Vegas, Nevada	17,000	Allegiant
8	Nashville, Tennessee	13,470	Allegiant
9	Jacksonville, Florida	12,930	Allegiant
10	Destin/Ft. Walton Beach, Florida	8,940	Allegiant

=== Carrier shares ===
Carrier shares (September 2025 – August 2026)
Carrier	Passengers (arriving and departing)
Allegiant	501,000(76.43%)
SkyWest	155,000(23.57%)

2020 was Bishop's worst year since 2002, with departures down about 42%: from 597,000 in 2019 to 346,000 in 2020. This was largely due to the COVID-19 pandemic.

== Ground transportation ==
Bishop International Airport is accessible from I-69, I-75/US-23, and I-475 at Bristol Road. The airport is also served by a bus line operated by the Flint Mass Transportation Authority, local taxi services, and Uber which operates in the Flint area. Several car rental agencies are also available at the airport.

== Airport Authority Board ==
The Bishop International Airport Authority (BIAA) is the joint public authority created by Genesee County and the city of Flint to run Bishop International Airport. The Authority Board has nine members appointed to three-year terms. BIAA operates the airport's public safety and maintenance departments.

On January 27, 2014, airport director Jim Rice retired after 24 years of service. The service drive in front of the airport that leads to the terminal and front parking lot has since been renamed in his honor. The board later named Craig Williams, former Fort Wayne-Allen County Airport Authority board member, as his successor on July 22, 2014.

== Accidents and incidents ==
- On May 18, 1935, a Ford Trimotor operated by Knowles Flying Service crash landed at Flint-Bishop Airport due to fuel starvation. Two passengers and a pilot died out of the 12 on board.
- On April 5, 1958, Capital Airlines Flight 67, a Vickers Viscount flying from Flint-Bishop to MBS International Airport near Saginaw, crashed on approach due to ice accumulation, killing all 47 people on board.
- On January 6, 1977, a Learjet 23 operated by Jet Avia crashed while on a runway 27 localizer back course approach in snow and a low ceiling. A failure to maintain airspeed was the probable cause. Both occupants were killed.
- On November 16, 2011, a Piaggio P.180 Avanti operating as Avantair Flight 168 (Detroit Metro to West Bend Municipal, tail number N168SL) crashed upon landing due to an engine failure. The plane was damaged beyond repair, but everyone aboard survived with only minor injuries.
- On December 12, 2011, four people from Saginaw were arrested at Bishop International Airport trying to smuggle 122 pounds (55 kg) of marijuana from Phoenix.
- On June 21, 2017, airport police lieutenant Jeff Neville was stabbed in the neck by a man who shouted "Allahu Akbar" while doing so. A Tunisian-born Canadian man, Amor Ftouhi, was arrested at the scene as a suspect. Neville survived the attack. The attack was condemned by the Canadian government. Ftouhi was found guilty of three federal counts in November 2018. He was sentenced to life in prison in April 2019.
- On January 18, 2019, it was reported that the Michigan Department of Environmental Quality had found elevated levels of PFAS in groundwater at the airport.

== Gallery ==
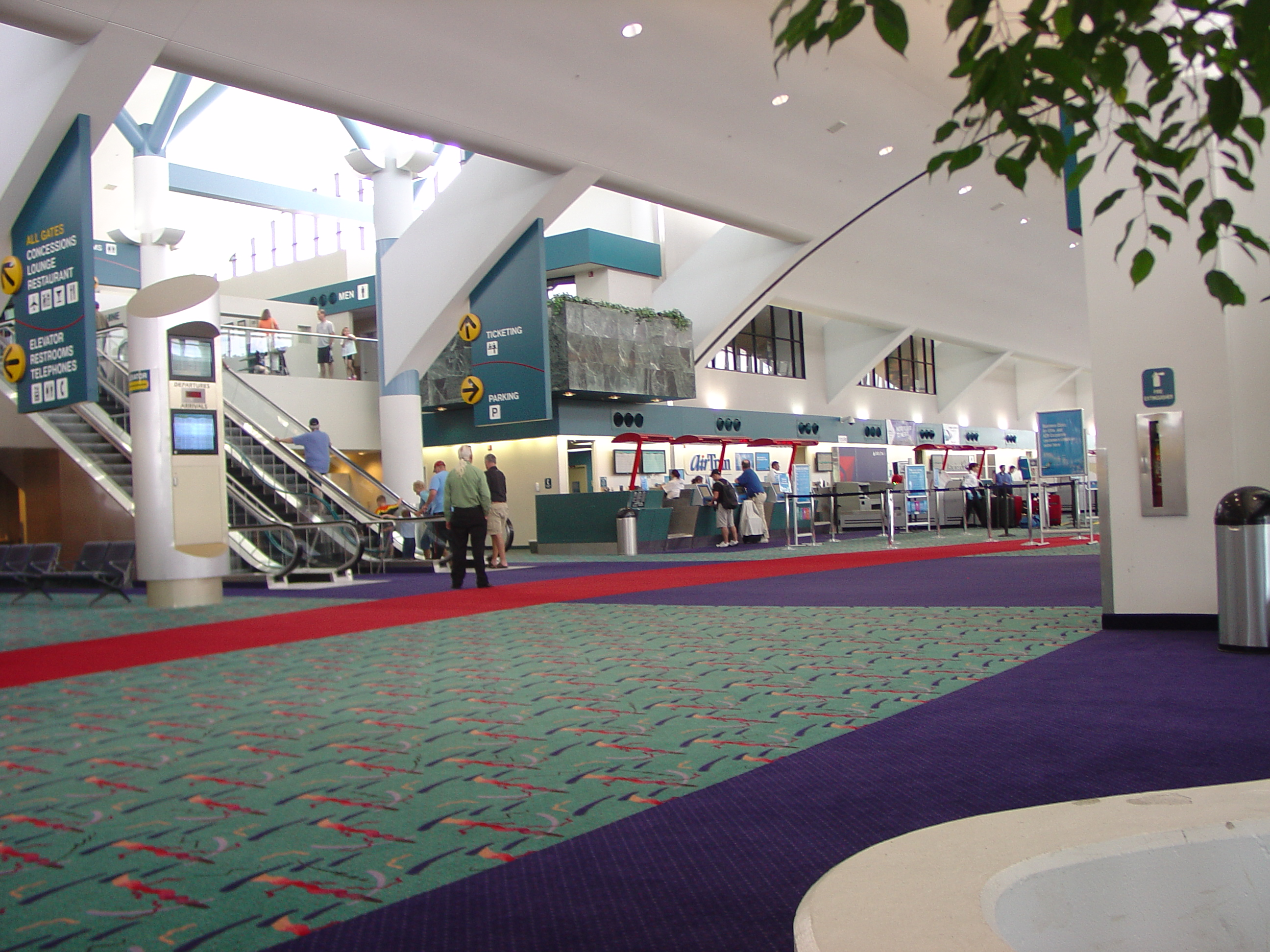
Ticketing area

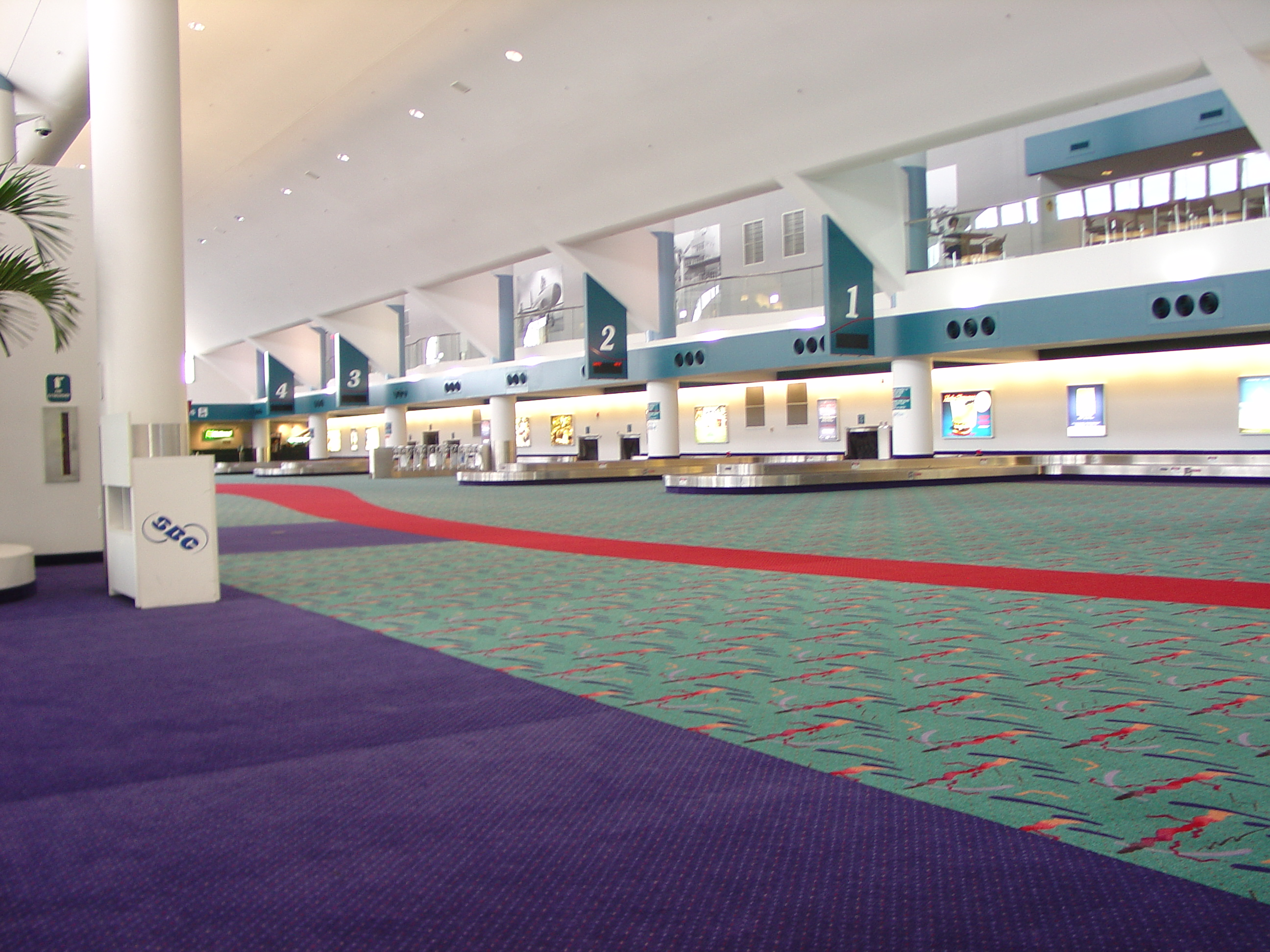
Baggage claim area

Artwork depicting a paper airplane in the terminal

== See also ==
- List of airports in Michigan
