= ATA Connection =

Regional airline of the United States (1993–2008)

IATA	ICAO	Call sign
C8	WDY	WINDY CITY
- Founded: August 1993
- Ceased operations: April 3, 2008
- Hubs: Chicago–Midway; Indianapolis
- Frequent-flyer program: ATA Travel Awards

ATA Connection was the brand name of ATA Airlines' commuter service operated by Chicago Express Airlines, which operates flights to smaller Midwestern cities.

== History ==
ATA Connection, as a branded regional feeder operation, ceased being used when the remaining assets of Chicago Express were completely divested from AMTRAN, INC.'s successor company early in 2006, and some months before that when the fleet was withdrawn from service, owned aircraft parked, and leased airplanes returned to their lease owners. Chicago Express, operating as the ATA Connection, flew British Aerospace Jetstream 31 turboprops which were then replaced with Saab 340 turboprops. C8 was the IATA airline code used when travel agencies were writing tickets upon Chicago Express routes, and booking travel between airlines not affiliated or owned by ATA Airlines.

When the remains of Chicago Express (C8) were liquidated, the company was sold as Chicago Express, just as it read on the company's original airline operating certificate. ATA Connection's imagery and logos do not live on, unlike BMI Regional's logos and trademarks after the buyout of parent airline BMI.

=== Industry perceptions ===
The type of arrangement the C8 code and ATA Connection's form of logo and branding separating the two, has in the past at other companies, led to many public and corporate perception problems. Examples of such would be Ransome Airlines, who much of the informed among the aviation industry, was under the impression had completely exited the business of aviation, when its parent company had collapsed in bankruptcy. However, Ransome Airlines as Trans World Express continued to operate for years to come, unbeknownst to many.

Similarly, for many lay individuals, when one sees the Pan Am emblem and logo emblazoned upon railways and airplanes at airports in literally identical Pan Am Clipper Connection or Pan Am Railways form, this tends to leave the impression to all, that the original business is still in place. As in the case of Pan Am Systems also unbeknownst to many, no business connection to the original Pan American World Airways exists, although Pan Am's distinctive logo who Pan Am System owns, has been through four generations of different corporate usage.

C8 the IATA code of ATA Connection, C8 the certificated airline and former subsidiary of ATA Airlines parent company, and C8 the brand identified with ATA Connection are once and for all defunct. Amtran, and ATA Holdings continue to exist but in the renamed form of Global Aero Logistics.

ATA Airlines, a fully certificated airline carrier, IATA code TZ, ended operations in April 2008 as a result of the controlling interests of the MatlinPatterson hedge fund's reallocation of Amtran/ATA Holdings/ATA Airlines capital resources into the continued leveraged investments of DC-10 equipment, and World Airways / North American Airlines causing and resulting in the financial insolvency of ATA Airlines through these collateralized transactions.

(C8) The ATA Connection brand no longer exists.

== Other similar brands ==
- Allegheny Commuter
- Midway Connection

== See also ==
- List of defunct airlines of the United States
- ATA Connection operated by Chicago Express Airlines Inc.
