= J. George Mikelsons =

Latvian-American airline executive and pilot (1937–2024)

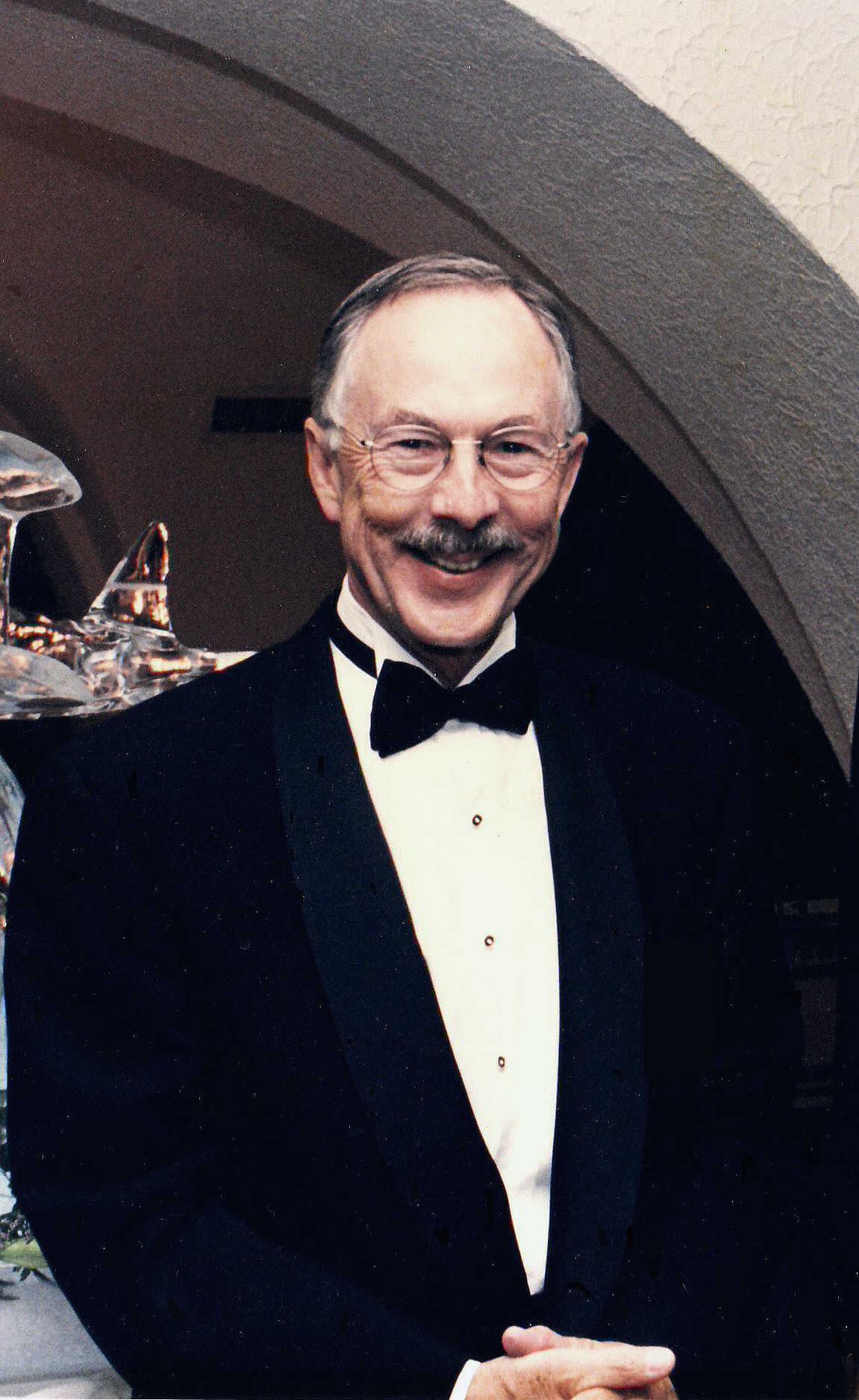
- Receiving the Tony Jannus Award in 1996
- Born: April 8, 1937; Riga, Latvia
- Died: May 1, 2024 (aged 87); Indianapolis, Indiana, U.S.
- Occupations: Founder, ATA Airlines
- Spouse: Muriel Mikelsons

Juris George Mikelsons (Latvian: Georgs Juris Miķelsons; April 8, 1937 – May 1, 2024) was a Latvian-American airline executive and pilot in the United States and the founder of ATA Airlines. He was born in Riga, Latvia, in 1938 on the eve of World War II. His family fled to Germany during the mid-1940s to escape the Soviet occupation of the Baltic states.

== Early years ==
As a child, Mikelsons would peer out of bomb shelters to catch any glimpse he could of the planes flying in the skies. This was the birth of his passion in life, which was to fly planes. His family moved to Indianapolis, Indiana, during the 1950s when his father was offered a job as a violinist for the Indianapolis Symphony Orchestra. His father Rudy, who introduced Muriel and George, was working for the St. Louis symphony. He followed years after his parents moved there

Mikelsons finally began pursuing his passion when he saw a sign offering flights for under $10. It was then that he flew for the first time. This flight sparked his desire to enter the aviation industry. He immediately began flying lessons and became the chief pilot and director of the Voyager 1000 air travel club.

== Founding of ATA Airlines ==
In 1973, Mikelsons started his travel club, Ambassadair, taking a loan and mortgaging his home to purchase a Boeing 720, which he named "Miss Indy". Ambassadair was a charter-based airline that provided cheap vacation fares. Mikelsons and an employee piloted the plane, loaded the luggage, cleaned the cabin, and served as the tour guide. His hard work and determination allowed him to purchase additional planes for his charter-based airline service. In 1984, after the deregulation of the airline industry, Mikelsons formed Amtran, Inc., as the parent company of American Trans Air (later renamed ATA Airlines) headquartered near Indianapolis International Airport. He also formed ATA Leisure Corp., Amber Travel, ATA Training Corp., ATA Cargo, and ExecuJet as subsidiaries as his business grew..

In 1993, ATA made its initial public offering, trading on the NASDAQ National Market System under the symbol AMTR. Mikelsons, a noted conservative always notorious for putting his money where his mouth was, purchased a 75% stake in the company. In 1998, Mikelsons retired, giving the reigns of the company to John Tague. Tague began a massive expansion with new aircraft and the establishment of a hub at Chicago's Midway airport. After the September 11 terrorist attacks in 2001, the slump in airline travel and rising fuel costs severely impacted ATA.

Mikelsons came out of retirement to save his troubled airline. ATA emerged from bankruptcy on February 28, 2006, after Mikelson had secured a major code-share agreement with Southwest Airlines. Upon emergence from bankruptcy, Mikelson retired from ATA and its airline holdings, turning the reins of the company over to a MatlinPatterson-led board of directors and former Southwest executive John G. Denison. ATA Airlines filed for bankruptcy protection again on April 2, 2008, and announced the discontinuation of all operations "following the loss of a key contract for our military charter business".

== Personal information ==
Mikelsons and his wife Muriel lived near Indianapolis and had two sons (Jay and David Mikelsons and a grandson, Beckham Juris Mikelsons). He was the 1996 recipient of the Tony Jannus Award for outstanding leadership in the commercial aviation industry. His wife was a concert violinist. They were active in a number of area charitable organizations, including the Indianapolis Children's Museum and the Indianapolis Symphony Orchestra.

Mikelsons died on May 1, 2024, at the age of 87.

== ATA Airlines chronology ==
American Trans Air Chronology
Company	History	Year
Ambassadair	American Trans Air's predecessor	1973
American Trans Air	American Trans Air becomes represented by the letters ATA among the traveling community	1973–2003
AMTRAN	Mikelsons forms Amtran as the parent company to American Trans Air as he seeks to expand into other ancillary aviation and travel related businesses.	1984
AMTRAN Holdings	American Trans Air officially changes its name to the more "user" friendly ATA Airlines and the parent organization evolves into AMTRAN Holdings.	2003
ATA Holdings	Amtran Holdings modifies its name to become the more transparent ATA Holdings in the hope of attracting investors attention. Its primary holding, ATA Airlines, emerges from the post 9/11 financial crisis after Mikelsons forges an alliance with Southwest Airlines.	2006
New ATA Holdings	ATA Airlines emerges from bankruptcy, Mikelsons leaves the company, and the MatlinPatterson investment firm enters the picture.	2006
Global Aero Logistics, Inc.	With the MatlinPatterson investment firms decision to acquire World Air Holdings, along with its recent capital infusion into the New ATA Holdings, ATA Airlines parent company, name changes yet again to Global Aero Logistics, Inc. ATA Airlines then assumes the role of Global Aero Logistics, Inc.'s primary holding among the overall corporate structure of its parent organization's family of airlines.	2007
Global Aero Logistics, Inc.	ATA Airlines and Global Aero Logistics, Inc.'s acquisition and merging of World Airways and North American Airlines, is formally approved by World Air Holding's; (a "none public" corporate entity – with over 75% of the outstanding shares controlled by the MatlinPatterson firms stockholders) on August 14, 2007.	2008
Global Aviation Holdings, Inc.	The new name of AMTRAN's successor becomes Global Aviation Holdings.	2009
