= Chicago Express Airlines =

Regional airline of the United States (1993–2005)

IATA	ICAO	Call sign
C8	WDY	WINDY CITY
- Founded: August 1993
- Ceased operations: March 28, 2005
- Hubs: Chicago–Midway; Indianapolis
- Frequent-flyer program: ATA Travel Awards
- Fleet size: 16
- Destinations: 17
- Parent company: ATA Holdings
- Headquarters: Chicago, Illinois, U.S.
- Key people: Edward Halley (CSC Investment Group CEO); Mike Brady (Chicago Express founder); J. George Mikelsons (ATA founder)
- Website: chicagoexpress.com

Chicago Express Airlines, Inc. was a regional airline headquartered in Chicago, Illinois, United States.

It operated regional feeder services from Chicago Midway Airport under the name ATA Connection. On June 1, 1999, ATA Airlines acquired Chicago Express for $1.9 million. Chicago Express became a wholly owned subsidiary of Amtran, later known as ATA Holdings, and now known as Global Aero Logistics, Inc. The airline had a line maintenance base at Midway Airport in Chicago, Illinois, and a hangar maintenance base at Gerald R. Ford International Airport in Grand Rapids, Michigan. In 2000, The hangar maintenance base was moved to South Bend Regional Airport in South Bend, Indiana. Chicago Express provided connecting service at ATA's hub, Chicago Midway International Airport. In 2004, ATA Airlines declared bankruptcy, and as a result, ATA terminated turboprop service (ATA Connection), and Chicago Express ceased all operations on March 28, 2005. It was purchased by CSC Investment Group based in Chicago, headed up by investment group CEO Edward Halley, on March 28, 2005.

== History ==
Logo of ATA Connection (2000–2001)

The airline was established in 1993 by Mike Brady of Express Airlines I in Atlanta, Georgia. The airline started operations in August 1993. Its route structure in many ways mimiced an unrelated defunct predecessor named Chicago Air which also operated from Chicago Midway's airport less than a decade before. On June 1, 1999, Chicago Express became a wholly owned subsidiary of Amtran, later known as ATA Holdings and now Global Aero Logistics, and operated as ATA Connection, a regional code sharing affiliate of the now defunct ATA Airlines (formerly known as American Trans Air). Chicago Express' principal base of operations was Chicago Midway International Airport, where the company maintained its headquarters. For several months before its liquidation, the company also operated a hub in Indianapolis, part of ATA's failed plan for intrastate flights throughout Indiana. However, following ATA Holdings' decision to codeshare flights with Southwest Airlines, a decision was made to terminate Chicago Express effective March 28, 2005, in favor of a strictly mainline operation. CSC Investment Group, Inc., headed by CEO Edward S. Halley, purchased the airline in 2005 for $3.2 million. Sold off purchased assets of (2) Saab 340B aircraft, Aircraft Spare Parts, Ground Handling and Office Equipment to Colgan Air. Relaunched Chicago Express Airlines as an international Cargo Airline.

== Destinations ==
Logo of ATA Connection (2001 - 2005)

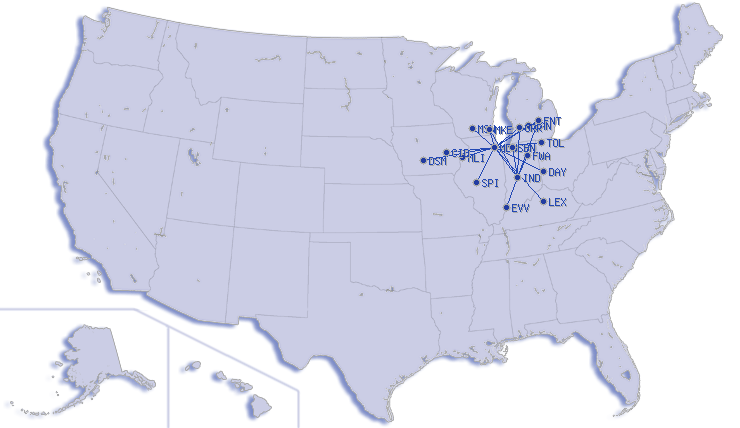
Route Map of Chicago Express (ATA Connection) before its demise on March 28, 2005

At the time of ATA's grounding of Chicago Express on March 28, 2005, Chicago Express/ATA Connection had operated scheduled service to 17 destinations throughout the Midwest:

=== United States ===
==== Illinois ====
- Chicago (Chicago Midway International Airport) Hub
- Moline (Quad City International Airport)
- Springfield (Abraham Lincoln Capital Airport)

==== Indiana ====
- Evansville (Evansville Regional Airport)
- Fort Wayne (Fort Wayne International Airport)
- Indianapolis (Indianapolis International Airport) Hub
- South Bend (South Bend Regional Airport)

==== Iowa ====
- Cedar Rapids (The Eastern Iowa Airport)
- Des Moines (Des Moines International Airport)

==== Kentucky ====
- Lexington (Blue Grass Airport)

==== Michigan ====
- Flint (Bishop International Airport)
- Grand Rapids (Gerald R. Ford International Airport)
- Lansing (Lansing Capital City Airport)

==== Ohio ====
- Dayton (Dayton International Airport)
- Toledo (Toledo Express Airport)

==== Wisconsin ====
- Madison (Dane County Regional Airport)
- Milwaukee (General Mitchell International Airport)

Prior to the airline's dissolution, it announced new service from Indianapolis to Gary/Chicago International Airport in Gary, Indiana, however it never began service on this route.

== Fleet ==
At the time of termination on March 28, 2005, the Chicago Express fleet consisted of 16 Saab 340B configured to carry 34 passengers on short-haul and commuter flights. All were former American Eagle aircraft.

=== Fleet history ===
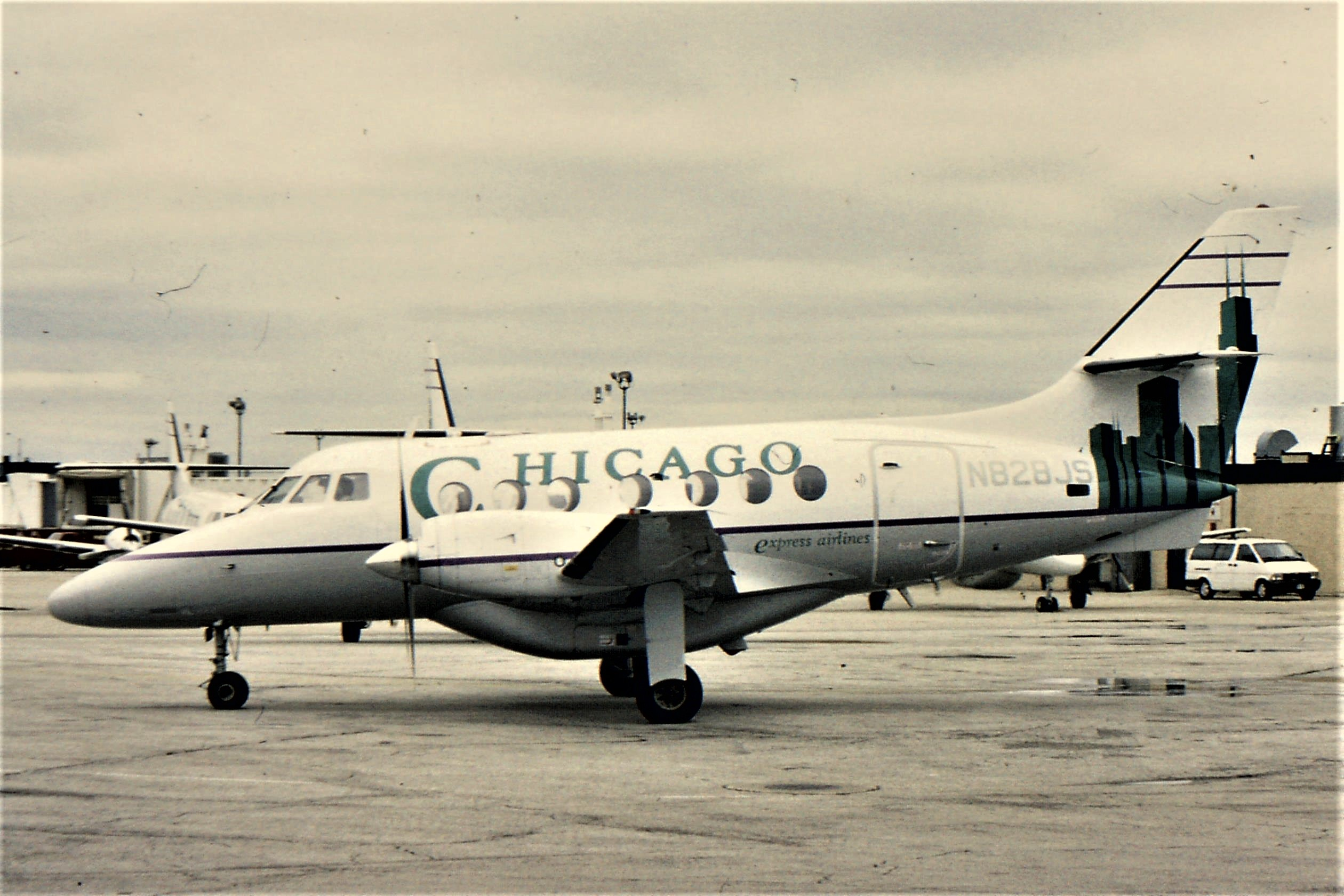
A BAe Jetstream of Chicago Express airlines at Midway International Airport in 1994.

Chicago Express received delivery of its first Saab 340B (registered as N194AE) on February 5, 2000. Having previously operated a fleet of BAe Jetstream 31 aircraft, at the time Chicago Express ceased operations its fleet consisted of 17 Saab 340B aircraft, all of which were former American Eagle aircraft. The 17 Saab 340Bs replaced the BAe Jetstream 31s, which were used prior to ATA's acquisition of the airline in 1999.

The Jetstream 31s were divided into two groups based on design features: 6 Jetstreams were equipped with Garrett turboprops with Automatic Power Reserve (which came from JetStream International, a USAir commuter. These were the ones with tail numbers N8xxJS), and the remaining 4 Jetstreams were equipped with Garrett turboprops with water-methanol injection. After Amtran's acquisition of Chicago Express in 1999, the Jetstreams were "retired" and most found homes with other (mostly corporate) operators. One aircraft was written off during an engine run-up immediately prior to its resale to another operator when one propeller struck a ground power unit.

Two Saab 340Bs (N309CE and N311CE) were owned by Amtran, and remained in Indianapolis for several months after Chicago Express ceased operations. The remainder were quickly leased by Colgan Air.

== See also ==
- List of defunct airlines of the United States
