= ATA Airlines =

Airline of the United States (1973–2008)

IATA	ICAO	Call sign
TZ	AMT	AMTRAN
- Founded: September 1973 incorporated in Indiana
- Commenced operations: March 1981 first airline operation
- Ceased operations: April 3, 2008
- Hubs: Indianapolis
- Focus cities: Chicago–Midway; Honolulu; Oakland
- Frequent-flyer program: ATA Travel Awards
- Subsidiaries: ATA Connection (1993–2008); Chicago Express Airlines (1993–2005)
- Parent company: Global Aviation Holdings (2002–2008)
- Headquarters: Indianapolis, Indiana, U.S.
- Founder: J. George Mikelsons

ATA Airlines, Inc., formerly known as American Trans Air and commonly referred to as ATA, was an American low-cost and charter airline based in Indianapolis, Indiana. ATA operated scheduled passenger flights throughout the U.S. mainland and Hawaii, Puerto Rico, and Portugal as well as military and commercial charter flights around the world.

American Trans Air was founded by J. George Mikelsons in 1973 as a profit-making corporation providing the employees and aircraft for Ambassadair, a simultaneously established non-profit air travel club. Air travel clubs were a form of low-cost air transport that avoided regulation by the Civil Aeronautics Board (CAB), a now-defunct Federal agency that, at the time, provided tight economic regulation of almost all US air transport. Ambassadair partially backfilled for Voyager 1000, a large Indianapolis air travel club that operated from 1965 to 1973 and had been shut by the CAB for effectively being an airline; Mikelsons had been chief pilot. Ambassadair's first flight was December 1973. In March 1981, American Trans Air become a charter airline in its own right, with Ambassadair simultaneously returning its air travel club operating authority to the Federal Aviation Administration. Ambassadair was a separately-certificated entity from American Trans Air.

In its early days, the airline flew charters on a worldwide basis and had bases in Chicago, Detroit, New York, Indianapolis, Oakland, and Milwaukee. Later, when it entered scheduled service, the airline maintained focus cities at Chicago Midway International Airport, Honolulu International Airport, and Oakland International Airport.

The airline's parent company – New ATA Holdings, Inc. (the successor to ATA Holdings Inc., which was originally known as Amtran) – later changed its name to Global Aero Logistics, Inc. and purchased World Air Holdings, Inc. for $315 million in an all-cash transaction with the financial backing of the investment firm MatlinPatterson. World Air Holdings, Inc. owned and operated North American Airlines and World Airways as two separate US-certified air carriers. ATA was North America's largest charter airline, and until its shutdown, it transported more troops for the United States military than any other commercial airline.

On April 2, 2008, ATA filed for Chapter 11 bankruptcy protection. ATA then announced it was ceasing all services, effective 4:00 am EDT on Thursday, April 3, 2008, citing the unexpected loss of a major contract for its military charter business, as a subcontractor of FedEx Express, along with recent increases in jet fuel prices. Red-eye flights in the air at the time of the announcement proceeded to their destinations. Flight 4586 from Honolulu to Phoenix was the last ATA flight, departing almost two hours late at 12:10 am (HST) arriving April 3, 2008, at 8:48 am (MST).

Southwest Airlines owns and retains the operating certificate and all assets previously held by ATA Airlines including trademarks, logos, etc. These were purchased for $7.5 million by Southwest while ATA was operating under bankruptcy protection.

== History ==
=== Voyager 1000 ===
Voyager 1000 Boeing 720 Salzburg September 1973

Voyager 1000 (ICAO: VOY, call sign: VOYAGER) was an Indianapolis air travel club, a non-profit corporation founded in October 1964 to reduce air travel costs for members. Voyager operated its first flight on February 11, 1965 to the Bahamas with its own Douglas DC-7. Until 1968, the club had only a few thousand memberships, but in that year it started to grow aggressively, reaching 17,000 memberships by 1972, each generally representing a family so total eligible travelers were far greater. Voyager advertised widely, noting flights were members only and offered cheap memberships for groups like students. Voyager had a Boeing 720, two Lockheed L-188 Electras, two DC-7s and two Martin 404s, and its own terminal at Indianapolis Airport. In 1971, Voyager offered high-season flights to Europe for $219 roundtrip (about $1,800 in 2026 terms), significantly below lowest scheduled airline promotional fares of $358. In November 1971, the CAB's Bureau of Enforcement accused Voyager of running an airline. In March 1973, the full board of the CAB agreed, a ruling confirmed by a Federal appeals court, with Voyager entering receivership in November 1973.

=== Ambassadair ===
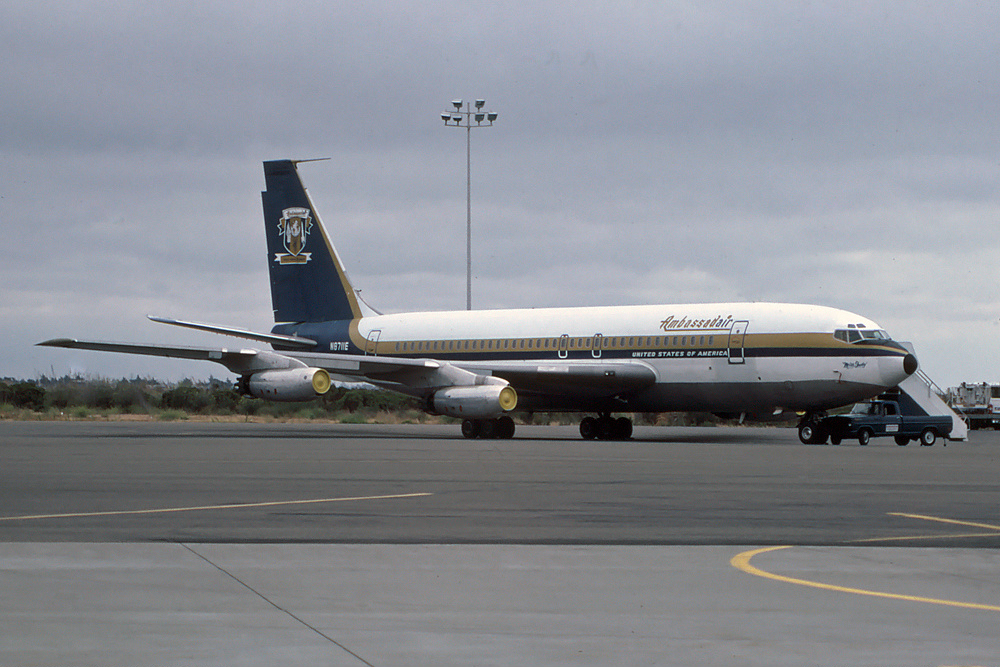
Ambassadair Boeing 720 July 1980

Pilot George Mikelsons had joined Voyager 1000 in November 1965 and rose to become chief pilot. In August 1973, he resigned to form his own air travel club. He incorporated the non-profit air travel club Ambassadair (ICAO: AMS) on September 5. On September 24, he incorporated American Trans Air (ATA), a profit-making corporation that operated the club, including controlling the aircraft leased to it. Mikelsons aimed to differentiate Ambassadair from Voyager 1000 by keeping membership small and upgrading onboard service. The first operation was late December 1973 with a flight to Orlando on a Boeing 720. Ambassadair remained a single-aircraft operation until December 1978, when it added a second 720, and then in March 1980 added a Boeing 707-100. In January 1981, the CAB approved ATA for its own airline certificate (economic authority). In March 1981, Ambassadair turned in its operating certificate coincident with the Federal Aviation Administration approving ATA's operating certificate.

=== Early years ===
707 Chicago 1984

Logo of ATA Connection (2000–2001)

Operations started as a charter carrier in 1981, with a fleet of eight Boeing 707s based in Indianapolis. In 1983, American Trans Air introduced its first McDonnell Douglas DC-10, a series -10, followed in 1984 by a long range series -40. Amtran, Inc., was founded by Mikelsons in 1984 as the holding company for Ambassadair, ATA, and any future subsidiaries. The airline replaced the 707s with Boeing 727-100 trijets in 1984, and added Rolls-Royce powered Lockheed L-1011 TriStar wide body jetliners (most of which were ex-Delta Air Lines and TWA) in 1985, and Boeing 757-200s in 1989. ATA was an all charter airline flying to destinations all over the world. American Trans Air started its first scheduled service in 1986 between Indianapolis (Indianapolis International Airport), and Fort Myers, Florida (Southwest Florida International Airport).

=== Expansion ===
In 1990, ATA began scheduled nonstop service using Boeing 757-200 aircraft from New York JFK Airport to Belfast, Northern Ireland, in the United Kingdom with continuing direct one stop service to Riga, Latvia. The founder of ATA is of Latvian ancestry. The Latvia service was unprofitable and was discontinued after a few years.

ATA performed services for the United States Department of Defense and US military during the 1991 Gulf War, transporting 108,000 military personnel on 494 missions for Operation Desert Storm and again during Iraqi Freedom and Enduring Freedom with the activation of the Civil Reserve Air Fleet ("CRAF"). During these periodic activations, ATA flight crews often and routinely spent as many as 19 hours aboard ATA aircraft in support of U.S. troops and the overall national defense missions. ATA's L-1011 aircraft were also chartered by the Department of Defense to fly personnel and their families between Philadelphia International Airport and Lajes Field, Naval Air Station Sigonella, Aviano Air Base and Incirlik Air Base (called "Freedom Flights" by personnel returning to the U.S. from these overseas installations).

In February 1991, ATA won a contract for daily 727-100 shuttle operations between Nellis Air Force Base and Tonopah Test Range in Nevada. This particular contract, formerly operated by defunct Key Airlines, was awarded to ATA and ended in late 1992 when Tonopah F-117 Stealth Fighter operations ceased. The 727-100s were replaced with Boeing 727-200s in 1993. Also in 1993, according to the Official Airline Guide (OAG), ATA was operating scheduled passenger service between New York JFK Airport and Lagos, Nigeria, via a stop at Santa Maria Island in the Azores with a Lockheed L-1011 TriStar wide body jetliner.

By the mid-1990s, ATA began focusing on increasing its domestic scheduled services including Hawaii as well as international routes to Mexico and the Caribbean (based on leisure travel) and began using the slogan, "On ATA, You're on Vacation". The airline began operating a sizable hub at Chicago Midway International Airport and offered scheduled services throughout the continental United States, as well as flights to Hawaii, Mexico and the Caribbean, all while continuing extensive military and government contract air charter flights.

ATA also began a twice weekly charter service from Orlando to both London Gatwick Airport and Manchester in the UK. All these services operated via Gander in eastern Canada where the aircraft would refuel. Most seats were reserved by UK tour operator Travel City Direct, who specialized in Florida fly-drive vacations. Travel City boasted higher luggage allowances, complimentary meals and snacks plus leather seats. Remaining seats were often filled by American military staff.

Services to the UK ceased in 2002 when Travel City switched to another airline, Air Atlanta Europe.

In 2000, ATA placed a large order for 39 new Boeing 737-800 aircraft and 12 Boeing 757-300 aircraft to expand its fleet for additional flights from Midway. That year, the airline also began scheduled flights to Mexico and was designated as a major carrier by the United States Department of Transportation.

In June 2001, ATA received the delivery of their first new aircraft, Boeing 737-800 registered as "N301TZ". In August of that same year, the airline received the delivery of another new type of aircraft, the Boeing 757-300, for which ATA was the North American Launch customer. ATA's first 757-300 was registered "N550TZ" and the airline also introduced a new logo on these new airplanes, replacing ATA as a "vacation airline" and putting more emphasis on ATA as a "business airline."

After 2001 the 737-800 with their ETOPS capabilities became the fleet's mainstay of ATA's medium haul operations from the west coast to and from Hawaii and Mexico.

==== Chicago Express / ATA Connection ====
In 2000, ATA and Chicago Express Airlines launched ATA Connection, a regional affiliate of ATA Airlines that would link regional mid-western cities with ATA's Chicago hub and Indianapolis focus city. Chicago Express was purchased for $1.9 million on June 1, 1999, and operated as a separate subsidiary. After ATA entered bankruptcy in late 2004, a decision was made to end ATA's regional airline service and terminate Chicago Express/ATA Connection, resulting in the permanent layoff of its entire staff. Chicago Express' assets were auctioned off and it ceased all operations on March 28, 2005.

==== American Trans Air ====
The similarity of the American Trans Air and AirTran Airways names to those of other airlines caused confusion among customers and the general public. The airline had been known informally as ATA from early in its history, and from the mid-1990s on had been advertised as such, so in 2002 the name of the holding company was changed to ATA Holdings Corp. In 2003, the name of the airline itself was changed to ATA Airlines. In 2007, ATA Holdings changed names again; this time to Global Aero Logistics, Inc., immediately after the acquisition of World Air Holdings.

=== First bankruptcy ===
After the economic upheaval caused by the 9/11 attacks upon the airline industry of the United States, ATA and its then parent company AMTRAN suffered substantial financial hardships. Among the small group of airlines to receive ATSB backing from the US Government, this alone proved not enough for American Trans Air to remain out of reorganization caused from the hardships and ill-timing of the refleeting to 737-800s just prior to the terrorism attacks.

On October 26, 2004, ATA Holdings and its subsidiaries filed for Chapter 11 bankruptcy protection. Eventually, shareholders of ATA Holdings stock lost all their money and received no shares. The stock, previously traded on the Nasdaq stock exchange as "ATAH", was delisted.

In 2004, AirTran Airways agreed to pay $90 million for ATA's 14 gates at Chicago-Midway. Southwest made a higher bid and the deal with AirTran fell apart.

In December 2004, ATA entered into an agreement with Southwest Airlines to transfer six gates at Chicago Midway International Airport and 27% of non-voting stock in exchange for a cash influx and a codeshare agreement.

In the beginning of 2005, the airline drastically reduced flights at its Indianapolis hub to only three destinations and centered scheduled flights at Chicago Midway International Airport in order to complement Southwest Airlines codeshare flights. ATA also focused on serving markets that were business oriented and did not have Southwest service, such as San Francisco, Dallas/Fort Worth, and New York–LaGuardia. Additionally, ATA began offering point-to-point service not connecting to its Midway Hub, as to benefit other Southwest Airlines focus cities, such as Las Vegas, Orlando, and Phoenix, with connections to non-Southwest destinations such as Denver and Hawaii. Southwest CEO Gary Kelly said that revenues were up nearly 20% due to the new codesharing agreement.

On March 28, 2005, ATA shut down its commuter airline service, ATA Connection operated by Chicago Express Airlines via a codeshare agreement, and later sold the assets to a private buyer. ATA Connection had initially operated British Aerospace Jetstream 31 turboprops which were then replaced with Saab 340B turboprops and was providing passenger feed for ATA at Chicago Midway Airport via a code sharing agreement. In attempt to reduce operating costs, the airline also downsized its fleet by returning twenty Boeing 737-800 and eight Boeing 757-300 aircraft, along with numerous Boeing 757-200 aircraft. The eight 757-300 airframes were subsequently refurbished by Boeing, the lessor, and then leased to Continental Airlines.

In mid-2005, ATA entered an agreement to lease three ex-United Airlines Boeing 737-300 aircraft. Three 737-300s entered service with ATA in late November 2005. Due to high lease rates, the three 737-300s were taken out of service in November 2007, and returned to their owners.

In September 2005, ATA outsourced all its Heavy Maintenance Checks to overseas and domestic contractors. Also planned was an agreement with Continental Airlines to trade ATA's remaining four 757-300 aircraft for four 737-700 aircraft. In early October 2005, ATA terminated these negotiations due to the Boeing machinists strike, which would have delayed the delivery of the aircraft.

On October 13, 2005, ATA announced major service reductions, ending flights to Boston, Minneapolis/St. Paul, and Newark. In addition, the planned addition of flights to Miami and Sarasota, Florida was canceled. This ended Southwest codeshare service to Minneapolis and Newark. Later that year, on November 1, 2005, a second round of flight cuts were announced, including the suspension of scheduled service to Denver, San Juan, and their headquarters and former hub, Indianapolis.

On November 17, 2005, ATA Airlines received court approval to sell its Ambassadair Travel Club division to Grueninger Cruises and Tours.

In a third round of cuts announced on December 6, 2005, ATA announced that it would discontinue service to three additional cities. ATA suspended flights from Chicago Midway International Airport to San Francisco, Orlando, and Fort Myers in late April 2006. Following these cancellations, ATA had only 18 daily scheduled departures from its former Chicago hub and 52 scheduled departures company-wide. Moreover, the company was left with only one gate at Midway, down from its previous total of 14, surrendering the balance to Southwest or the airport.

On December 15, 2005, ATA announced an expansion of its codeshare agreement with Southwest Airlines between Dallas/Fort Worth International Airport and cities in the Southwest system that connected via Chicago Midway International Airport.

In January 2006, MatlinPatterson and certain pre-bankruptcy creditors invested over $100 million in ATA and took the company private, also taking over ATA Holdings, Inc. Following the transaction, on February 28, 2006, ATA emerged from Chapter 11 bankruptcy protection. However, the airline was still shrinking. ATA continued to return more aircraft, including the 1,500th Boeing 737 Next Generation produced, N333TZ, which had been delivered new to ATA on May 14, 2004.

=== Final years ===
Following its first emergence from Chapter 11 protection ATA made several efforts to return to profitability, but due to the rising cost of fuel and negative pressures on ticket price ATA was unable to recover and ended operations on April 2, 2008. These late efforts included:

==== 2006 ====
- ATA commenced service between Houston's William P. Hobby Airport (HOU) and New York's LaGuardia Airport (LGA).
- ATA initiated new flights out of Oakland, California, Ontario, California and Hilo, Hawaii on April 28, 2006.
- In support of its codeshare agreement with Southwest Airlines, ATA moved its operations in the greater San Francisco area from San Francisco International Airport to Oakland International Airport.
- ATA introduced several new flights from the West Coast of the United States to and from Hawaii including the only nonstop service between Hilo and the mainland United States.
- ATA announced they would purchase nine of Northwest Airlines remaining DC-10-30s. These aircraft were to be used on military troop charters, replacing ATA's aging L1011-500 fleet. ATA planned to enter seven of the planes into service, mothballing the remainder for parts.

==== 2007 ====
- ATA Airlines announced that Subodh Karnik would become ATA's new president and chief executive officer (CEO) replacing John G. Denison, who continued as ATA's chairman of the board of directors.
- ATA for the first time in three years added several flights to and from its Chicago (MDW) hub.
- ATA's parent company, ATA Holdings, announced on April 5, 2007, that it would change its name to Global Aero Logistics, Inc., in a move that, according to then-CEO Subodh Karnik, "better reflects the company's diverse, worldwide operations". That same day, Global Aero Logistics, Inc. announced an agreement to acquire World Air Holdings, Inc. and its subsidiaries, World Airways and North American Airlines, for $315 million in cash. Each airline, as stated in the official announcement, was to keep operating independently. With the acquisition of World Airways, and the holding companies organizational name change to Global Aero Logistics, it was decided that three of the planned nine DC-10s acquired by ATA would be transferred directly to World Airways' operating certificate, resulting in employee layoffs at ATA.
- Starting in October 2007, ATA announced it would terminate service on several routes affecting Chicago Midway International Airport, Washington D.C. Reagan National Airport, LaGuardia Airport, and LA/Ontario International Airport. These service cuts left ATA operating to four destinations from its former Chicago hub.

==== 2008 ====
- In March 2008, Subodh Karnik resigned as CEO and former CEO and chairman of the board John G. Denison served as acting CEO until ATA's demise. No public reason was given for Karnik's departure, but the airline's financial problems coupled with the poor execution of the purchase of several DC-10s for use as military charters was rumored to have been a factor.

==== 2010 ====
- A federal jury for the U.S. District Court in Indianapolis ruled that FedEx must pay $66 million to the now-defunct ATA Airlines, saying the package delivery company broke a contract that ultimately pushed ATA into bankruptcy, with $22 million for lost profit in 2008 and $44 million for lost profit in 2009. However, in December 2011, a Federal appellate court in Chicago reversed the $66 million judgment against FedEx.

=== Second bankruptcy and demise ===
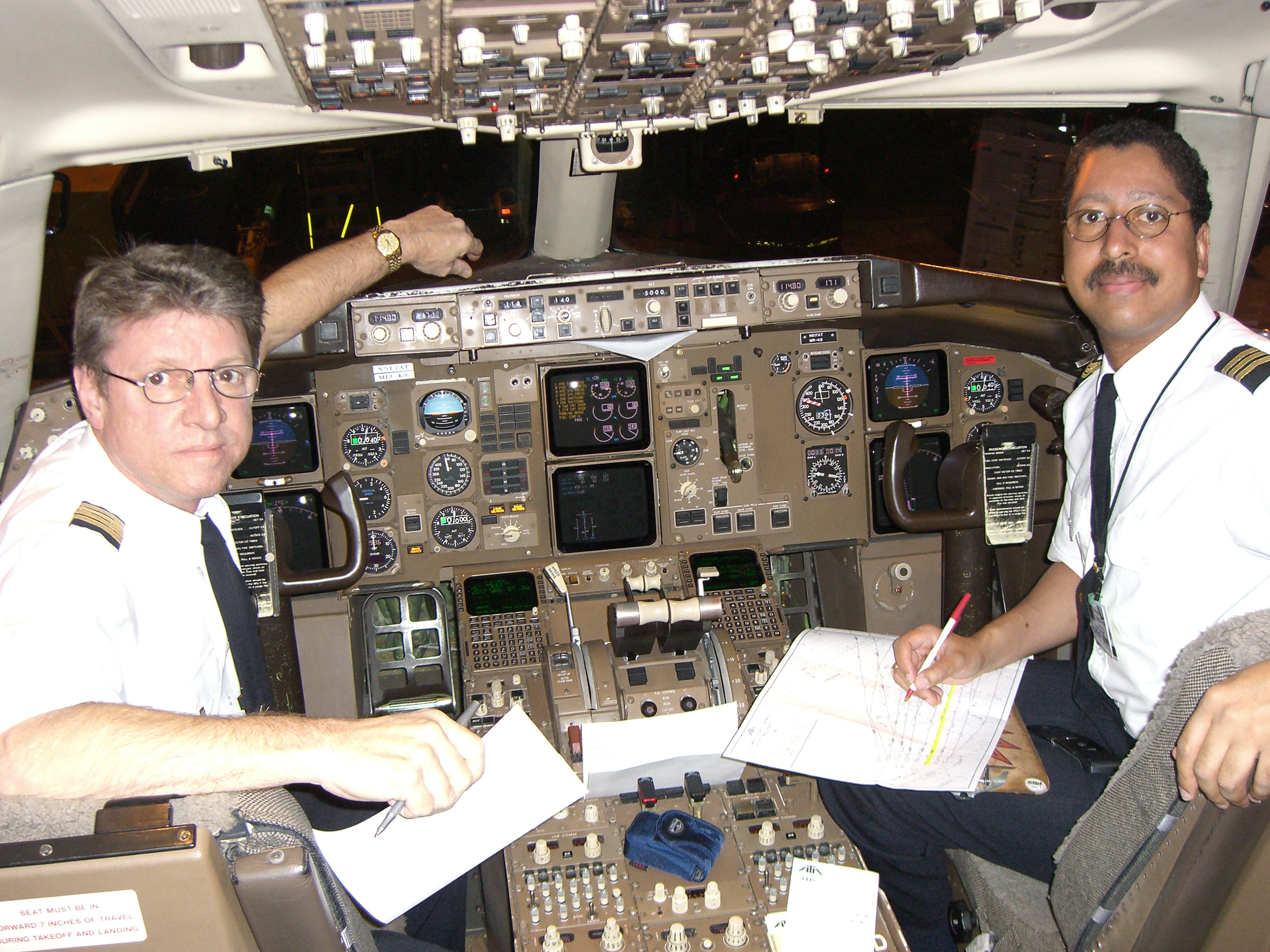
Flight crew of the last ATA Airlines revenue flight, AMT4586, after completing a segment from Honolulu to Phoenix. Captain Mark Groover and First Officer Philip Collier.

On April 2, 2008, ATA declared bankruptcy and ceased all operations. This sudden end came about after FedEx abruptly canceled ATA's longstanding military charter contract. Combined with a significant increase in the price of jet fuel, ATA did not have enough capital to stay in business. It was the third of four U.S. airlines to announce a complete shut down in the week of March 30, 2008, after Aloha Airlines did so on March 30, Minnesota-based charter Champion Air announced a voluntary liquidation on March 31 (effective May 31), and Skybus Airlines terminated service on April 5. The shutdown of ATA took effect at 4:00 am EDT, Thursday April 3, 2008, although some flights were airborne at the time and continued to their destinations, with the final arrival being ATA flight 4586 from Honolulu to Phoenix, which landed at 8:46 am, MST, or seven hours and 46 minutes after the announced shutdown. At the time of the shutdown ATA employed around 2,300 people, all of whom were subsequently permanently laid off. According to press reports, up to 10,000 passengers were affected and many of them had to scramble for help on several airlines. Most of them, however, had to pay for new tickets.

On November 19, 2008, Southwest Airlines announced its intent to acquire the remaining assets of ATA Airlines. The $7.5 million bid included the rights to 14 slots at LaGuardia Airport that belonged to ATA, as well as various other assets such as trademarks and logos. Southwest specifically stated their bid "doesn't include any aircraft, facilities or employees of ATA".

== Destinations ==
At the time of its shutdown, ATA Airlines served 13 destinations throughout Mexico and the United States. All routes were discontinued on April 2, 2008, due to ATA's bankruptcy filing, with the exception of some en route red-eye flights, which arrived on April 3. With ATA's additions of Kona and Lihue, Hawaii in June 2007, the airline was serving more Hawaiian destinations nonstop from the mainland United States than any other airline in the world at the time. Scheduled passenger service to a number of destinations listed below was discontinued prior to ATA's bankruptcy. At its peak, ATA served 35 destinations worldwide. Some destination information has been taken from ATA route maps from 1994 to 2003.

=== Africa ===
Nigeria

- Lagos – Murtala Muhammed International Airport – service ended prior to bankruptcy

=== Europe ===
Albania

- Tirana – Tirana International Airport Nënë Tereza - service ended for unknown reasons

Ireland

- Dublin – Dublin Airport – service ended prior to bankruptcy
- Shannon – Shannon Airport – service ended prior to bankruptcy

Latvia

- Riga – Riga International Airport – service ended prior to bankruptcy

United Kingdom

- Belfast – Belfast International Airport – service ended prior to bankruptcy

=== North America ===
Mexico

- Cancún – Cancún International Airport – service originally scheduled to end June 7, 2008
- Guadalajara – Guadalajara International Airport – service originally scheduled to end June 7, 2008
- Ixtapa – Ixtapa-Zihuatanejo International Airport – service ended prior to bankruptcy
- Puerto Vallarta – Licenciado Gustavo Díaz Ordaz International Airport – service ended prior to bankruptcy
- Léon – Bajío International Airport – 1999 shuttle service for GM Silao plant launch

United States

- Arizona
  - Phoenix – Phoenix Sky Harbor International Airport
- California
  - Los Angeles – Los Angeles International Airport
  - Oakland – Oakland International Airport (focus city)
  - Ontario – Ontario International Airport – service ended prior to bankruptcy
  - San Diego – San Diego International Airport
  - San Francisco – San Francisco International Airport
  - San Jose – San Jose International Airport
- Colorado
  - Denver – Denver International Airport – service ended prior to bankruptcy
- District of Columbia
  - Washington, D.C. – Ronald Reagan Washington National Airport
- Florida
  - Fort Lauderdale – Fort Lauderdale–Hollywood International Airport – service ended prior to bankruptcy
  - Fort Myers – Southwest Florida International Airport – service ended prior to bankruptcy
  - Miami – Miami International Airport
  - Orlando – Orlando International Airport
  - St. Petersburg – St. Pete–Clearwater International Airport – service ended prior to bankruptcy
  - Sarasota – Sarasota–Bradenton International Airport – service ended prior to bankruptcy
  - Tampa – Tampa International Airport – service ended prior to bankruptcy
  - West Palm Beach – Palm Beach International Airport – service ended prior to bankruptcy
- Hawaii
  - Hilo – Hilo International Airport
  - Honolulu – Daniel K. Inouye International Airport (focus city)
  - Kahului – Kahului Airport (focus city)
  - Kailua – Kona International Airport
  - Lihue – Lihu'e Airport
- Illinois
  - Chicago – Chicago Midway International Airport (hub) – service originally scheduled to end June 7, 2008
- Indiana
  - Indianapolis – Indianapolis International Airport (hub) – service ended prior to bankruptcy; ATA was also headquartered in Indianapolis
- Massachusetts
  - Boston – Logan International Airport – service ended prior to bankruptcy
- Minnesota
  - Minneapolis – Minneapolis–Saint Paul International Airport – service ended prior to bankruptcy
- Missouri
  - St. Louis – St. Louis Lambert International Airport – service ended prior to bankruptcy
- Nevada
  - Las Vegas – Harry Reid International Airport
- New Jersey
  - Newark – Newark Liberty International Airport – service ended prior to bankruptcy
- New York
  - New York City
    - John F. Kennedy International Airport – service ended prior to bankruptcy
    - LaGuardia Airport
- North Carolina
  - Charlotte – Charlotte Douglas International Airport – service ended prior to bankruptcy
- Oregon
  - Portland – Portland International Airport – service ended prior to bankruptcy
- Pennsylvania
  - Philadelphia – Philadelphia International Airport – service ended prior to bankruptcy
  - Pittsburgh – Pittsburgh International Airport – service ended prior to bankruptcy
- Texas
  - Dallas – Dallas Fort Worth International Airport – service originally scheduled to end April 14, 2008
  - Houston
    - George Bush Intercontinental Airport – service ended prior to bankruptcy
    - William P. Hobby Airport
- Utah
  - Salt Lake City – Salt Lake City International Airport – service ended prior to bankruptcy
- Washington
  - Seattle – Seattle–Tacoma International Airport
- Wisconsin
  - Milwaukee – Milwaukee Mitchell International Airport – service ended prior to bankruptcy

==== Caribbean ====
Aruba

- Oranjestad – Queen Beatrix International Airport – service ended prior to bankruptcy

the Bahamas

- Nassau – Lynden Pindling International Airport – service ended prior to bankruptcy

Cayman Islands

- Grand Cayman – Owen Roberts International Airport – service ended prior to bankruptcy

Dominican Republic

- Punta Cana, Dominican Republic – Punta Cana International Airport – service ended prior to bankruptcy

Jamaica

- Montego Bay – Sangster International Airport – service ended prior to bankruptcy

Puerto Rico

- San Juan – Luis Muñoz Marín International Airport – service ended prior to bankruptcy

U.S. Virgin Islands

- St. Croix – Henry E. Rohlsen Airport – service ended prior to bankruptcy
- St. Thomas – Cyril E. King Airport – service ended prior to bankruptcy

ATA also flew charter flights to London Gatwick Airport, London Stansted Airport and Manchester, UK via technical stops in Gander, Newfoundland and Labrador, Canada.

== ATA Connection destinations ==
Commuter air carrier Chicago Express Airlines operating as the ATA Connection served the following destinations with British Aerospace BAe Jetstream 31 and/or Saab 340B commuter turboprop aircraft from Chicago Midway Airport which was an ATA hub:

- Cedar Rapids, Iowa
- Chicago Midway Airport – hub
- Dayton, Ohio
- Des Moines, Iowa
- Evansville, Indiana
- Flint, Michigan
- Grand Rapids, Michigan
- Green Bay, Wisconsin
- Indianapolis, Indiana
- Lansing, Michigan
- Lexington, Kentucky
- Madison, Wisconsin
- Milwaukee, Wisconsin
- Moline, Illinois
- South Bend, Indiana
- Springfield, Illinois
- Toledo, Ohio
- Fort Wayne, Indiana
- Gary/Chicago International Airport – slated to open in 2005; however, the cessation of operations prevented this new service

=== USALatin Sky ===
On March 15, 2008, ATA was supposed to resume service to Miami International Airport and fly scheduled flights to Central America for the first time with the addition of flights to Guatemala City and San José, Costa Rica. USALatin Sky was to market the airline's flights to Central American destinations from Miami. As part of the deal, ATA Airlines would have based a single Boeing 737-800 aircraft in Miami to fly the routes to Guatemala City and San José. Due to a missed scheduled payment from USALatin Sky to ATA, the service was canceled prior to commencing, and no flights under USALatin Sky ever operated.

== Fleet ==
At the time of its shut down, ATA had 29 aircraft (3 owned, 26 leased) in its fleet. At its largest in October 2004, the company operated a fleet of 82 short, medium, and long-haul aircraft.

ATA Airlines fleet
Aircraft	Total	Passengers			Routes	Notes
Aircraft	Total	J	Y	Total	Routes	Notes
Boeing 737-800	12	12 —	148; 175	160; 175	Medium-long haul and charters	Fleet contained the 1500th Boeing 737 Next Generation.
Boeing 757-200	6	12 —	173; 200	185; 200	Long haul and charters
Boeing 757-300	4	—	247	247	Long haul and charters	North American launch customer Aircraft subsequently acquired by Continental Airlines and then United Airlines after Continental merged in 2012.
Lockheed L-1011-500 TriStar	3	0	283	283	Military charters
McDonnell Douglas DC-10-30	4	0	318	318	Military charters

As of August 2009, ATA's average fleet age was 13.5 years old.

ATA's Boeing customer number was 3N.

=== Fleet details at time of shutdown ===
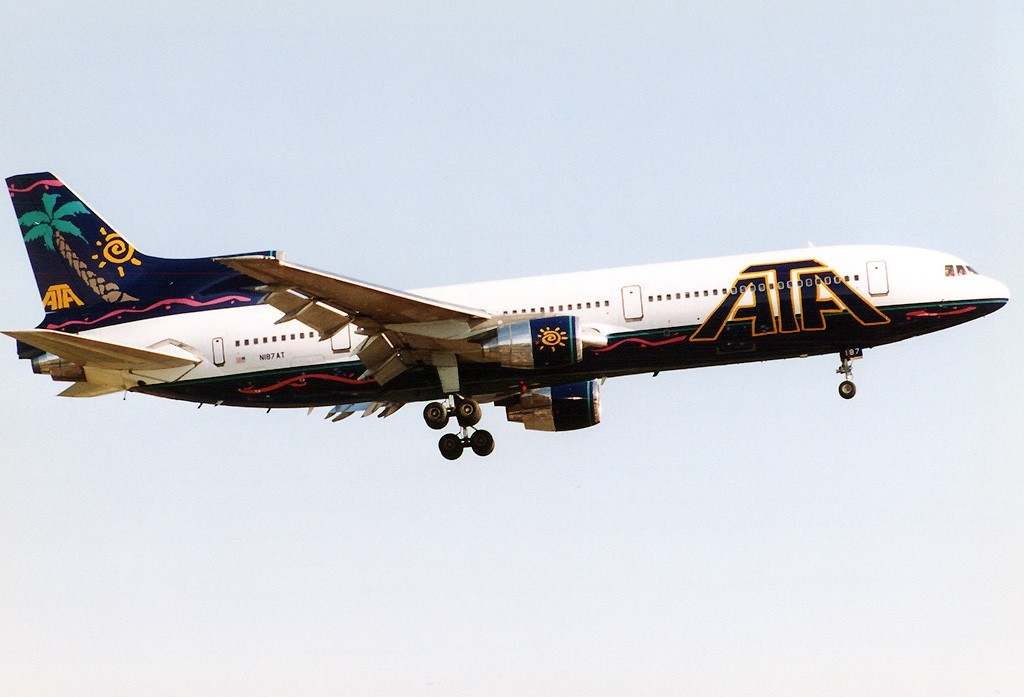
An ATA Lockheed L-1011-1

The aircraft registration and tail numbers of the ATA fleet include the following significant aircraft.

- ATA received delivery of their first 737-800 (N301TZ) on June 4, 2001.
- ATA received delivery of their first 757-200 (N757AT) on November 16, 1989.
- ATA received delivery of their first 757-300 (N550TZ) on August 4, 2001.
- ATA received delivery of their first L-1011-500 (N163AT) on July 28, 1998.
- ATA received delivery of their first DC-10-30 (N701TZ Freedom Bird) on December 29, 2006.
- ATA L-1011-100 (N194AT), crewed by FAs out of DFW, was the last ATA aircraft to feature a lower galley.

=== Previously retired fleet ===
ATA Airlines retired fleet
Aircraft	Year retired	Replacement	Notes
Boeing 737-300	2007	None
Saab 340B	2005	None	Operated as ATA Connection by Chicago Express Airlines via a code sharing agreement
BAe Jetstream 31	2001	None	Operated as ATA Connection by Chicago Express Airlines via a code sharing agreement
Boeing 727-200	2001	Boeing 737-800; Boeing 757-300
Lockheed L-1011-1	1998	Lockheed L-1011-500 Tristar	The L-1011 was used for service to Hawaii as well as on other domestic routes in the U.S.
Boeing 727-100	1993	Boeing 727-200; Boeing 757-200
McDonnell Douglas DC-10-40	1986	Lockheed L-1011-1	DC-10 written off after being destroyed by a ground fire at O'Hare International Airport in 1986
McDonnell Douglas DC-10-10	1986	Lockheed L-1011-1
Boeing 707	1984	Boeing 727-100
Boeing 720	1981	Boeing 707	Operated for Ambassadair

ATA ExecuJet, a Part 135 air taxi subsidiary of ATA Holdings, the parent company of ATA Airline, also retired the following aircraft in 2001:

- Bell 206L Long Ranger, owned by ATA's founder, J. George Mikelsons
- Cessna Citation II
- Grumman Gulfstream I
- Learjet 35

== Affinity programs ==
=== ATA Travel Awards ===
Launched in 2003, ATA's frequent flyer program, ATA Travel Awards, offered one of the lowest thresholds for earning travel, with the added benefit of allowing reward redemption free of blackout date restrictions. After three roundtrips booked on the company's website, customers earned a coach companion ticket on any flight operated by ATA Airlines throughout the contiguous United States. All tickets booked online received double credit toward that particular trip versus purchasing through a telephone or travel agent. While award availability to Hawaii was very limited, travelers did earn twice the normal number of credits when they purchased airfare on Hawaii-bound flights. With the shutdown of operations, ATA's frequent flyer programs were suspended and all earned points voided.

As a result of the recent enhancements in ATA's codeshare agreement with Southwest Airlines, those purchasing flights directly from ATA reservations and ata.com were given the option of earning points toward either ATA Travel Awards, or Southwest's Rapid Rewards. When ATA ceased operations, the relationship with Southwest Airlines was effectively terminated.

=== ATA Airlines FlightBank ===
Launched in 2006, ATA created a unique program called FlightBank, a rewards program for the frequent traveler between the U.S. mainland and the Hawaiian Islands. For a set "fee", the "bank" provided the traveler with a flexible number of flight credits that could be used over the course of a year, at vastly reduced savings and with no blackout dates for advance bookings. (The Flightbank program was preceded by the airpass program which was run informally by Pleasant Hawaiian Holidays from 2000 to 2006.) With the shutdown of operations, ATA's FlightBank program was also suspended.

== Service ==
Although ATA Airlines was marketed and advertised as a "low-cost carrier", it maintained many of the features which marked this airline as full service, at least by the standards American and European travelers have become accustomed to. Unlike many discount airline carriers in Europe, ATA offered complimentary features such as reclining airline seats on all of its airplanes, leather seats on most of its airplanes, adjustable head rest "wings" on many of its planes, limited AVOD audio visual on demand systems, complimentary assigned seating, complimentary checked luggage, complimentary soft drinks and non-alcoholic beverage, complimentary bookings via website reservations, complimentary inter-airline baggage connection transfers, and frequent flyer programs.

ATA sold snacks and snack packs under the label Skyway Café. Upon military and most charter flights, ATA provided fully complimentary airline meals or depending upon flight length, snacks. On some flights it provided in-flight entertainment such as documentaries, comedies, "classic television," music videos, and music. ATA aircraft included up to eight audio channels. Some flights over five hours included films.

== Codeshare agreements ==
At the time of its shutdown, ATA Airlines had a codeshare agreement with Southwest Airlines. As far back as 2001, ATA explored a passenger sharing agreement, with a now defunct airline called Access Air which also had midwestern United States flight operations. This agreement was short lived due to the tedious economic condition of this post deregulation "start up" carrier. The ATA Connection service flown by commuter air carrier Chicago Express Airlines was also operated on a codeshare basis.

ATA was not involved in an alliance.

=== Southwest Airlines ===
ATA Airlines, one of Southwest Airlines' main competitors in the Chicago market, historically operated out of Midway Airport alongside Southwest. After ATA declared bankruptcy in 2004, Southwest injected capital into ATA that (among other things) would have resulted in Southwest's 27.5% ownership stake in ATA upon their exit from Chapter 11 bankruptcy proceedings.

In a departure from its traditional "go it alone" strategy, Southwest entered into its first domestic codesharing arrangement with ATA, which enabled Southwest Airlines to serve ATA markets in Hawaii, Washington D.C., and New York City. Some years earlier, Southwest had a short-lived traditional codeshare arrangement with Icelandair at Baltimore/Washington International Airport.

In late 2005, ATA secured $100 million in committed financing from the firm of MatlinPatterson, and Southwest's original deal with ATA was modified such that Southwest no longer retained the 27.5% stake (or any other financial interest), in ATA. The codeshare arrangement was expanded, with some internal controversy, to include all of ATA's domestic destinations and more than 60 of Southwest's 63 destinations. In 2006, Southwest's pilot union approved a codeshare sideletter to their contract with limitations on the growth of this and other codeshare agreements. While these restrictions today are minor, outsourcing remains a growing concern in the unions' current contract negotiations.

In 2006, Southwest Airlines (Flight Code WN) began marketing ATA's two-letter TZ Coded Flights. ATA's dependence on the Southwest network continued to grow in 2006 to where ATA offered over 70 flights a week to Hawaii from Southwest's focus cities in PHX, LAS, LAX, and OAK. Additional connecting service was available to many other cities across the United States. Plans had been announced for ATA to offer exclusive international service for Southwest by 2010. In 2006, ATA announced its intention to purchase nine widebody DC-10 aircraft from Northwest Airlines. Southwest took over all ground operations for ATA at MDW, OAK, PHX, LAX, and LAS. These contracts provided that Southwest ramp personnel would now handle all ground operations for ATA (loading of aircraft, ground servicing, etc.). The details of these contracts were not made public, but represented Southwest's and ATA's growing codeshare relationship.

In February 2005, after J. George Mikelsons stepped down as CEO of ATA Airlines, John Denison, Southwest's former Chief Financial Officer took over. Effective January 1, 2007, Denison turned things over to Subodh Karnik, who became president and chief executive officer. Denison remained Chairman of Global Aero Logistics Inc., and was renamed as interim President and CEO when Subodh Karnik stepped down in March 2008.

== Livery ==
In ATA Airlines' 35-year history, the airline had three different mainline liveries and two special liveries.

=== Mainline liveries and logos ===
==== Final (flag) ====
ATA's last livery, known as the "Flag Livery", was introduced when the airline announced rapid expansion in 2001. It was primarily white with "ATA" painted on both sides of the aircraft. The company logo was also slanted upward on the aircraft tail resembling a flag. There was a gold stripe that spanned across the outward side of the engines and nacelles, and the winglets (on the 737-800s) were blue on the outside and unpainted on the inside. This livery was first introduced on ATA's new 737-800 and 757-300 aircraft and while it has been integrated onto some of ATA's 757-200s, it was never painted on any of ATA's 727s which were retired in late 2001.

==== Vacation / Holiday (palm tree) ====
At the time of ATA's demise, many 757-200s and some Lockheed L-1011s still carried the airline's previous livery. The "Palm Tree Livery", which was introduced in 1996, was also primarily white with "ATA" painted on both sides of the aircraft; the letters were painted in a "bubble-like" fashion. There was a palm tree and a sun on the tail, as well as "ATA" in small letters. The engine nacelles were painted blue, with the outboard side of each nacelle displaying a stylized sun. This livery, introduced to emphasize ATA as a "vacation airline", was synonymous with the phrase "On ATA, You're on Vacation".

==== Original (runway) ====
ATA's original livery, known as the "Runway Livery", was introduced when the airline began passenger service in 1981. Because ATA's first aircraft were ex-American Airlines aircraft, ATA's original livery was based on American's livery. The livery featured three stripes running the length of the aircraft in the following order: gold, white, and blue. The words "American Trans Air" followed by ATA's "runway logo" were painted above the gold stripe on the fuselage. The aircraft tail also featured gold, white, and blue stripes along the bottom with a bigger ATA runway logo in the center. All of ATA's Boeing 707s, and a majority of the airline's 727s, 757-200s, and Lockheed L-1011s wore this livery at some point. This livery was painted on every ATA aircraft until 1996, making this ATA's longest lasting livery at 15 years.

=== Special liveries ===
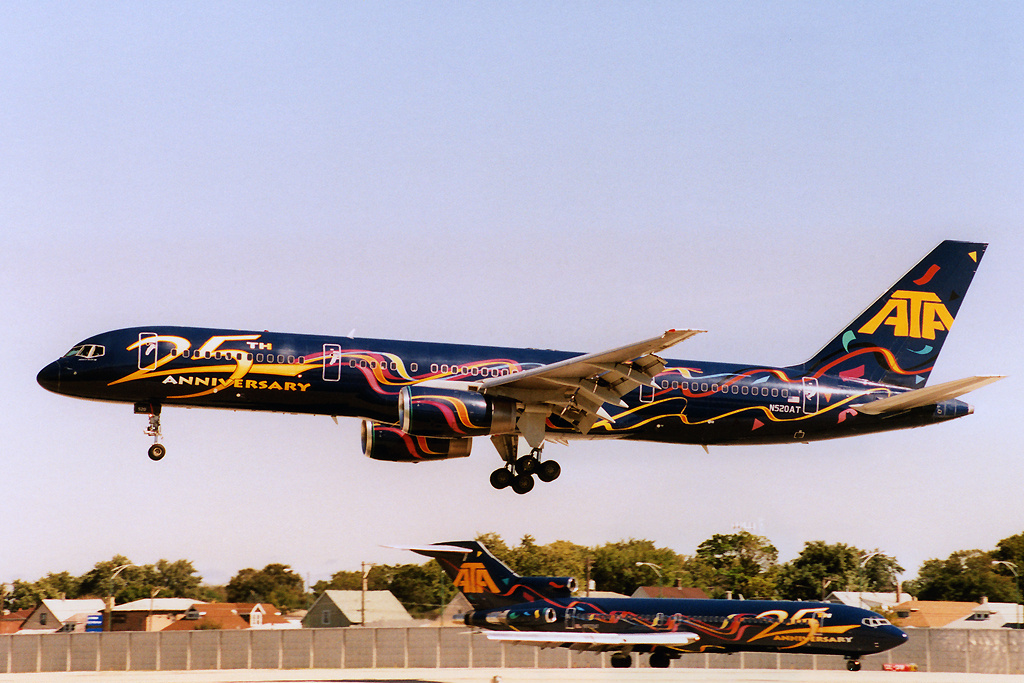
ATA Airlines Boeing 757-200 (N520AT) and Boeing 727-200 (N772AT) in the 25th anniversary livery at MDW

Throughout ATA Airlines' history, the company had two dedicated paint schemes. In addition to these, ATA's first Boeing 737-800 had the words "American Dream" inscribed alongside the nose of the aircraft; it was the only aircraft in ATA's fleet to have those words written on it. Other schemes were used to celebrate the company's 25th anniversary, as well as a marketing deal with Hawaiian tour operator, Pleasant Hawaiian Holidays.

==== 25th Anniversary ====
In 1998, ATA Airlines celebrated its 25th anniversary. The airline decided to commemorate the anniversary in a big way. In addition to a year-long celebration, two separate aircraft, N772AT (a Boeing 727-200) and N520AT (a Boeing 757-200), were given a special livery which was commonly referred to as the "25th Anniversary Scheme". The design featured the entire airplane painted blue with "25th Anniversary" painted in large gold writing near the front of the aircraft fuselage. The aircraft tail featured "ATA" in gold lettering with pieces of confetti scattered around the ATA logo. Red, orange, pink, and yellow streamers adorned the sides of the fuselage, as well as the engines.

==== Pleasant Hawaiian Holidays ====
In 1994, ATA partnered with tour operator Pleasant Hawaiian Holidays, which was the largest tour operator flying to Hawaii. To promote the alliance, several L-1011s were adorned in a "Hawaiian livery". The "Pleasant Hawaiian Holidays" livery has appeared only on two types of ATA's aircraft: the Lockheed L-1011, and later, the Boeing 757-300. The livery had two different forms; the more extravagant was painted on the Lockheed L-1011s. The livery was primarily white and featured "ATA" in big bubble letters near the front of the aircraft, and "Pleasant Hawaiian Holidays" spelled out after "ATA" near the top of the fuselage. Like the mainline livery, the engines were painted with a sun. The livery basically resembled the "Palm Tree Livery" that mainline aircraft adorned at the time. There was one big difference. "Hawaii" was spelled out in large letters horizontally across the aircraft tail. After the L-1011s were removed from scheduled service in 2002, two Boeing 757-300s were painted in the Pleasant Hawaiian Holidays livery; the elaborate TriStar livery was replaced with a toned-down livery. The new livery was ATA's current livery with the words "Pleasant Holidays" painted in small letters near the front of the fuselage. This livery and ATA's partnership with Pleasant Hawaiian Holidays was terminated in 2005 when Pleasant Hawaiian Holidays signed a larger network deal with United Airlines.

== Incidents and accidents ==
On May 12, 1996, a Boeing 727-290, N775AT, operated as American Trans Air flight 406, experienced a decompression at 33,000 feet. The flight, which was bound for St. Petersburg, Florida, made an emergency landing at the Indianapolis International Airport, Indianapolis, Indiana.

On August 10, 1986, an ATA DC-10-40 parked at the ramp at Chicago O'Hare International Airport was destroyed by fire due to a mishandled loose oxygen canister. There were no fatalities.

== Gallery ==
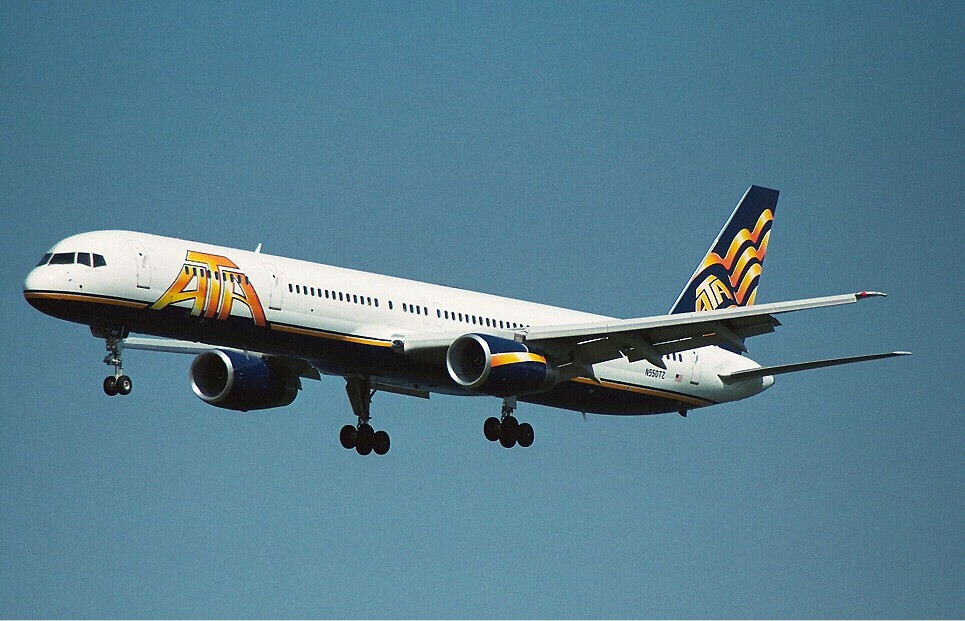
ATA Airlines Boeing 757-300 (N550TZ) at MCO

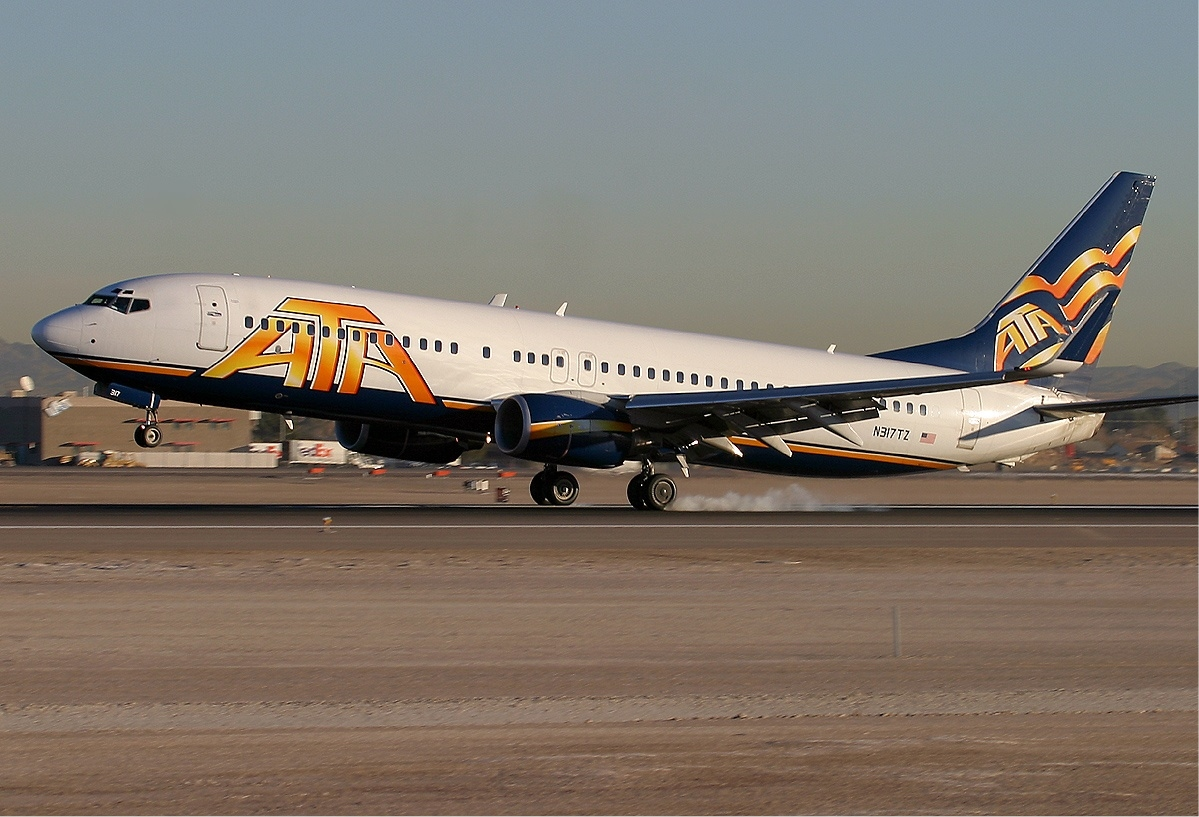
ATA Airlines Boeing 737-800 (N312TZ) at LAS

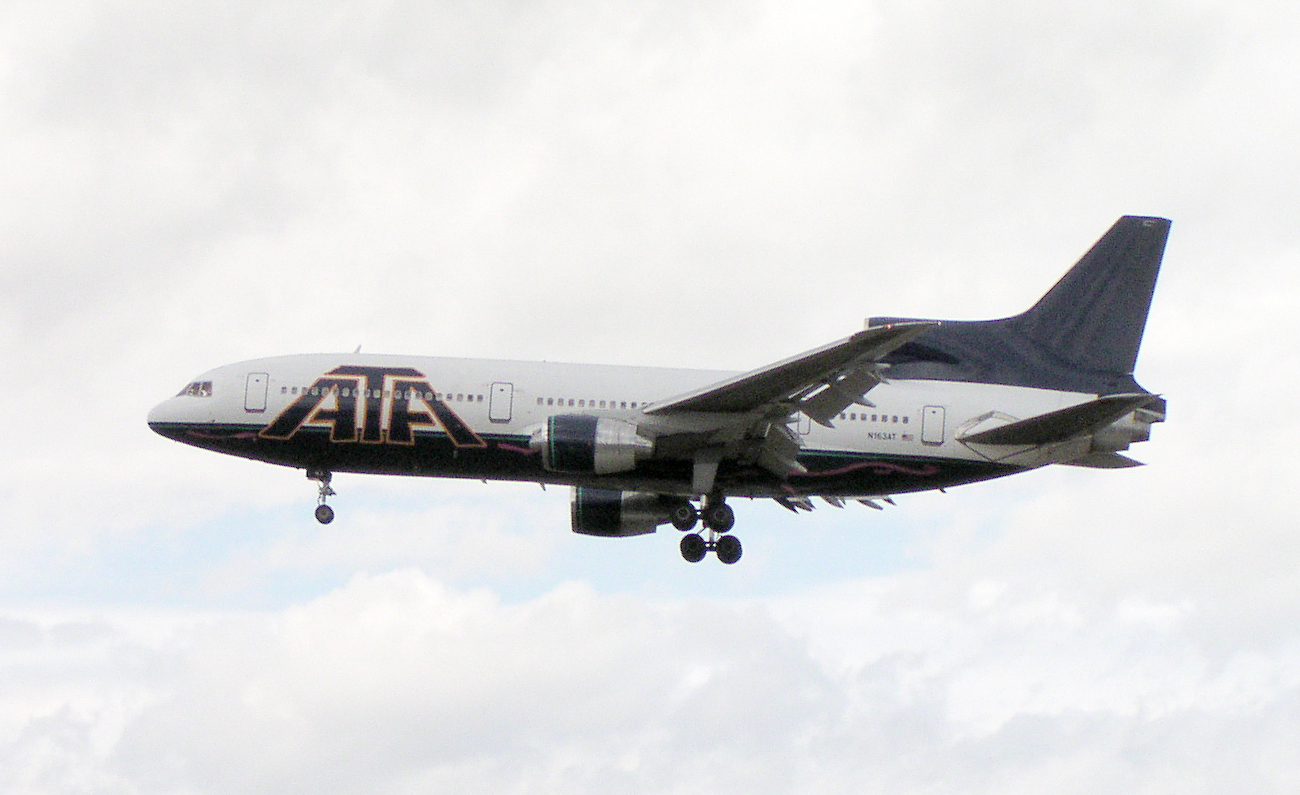
ATA Airlines Lockheed L-1011 (N163AT)

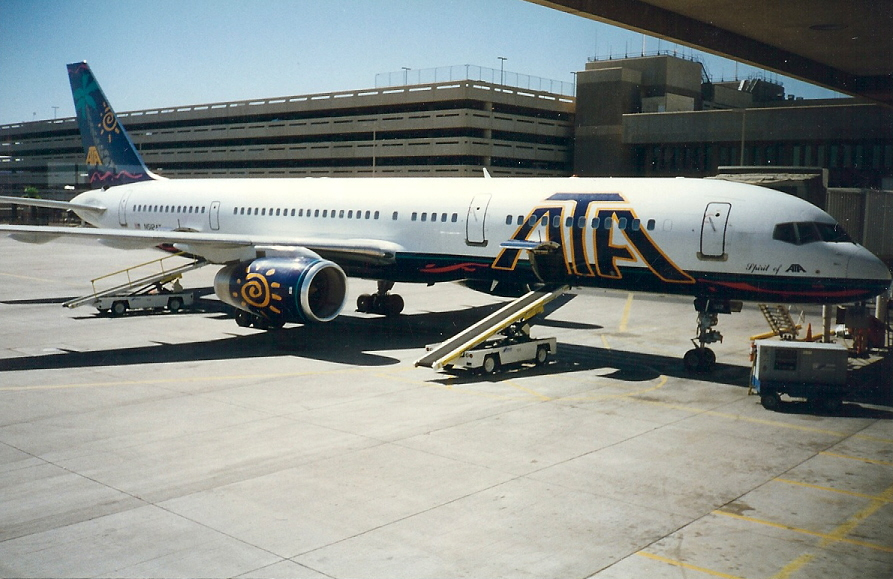
ATA Airlines Boeing 757-200 (N512AT) in PHX

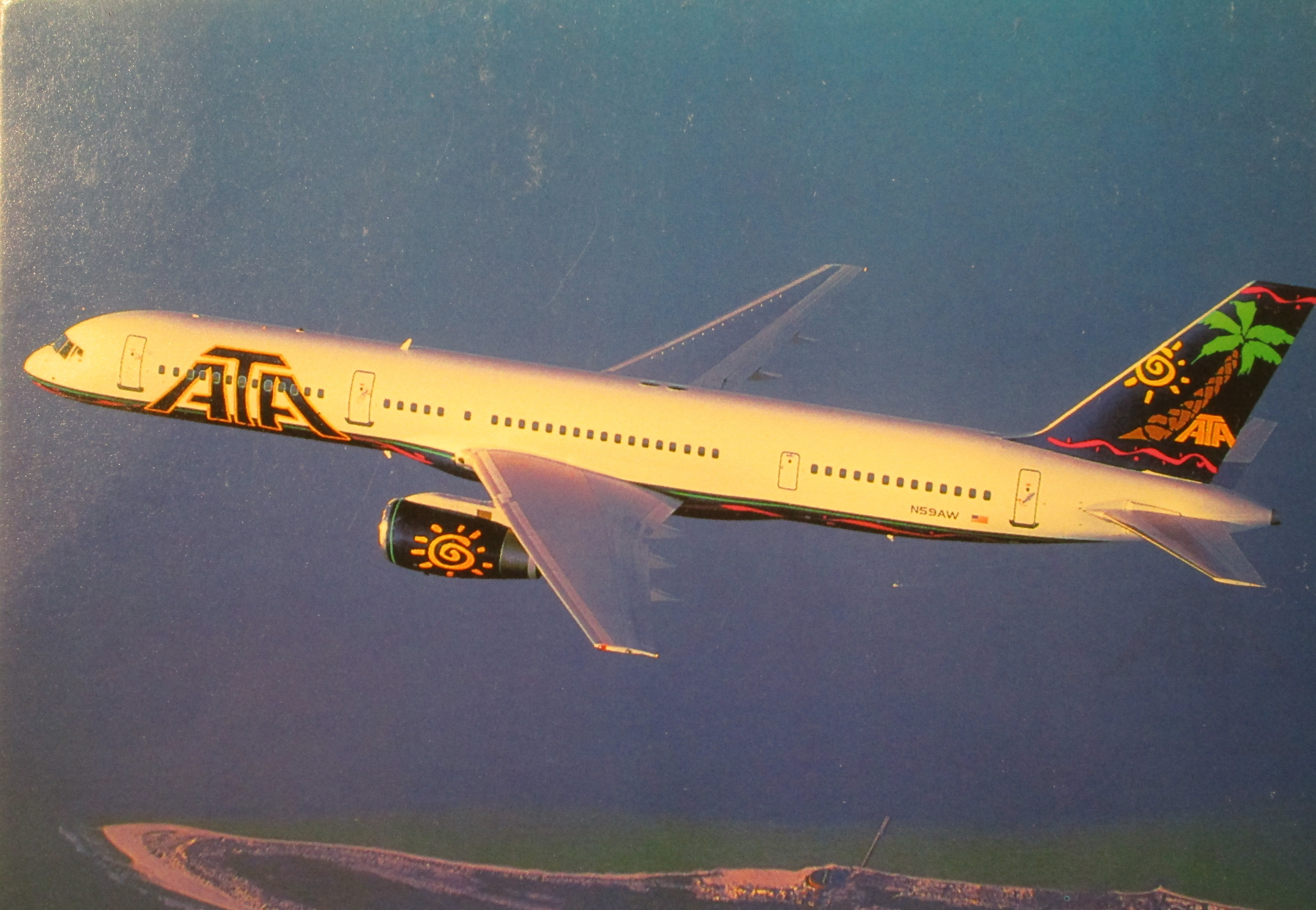
ATA postcard circa 1999 showing a Boeing 757 in "Vacation" livery

== See also ==
- List of defunct airlines of the United States
