= North American Airlines =

Airline of the United States (1989–2014)

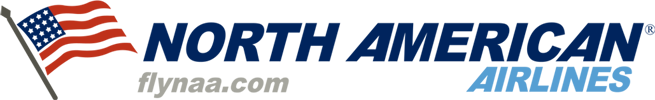

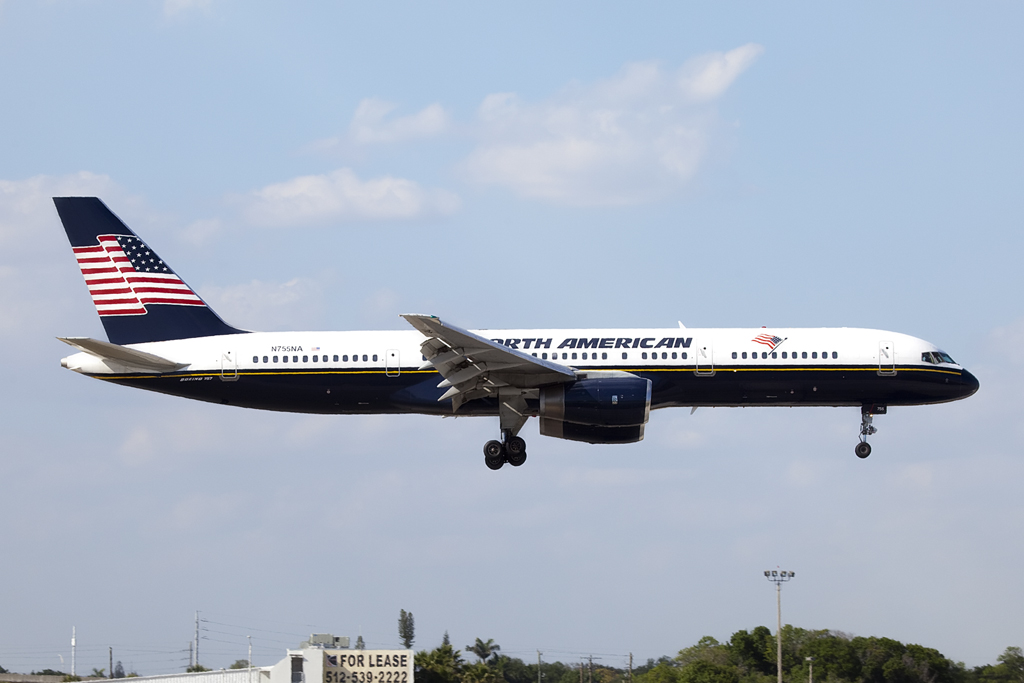
IATA	ICAO	Call sign
NA	NAO	NORTH AMERICAN
- Founded: 1989
- Commenced operations: January 20, 1990
- Ceased operations: June 9, 2014
- Hubs: New York–JFK
- Focus cities: Baltimore
- Parent company: Global Aviation Holdings
- Headquarters: Peachtree City, Georgia, U.S.
- Key people: James Casbarro (COO)

North American Airlines, Inc., was an American airline with its headquarters at the HLH Building in Peachtree City, Georgia in Greater Atlanta, United States. Prior to May 2008, it operated scheduled international services from the U.S. to Africa and Guyana. Later it operated domestic and international charter services and wet lease services. Its main aircraft and maintenance base was Tampa International Airport.

== History ==
North American Airlines was a subsidiary of Global Aviation Holdings, Inc., formerly Global Aero Logistics, Inc. Unlike the other airlines that are or were a part of Global Aviation, ATA Airlines (now defunct) and World Airways (now defunct), North American was founded after airline deregulation in the United States.

North American was established in 1989 and began operations on January 20, 1990. It was founded by Dan McKinnon, former head of the then-Civil Aeronautics Board. The airline was acquired by World Air Holdings in April 2005.

It began by flying charter flights on Boeing 757 aircraft. The company grew during the 1990s, adding flights to San Juan, Puerto Rico, various spots in Mexico and other destinations. North American also started a scheduled flight from Los Angeles International Airport to JFK to complement El Al's existing Tel Aviv-JFK-LAX run and provide the Israeli airline with more passengers. North American also opened operations in Newark, New Jersey, and Oakland, California, at that time. In addition to their original 757s, North American also operated Boeing 767s for long-range, high-density charter flights.

On April 5, 2007, New ATA Holdings, Inc., bought out North American Airlines parent company World Air Holdings, Inc. and promptly changed the name of the holding company to Global Aero Logistics, Inc. to reflect the worldwide desires of the latest owners. The same firm, MatlinPatterson had recently divested themselves of Varig at the end of March 2006, although they still maintained financial interests at its former cargo subsidiary VarigLog (LC). The company was renamed Global Aviation Holdings, Inc., on Feb. 26, 2009.

North American shut down in March 2014 for bankruptcy reasons.

== Destinations ==
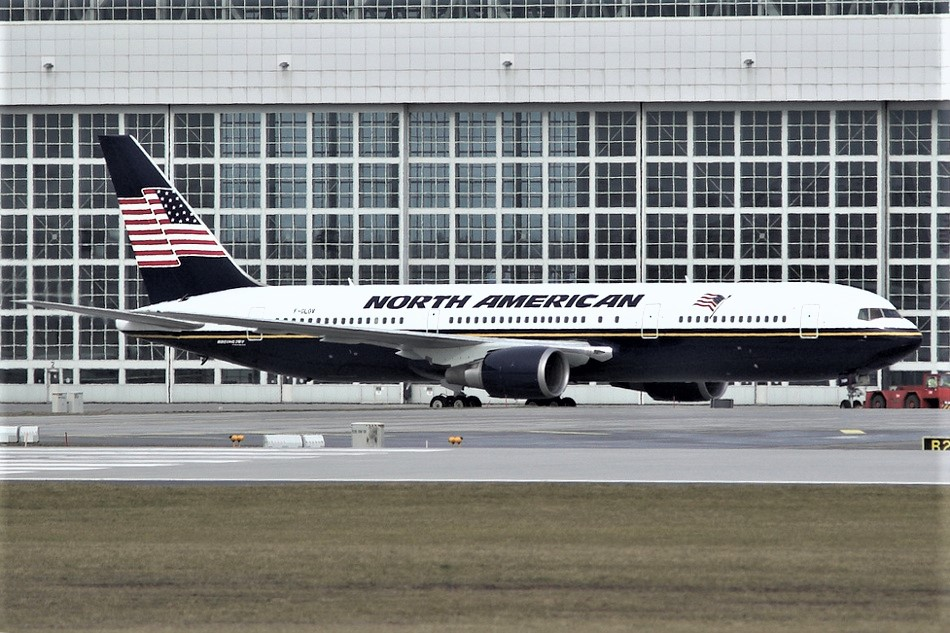
North American Boeing 767-300

North American Airlines discontinued all scheduled operations in May 2008. At the time of this shut down, the airline operated scheduled passenger flights to the following destinations:

Bolivia

- Santa Cruz de la Sierra - Viru Viru International Airport (on behalf of AeroSur to Miami) - Service ended mid-2010

Ghana

- Accra - Accra International Airport - Service ended May 20, 2008

Guyana

- Georgetown - Cheddi Jagan International Airport - Service ended May 18, 2008

Nigeria

- Lagos - Murtala Mohammed International Airport - Service ended May 18, 2008

Trinidad

- Port of Spain, Trinidad - Piarco International Airport - Service ended May 18, 2008

United States

- Baltimore - Baltimore/Washington International Thurgood Marshall Airport - Focus City - Service ended May 20, 2008
- Miami - Miami International Airport (on behalf of AeroSur)
- New York City - John F. Kennedy International Airport - Hub - Service ended May 20, 2008
- Tampa - Tampa International Airport

Dominican Republic

Santo Domingo Las Americas Airport

Announced on February 19, 2008, North American Airlines planned on discontinuing all scheduled service in May 2008 in favor of concentrating on charter operations. According to a news release on northamericanair.com, "What makes NAA's scheduled service operations untenable is the rising cost of fuel, with jet fuel costs increasing 60 percent since 2005. This was a difficult decision, especially in light of the continuing support we have received from the governments and the traveling public in these markets. NAA's modern Boeing 757/767 fleet is in high demand and NAA will redeploy these aircraft profitably in the charter market".

North American Airlines discontinued service to Hawaii as of September 1, 2005. Prior to Delta Air Lines establishing service between New York City and Accra, Ghana, on December 11, 2006, NAA's New York-Accra and Baltimore-Banjul services were the only scheduled non-stop service between the U.S. and West Africa operated by a U.S. airline for several years..

Earlier scheduled service included Aguadilla in Puerto Rico, Santiago and Santo Domingo in Dominican Republic. Each of these routes was canceled after JetBlue Airways began competing on these routes. According to conversations with Dan McKinnon and Steve Harfst (former COO), there was no desire for the company to compete with the low fare cost structure of JetBlue.

=== Charters ===
North American's charter operations made up the bulk of its business: resorts such as Club Med and tour operators in Hawaii and the Caribbean chartered North American's aircraft on a regular basis. Since discontinuing all scheduled service in May 2008, North American Airlines continued to operate until 2014 as solely a charter airline.

== Fleet ==
As of March 2014, the North American Airlines fleet included 6 aircraft:

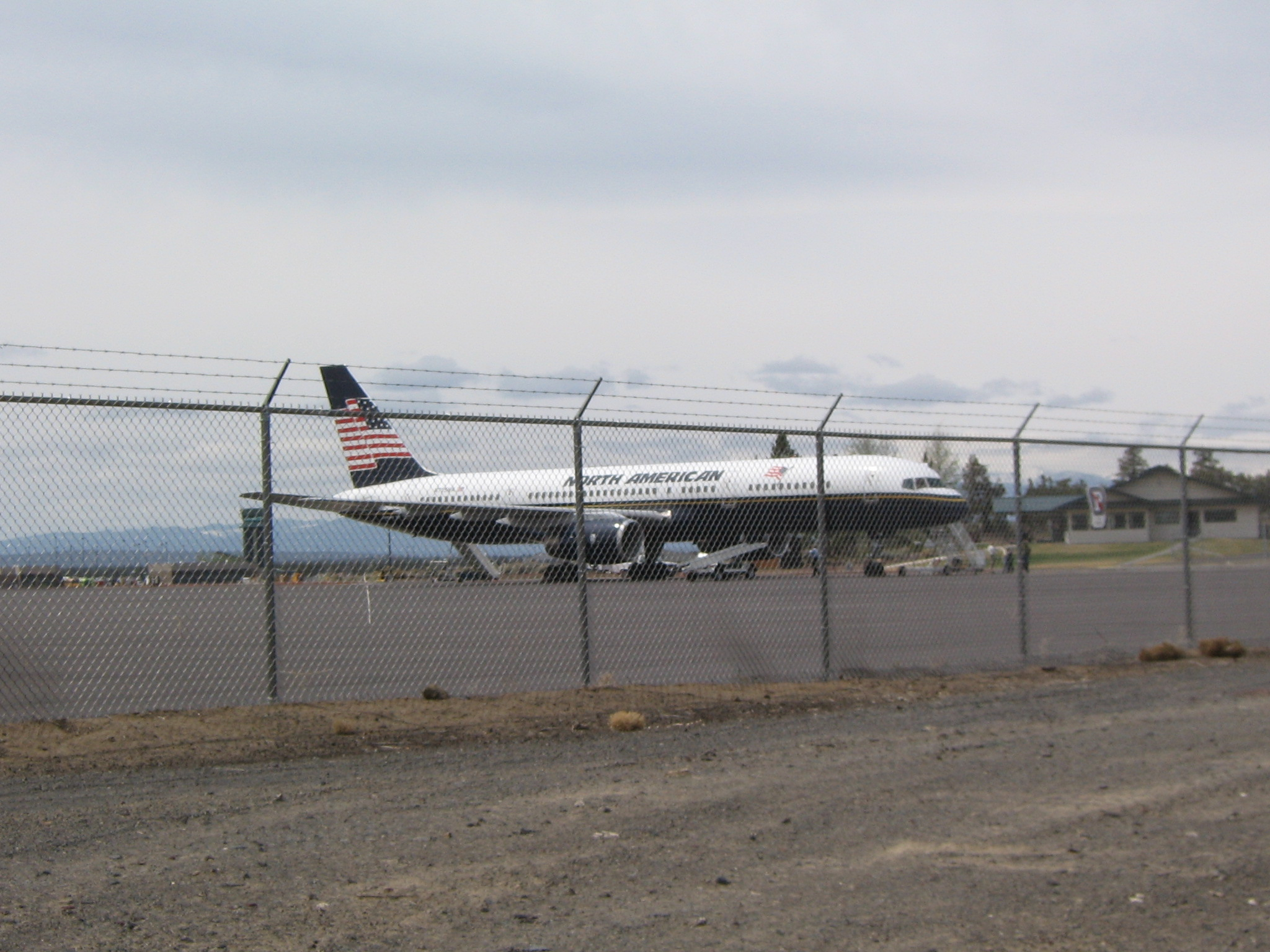
North American Airlines 757-200 at the Redmond airport USFS aerial firefighting ramp.

North American Airlines Fleet
Aircraft	In Service	Storage	Passengers			Notes
Aircraft	In Service	Storage	C	Y	Total	Notes
Boeing 757-200	1	0	30	176	206	
Boeing 757-200	1	0	0	247	247	
Boeing 767-300ER	5	0	30	176	206	
Boeing 767-300ER	5	0	0	247	247	
Total	6	0				

As of May 2013, the average fleet age of North American Airlines was 18.1 years.

North American Airlines historical fleet
Aircraft	Total	Introduced	Retired	Remark
Boeing 737-800	2	1998	2003	N800NA, N802NA
Boeing 757-200	10	1990	2013	
Boeing 767-300	7	2001	2015	
McDonnell Douglas MD-83	1	1992	1998	N183NA

== Services ==
As a certified United States Department of Defense air carrier, NAA provided military personnel and their dependents air transportation to destinations not served by commercial airlines. North American was the first airline to provide the capability of the Boeing 767 aircraft to the United States Military in 2002. NAA operated military transport flights out of Dallas/Ft. Worth Airport and other locations.

The carrier maintained a long-standing wet lease relationship with Air Jamaica, providing wet-leased 767 aircraft and crew for the airline's Kingston-New York service. In the summer of 2007, Air Jamaica increased its dependence on North American Airlines' services as the Jamaican company struggled to cope with higher-than-expected demand.

North American Airlines also operated charter cargo service to Gibraltar in co-operation with the Odyssey Marine Exploration.

North American Airlines also served as then Senator Barack Obama' campaign carrier, flying him, his staff and the press through Election Day. When he was named the Democratic nominee, the aircraft, a Boeing 757, underwent a major overhaul. The interior was fitted with 4 captains chairs, a table with seating for 4, as well as 16 business class seats for staff. In addition, the exterior was repainted with the campaign logo and slogan "Change We Can Believe In".

== See also ==
- List of defunct airlines of the United States
