= Government contract flight =

Charter flight contracted with government agency

A government contract flight is a type of charter airline operation contracted with a government agency.

In the United States, the massive mobility requirements during World War II proved that military transport could not meet all the logistical needs that might arise. As a result, the Civil Reserve Air Fleet (CRAF) was developed to use airline capacity to provide maximum airlift support in wartime situations. As a benefit, airlines that commit planes to CRAF are able to receive peacetime government contracts in an amount proportional to the airline's potential wartime mobilization value. This is the basis for most routine military charter flights. The government receives an extremely economical source of emergency capacity as well as reasonable costs for peacetime military transportation.

== United States passenger operations ==
Most American government contract flights are sponsored by the military. While many of them are used to move cargo, some are operated as scheduled airline services. These flights are virtually identical to standard airline flights, complete with flight attendants, meal service, and in-flight movies. A contract flight returning from an overseas area is often referred to as a freedom bird, since it usually carries military members who are returning to the United States after what is commonly a one-to-three-year tour of duty. The service on board during the Vietnam War was very spartan and did not offer the amenities mentioned above.

During the 1960s and 1970s, the hub for most military charters was Travis Air Force Base (AFB) and McChord Air Force Base on the west coast and McGuire Air Force Base, New Jersey and Charleston Air Force Base, South Carolina on the east coast. These bases connected to a number of foreign hubs, which included Yokota Air Base in Japan and Rhein-Main Air Base in Europe. Starting in the 1980s the military shifted many of its domestic hubs from military bases to commercial airports to better integrate its transportation network with scheduled airline service, thereby avoiding the logistical headaches of transporting passengers between airports and air bases. By 1984 McGuire AFB was replaced with Philadelphia International Airport, and Charleston AFB was replaced with Charleston International Airport. By 1997, Philadelphia was replaced with Baltimore-Washington International Airport (BWI), Maryland and Charleston International Airport replaced with Atlanta, Georgia.

Historically, services were provided to each military theater as follows:

- Germany. Flying Tiger Line flew Lockheed Constellation aircraft to Rhein Main AB via Gander, Newfoundland. Trans Caribbean Airways also flew from McGuire to Rhein Main in the mid-1960s, with a stopover at Prestwick in Scotland. During the 1970s Capitol Air Lines operated a large share of flights from Charleston to Rhein Main via Windsor Locks. During the 1990s the main trunk route was from Baltimore to Rhein-Main Air Base using Tower Air Boeing 747s. The current trunk route is from Atlanta–Frankfurt or Atlanta–Baltimore–Frankfurt using World Airways DC-10 aircraft.
- Japan. Yokota Air Base near Tokyo has historically been the major United States airlift hub for Asia. Most flights to Yokota were once operated by Flying Tiger Line. This started during the 1950s with Lockheed Constellation service from Travis AFB via Cold Bay, Adak, and Misawa AB and continued through the 1980s.
- Korea. The Air Mobility Command chartered flights several times weekly to and from Osan Air Base and the west coast of the United States (sometimes via Yokota Air Base, Japan or Kadena Air Base, Japan) for the purpose of ferrying servicemembers and families to and from their duty assignments. At various times, the West Coast port was Los Angeles International Airport, Oakland International Airport and lastly Seattle–Tacoma International Airport. Flying Tiger Line held the initial contract in the 1980s, which passed to FedEx when that company purchased Flying Tigers, the only time in its history FedEx entered the passenger transport business. In the early 1990s the contract passed to Northwest Airlines briefly before finding a permanent home with World Airways. These flights flew Boeing 747 aircraft until the mid-1990s, when it was replaced by the McDonnell Douglas MD-11. Officials at Osan AB discouraged the popular nickname "Freedom Bird" for this flight, as it implied a tour of duty in Korea was less than desirable. The flight was officially known as the "Osan Eagle", later renamed "Patriot Express" (PE). The charter flights operated until 30 September 2005, when Department of Defense cutbacks forced United States Transportation Command (USTRANSCOM) to reduce PE service. Flights still continued to Japan and Europe, but in reduced capacity. In April 2010, USTRANSCOM resumed PE service to Korea, arriving and departing from both Osan and Kunsan Air Bases twice a week using Boeing 757 and 767 aircraft.
- Philippines. Flights to the Philippines were operated by Flying Tiger Line Lockheed Constellation planes in the 1960s from Travis via Honolulu, Wake, and Guam. In the early 1970s World Airways DC-8 service from Travis AFB via Cold Bay and Yokota AB, replaced by Trans International Airlines DC-8 service via a southern route (Travis – Hickam – Andersen – Clark). Starting in 1980, Flying Tiger Line Boeing 747s were used on a northern route (St. Louis – Los Angeles – Anchorage – Kadena – Clark).
- Vietnam. The Douglas DC-8 was used for the contract operations of Overseas National Airways, Seaboard World Airlines, Flying Tiger Line, Saturn, World Airways and United. A World Airways DC-8 was the last scheduled flight out of Saigon before its capture in 1975. Boeing aircraft, primarily the Boeing 707, were used for contract operations of Northwest Orient, Continental and Pan Am. Flights serving Vietnam operated from five locations in that country: Da Nang, Cam Ranh Bay, Saigon (Tan Son Nhut), Bien Hoa and Phu Cat. Service usually originated at Travis AFB, McChord AFB, Moffett or Los Angeles with stops in Anchorage, Cold Bay, Kadena, Yokota AB, Honolulu, Guam, and/or Clark AFB.
- Turkey. Through the early 1980s, charters were not scheduled into Incirlik Air Base; passengers had to connect to Rhein Main AB via C-141 Starlifter. This changed in the early 1990s when ATA Airlines L-1011 service was provided via Rhein Main or Italy.
- Azores/Spain/Italy. One major trunk route used since the 1990s (Norfolk – Lajes – Rota – Naples – Sigonella) using ATA Airlines Boeing 757 planes. Another route (Baltimore – Lajes – Aviano) uses ATA Airlines L-1011 aircraft.
- Saudi Arabia. During the 1990s an important trunk route originated in Baltimore (Baltimore – Rhein-Main Air Base – Riyadh). Service to Kuwait used ATA Airlines L-1011 aircraft (Baltimore – Lajes AB – Aviano AB – Kuwait).
- Iceland. During the 1960s and 1970s various airlines did the contract route from McGuire AFB, NJ. In 1988, Hawaiian Airlines operated the Norfolk NAS – Philadelphia IAP – Keflavik NAS route using DC-8-62 aircraft once a week. By 1994 the route was being operated by American Trans Air utilizing 757 aircraft along with L-1011s with Rich International supplementing the service. The route was moved to Baltimore when the Philadelphia AMC operation was shut down. By 2000 the service was being operated by Miami Air 737-800s from BWI to KEF. All charter flights were ended in 2005 and all US Forces are scheduled to leave the Keflavik NATO base by 30 Sep 2006.

Noteworthy disasters involving a military charter flight include:

- March 15, 1962: A Flying Tiger Line Constellation crashed while en route from Guam to the Philippines, killing all 107 aboard. The cause was not determined. It remains the worst single Constellation accident to date.
- November 27, 1970: A Capitol International Airways DC-8 crashed at Anchorage, Alaska when its brakes locked and caught fire; 47 out of 229 were killed.
- December 12, 1985: A DC-8, Arrow Air Flight 1285, crashed at Gander, Newfoundland killing all 256 aboard.

Since 1990, scheduled military passenger services have been operated by ATA, World Airways, Evergreen International, Northwest Airlines, Rich International, Sun Country, Tower Air, TWA, ATI, Carnival Air Lines and Omni Air International.

== United States cargo operations ==
The government relies on a number of cargo operators to supplement its own airlift fleet. Contractors include Airlift International, World Airways, and Evergreen International Aviation. On March 23, 1974, an Airlift International DC-8-63 burned at Travis Air Force Base when fuel caught fire during maintenance.

By the 1990s, government contract services for freight were operated by American International, Burlington Air Express, ABX Air, Emery Worldwide, Evergreen International, FedEx, Northwest Airlines, Rich International, Southern Air Transport, Tower Air, TWA, ATI, United Parcel Service, World Airways and Omni Air International.

== See also ==
- Civil Reserve Air Fleet
- Logair
- Quicktrans
