= Global Aviation Holdings =

Airline holding company of the United States

- Type: Private
- Industry: Transportation
- Founded: February 19, 2009
- Headquarters: Peachtree City, Georgia, U.S.
- Products: Airline Services
- Number of employees: 1,200
- Website: www.glah.com

Global Aviation Holdings Inc. (Global) was the parent company of World Airways, Inc. (World), and North American Airlines, Inc. (North American), headquartered in Peachtree City, Georgia, US. Its airline holdings included World and North American along with ATA Airlines until the parent company renamed from Global Aero Logistics to Global Aviation Holdings. ATA, World, and North American all were Part 121 U.S.-certified air carriers providing customized air transportation services for major international passenger and cargo carriers, international freight forwarders, the U.S. military, international leisure tour operators, and international corporations.

On November 12, 2013, the company announced that it is once again filing for Chapter 11 bankruptcy protection, shut down World Airways, and sold the remaining assets of North American Airlines in 2014. The company had previously entered Chapter 11 bankruptcy on February 15, 2012, not long after shuffling assets and closing ATA Airlines. In 2008 Global emerged from bankruptcy on February 13, 2013.

== Global Aviation Holdings circa 2008-2012 ==
Global Aviation Holdings had combined revenues of more than $1 billion, 30 leased aircraft (most from GECAS and ILFC), and more than 2,200 employees. Global Aviation Holdings provides services in the passenger, commercial passenger ad-hoc lease and wet lease charter, military-on-demand, and cargo charter ACMI markets through its two airline subsidiaries.

Among Global Aviation Holdings' significant competitors in passenger transportation, that specialize in AMC charter contracts and (ACMI) and charter markets, are Omni Air International and Ryan International Airlines. On the cargo side, Global Aviation Holdings operations performed by World Airways remain distant rivals to the vastly growing ABX Air's airline holdings operations and network which include the much smaller (ATI) Air Transport International and Capital Cargo International Airlines, at one time fierce competitors for similar contracts. North American flew to the African continent with a link up to Virgin Nigeria Airlines, but all scheduled passenger service was discontinued in May 2008 as a result of the 2007-2008 fuel price rises. Global Aviation Holdings had substantial fleet operations transiting through Atlanta ATL, New York (JFK), Baltimore Washington BWI, Dallas Ft. Worth DFW and Houston (IAH) on a regular basis.

=== Fleet ===
As of May 2013, Global Aviation Holdings had 14 wide-body transoceanic capable aircraft in its fleet:

Global Aviation Holdings Fleet
Aircraft	Total	Passengers			Business	Notes
Aircraft	Total	B	C	Total	Business	Notes
North American Airlines Fleet
Boeing 757-200	0	16	183	199	Passenger
Boeing 767-300	5	30; 0	176; 247	206; 247	Passenger
World Airways Fleet
McDonnell Douglas MD-11	3	0	355	355	Passenger
McDonnell Douglas MD-11F	4				Cargo
Boeing 747-400BDSF	2				Cargo

Global Aviation Holdings was expected to receive some Airbus A330-200F aircraft from an order placed by parent company MatlinPatterson prior to the closing of ATA Airlines. After the Boeing 757 was withdrawn from North American Airlines service, Global Aviation Holdings and North American Airlines became one of a small number airlines to operate only wide-body aircraft, much like its primary competitor Omni Air International, which too has no narrow-body aircraft. According to the referenced article in Businessweek, MatlinPatterson withdrew its Airbus order to resupply the Global fleet with newer technology widebody aircraft.

=== Destinations ===
As of May 2008, Global Aviation Holdings subsidiaries North American Airlines and World Airways did not offer any scheduled service. They operated flights into more than 120 countries in 2009.

== History ==
Originally named AmTran (Holdings) prior to 2002 and based in Indianapolis, Indiana, the holding company's name was changed to ATA Holdings Corporation, for increased transparency and to attract financial investors after the September 11 attacks economic hardships that affected the industry. ATA Holdings was a publicly traded company.

On April 8, 2004, ATA Holdings announced the sale of ATA Training Corporation to Aviation Institute of Maintenance in order to focus on the passenger and charter business. ATA Training provided training for aircraft technicians. It was founded in Indianapolis in 1992.

ATA Holdings Corp. traded on the NASDAQ as "ATAH" until the company filed bankruptcy proceedings in October, 2004.

On April 5, 2007, New ATA Holdings, Inc., the successor company to ATA Holdings, changed its name to Global Aero Logistics Inc. (GAL). Shortly afterwards it announced the agreement to purchase World Airways and North American Airlines. Late in 2007, GAL quietly moved its headquarters to Peachtree City, Georgia, where World Airways is headquartered. Global Aero Logistics provides military and commercial air transportation charters throughout the world.

- AMTRAN, INC. (Holdings) -------------------- 2002
- ATA Holdings Corp. --------------------------- 2003–2007
- Global Aero Logistics Inc. (Holdings) -- 2007–2009
- Global Aviation Holdings Inc. ------------ 2009–present

According to an Indianapolis press release from Global Aero Logistics Inc., and North American airlines in 2006, the combined companies of North American, ATA, and World revenues were approximately US$1.6 billion.

== Bankruptcies ==
On October 26, 2004, ATA Holdings, Inc., the former parent company of ATA Airlines, filed voluntary petitions for relief under Chapter 11 of the United States Bankruptcy Code, along with seven of its subsidiaries: ATA Airlines, Chicago Express Airlines, ATA Cargo, ATA Leisure Corp., ATA Training Corp., Amber Travel, and ExecuJet.

Logo of ATA Airlines

Logo of World Airways

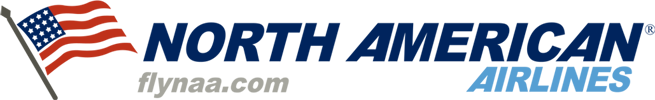
Logo of North American Airlines

The company and its subsidiaries continued for one and a half years to operate as debtors-in-possession under the jurisdiction of the Bankruptcy Court, and in accordance with the applicable provisions of the Bankruptcy Code, the Federal Rules of Bankruptcy Procedure and applicable court orders.

On April 2, 2008, ATA Airlines filed Chapter 11 bankruptcy and immediately ceased all operations. The sibling airlines continued to operate. With the decision to close ATA Airlines, the MatlinPatterson hedge fund in control of the remaining assets of ATA Airlines and World Air Holdings acquired the cargo carrier Arrow Air.

On February 5, 2012, Global Aviation Holdings, filed Chapter 11 bankruptcy.

== Restructuring ==
After the company's bankruptcy filing on October 26, 2004, drastic measures were taken to turn the company around and make it profitable. As part of its restructuring, J. George Mikelsons ATA's founder and director stepped away from the MatlinPatterson Global Aero Logistics firm, and the directorship of ATA named John G. Denison as CEO in February 2005. Later that year, launched their first codeshare agreement, with Southwest Airlines, which had been spearheaded earlier by Mikelsons. ATA also cut down its scheduled operations, most significantly from its former hub at Chicago Midway International Airport.

ATA sold Ambassadair Travel Club in 2004 to Grueninger Cruises and Tours, based in Indianapolis.

On February 28, 2006, New ATA Holdings Inc. emerged from Chapter 11 United States Bankruptcy Protection.

== Emergence of Global Aero Logistics ==
On April 5, 2007, Global Aero Logistics announced an agreement to acquire World Air Holdings, Inc. in a $315 million all-cash transaction. Simultaneously, New ATA Holdings officially announced their name had been changed to Global Aero Logistics, Inc., effective immediately, to reflect their diverse global operations and its recent acquisition of companies with the financial backing of the Matlin Patterson Global Opportunities investment firm. Terms of the $315 million deal were that Global Aero Logistics Inc. would operate ATA Airlines, North American Airlines, and World Airways under one umbrella (Global Aero Logistics) with each airline (ATA, North American, and World) operating independently when the transaction was completed in the third quarter of 2007.

In 2007 the parent company of ATA said that it was changing its name to Global Aero Logistics Inc. and was acquiring the parent company of North American Airlines. Pacific Business News said during that year "There are interesting synergies between ATA and World Air Holdings."

== Management ==
- John Graber, chief executive officer (CEO) of Global Aviation Holdings Inc.
- Bill Garrett, chief financial officer (CFO) of Global Aviation Holdings Inc. from MatlinPatterson.
- Suzanne Mueller, executive vice president, general counsel and secretary
- Brian Bauer, senior vice president and chief marketing officer (CMO) of Global Aviation Holdings Inc.
- James Casbarro, senior vice president, and chief operating officer (COO) of North American Airlines
- Eric Bergesen, senior vice president, and COO of World Airways
