= City of Flint Municipal Center =

Government office complex in Michigan, US

- U.S. National Register of Historic Places
- U.S. Historic district
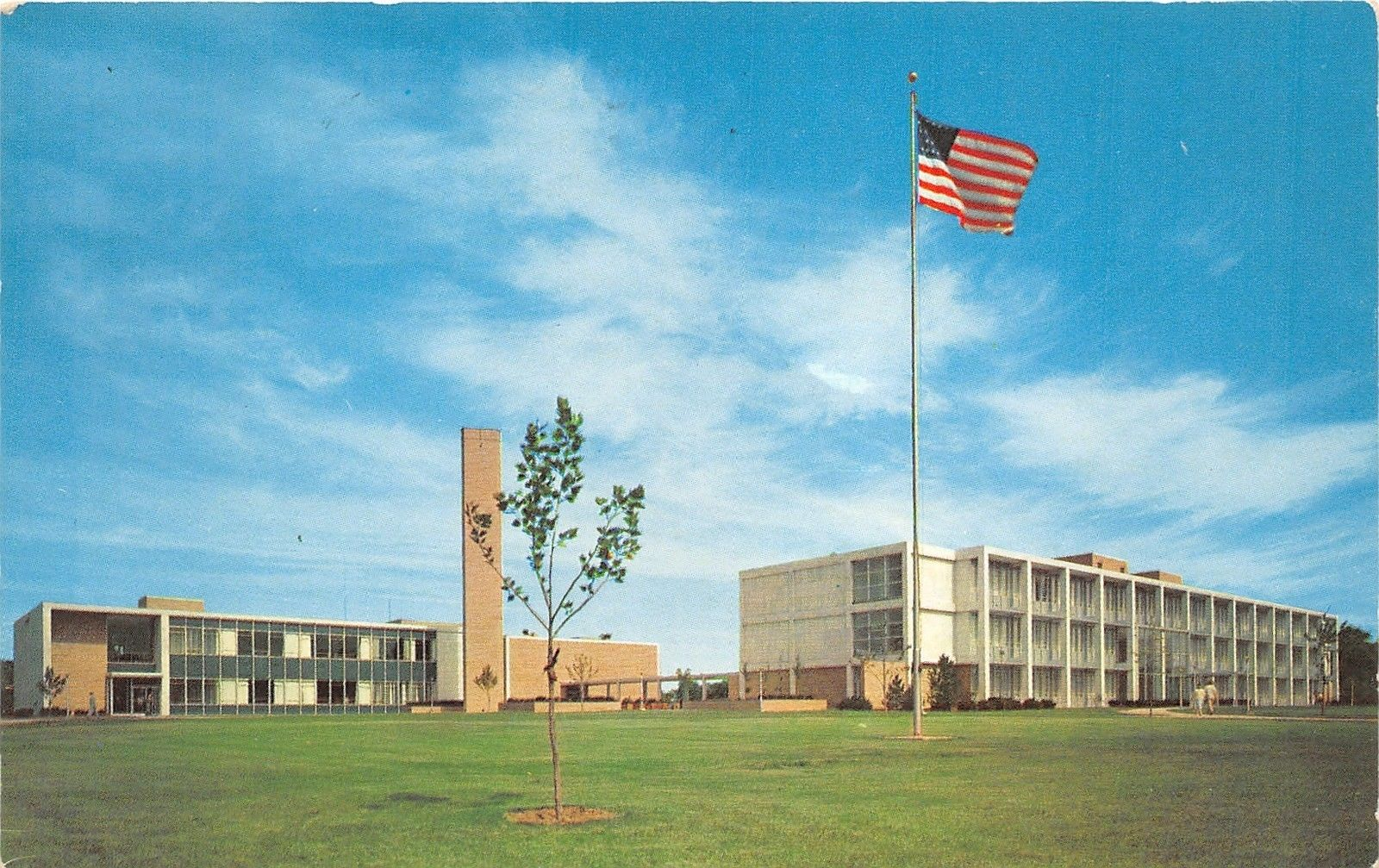
- Interactive map
- Location: 1101 Saginaw St., 210 East Fifth St., 310 East Fifth St., Flint, Michigan
- Coordinates: 43°0′59″N 83°41′20″W
- Built: 1955
- Built by: Sorenson-Gross Construction Company
- Architect: H. E. Beyster and Associates, Inc., A. Charles Jones and Associates
- Architectural style: International Style
- NRHP reference No.: 100004775
- Added to NRHP: December 19, 2019

The City of Flint Municipal Center is a complex of seven government office buildings located at 1101 Saginaw Street, 210 East Fifth Street, 310 East Fifth Street in Flint, Michigan. The area was listed on the National Register of Historic Places in 2019.

== History ==
By the late 1940s, the then-current Flint City hall was 40 years old and in dire need of maintenance, as well as being too small for the number of employees working for the city. In November 1953, Flint residents voted on a ballot measure to fund construction of a municipal center to alleviate the issue, and approved the issuance of a $5 million bond. The city of Flint contacted urban planner Robert Moses to select the site. In 1955, the selected site was cleared, and in 1956 the city selected the Detroit firm of H. E. Beyster & Associates to design the project and the Flint-based Sorenson-Gross Construction Company to construct it. Ground was soon broken, and by 1957 the first buildings, the Public Health Building and associated Public Health Auditorium, were open for use. In 1958, the Police Department Headquarters, Municipal Court, and City Hall were opened. In 1958, Flint voters approved another bond issue to complete the Fire Department Headquarters This was designed by the Flint firm of A. Charles Jones and Associates, and was opened in 1960. The complex has served as the home of Flint's government since that time.

== Description ==
The City of Flint Municipal Center contains seven International Style buildings that were constructed between 1957 and about 1959, positioned around the outer edges of a rectangular park. Most of the buildings are rectangular in plan, constructed primarily of brick, and rise no more than three stories. The buildings in the complex include:

- City Hall: This is a three-story building with a rectilinear footprint and a flat roof. Pilasters covered with marble divide the sides into bays. The majority of the bay openings are filled with large plate glass windows with blue metal spandrels.
- Public Health Building (currently known as City Hall South Building): This building is a single story structure clad in yellow and light brown brick. The side are divided into bays by white marble pilasters.
- Police Department Headquarters: This is a two-story building, twelve bays wide, each bay filled with plate glass and yellow metal panels and separated with concrete pilasters. It has a flat roof and is covered with brick, with marble trim at the corners, on the cornice, and at the water table.
- Municipal Courts Building (now occupied by the Police Department): This building is rectilinear with a flat roof, and is connected to the police headquarters with a narrow walkway. One side is clad in brick, with the others clad in marble.
- Public Health Auditorium (currently known as the Auditorium): This building is a circular dome, connected to the Public Health Building' by a walkway.
- Fire Department Headquarters: This building contains two rectangular wings, and is two stories with a walk-out lower level. It has a three-story tower.
- Powerhouse: This building is located below grade, with a four-story triangular chimney exposed.
