= John G. Denison =

John G. Denison was the acting CEO and Chairman of the Board of ATA Airlines and Global Aero Logistics, Inc at the time of ATA's shutdown due to financial insolvency. In 2006, Denison had announced that he would step down as ATA's CEO on January 1, 2007; Denison was replaced with Subodh Karnik. However, Denison had also announced he would continue on as ATA's Chairman of the Board of Directors. He has been an officer of Global Aero Logistics, Inc. since February 21, 2005. Denison returned to his former post as acting CEO of ATA Airlines following Subodh Karnik's abrupt departure in March 2008.

Dension is a former Vice President and CFO of Southwest Airlines. He also successfully commandeered Chrysler Corporation out of a near-liquidation bankruptcy. Denison has since returned to Southwest Airlines and serves on the board of directors since departing the successor company to New ATA Holdings.
