= Operating certificate =

License granted to allow an individual or company to provide a service

Operating certificate is a category of license issued by a government agency allowing an individual or company to provide a controlled type of service. These certificates are generally issued for a limited time period. Certificates can have intrinsic value and in some cases can be sold.

The term can be used to describe the document issued to operate any of the following:

- Airline; (known as an Air Operator's Certificate) the authority to operate an airline
- Airport; in the United States, the authority to operate an airport
- Adult care facility; generally issued by a local authority
- Transportation company; generally issued by a local authority
