= MatlinPatterson =

American distressed securities fund

- Type: Private
- Industry: Private equity
- Founded: 2002; 24 years ago
- Founder: David J. Matlin, Mark R. Patterson
- Headquarters: New York, New York, United States
- Products: Growth capital
- Total assets: $8.9 billion
- Number of employees: 80
- Website: www.matlinpatterson.com

MatlinPatterson is a distressed securities fund that participates in distressed and credit opportunities on a global basis. The firm was established in 2002 as a spinout from Credit Suisse First Boston. It is headquartered in New York City and has offices in London and Hong Kong. MatlinPatterson was founded by David Matlin and Mark Patterson. MatlinPatterson, through MatlinPatterson Global Advisers, manages private equity vehicles with a distressed-for-control mandate as well as an open-ended strategy seeking non-control credit investment opportunities.

MatlinPatterson is managed by co-founder David Matlin, together with Managing Partner, Peter Schoels and Michael Lipsky. Mr. Schoels has served as Managing Partner since 2009 and is also responsible for management of the illiquid investment portfolio. Mr. Lipsky, who joined the Firm in early 2011, is responsible for management of the liquid investment portfolio. Co-founder Mark Patterson serves as Chairman of MatlinPatterson Group.

== History ==
In 1994, David Matlin and Mark Patterson formed the Global Distressed Securities Group at Credit Suisse to invest proprietary capital across a wide range of control and non-control distressed opportunities on a global basis. In 2001, the Distressed Group launched its first private equity fund to invest client capital in distressed-for-control situations and wound down its proprietary investment activity. In 2002, David Matlin and Mark Patterson formed MatlinPatterson as an independent entity to succeed to this business and has since sponsored successor distressed-for-control funds in 2003 and 2007, raising approximately $9 billion in total capital commitments across these three funds, with the most recent Fund being a $5 billion Fund raised in 2007.

In 2007, David Matlin and Matlin Patterson formed an affiliate to leverage the distressed control expertise by offering a non-control liquid trading strategy.

In December 2012, Allied World Assurance, a publicly traded insurance company, acquired a minority interest in the liquid credit business of MatlinPatterson. As part of the transaction, Allied World agreed to invest $500 million in MatlinPatterson's funds.

== MatlinPatterson distressed business investments ==
MatlinPatterson's distressed business pursues illiquid control and activist non-control investment strategies, as well as a range of liquid trading strategies. The firm's control strategies are characterized by its controlling or active participation in distressed companies and their restructurings require a long-term investment outlook. Since 1994, MatlinPatterson and its predecessor entities have invested over $8 billion across 66 control investments. MatlinPatterson's liquid trading strategies seek to generate profits from changes in the price of securities or claims, with the firm remaining largely uninvolved in a restructuring process or distressed company. Since 1994, MatlinPatterson and its predecessor entities have invested approximately $6 billion across 380 passive and active non-control strategies. In July 2009, MatlinPatterson—which acquired Nortel bonds after the company filed for bankruptcy, becoming one of Nortel's largest bondholders—participated in the auction for Nortel's CDMA and LTE wireless assets. Ericsson ultimately outbid NokiaSiemens and MatlinPatterson, paying almost double the initial "stalking horse" bid of $650 million.

In 2007, MatlinPatterson acquired a controlling stake in XL Health, a Baltimore based Medicare Advantage health plan focused on senior citizens with chronic diseases. In 2011, the company was acquired by UnitedHealth Group#UnitedHealthcare after having taken EBITDA from ($112) million in 2007 to a $259 million in 2011. This deal won the operational excellence award for the healthcare segment from Private Equity International magazine.

The firm was also a significant purchaser of WorldCom bonds. The company later was renamed MCI Worldcom and later more simply to MCI prior to its subsequent acquisition by Verizon.

In 2001, MatlinPatterson became the majority owner of Huntsman Corporation, which at the time was the 5th largest chemicals company worldwide, and later became a public company. MatlinPatterson has also made several investments in the energy sector, becoming the largest shareholder of NRG Energy, which was the country's third-largest independent power company, as well as acquiring several power generation facilities in the Southeastern United States.

In 2008, the company purchased a controlling stake in home construction company Standard Pacific Corp, which merged into CalAtlantic Homes in 2015. Between January 2009 and November 2010, MatlinPatterson invested $1 billion to become the controlling shareholder of Flagstar Bancorp of Troy, Michigan.
