= Coleman A. Young International Airport =

Airport in Wayne County, Michigan, U.S.

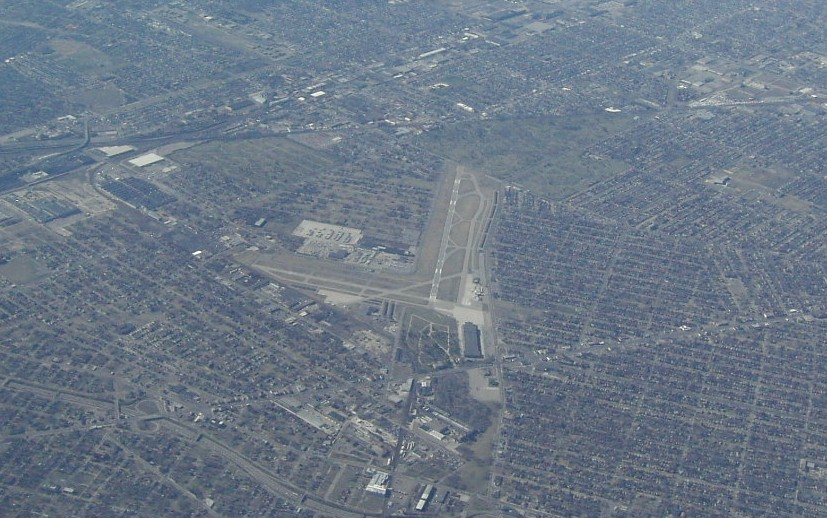
- IATA: DET; ICAO: KDET; FAA LID: DET

Summary
- Airport type: Public
- Owner: City of Detroit
- Serves: Detroit, Michigan
- Opened: October 14, 1927
- Passenger services ceased: September 18, 2000
- Elevation AMSL: 626 ft (191 m)
- Coordinates: 42°24′33″N 083°00′36″W

Map
- Location in Michigan DET/KDET/DET (the United States)

Runways
| Direction | Length | | Surface |
| Direction | ft | m | Surface |
|---|---|---|---|
| 15/33 | 5,090 | 1,551 | Asphalt |

Statistics (2021)
- Aircraft operations: 32,850
- Based aircraft: 65
- Sources: Airport and FAA

Coleman A. Young International Airport (IATA: DET, ICAO: KDET, FAA LID: DET) (Coleman A. Young Municipal Airport, formerly Detroit City Airport until 2003) is six miles northeast of downtown Detroit, in Wayne County, Michigan, United States. It is owned by the City of Detroit. The Federal Aviation Administration (FAA) National Plan of Integrated Airport Systems for 2017–2021 categorized it as a regional general aviation facility. In 2003, it was named in honor of former mayor Coleman Young.

== History ==
Construction of the first hangar at the airport was completed in April 1929. A second hangar was dedicated at the All-American Aircraft Show in April 1930. The 200,000-square-foot (19,000 m^{2}) structure, which also hosted the National Aircraft Show the following year, was stated to be the largest in the world at the time.

In 1989 Mayor Coleman A. Young abandoned a plan to expand the airport's runway because the adjoining Gethsemane Cemetery blocked the way, and surviving relatives protested. A few years later Southwest Airlines ended operations there, citing the city's inability to keep its promises and the need for longer runways to allow for larger jets. In 1988, complaints were registered because the city removed/discarded several families' memorial statuary without notification, replacing them with simple flat in-ground markers, stating that the statues posed a collision risk should an airplane go off the end of the runway.

By early November 2005, it was known as Coleman A. Young International Airport. Plans for a national Tuskegee Airmen museum in a 35,000-square-foot (3,300 m^{2}) hangar at the airport were announced approximately a year and a half later.

The city closed the segment of East McNichols (6 Mile) Road between Conner Street and French Road at the north end of the airport and annexed the land to the airport, allowing for expansion of the approach to Runway 15 and additional service roads. Satellite photos still show some ruins of the original roadbed and a driveway to a motel and topless bar that occupied the south side of McNichols near Conner. A tunneling project could in the future restore the severed East McNichols Road connection and allow an additional 405 feet (123 m) of the main runway to be used for aviation.

The City of Detroit listed the airport as an asset which could be sold to cover debts as a result of the city's 2013 bankruptcy filing. The future of the site as a functioning airport after any sale would have been uncertain. Ultimately, no sale occurred.

In 2015, the Detroit Free Press reported that the Moroun family owned approximately 200 properties near the airport, many of which were purchased for as low as $500 at tax-delinquent property auctions.

In light of a resurgence of the Detroit's finances in the 2010s, the city council with its airport task force started looking at options for investing into the facility's future. Contributing to the Airport Redevelopment and Modernization Program were consulting companies Avion Solutions and Kimley-Horn, and included were officials of the Michigan Department of Transportation and the Federal Aviation Administration.

The airport is envisioned to serve general aviation, while parts of the land currently used by aviation facilities are to be redeveloped. The main runway 15/33 could be lengthened and the supporting structures modernized. There is a proposal to close and remove the shorter runway 7/25. This could limit the options to conduct training flights, relevant in light of plans to locate the Davis Technical Aerospace High School and other educational and commercial users on the airport grounds. Removing the runway could free up 86 acres for industrial development, abetted by its position close to Conrail's railway line. In return, the airport property could be expanded by 196 acres to the west.

In October 2022, the airport had an Airport Layout Plan for the first time in 30 years, making it eligible to receive over $100 million in federal grants over 10 years. This could allow for the addition of hew hangars, building a control tower, and improving taxiways. There's also the possibility to improve the airport's safety zones, including the potential addition of Engineered Material Arrestor System. This allowed the airport to resume talks with nearby homeowners to acquire additional land to expand the airport. However, the proposal to close the shorter runway was opposed by the National Airmen National Museum.

In May 2024, the city of Detroit offered a 30-year leasehold to Avflight, the airport's sole service provider. MyFlight Tours, a helitour company, broke ground on a new 12,000 sq ft (1,100 m^{2}) building in April 2025. The city reached a settlement with a property owner in February 2026 to buy 28 parcels of adjacent land for a safety zone.

== Facilities and aircraft ==
The airport covers 264 acres (107 ha) at an elevation of 626 feet (191 m). It has one active asphalt runway: 15/33 is 5,090 by 100 feet (1,551 m × 30 m) as well as deactivated runway 7/25 which was 4,025 by 100 feet (1,227 m × 30 m).

For the 12-month period ending December 31, 2021, the airport had 32,850 aircraft operations, an average of 90 per day: 96% general aviation, 3% air taxi, <1% commercial, and 1% military. 65 aircraft were then based at the airport: 47 single-engine and 7 multi-engine airplanes as well as 5 jets, 5 helicopters, and 1 ultralight.

Until around 1965, a gas tank 330 feet (100 m) tall was at 42.40817°N 83.00926°W NAD83, less than 630 feet (190 m) west of the centerline of runway 15/33. Since 1994, the city has been working on clearing a federally mandated safety buffer of at least 750 feet (230 m) from the airport's main runway by incrementally buying adjacent land.

Fire protection is provided by the municipal Detroit Fire Department. Budget cuts in 2012 closed Engine Company 20, previously equipped with at least one aircraft rescue and firefighting vehicle, leaving the airport fire station unstaffed. In 2018, it was reported that plans were underway to staff the station for one 8-hour shift each day. In 2020, a construction brief published by the city outlined the work necessary to rehabilitate the fire station building.

The airport has a 1929 aircraft hangar that was designed by architect Albert Kahn.

The airport's passenger terminal also houses facilities for Customs and Border Protection, which serves private and cargo airplanes.

The 53,000-square-foot (4,900 m^{2}) passenger terminal includes space for restaurants, retail concessions, car rental facilities, airline offices, baggage pick-up and claim areas, boarding areas and passenger lounges. The airport has three 1,000 space parking lots.

== Former airline service (1966–2000) ==
The following airlines served Detroit City Airport:

- Wright Air Lines (1966–1985)
- Northwest Airlink (1985–1988)
- Comair (1987–1991)
- Southwest Airlines (1988–1993)
- Direct Air (1988–1990)
- Northcoast Executive Airlines (1988–1990)
- Continental Express (1988–1991)
- Central State Airlines (1989–1990)
- Air Alpha (1991)
- USAir Express (1993–1994)
- Pro Air (1997–2000)

DET was Detroit's primary airport until 1946–47 when almost all airline flights moved to Willow Run Airport and later to Detroit Metropolitan Wayne County Airport. The March 1939 Official Aviation Guide shows 13 weekday departures on American, 10 on Pennsylvania Central and one on Marquette. The June 1946 OAG shows 100 weekday departures on Pennsylvania Central, American, United, Northwest, Eastern, TWA, C&S and Michigan Central.

From July 1988 through September 1993, Southwest Airlines served the airport with 10 to 13 daily flights. Chautauqua Airlines served the airport but ceased service less than a year later. Spirit Airlines planned to fly McDonnell-Douglas DC-9s to DET in 1995, but never began service. Pro Air, a scheduled passenger airline, was based at the airport and grounded by the FAA due to poor maintenance performance after less than a year. The airport now has no scheduled passenger airline service.

== Accidents and incidents ==
- On Saturday 19 November 1949 a Douglas C-47A-90DL (DC-3) operated by Meteor Air Transport NC54337 crashed into a house on Detroit’s east side while on a (second attempt) landing approach to Detroit City Airport. Both pilots and one occupant of the house were killed. "Probable Cause: 'The pilot's action in making a steep turn on final approach without at the same time maintaining adequate airspeed, causing the aircraft to settle to the ground.'" (This information originally derived from CAB File No. 1-0126.) Ref. Aviation Safety Network Report https://asn.flightsafety.org/asndb/336285
- On June 24, 2018, a small plane crashed en route to City Airport. It impacted power lines and a tree. The pilot and one passenger were killed, and a third was rescued.
- On December 3, 2019, a British Aerospace BAe-125-800A business jet slid off the runway during landing at the airport. The aircraft was arriving from a flight from Willow Run. Investigators found the aircraft encountered icing conditions on approach and failed to add the necessary safety margins to their airspeed to prevent stall. It was also found the aircraft's stick shaker, a system designed to warn pilots of impending stall, failed to activate. Thus, with the low speed and inadequate warnings, the aircraft stalled close to the runway. The two pilots on board were not injured.
- On February 18, 2022, an Embraer Phenom 100 suffered a runway excursion after landing. The aircraft struck airport lighting equipment. The sole pilot on board was not injured. The probable cause was found to be the pilot's decision to land on a contaminated runway with previous reports of unfavorable braking action.

== See also ==
- Coleman A. Young (1918–1997), former mayor of Detroit, and airport's namesake
- Detroit Metropolitan Airport, the larger international airport and currently the primary passenger airport in the Detroit area
- List of airports in Michigan
- Oakland County International Airport, a major general aviation and business airport in neighboring Oakland County
- Toledo Express Airport, a commercial airport in Toledo, Ohio, approximately 82 miles southwest of DET
- Willow Run Airport, the major Detroit airport from 1947 until the early 60s, when flights switched to Metro Airport
- Windsor International Airport, a commercial airport in Windsor, Ontario on the Canadian side of the Detroit River
