= Dayton International Airport =

Airport

James M. Cox Dayton International Airport

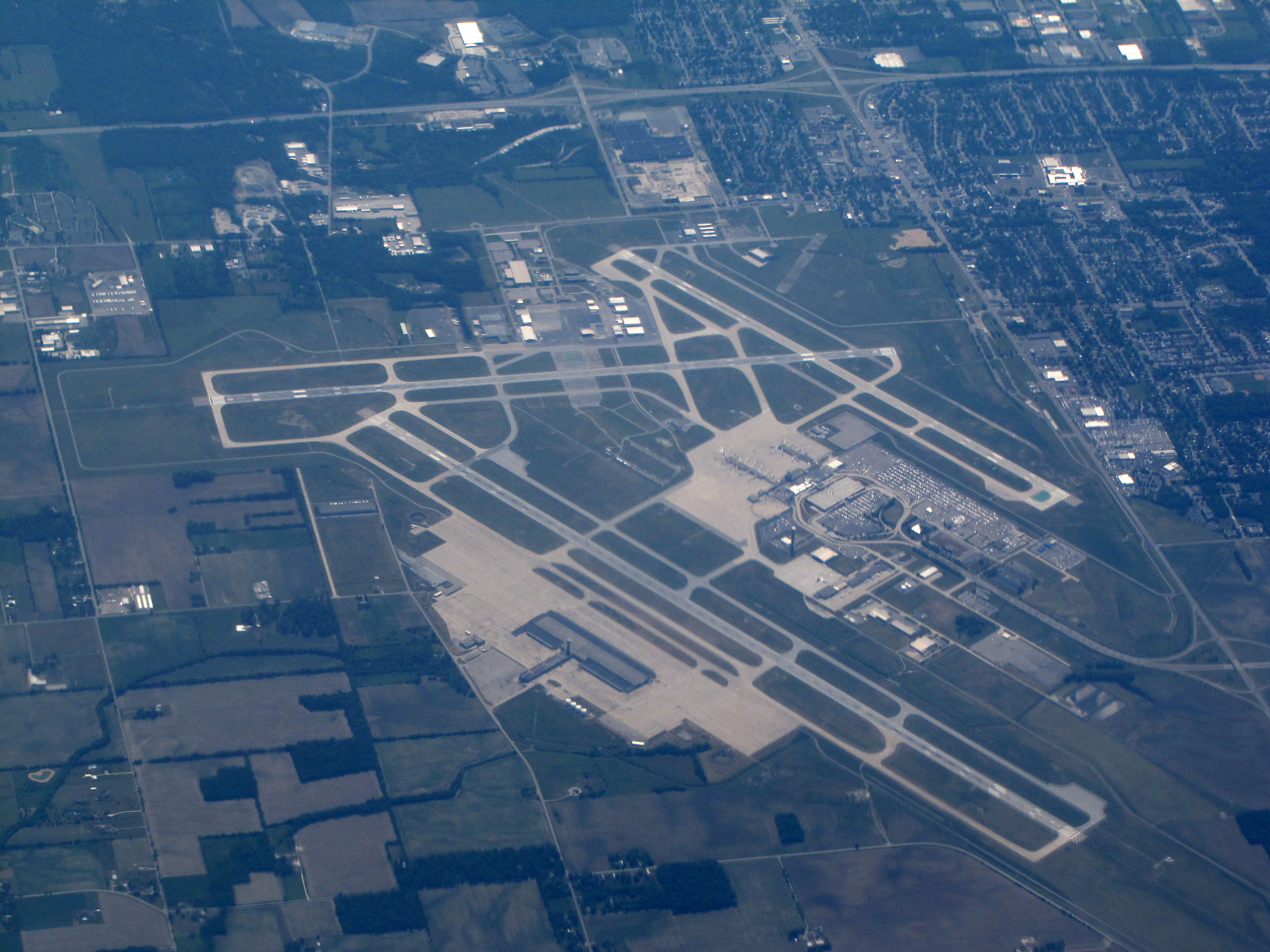
- Airport in June 2012
- IATA: DAY; ICAO: KDAY; FAA LID: DAY

Summary
- Airport type: Public
- Owner: City of Dayton
- Operator: Dayton Department of Aviation
- Location: Dayton, Ohio
- Elevation AMSL: 1,009 ft (308 m)
- Coordinates: 39°54′08″N 84°13′10″W
- Website: www.flydayton.com

Maps
- FAA airport diagram
- Interactive map of James M. Cox; Dayton International Airport

Runways
Direction	Length		Surface
Direction	ft	m	Surface
06L/24R	10,901	3,323	Asphalt/concrete
06R/24L	7,285	2,220	Concrete
18/36	8,502	2,591	Asphalt/concrete

Statistics (2025)
- Aircraft operations: 37,614
- Cargo tonnage: 7,416.92
- Landed weight (1,000 pound units): 873,648.38
- Passenger enplanements: 657,005
- Based Aircraft (2021): 34
- Sources: FAA, airport website, ACI

Dayton International Airport (IATA: DAY, ICAO: KDAY, FAA LID: DAY) (officially James M. Cox Dayton International Airport) is 10 miles (16 km; 8.7 nmi) north of downtown Dayton, in Montgomery County, Ohio, United States. The airport is in an exclave of the city of Dayton not contiguous with the rest of the city.

The National Plan of Integrated Airport Systems called it a primary commercial service airport. Dayton International is the third busiest and third largest airport in Ohio behind Cleveland Hopkins International Airport and John Glenn Columbus International Airport. (While Cincinnati's airport is also busier, it is located in the neighboring state of Kentucky.) The airport was formerly known as Dayton Municipal Airport and James M. Cox-Dayton Municipal Airport.

Dayton International Airport handled 2,607,528 passengers in 2012 and had 57,914 combined takeoffs and landings in 2012. Dayton ranked No. 76 in U.S. airport boardings in 2008. The airport has non-stop flights to 17 destinations.

== History ==
In August 1928 a property in Vandalia, Ohio was called the "Dayton Airport".

The layout of four proposed 100-foot (30 m) wide paved runways – 4,000-foot (1,200 m) east-west, 3,400-foot (1,000 m) northeast-southwest, 3,400-foot (1,000 m) northwest-south east and 2,400-foot (730 m) north-south – was unveiled in February 1936. Construction began in mid May, the design of a terminal with a 7,520 sq ft (699 m^{2}) footprint was approved in early October and the first transport plane to land on one of the new runways arrived on a test run in late November. The airport opened on 17 December 1936. By June 1937, the north-south runway had not been built.

The Northwest-Vandalia Modification Center began operations in July 1943 in eight large cinderblock hangars that had been built at the airport. At the same time, the runways were widened to 150 feet (46 m).

In October 1952, the city named the airport James M. Cox Dayton Municipal Airport in honor of the former Governor of Ohio and Democratic candidate for President of the United States. A groundbreaking ceremony was held in 1959 for a new $5.5 million terminal designed by Yount, Sullivan and Lecklider, completed in 1961.

The April 1957 OAG shows 73-weekday departures: 56 TWA, 13 American, and 4 Lake Central. TWA had two nonstops to New York but no other nonstops reached beyond Chicago-Detroit-Cleveland-Pittsburgh-Cincinnati. The first jets were TWA Convair 880s from Chicago in January 1961.

The eight former modification center hangars were torn down in 1966.

The facility was renamed James M. Cox Dayton International Airport in April 1976 and the first international flight landed two months later.

The airport was a hub for Piedmont Airlines from July 1, 1982, until its merger with US Airways, which continued the Dayton hub for a year or two. In March 1988 Piedmont had nonstops from Dayton to 27 airports, California to Boston to Florida, plus eight more on its prop affiliate. USAir and successor US Airways kept Dayton as a focus-city. The airport was a hub for Emery Worldwide, a freight carrier.

In 1981 Emery Worldwide completed an air freight hub sortation facility next to Runway 6L–24R. Emery added to the facility until the early 1990s, making it one of the world's largest airfreight facilities at the time.

A $50 million renovation of the airport's terminal building, designed by Levin Porter Associates, was completed in 1989. A new two-lane access road was built.

In 1998 the airport started renovating the terminal building. The $25 million projects was completed in 2002. The renovations included energy-efficient climate control systems, lighting, windows and entry/exit doorways, a new paging system, and ceiling tiles and carpeting. The news, gift shops, and food and beverage concessionaires improved their leased areas in the terminal building.

In 2004, CNF (which had acquired Emery Worldwide in 1989) sold its Menlo Forwarding business to UPS, who operated the Menlo freight facility at Dayton as an air cargo hub and sorting center.

In June 2006, UPS ceased operations at the Menlo cargo facility, consolidating its cargo operation and sorting facility to its Louisville hub, and reducing cargo tonnage through the Dayton airport by 97% from its 2005 peak

On May 1, 2011 Air Canada Express ended flights to Toronto Pearson, the airport's only international destination, when the airline consolidated its service at Cincinnati/Northern Kentucky International Airport. Dayton now has no scheduled international flights.

On August 12, 2012 Southwest Airlines began serving Dayton with flights to Denver International Airport. This was expected to increase passenger traffic by at least 15 percent.

In 2013 Concourse D, built in 1978 and used by Piedmont Airlines and US Airways for their mini-hub operation until its closure in 1991, was demolished. Concourse C was renamed Concourse A.

In 2015 Southwest Airlines announced a reduction in flights from Dayton: nonstop flights to Baltimore, Denver, Orlando, and Tampa all ended April 11, 2016. This left one nonstop destination from Dayton via Southwest. Passenger traffic is down nearly 9% since 2014, along with aircraft departures down 8%. Fares from Dayton have continued to rise while neighboring airports are lowering fares with new low-cost carriers. Cincinnati/Northern Kentucky International Airport has drastically reduced fares since 2014 while also experiencing over 10% growth in passengers.

On November 19, 2015, Dayton officials announced that Allegiant Air would add service in April twice a week to Orlando and Tampa. Allegiant Air would become the only low-cost fare carrier at the airport and would fill the gap left by Southwest Airlines reduction in flights to Florida.

On January 4, 2017, Southwest announced that it would end its flights to Chicago Midway and move services to Cincinnati/Northern Kentucky International Airport, adding eight daily flights to and from Chicago Midway and Baltimore–Washington International Airport. Southwest's last day in Dayton was June 3, 2017.

In January 2025, PSA Airlines announced that it plans to move its corporate headquarters to Charlotte, North Carolina from Dayton by January 2026; most daily departures are from, and almost all training is in Charlotte. The new headquarters is to have 400 employees; all 350 Dayton headquarters staff have until the end of April 2025 to accept an invitation to move there. The airline will maintain a maintenance hangar and flight crew location in Dayton, with a total of 550 employees.

On February 3, 2025, Air Wisconsin, which at the time was operating regional jet services for American Airlines, released a statement that due to a shift in business operations, more than 200 employees would be laid off at the airport by the end of March or middle of April; 185 unionized employees would be temporarily laid off, while 20 management and salaried workers would be permanently laid off. American Airlines stated that the jet service provided by Air Wisconsin would be shifted to other regional carriers.

Today the airport covers 4,200 acres (17 km^{2}), and has 5.0 miles (8.0 km) of runway. It is served by six passenger airlines and has sixteen non-stop destinations. The airport has an estimated $1 billion economic impact on the Dayton area economy.

== Construction projects ==
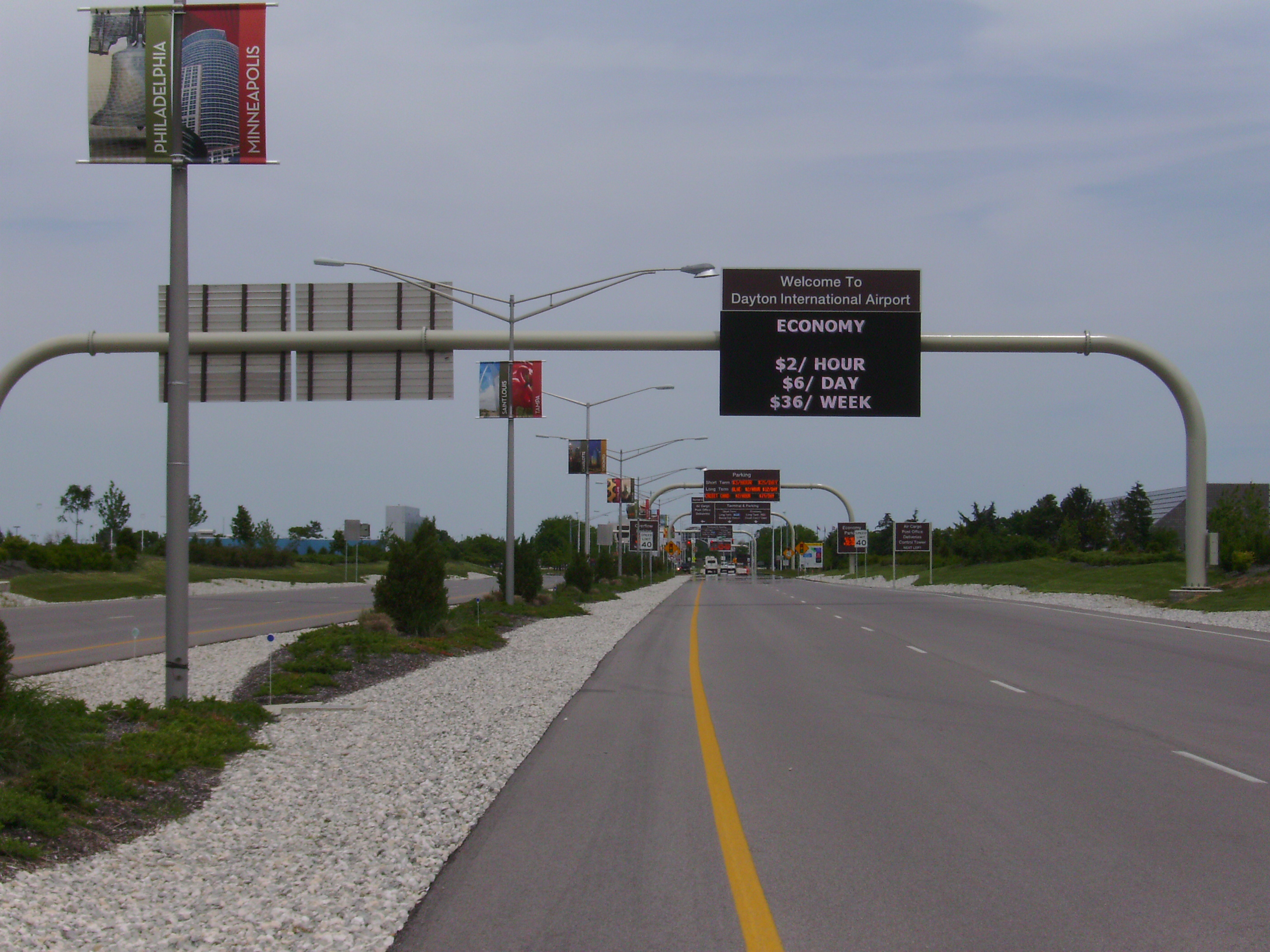
Access road from I-70 to terminal

In 2011, Dayton International Airport completed a new air traffic control tower. The tower is about 254 feet (77 m) high with a 12,000-square-foot (1,100 m^{2}) base building of office and operational space for FAA personnel. The switchover to the new tower was at midnight on June 4, 2011. Construction cost $21 million (the tower project's total cost was $30.6 million including equipment) and will eventually reduce the current staff of 38 controllers in Dayton to 12.

The airport broke ground in April 2009 for a new multi-level parking garage, which opened in the summer of 2010.

A parking lot improvement project began in October 2008 and provided for: (1) the construction of a new entrance/exit for a new "red" long term parking lot and economy parking lot; (2) reconfiguration and restriping of the existing credit card parking lot; (3) installation of revenue control equipment for the overflow parking lot; (4) upgrade of electrical and lighting within various parking lots. These improvements are to be completed in May 2009. The access road to the terminal has been undergoing several upgrades since October 2007 which involves the rehabilitation of Terminal Drive pavement, drainage system upgrades, installation of underground utilities and erection of new signage and other related roadway improvements.

The airport began a multi-year project in October 2006 to the perimeter roadway network to provide access around the airfield and to enhance safety by eliminating vehicle crossing of runways and taxiways. The project was completed in November 2009.

In June 2009, the airport completed a project to enhance safety by improving the 06R/24L runway safety area. Runway 6R pavement was extended by 285 feet (87 m) to connect to the taxiway pavement. In addition, a high-pressure gas transmission main and an 8-inch (200 mm) service main were relocated from under the footprint of the runway extension. The installation of wildlife fencing, completed in May 2009, enhances airport safety by reducing the movement of wild animals on the airfield.

In January 2018 the airport began another expansion focusing on the end of the airport with the ticketing counters and the parking garage. This work was completed in August 2018.

== Facilities ==
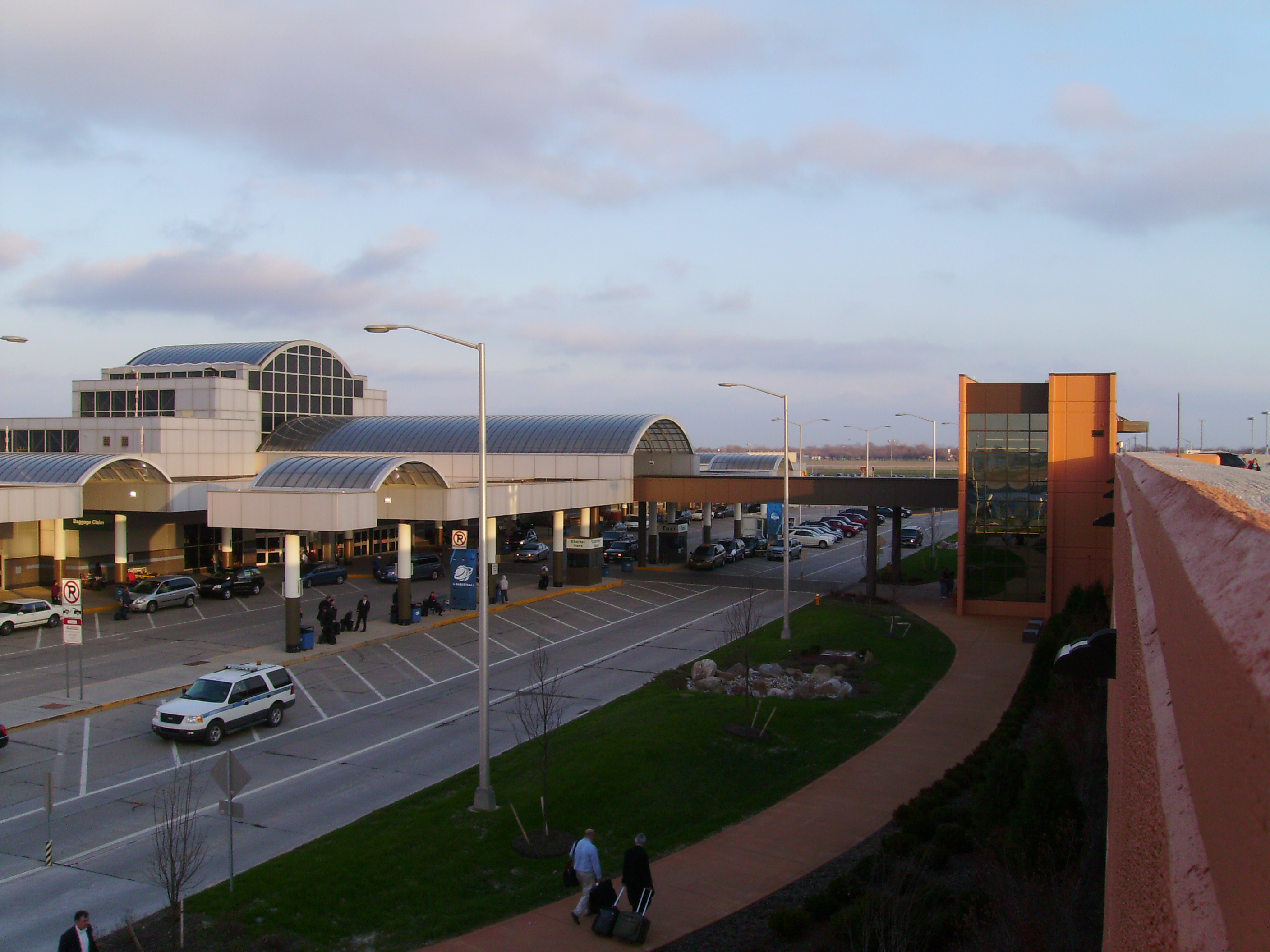
Terminal building

Dayton International Airport covers 4,200 acres (1,700 ha) and has three paved runways:

- 06L/24R: 10,901 ft (3,323 m) × 150 ft (46 m), asphalt/concrete
- 06R/24L: 7,285 ft (2,220 m) × 150 ft (46 m), concrete
- 18/36: 8,502 ft (2,591 m) × 150 ft (46 m), asphalt/concrete

There are thirteen instrument approach procedures into the airport: six instrument landing system (ILS) approaches, six Global Positioning System approaches (GPS)m and one non-directional beacon (NDB) approach. Runways with an ILS are 6L, 24R, 24L and 18; 6L has capabilities for CAT II and III ILS procedures. GPS approaches are set up on each runway. Runway 6R is the only runway with an NDB approach.

The terminal has two concourses: Concourse A has 12 jet bridges, and Concourse B has 8.

The airport has multiple fixed-base operators that offer fuel – both avgas and jet fuel – and other services such as general maintenance, aircraft parking, conference rooms, crew lounges, snooze rooms, showers, courtesy transportation, and more.

=== Traffic ===
In 2018 the airport had an average of 141 aircraft operations per day totaling in 51,445 operations: 24% general aviation, 42% air taxi, 33% scheduled airline, and <1% military.

In 2012 the airport reported 102,700 departures and about 98,200 in 2013.

=== Ground transportation and rentals ===
Taxicab service is available at curbside. Liberty Cab, Dayton Checker Cab, All America Taxi, Dayton Express Company, Diamond Taxi, Petra Cab, Charter Vans Inc. and Skyair, Inc. all provide ground transportation throughout the Dayton metro area. There are also several rental car companies serving the airport. On August 11, 2013, the Greater Dayton Regional Transit Authority began offering public transportation service to and from downtown Dayton. With the exception of a few unsuccessful routes in the past, the airport was not served by local public transportation prior to this date, which made it the second busiest airport in the continental United States lacking public transportation options. As of February 2019, Route 43 serves the airport seven to eight times per day on weekdays, six times on Saturdays, and three times on Sundays.

=== Amenities ===
Restaurants include MVP Bar and Grill, 12th Fairway Bar and Grill, Dunkin' Donuts, The Great American Bagel Bakery, and Max & Erma's. Several convenience shops and news stands are also located within the airport.

There were two Starbucks locations in the terminal, but they closed due to COVID-19 and will not reopen. The Heritage Booksellers has also closed and been converted to a temporary seating area pending new construction at the airport.

The airport has several Fuel Rod charging stations along with a new Cash to Card machine to pay for checked luggage at airline ticket counters.

== Airlines and destinations ==
=== Passenger ===
Airlines	Destinations
Allegiant Air	Seasonal: Myrtle Beach, Orlando/Sanford, Punta Gorda (FL), St. Petersburg/Clearwater
American Eagle	Charlotte, Chicago–O'Hare, Dallas/Fort Worth, Philadelphia, Washington–National
Breeze Airways	Fort Lauderdale, Fort Myers, Raleigh/Durham
Delta Air Lines	Atlanta
Delta Connection	Atlanta
United Airlines	Seasonal: Chicago–O'Hare, Denver
United Express	Chicago–O'Hare, Denver, Washington–Dulles

Passenger destinations map
Domestic destinations from Dayton International Airport
Red = Year-round destination
Green = Seasonal destination
Blue = Future destination

The Dayton International Airport once ranked among the nation's busiest air freight facilities and was the Midwestern hub for Emery Worldwide, a CF company. Emery, which was then operating under the name Menlo Worldwide Forwarding, was acquired by United Parcel Service (UPS) at the end of 2004. UPS closed the facility on June 30, 2006, moving operations to Worldport at Louisville International Airport.

== Statistics ==
For the 12-month period ending December 31, 2021, the airport had 41,200 aircraft operations, an average of 113 per day. This was 35% general aviation, 32% air taxi, 31% commercial, and 2% military. For the same time period, 34 aircraft were based at the airport: 13 single-engine and 10 multi-engine airplanes as well as 11 jets.

Passenger enplanement numbers at Dayton
Year	Passengers	Change
2003	1,315,106	—
2004	1,447,941	▲10.1%
2005	1,222,263	▼-15.6%
2006	1,306,454	▲6.9%
2007	1,427,630	▲9.3%
2008	1,465,480	▲2.7%
2009	1,253,782	▼-14.4%
2010	1,264,650	▲0.9%
2011	1,269,106	▲0.4%
2012	1,304,313	▲2.8%
2013	1,253,287	▼-3.9%
2014	1,143,724	▼-8.7%
2015	1,072,620	▼-6.2%
2016	1,035,263	▼-3.5%
2017	950,620	▼-8.2%
2018	906,003	▼-4.7%
2019	892,414	▼-1.5%
2020	337,517	▼-62.2%
2021	538,420	▲59.5%
2022	584,487	▲8.6%
2023	621,433	▲6.3%
2024	645,930	▲3.9%
2025	657,005	▲1.7%

Cargo throughput at Dayton

Year	Cargo (tons)	Change
2003	360,796.26	—
2004	369,437.91	▲2.4%
2005	370,510.27	▲0.3%
2006	166,613.50	▼-55.0%
2007	10,487.41	▼-93.7%
2008	9,501.95	▼-9.4%
2009	10,387.54	▲9.3%
2010	8,092.88	▼-22.1%
2011	8,597.20	▲6.2%
2012	10,068.94	▲17.1%
2013	7,818.79	▼-22.3%
2014	9,132.61	▲16.8%
2015	8,542.09	▼-6.5%
2016	8,492.23	▼-0.6%
2017	8,167.48	▼-3.8%
2018	8,035.22	▼-1.6%
2019	8,198.65	▲2.0%
2020	7,258.12	▼-11.5%
2021	7,828.73	▲7.8%
2022	7,298.84	▼-6.8%
2023	7,320.90	▲0.3%
2024	7,421.27	▲1.4%
2025	7,416.92	▼-0.1%

Busiest domestic routes from DAY (August 2025 – July 2026)
Rank	Airport	Passengers	Top carriers
1	Chicago–O'Hare, Illinois	143,550	American, United
2	Atlanta, Georgia	129,570	Delta
3	Dallas/Fort Worth, Texas	82,470	American
4	Charlotte, North Carolina	77,000	American
5	Washington-National, DC	43,820	American
6	Washington–Dulles, D.C.	38,490	United
7	Denver, Colorado	38,040	United
8	St. Petersburg/Clearwater, Florida	16,030	Allegiant
9	Philadelphia, Pennsylvania	15,730	American
10	Punta Gorda, Florida	14,810	Allegiant

== In popular media ==
In the 2008 film Eagle Eye, the two main characters are told to take a bus to the Dayton International Airport. The airport's name was mentioned several other times in the movie, even though there are no actual screen shots at the Dayton International Airport in the making of the movie. The actual airport scenes were shot at the Los Angeles International Airport.

== Accidents and incidents ==
- On March 9, 1967, TWA Flight 553, a McDonnell Douglas DC-9-15 jet airliner operated by Trans World Airlines, was en route to Dayton when it collided with a Beechcraft Baron over Urbana, Ohio. Visual flight rules (VFR) were in effect at the time of the accident. However, the uncontrolled VFR traffic around Dayton airspace contributed to, also with high rate of descent of the DC-9 prompted, the Federal Aviation Administration's decision to create Terminal Control Areas (either called Class B airspace and Class C airspace) coordination. All 25 passengers and crew of the DC-9 and the sole occupant of the Beechcraft were killed.
- On January 12, 1989, a Hawker Siddeley HS 748 operated by Bradley Air Services, bound for Montréal-Dorval International Airport, crashed approximately 1.2 mi (2 km) north of the airport after colliding with trees due to improper instrument flight rule (IFR) procedures by the first officer. Both occupants were killed.
- On April 8, 1992, a McDonnell Douglas DC-9 was damaged during pushback at Dayton International Airport. The left side nose wheel was damaged when the two bar failed, damaging the tire rim. The probable cause of the accident was found to be an inadvertent tire overinflation by a mechanic. A contributing factor was the failure of the mechanic's company to make low pressure regulators available to their mechanics during normal work hours.
- On September 13, 2006, a Piper PA-34 Seneca experienced a wheels up landing at Dayton International Airport. The probable cause of the crash was found to be the pilot's inadvertent wheels up landing.
- On July 28, 2007 an aircraft performing a loop over the airport at the Vectren Dayton Air Show slammed into the runway when attempting to finish the maneuver. The pilot, Jim LeRoy, was killed in the crash. The probable cause of the accident was found to be the pilot's failure to maintain clearance from terrain during an aerobatic maneuver.
- On March 30, 2011, a Boeing 737-300 operated by Northern Air Cargo was substantially damaged during departure from Dayton International Airport. The aircraft was departing Dayton on a positioning flight. On departure, an unsecured pallet jack in the cargo hold of the empty airplane hit the fuselage frame structure, fracturing a structural frame. The airlines Vice President for Operations said that although both pilots looked in the cargo hold of the airplane before departure, neither noticed the unsecured pallet jack. The probable cause of the accident was found to be the flightcrew's inadequate preflight inspection, resulting in in-flight structural damage to the airplane's fuselage from an unsecured pallet jack that was located in the airplane's empty cargo hold. The aircraft was subsequently flown to Tucson, Arizona for repairs.
- On June 20, 2013, a Piper PA-30 Twin Comanche crashed just after takeoff from Dayton. The pilot reported he had found a small amount of water in the right main inboard fuel tank during his preflight checks; no water was found in the other fuel tanks. Upon reexamination of the right fuel tank, no more water was found. After startup, the right engine stopped; though the pilot restarted the engine, he had to run it at slightly higher RPM during warmup. No problems were noted during engine runup or taxi. The departure roll felt "sluggish." The aircraft started to drift right, and the pilot was unable to correct the drift with rudder, so he reduced the throttles back to idle. The pilot elected to conduct a forced landing on a closed taxiway, so he added power to make it to the taxiway; however, the airplane landed short of the taxiway and impacted a bump in the terrain. The cause of the loss of control could not be determined because postaccident examinations of the aircraft did not reveal any anomalies that would have precluded normal operation.
- On June 22, 2013, a Boeing-Stearman Model 75 stunt plane carrying wing walker Jane Wicker crashed at the Vectren Dayton Air Show, killing both Wicker and pilot Charlie Schwenker. The airplane completed a "tear drop" style turn as the wing walker positioned herself on the lower left wing. The airplane then rolled left to fly inverted. While flying from the southwest to the northeast in front of the spectators, the airplane's nose pitched slightly above the horizon. The airplane then abruptly rolled to the right and impacted terrain in a left wing low attitude. A post impact fire ensued and consumed a majority of the right wing and forward portion of the fuselage. The probable cause of the crash was found to be the pilot's controlled flight into terrain; contributing to the accident was a modified airshow maneuver that placed the aircraft at low altitude and airspeed and out of position within the performance area.
- On May 29, 2014, a Cessna 201 with one crew member on board landed with the landing gear retracted. The pilot was not hurt. The incident was ruled to be caused by pilot error.
- On March 19, 2017, a McDonnell Douglas MD-83 operated by Allegiant Air experienced an engine fire during approach into Dayton International Airport. The aircraft landed safely. The probable cause of the fire was found to be an uncontained generator failure.
- On June 23, 2017, the day before an air show, a United States Air Force Thunderbirds F-16D jet, not scheduled to perform, was taxiing to a staging area after a familiarization flight, when witnesses reported a gust of wind flipped the aircraft onto its top in a grassy area next to the taxiway. Both the pilot and a team crew member were trapped in the airplane for two hours; the pilot suffered only minor injuries while the crew member had no visible injuries. The Thunderbirds canceled their scheduled performances for both days of the air show.
- On October 5, 2022, a Bombardier CRJ200 operated by Air Wisconsin for United Express slid off the runway while landing at Dayton. There were no injuries.

== See also ==
- Dayton-Wright Brothers Airport, a municipal airport south of the city in Miami Township, also owned and operated by the City of Dayton
- List of airports in Ohio
- List of enclaves and exclaves in Montgomery County, Ohio
- Ohio World War II Army Airfields
- Wright-Patterson Air Force Base
