= Toledo–Lucas County Port Authority =

Port authority of Toledo, Ohio

The Toledo–Lucas County Port Authority is a port authority financing and/or operating air, rail, trucking, and port facilities, as well as supporting and funding economic development activities in Lucas County, located in northwest Ohio and bordering on southeast Michigan.

== Mission ==
The Port Authority's mission is to: "assure that the Toledo area's water, air, rail, and surface transportation assets are developed and operated in a cohesive, coordinated and safe manner in order to provide maximum efficiencies and benefits to shippers, receivers, and passengers; to assure optimum business growth, technology development, investment, job retention and improvement in quality of life."

== Transportation facilities ==
=== Airports ===
The Port Authority operates two airports. Toledo Express Airport is the region's commercial aviation hub, with large air cargo facilities as well as airline service. Toledo Executive Airport was the commercial aviation field until about 1955 and now serves air charter, air cargo, corporate aviation, and general aviation operations.

=== Rail terminals ===
The Dr. Martin Luther King, Jr. Plaza serves up to 100,000 Amtrak rail passengers each year, making it Ohio's busiest passenger rail hub. In 1996, the Port Authority spent $8.5 million renovating the facility and it now serves as an intermodal train and bus terminal with office space above. Additionally, five freight railroads (Ann Arbor Railroad, Canadian National Railway, CSX Transportation, Norfolk Southern Railway, and Wheeling and Lake Erie Railway) move freight through the region. With several railyards loading petroleum products, automotive parts, completed automobiles, bulk and break-bulk cargo, and food products, Toledo ranks as one of the top five rail hubs in the U.S.

=== Trucking terminals ===
43% of U.S. industrial markets and 47% of Canadian industrial markets lie within 500 miles of Toledo. Due to its location and the development of the Interstate highway system, nearly 100 local freight carriers have facilities in Northwest Ohio. Port Authority facilities such as Toledo Express Airport and the Port of Toledo provide direct access to major highways including Interstate 75 and the Ohio Turnpike (Interstate 80/90), as well as U.S. 24 which provides direct access to Indianapolis via Fort Wayne, Indiana.

=== Port of Toledo ===
The Port of Toledo is a large Great Lakes port located at the western end of Lake Erie. It provides intermodal access to rail and trucking resources, as well as Big Lucas and Little Lucas, two of the largest cranes of any port on the Great Lakes.^{,}

== Economic development ==
=== Development financing ===
The Port Authority provides business financing to local development projects. According to the Port Authority, it has funded more than 225 economic development projects representing a total investment of more than $1.3 billion and resulting in the creation and retention of more than 13,000 jobs. It provides the following financing options:

- Fixed-interest-rate revenue bonds provide smaller companies access to capital markets as if they were BBB- investment-grade companies. It may provide:
  - Financing for projects from $1 million to $8 million
  - Fixed interest rates for full term of the bonds
  - Typically 90% financing and 10% equity
  - 20-year financing for land and buildings
  - 7- or 10-year financing for equipment
  - Tax exempt bonds for manufacturing, non-profit 501(c)(3), and governmental operations
  - Taxable bonds for all other projects
- Off-balance-sheet transactions provide large, publicly traded companies and certain non-profit organizations with significant benefits. Neither the asset nor the liability associated with the project appears on their balance sheet. The Port Authority owns the facility and leases it. The Financial Accounting Standards Board has strengthened the conditions needed to be met to keep a lease off-balance-sheet, and Port Authority transactions are structured to meet those new requirements. The Port Authority has completed 16 off-balance-sheet transactions for companies such as BAX Global, Owens Corning, HCR Manor Care, and Brush Wellman. Such transactions remain a viable option for certain entities. Benefits include:
  - Possible 100% financing
  - Lower cost of construction
  - Flexible options to purchase or extend lease
  - Governmental, Operating, and Financing Leases available
- Infrastructure Financing helps developers, governmental entities and other organizations finance public infrastructure such as streets, utilities, and public parking facilities. Mixed-use developments can tap tax increment financing or special assessments to provide debt service payments. The Port Authority has provided $75 million in tax exempt bond financing for infrastructure for Crocker Park, a mixed use facility in Westlake, Ohio. Other benefits include:
  - Possibility of 100% financing
  - Lower cost of construction
  - Fixed interest rate, tax exempt financing
  - Terms of up to 32 years
- Conduit Revenue Bond financing offers a company the option of variable interest rates. Depending upon the borrower, these bonds may be backed 100% by a Letter of Credit. The Port Authority acts as a "conduit" for the issuance of such bonds. Past conduit transactions include the Toledo Museum of Art, Cargill, DaimlerChrysler, and St. Francis de Sales High School.
- Ohio 166 Regional Loan Program provides a low interest rate program for financing land, building, and equipment for projects in Lucas, Wood, Fulton, Henry, Ottawa, Sandusky, Williams, Defiance, Seneca, and Erie Counties. It offers:
  - Up to 40% of project costs for manufacturing, manufacturing-related, distribution, and research and development businesses
  - Loans of up to $350,000, based on about $35,000 for each job created or retained.
  - A term of five to 15 years
  - Current fixed interest rate of 4%.
- Small Business Administration 504 loan program may provide fixed asset funding for a for-profit business with a net worth of not more than $7 million and net after-tax profit of not more than $2.5 million. A typical transaction consists of 50% bank financing; 40% SBA; and 10% equity. The SBA takes a second collateral position. This program is available from the Port Authority throughout Ohio and Southern Michigan. Benefits include:
  - Up to 40% of project costs for any manufacturing, distribution, or commercial operation.
  - Maximum loan of $1 million; up to $1.3 million if the projects meets certain specific federal government policy objectives
  - Term of either 10 or 20 years
  - Fixed interest rate at or slightly below market rate.

Revenue Bond Territory is not limited to the Port Authority taxing jurisdiction, but includes any county in the State of Ohio.

=== Land development ===
The Port Authority acquires and disposes of real property to facilitate the growth and development of its transportation assets. It also leases parcels it owns in order to promote economic development. The Port Authority also administers a Foreign Trade Zone, an area physically located in the United States, but considered outside the jurisdiction of U.S. Customs duties. Because of the zone's unique trade designation, goods can be stored, exhibited, repackaged, manipulated, manufactured, or mixed with other foreign/domestic merchandise within the zone — duty-free. Duty is paid only when goods are moved out of the FTZ into the United States.
