= Pro Air =

Low-cost airline of the United States (1997–2000)

IATA	ICAO	Call sign
XL; P9	PRH	PROHAWK
- Founded: July 1997; 29 years ago
- Ceased operations: September 18, 2000; 25 years ago
- Hubs: Detroit City Airport
- Fleet size: 4
- Destinations: 13
- Headquarters: Lower Queen Anne, Seattle, Washington, United States
- Key people: Craig Belmondo
- Founder: Kevin Stamper
- Website: Proair.com

Pro Air was a low-cost airline in the United States founded by Kevin Stamper in July 1997 to serve the centrally located Detroit City Airport in Detroit, Michigan. Its headquarters were in the Lower Queen Anne area of Seattle, Washington.

== History ==
Pro Air charged extremely low fares and experienced high passenger load factors on most of its flights; however, many of its flights were delayed with mechanical and crew problems.

When Pro Air 737s underwent "C" maintenance checks, Spirit Airlines, Pan Am Clipper Connection, and Casino Express operated its flights via charters. A Pan Am Boeing 727 collapsed the fence at the end of runway 33 in at Detroit City Airport (DET) due to having to significantly increase engine thrust because of the short runway takeoff length of 5000 ft.

Pro Air required its initial employees to go door-to-door in the metropolitan Detroit area and pass out flyers promoting the airline. The airline's first flight crew base was located in Indianapolis. Most employees moved to the Detroit area when the Detroit City Airport hub operation commenced in 1998.

Pro Air was in direct competition with Northwest Airlines (which operated a hub at the larger Detroit Metropolitan Wayne County Airport (DTW)) on many of its routes. The airline originally started with a single fare for all passengers, but about 18 months afterwards it implemented tiered fares with advance purchase requirements. It also served full meals in coach (in addition to first class) but scrapped the program after realizing that the cost of the meal accounted for, on average, 10% of the fare that the customer paid. It was known for its signature "hot meal" service (even on the 35 minute DET-MDW route) in First Class along with premium alcoholic beverage service, and was the only airline to charge a mere $2 for beer and wine in Economy class (mixed drinks were $3).

Pro Air pioneered one of the lowest fares on the DET-LGA-DET route at $59 each way (which would later be topped by Spirit Airlines’ $0.01 fares). "Founder's Fares" were offered for returning passengers as a "thank you" promotion. Detroit-area vehicle manufacturers General Motors and Chrysler also had programs in place for their employees and families who flew on Pro Air with discounted fares of $30 each way being available.

On July 2, 2000, a Pro Air pilot taxied a plane into a luggage conveyor belt at Orlando International Airport. No one was hurt, but the plane's left wing was so severely damaged that the Federal Aviation Administration deemed the incident an accident. An investigation revealed that the pilot had ignored a number of signals before colliding with the belt. After a subsequent investigation revealed numerous other safety violations, the FAA grounded Pro Air on September 18, 2000. Pro Air filed for Chapter 11 bankruptcy soon afterward, and sought permission to resume operations pending NTSB review. However, the NTSB rejected Pro Air's bid to return to the skies on September 28. Its aircraft were quickly repossessed by the lessor soon afterward.

== Destinations ==
During its existence, Pro Air flew to the following destinations:

- Florida
  - Fort Myers (Southwest Florida International Airport) – RSW
  - Orlando (Orlando International Airport) – MCO
  - Tampa (Tampa International Airport) – TPA
- Georgia
  - Atlanta (Hartsfield–Jackson Atlanta International Airport) – ATL
- Illinois
  - Chicago (Chicago Midway International Airport) – MDW
- Indiana
  - Indianapolis (Indianapolis International Airport) – IND
- Maryland
  - Baltimore (Baltimore/Washington International Thurgood Marshall Airport) – BWI
- Michigan
  - Detroit (Detroit City Airport) – DET – Hub
- New Jersey
  - Newark (Newark Liberty International Airport) – EWR
- New York
  - New York City (LaGuardia Airport) – LGA
- Pennsylvania
  - Philadelphia (Philadelphia International Airport) – PHL
- Washington
  - Seattle/Tacoma (Seattle–Tacoma International Airport) – SEA
- Wisconsin
  - Milwaukee (Milwaukee Mitchell International Airport) – MKE

In 1998, Pro Air also operated non-stop flights between Indianapolis and two Florida destinations: Fort Myers and Orlando. By early 2000, it had ceased serving Fort Myers, Milwaukee and Tampa. Due to Detroit City's short runways limiting the amount of fuel the aircraft could carry on takeoff, flights to Seattle and Florida stopped in Chicago and Atlanta, respectively. Passengers could purchase tickets for just the Chicago-Seattle or Atlanta-Florida portions of the flights. According to its route map, in early 2000 Pro Air was serving ten U.S. destinations: Atlanta (ATL), Baltimore (BWI), Chicago–Midway (MDW) , Detroit–City (DET), Indianapolis (IND), New York-Newark (EWR), New York–LaGuardia (LGA), Orlando (MCO), Philadelphia (PHL), and Seattle (SEA).

== Fleet ==
The company operated a small fleet, starting with two Boeing 737-400 jetliners, and then expanding to three Boeing 737-400 and one Boeing 737-300 aircraft. The 737-400 had a seating configuration of 138 in coach and eight in first class, with slightly increased legroom in both classes when compared to seating offered by major U.S. airlines. Pro Air had McDonnell Douglas MD-90 jetliners on order; however, the airline ceased operations down before the first aircraft could be delivered, but not before it was painted. Just before Pro Air's demise, General Motors (GM) had been in talks to offer their three corporate-configured Saab 2000 turboprop aircraft to the airline, indicating that they would choose which routes and frequencies the aircraft would operate on as Pro Air Express flights; however, the deal was never consummated due to the airline ceasing operations, as well as the abandonment of Detroit City Airport.

Aircraft in fleet:

- Boeing 737-300
- Boeing 737-400
- McDonnell Douglas MD-90 (ordered but not operated prior to Pro Air's shut down of all flights)

Pro Air also chartered aircraft from other airlines as demand warranted including Boeing 727-200 jetliners operated by Pan Am.

== See also ==
- List of defunct airlines of the United States
