= Dayton Air Show =

Annual airshow in Vandalia, Ohio

CenterPoint Energy Dayton Air Show
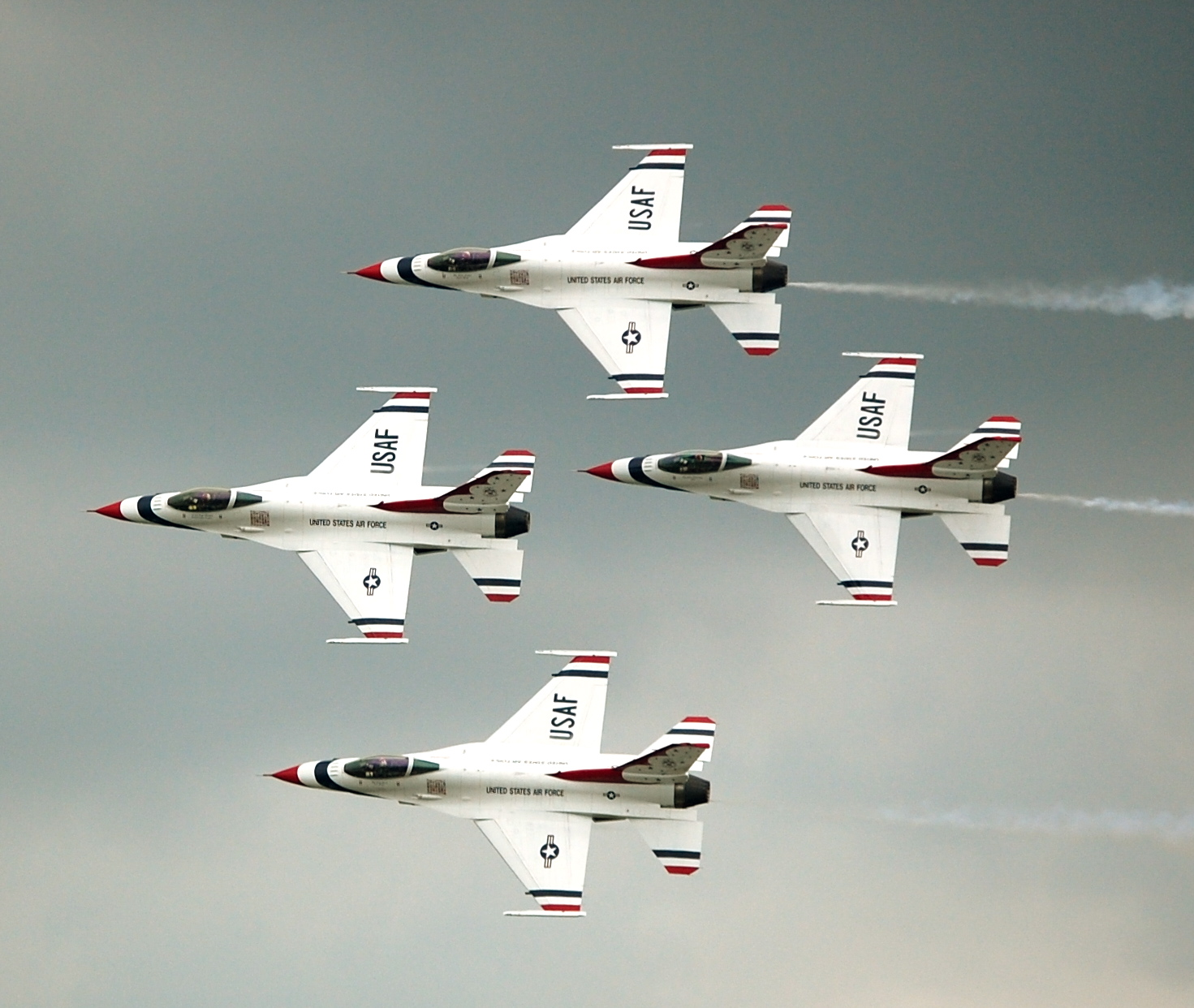
- United States Air Force Thunderbirds at the 2009 Dayton Air Show
- Status: Active
- Genre: Air show
- Dates: June / July
- Frequency: Annually
- Venue: Dayton International Airport
- Location: Vandalia, Ohio
- Coordinates: 39°54′08″N 084°13′10″W
- Country: United States
- Attendance: 80,000 (2010)
- Major events: Static displays Aerobatic displays
- Website: www.daytonairshow.com

The CenterPoint Energy Dayton Air Show is an annual event held at the Dayton International Airport in Vandalia, Ohio, eight miles north of Dayton, Ohio. From 2013 to 2019, the show has been held on a weekend in late June. Prior to 2013, and again starting in 2021, it was held in mid-July each year. The history of this flight exhibition dates back to 1910 and the Wright Company. Dayton is the hometown of the Wright brothers and is where Orville and Wilbur built their first powered aircraft. The show's main sponsor is CenterPoint Energy.

It is estimated that the 2010 Dayton Air Show attracted nearly 80,000 people and had a $5 million impact on the Dayton region's local economy. The 2012 show is estimated to have a $3 million impact on Dayton's economy.

There was no air show in 2020 due to the COVID-19 pandemic, but the show returned in July 2021.

== History ==
The Dayton Air Fair began in 1975 after the "General Aviation Days" held at the Montgomery County Airport and a one-off open house at Wright-Patterson Air Force Base the year before were combined and relocated to Dayton Municipal Airport. The name of the event was changed to Dayton International Airshow and Trade Exposition in 1986, shortened to Dayton Air and Trade Show for 1988 and revised to United States Air and Trade Show in 1990.

Vectren, an energy company, held naming rights for the show from 2001 through 2019, when it was purchased and the title sponsor became CenterPoint Energy starting in 2021.

== US Air, Trade & Technology Conference and Exposition ==
The US Air Trade and Technology Conference and Exposition (USATT) was initiated by Congressman Mike Turner to bring together contractors, subcontractors, governments and others to discuss issues pertaining to the aerospace industry. The program focuses on topics such as UAVs, human performance, sensors, and alternative fuels. Although the USATT takes place during the Dayton Air Show, it is not open to the public.

== Accidents and fatalities ==
An accident during a stunt flight resulted in the death of Jim LeRoy, who was pronounced dead on 28 July 2007, in a military MEDEVAC helicopter while in transit to Miami Valley Hospital in Dayton, Ohio. The crash was attributed to pilot error.

On 22 June 2013, an airplane carrying wing walker Jane Wicker crashed at the air show, killing both Wicker and pilot Charlie Schwenker.

On 23 June 2017, the day before the air show, a General Dynamics F-16 Fighting Falcon jet of the United States Air Force Thunderbirds display team, had a mishap on landing. The plane ended up sliding off the runway and rolling upside down. Both the pilot and a team crew member were trapped in the airplane for one hour; the pilot suffered major injuries while the crew member had no visible injuries. The Thunderbirds canceled their scheduled performances for both days of the air show.

== Effect of weather on attendance ==
Unusually high temperatures led to greatly decreased attendance for the 2012 show. As such, it was announced in October of that year that the 2013 show would be moved from July to June. That change continued through 2016 (18-19 June 2016). The previous year's air show had lost attendance as well due to weather, however, the loss was due to heavy rains, which also forced the temporary grounding of some acts. An estimated 51,000 spectators attended the 2016 show, a large increase from the 40,000 of the previous year. This was despite the absence of a scheduled headliner act, the Blue Angels, following that group's temporary grounding after one of its pilots died in a crash on June 2.
