= Northcoast Executive Airlines =

Regional commuter airline

IATA	ICAO	Call sign
5N	NCE	TOP HAT
- Founded: February 1990; 36 years ago
- Ceased operations: January 29, 1991; 35 years ago (Chapter 7 Bankruptcy)
- Operating bases: Dayton General Airport
- Headquarters: Miamisburg, OH (Dayton, OH)
- Key people: Calvin Humphrey

Northcoast Executive Airlines was a regional commuter airline that operated in the Midwestern United States in the early 1990s. The airline served secondary airports in larger cities with Fairchild SA227 aircraft (from the Fairchild Swearingen Metroliner family).

In late 1990, the airline announced a move from Cleveland's Burke Lakefront to the much larger Cleveland Hopkins International Airport, but later rescinded its decision and returned to Burke. The conflicting announcements and schedule changes lead to confusion. The confusion, combined with a weak regional economy, may have hastened the end of the airline.

Northcoast Executive was headed by CEO Calvin Humphrey. The airline filed for Chapter 7 bankruptcy liquidation on January 29, 1991.

== Destinations ==
Northcoast Executive serviced:

- Illinois
  - Chicago (Midway Airport)
- Michigan
  - Detroit City Airport (since renamed Coleman A. Young International Airport)
  - Flint (Bishop International Airport)
- Ohio
  - Cleveland
    - Cleveland Burke Lakefront Airport
    - Cleveland Hopkins International Airport (briefly)
  - Dayton General Airport (since renamed Dayton-Wright Brothers Airport)

== Fleet ==
- Fairchild SA227-AC Metro III

== See also ==
- List of defunct airlines of the United States
