= Toledo Executive Airport =

Airport in Wood County, Ohio, USA

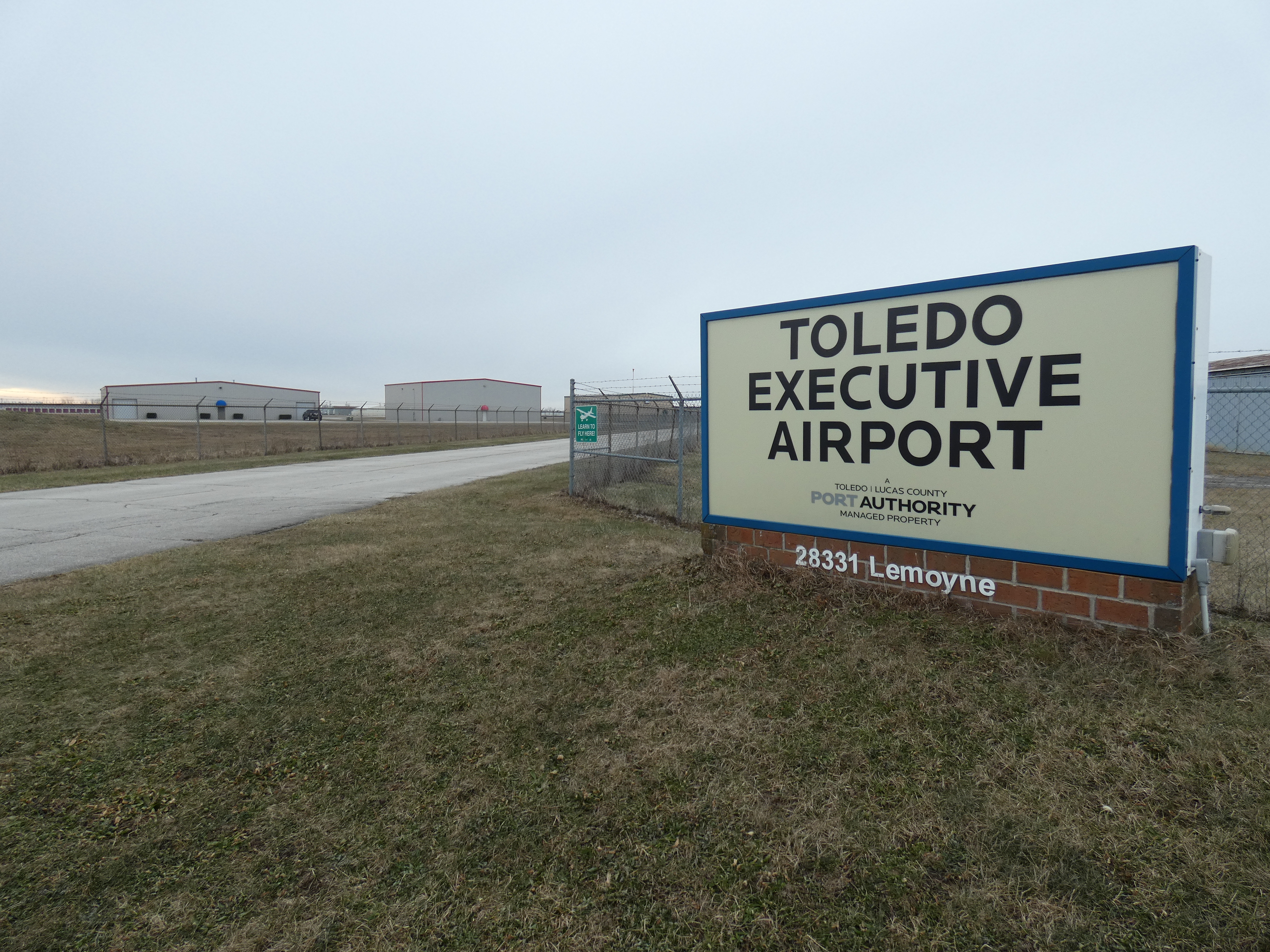
- IATA: TDZ; ICAO: KTDZ; FAA LID: TDZ

Summary
- Airport type: Public
- Owner: Toledo–Lucas County Port Authority
- Serves: Toledo, Ohio
- Location: Wood County, Ohio
- Elevation AMSL: 623 ft (190 m)
- Coordinates: 41°33′53″N 083°28′56″W
- Website: https://toledoexecutiveairport.com/

Map
- Location within Ohio Location within the United States

Runways
Direction	Length		Surface
Direction	ft	m	Surface
4/22	3,799	1,158	Asphalt
14/32	5,829	1,777	Asphalt

Statistics (2021)
- Aircraft operations: 90,700
- Based aircraft: 44
- Source: Federal Aviation Administration

Toledo Executive Airport (IATA: TDZ, ICAO: KTDZ, FAA LID: TDZ) is 7 miles southeast of Toledo, in Wood County, Ohio. It is an FAA-designated reliever to Toledo Express Airport (TOL), Toledo's primary airport.

== History ==
The airport was founded on June 22, 1927, with the establishment of the Toledo Airport Committee. $257,000 was raised in early 1928 to fund the airport in 33 1/2 hours, which is the time it took Charles Lindbergh to fly from New York City to Paris. 620 shares of stock were sold to 620 Toledo citizens. (Note: Other nearby early airports included: 215-acre airfield on Stickney Avenue, just north of Toledo.; Franklin Airport – 5035 Monroe Street in Toledo. It was closed on September 15, 1952.; National Airport – 165-acre airfield located at Telegraph and Alexis road in Toledo. It was sold in the early 1960s.)

A site was chosen based on proximity to an air route from Chicago to New York, and land was purchased in the spring of 1928, and was opened on June 3, 1928, under The Transcontinental Airport of Toledo, Inc.

The airport received a complete weather station, and the US Weather Bureau of Toledo operated at the airport until early 1955.

National Air Transport began service with passenger and air mail flights to Chicago and Cleveland, and a national record amount of mail was carried through the airport in 1929.

By 1931, National and three other airlines had merged, becoming United Airlines, and Toledo had become a stop on a transcontinental air route extending from San Francisco to New York.

During the Great Depression, The Transcontinental Airport of Toledo, Inc. would close due to inadequate construction began to crumble, driving away businesses. However, President Franklin D Roosevelt allocated $216,077 in Works Progress Administration funds for upgrades to the airport in 1936. The city of Toledo provided $52,000 in matching funds, which provided three paved runways.

The airport was purchased by the City of Toledo following the repairs and in 1937, the airport became a Class One port and the second-largest airfield east of the Rocky Mountains.

United Airlines paused service in 1938 when the airport's runways began to buckle, leaving the airport unused. Federal grants were provided in 1940 to rebuild the runways, and the airport reopened in 1941.

By 1948, the airport was known as Toledo Municipal Airport. A terminal building and air traffic control tower were built the same year. Funds were provided by the City of Toledo and the federal government.

Ultimately, neighboring developments prevented the airport from expanding its runways to meet the needs of increasingly larger commercial aircraft. When the larger Toledo Express Airport was built in 1954, Toledo Municipal became redundant, and it was ultimately abandoned. By the end of 1956, 47 acres (19 ha) had been sold to an electronics manufacturer called H. H. Buggie, Inc.

The field continued to degrade for over a decade while being used for fireworks displays and drag racing. General Aviation and business jets in the late 1960s and early 1970s brought the field back into use as an airport; private, business and charter flights continue to be the main activities. By late 1962, questions were being raised over the airport's value and whether it could be revitalized.

In 1966, Executive Aviation signed a fifteen-year lease and invested $250,000 in a new main hangar, 20 T-hangars, and a fuel facility. The airport was rededicated on 23 October 1967. Astro Aviation took over operations at the airport in 1970, and Crow Executive Air was founded in 1974.

In 1975, the airport was put under the control of the Toledo–Lucas County Port Authority. In 1977, it was renamed Metcalf Field in honor of Tommy Metcalf, Toledo's second commissioner of aviation. (Note: The Toledo Municipal Airport name had been causing confusion with Toledo Express Airport.)

In April 2007, a FedEx Boeing 727 landed at the airport to be decommissioned and provided to Owens Community College for ground-based training. The airport's name was changed to Toledo Executive Airport in 2010.

On June 5, 2010, an EF4 tornado passed along the south edge of the airport. Neighboring Lake High School and other structures were severely affected.

== Facilities and aircraft ==
=== Facilities ===
Toledo Executive Airport covers 450 acres (180 ha) and has two asphalt runways: 4/22 is 3,799 x 75 ft (1,158 x 23 m), and 14/32 is 5,829 x 100 ft (1,777 x 30 m). Air America Aviation Services provides fixed-base operations.

Blue Horizons Flying Club operates from this field.

EAA Chapter 582 operates from this field.

Air America Aerial Ads, LLC, operates from this field.

=== Aircraft ===
In the year ending July 29, 2021, the airport had 90,700 aircraft operations, an average of 248 per day: 78% general aviation, 22% air taxi, and <1% military.

As of July 2021, there were 44 aircraft based at the airport: 36 single-engine and 6 multi-engine airplanes, 1 jet, and 1 glider.

== Accidents and incidents ==
- On October 18, 2009, a Pietenpol Air Camper crashed while operating at the Toledo Executive Airport. The pilot was conducting takeoffs and landings in the airport's traffic pattern at the time of the accident. He added that he had been dealing with "moderate turbulence from thermals and the shifting winds" during the flight. During the accident landing, the pilot stated that the airplane drifted left of the runway centerline during the landing roundout. As the left main wheel touched down, a gust of wind from the right caused the airplane to depart the left side of the runway. The pilot avoided a ground loop but still clipped a runway light with the horizontal stabilizer. The probable cause of the accident was found to be the pilot's failure to maintain directional control during landing.
- On 1 July 2011, at 7:30 p.m., after takeoff from Toledo Executive Airport, an ultralight Couvillion S-17, N433GC, lost power. Upon returning to the ground, it collided with a fence at a construction site. It also struck a pile of gravel before coming to rest in a barn. There were no injuries reported.

== See also ==
- List of airports in Ohio
