= Air Transport International Flight 805 =

1992 aviation accident in Ohio

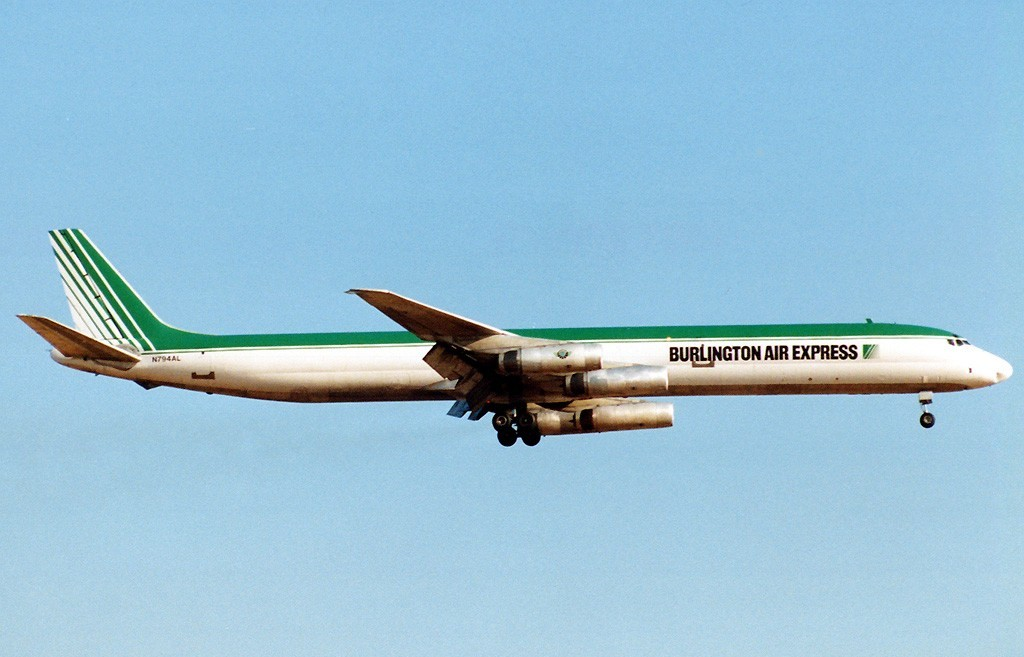
- N794AL, the aircraft involved in the accident, seen in 1991

Accident
- Date: February 15, 1992
- Summary: Crashed during go-around due to pilot error and spatial disorientation
- Site: Swanton, Ohio, (near Toledo Express Airport), United States; 41°37.95′N 83°48.07′W
- Total fatalities: 4
- Total injuries: 13

Aircraft
- Aircraft type: Douglas DC-8-63F
- Operator: Air Transport International on behalf of Burlington Air Express
- IATA flight No.: AT805
- ICAO flight No.: ATN805
- Call sign: AIR TRANSPORT 805
- Registration: N794AL
- Flight origin: Seattle–Tacoma International Airport, Seattle, Washington, United States
- Destination: Toledo Express Airport, Toledo, Ohio, United States
- Occupants: 4
- Passengers: 1
- Crew: 3
- Fatalities: 4
- Survivors: 0

Ground casualties
- Ground injuries: 13

Air Transport International Flight 805 was a regularly scheduled domestic cargo flight from Seattle to Toledo operated by Burlington Air Express. On February 15, 1992, the Douglas DC-8 operating the flight crashed during a second go-around attempt at Toledo Express Airport, killing all four people on board. The National Transportation Safety Board (NTSB) determined that the accident was caused by pilot error due to the aircraft's control not being maintained.

== Background ==
=== Aircraft ===
The aircraft involved was a Douglas DC-8-63F registered as N794AL, with serial number 45923 first flew in 1968. It was initially a passenger aircraft and was delivered to Scandinavian Airlines on August 16 the same year. It then operated for Icelandair, Thai Airways, and TransOcean Airways, before being converted into a freighter and sold to Burlington Air Express. It had logged 70084 airframe hours in 22804 takeoff and landing cycles and was powered by four Pratt & Whitney JT3D-7 turbofan engines.

==== Previous incident ====
On November 13, 1991, while operating a flight from Toledo to Los Angeles (for Flagship Express), the accident aircraft's cargo door opened after takeoff from Toledo. The aircraft (sustaining minor damage) was able to land safely, and the three crew members survived with no injuries. The failure of the cargo door had been caused by the flight engineer failing to verify that the door was closed properly. The flight crew was unaware of the improperly closed door as damaged wiring caused the door indicator light to go out despite the door itself not having been closed properly. In addition, the door had been improperly installed with weak locks.

=== Crew ===
In command was 59-year-old Captain Harry Baker, who had logged 16,382 flight hours, including 2,382 hours on the DC-8. The first officer was 37-year-old Tim Hupp who had logged 5,082 flight hours, with 3,135 of them on the DC-8 (1,148 hours as a flight engineer and 1,992 hours as a first officer). The flight engineer was 57-year-old Jose Montalbo, who had logged 21,697 flight hours, including 7,697 hours on the DC-8. Raman Patel, a pilot at Buffalo Airways, was also on board as a non-revenue passenger.

== Accident ==
Flight 805 departed from Seattle on-time at 21:45 Eastern Standard Time (EST). First officer Hupp was the pilot flying. The flight was uneventful until it approached Toledo. Flight 805 was cleared for an ILS approach to runway 07 with the controller advising the crew about light to moderate precipitation. At 03:02, Flight 805 was cleared to land, and captain Baker acknowledged the transmission. The cockpit voice recorder (CVR) then recorded the flight crew going over the landing checklist. After this however, captain Baker started complaining to first officer Hupp that he was flying too slow with the flaps not having been extended into the landing configuration. He even told him, "You're not even on the [expletive] localizer at all." In other words, the aircraft had failed to capture the localizer and was below the glide path, resulting in an unstable approach. Baker subsequently declared a go-around at 03:13.

When the approach controller asked Flight 805 on why they initiated go-around, captain Baker responded, "We lost the localizer close in there...couldn't position ourselves on final...we had the glidepath, but not the localizer." The approach controller gave Flight 805 a 100 degree heading for another approach.

During the second approach the aircraft managed to capture the localizer, with captain Baker advising first officer Hupp about the wind conditions. At 03:21, Flight 805 was again cleared to land on runway 07. However, the approach became destabilized again, with the ground proximity warning system (GPWS) sounding three "glideslope" warnings and three "sink rate" warnings. There were also three changes in power. At 03:24, Baker told Hupp that he was taking over control of the aircraft and initiated another go-around.

At 03:25, first officer Hupp reported the go-around to the tower controller and was instructed to climb and maintain 3,000 feet (910 m) and then turn left onto a 300 degree heading. However, the aircraft began to bank 80 degrees and pitch up 25 degrees. Captain Baker transferred control of the aircraft back to first officer Hupp and asked him if he had the control, to which he responded, "I got it." Hupp then attempted to raise the aircraft's nose and level the wings, but was unable to recover control. At 03:26 the aircraft crashed into the ground 3 miles (4.8 km; 2.6 nmi) away from runway 07. All four people on board were killed instantly, and the aircraft was destroyed. Parts of the aircraft landed in the backyard of a house. No one on the ground was killed, but thirteen people on the ground were injured; one person in the house that the debris landed near was injured by falling plaster caused by the force of the impact, and 12 firefighters were treated for smoke inhalation.

== Investigation ==
During the National Transportation Safety Board (NTSB) investigation both flight recorders were recovered. Investigators discovered that when captain Baker took control, he became spatially disoriented and accidentally caused the plane to enter an unrecoverable bank and attitude. The NTSB also focused on the aircraft's attitude indicators (ADI), human factors, the power changes by using the Flight Data Recorder (FDR), and the manner of first officer Hupp's approach.

Because of the aircraft's previous cargo door incident, the NTSB considered the possibility that the aircraft had once again experienced a cargo door opening mid-flight. Seven door latches were found; one of which had lost its latch pins on impact. If the cargo door had opened in mid-flight the CVR would suddenly record a loud sound of rushing air. Flight 805's CVR did not record this, nor the flight crew did bring up any abnormal sounds. The crew also didn't bring up the door warning light. Thus, the NTSB concluded that the cargo door had been functioning normally, did not open in mid-flight, and was not a factor in the accident.

The ADI malfunction was the most likely scenario, as the NTSB was unable to determine its readings at impact. However, only one ADI was recovered and had been severely damaged from the crash. The NTSB alluded to previous accidents which involved ADI malfunctions. The NTSB did believe that the first officer's ADI was functioning normally at the time of the accident because of his immediate response to captain Baker transferring control of the aircraft back to him, and properly executing the recovery attempt. The report stated:

Lastly, the basic control manipulations by the first officer during the recovery attempt were in general accordance with accepted procedures in that he attempted to roll the wings level and then began pulling the nose up. If he [the first officer] had been more aggressive with both sets of controls, he might have succeeded. A larger, more rapid aileron input would have leveled the wings faster; and a more aggressive pullout could have been within the operating envelope of the aircraft. Even if he had exceeded the approved g load for the DC-8, a large safety margin existed to preclude structural failure in extreme situations. Obviously, this situation called for extremely quick and aggressive control inputs.

— NTSB final report

In addition, the flight crew's interactions were not representing proper crew resource management (CRM). The NTSB was also unable to determine why the first officer caused the aircraft to destabilize on approach.

The NTSB released the final report on November 19, 1992, with the "probable cause" stating:

The National Transportation Safety Board determines that the probable cause of this accident was the failure of the flightcrew to properly recognize or recover in a timely manner from the unusual aircraft attitude that resulted from the captain's apparent spatial disorientation, resulting from physiological factors and/or a failed attitude director indicator.

— NTSB final report

The NTSB was unable to determine with absolute certainty if any of these aforementioned factors (except for the cargo door incident which had been ruled out) had caused or contributed to the accident. The NTSB could not determine the time that control of the aircraft was lost.

== Aftermath ==
The NTSB did not issue any recommendations following the accident.

== See also ==
- Air India Flight 855
- Korean Air Cargo Flight 8509
- List of accidents and incidents involving commercial aircraft
