= Jimmy Franklin =

American aviator

Jimmy Marshall Franklin (May 16, 1948 – July 10, 2005) was an American aerobatic pilot. He performed at airshows, both solo and as part of teams, for over 38 years until his death at an airshow in Moose Jaw. Born and raised in Lovington, New Mexico, Franklin learned to fly at age 8 and bought his first airplane (a UPF 7 Waco) at 19 and flew his first airshow the same year.

Franklin was the first pilot to receive the Art Scholl Memorial Showmanship award, and the only performer to win it twice.

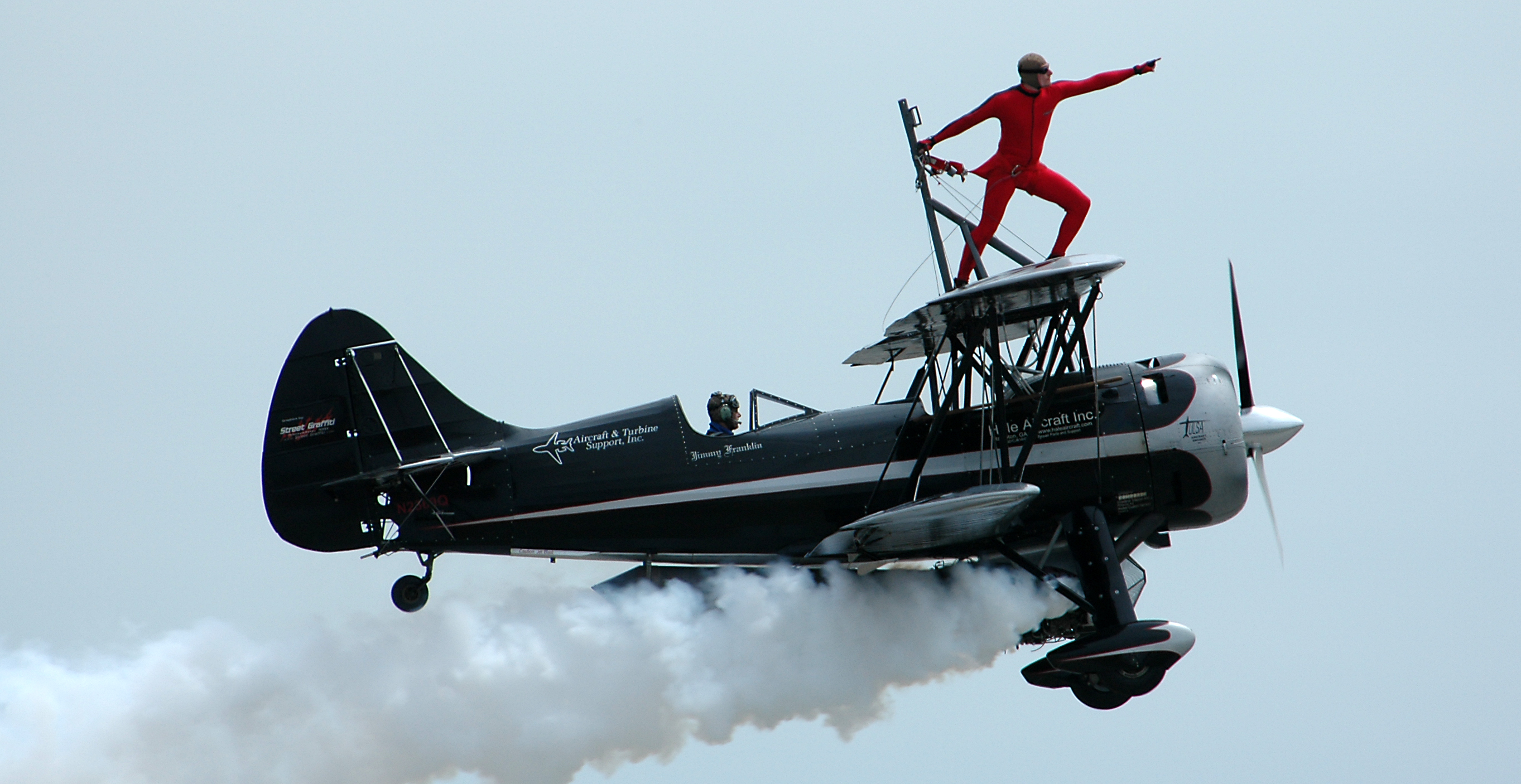
Jimmy Franklin in the Jet Waco with his son, Kyle, standing on the wing

== Biography ==
Jimmy Franklin was born May 16, 1948, in Lovington, NM. His father, Oliver (known as "Zip") would fly from the family's farm some 30 miles (48 km) to their ranch with the infant Franklin on his lap. When he was 12, Franklin dragged his father's airplane out of the hangar while the elder Franklin was away, and took it for his first solo flight. "I had buzzed all the neighbors," he later recalled.

Franklin obtained his private pilot's license at 17, followed by his commercial pilot's license at the age of 18. He purchased his first airplane, a Waco, when he was 19 and began performing his own routines at airshows.

He would continue to develop various routines, from single-plane aerobatic acts, to multi-plane dogfighting simulations, to more dangerous routines such as a plane-to-plane inflight baton pass. He perfected a ribbon grab pass where he would fly inverted and grab a ribbon with the tail of the aircraft. Once he picked up a ribbon that was suspended between two Coca-Cola bottles.

Franklin is the only airshow pilot to be "red flared" at EAA AirVenture Oshkosh—a signal from the airshow controllers that an unsafe act has been seen, commanding the pilot to immediately land. At the show in 1975, his debut there, he had been flying inverted for his ribbon-grab when the aircraft's tail made contact with the grass, resulting in the flare. The penalty meant he was barred from participating in airshows for nearly 3 years.

Franklin performed in the 1986 movie Three Amigos as the Tubman 601 pilot. He also appeared as an airshow pilot in the 1991 movie The Rocketeer along with Craig Hosking and real life race pilots Steve Hinton and Rick Brickert among others.

In the 1990s, he and Les Shockley, the inventor of the Shockwave jet truck, modified his Waco, attaching a General Electric J85 jet engine to the underside. It was in this aircraft that Franklin's son Kyle became the first person to wing-walk on a jet powered aircraft.

Franklin began performing with Jim LeRoy in 2001, where they would dogfight and perform mock attacks on Shockley's jet truck. In 2002 the pair and Bobby Younkin formed the X Team, which was popularly known as the Masters of Disaster after the name of their aerobatic routine.

On July 10, 2005, Franklin and Younkin collided in mid-air while performing their Masters of Disaster routine at the Saskatchewan Centennial Air Show in Moose Jaw. Both pilots were killed.

Franklin's son Kyle married Younkin's daughter Amanda in 2005. The two would continue in aerobatics with Kyle flying and Amanda wing-walking. On March 12, 2011, Kyle's Waco lost engine power and crashed during an airshow. Both were injured in the crash and subsequent fire, and Amanda died of her injuries on May 27.

== Awards received ==
- 1986: Art Scholl Memorial Showmanship Award (inaugural recipient)
- 1989: Bill Barber Award for Showmanship
- 1990: General Aviation News and Flyer "Reader's Choice" Award for Favorite Overall Performer
- 1996: General Aviation News and Flyer "Reader's Choice" Award for Favorite Specialty Act
- 1999: Art Scholl Memorial Showmanship Award
- 1999: Clifford W. Henderson Achievement Award
- 2007: ICAS Foundation Airshow Hall of Fame
