= The Great Canadian Bagel =

Canadian coffee house and quick service restaurant chain and franchise

- Type: Restaurant franchise
- Industry: Food service
- Genre: Coffee house, bakery, and quick service restaurant
- Headquarters: Canada
- Number of locations: 14 (As of 2024)
- Products: Bagels, Coffee, Tea, Breakfast Sandwiches

The Great Canadian Bagel is a coffee house and quick service restaurant chain and franchise. It was established in 1993 and is an affiliate of The Great American Bagel Bakery. As of March 2024 it has 14 stores located in Ontario, New Brunswick, and Prince Edward Island. The restaurant offers bagels to go in bulk, as well as cream cheese, and serves single toasted bagels with cream cheese or butter, and bagel breakfast sandwiches.

== See also ==
- List of Canadian restaurant chains
- The Great American Bagel Bakery
