= Jim LeRoy =

United States Marine (1961–2007)

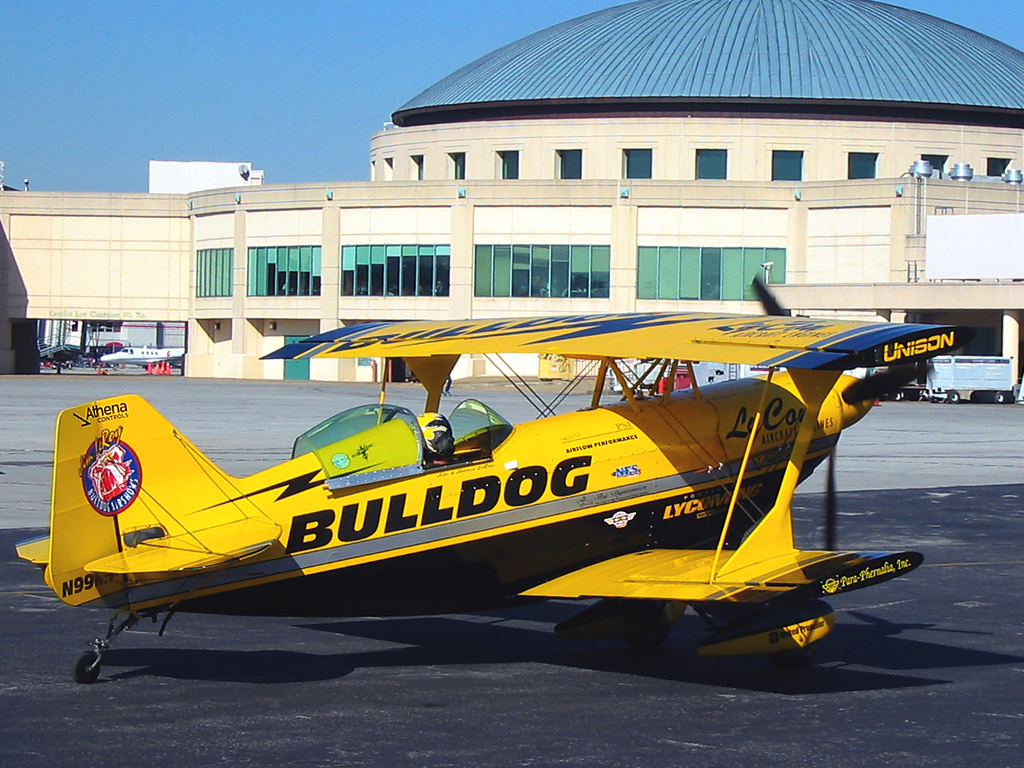
Jim LeRoy in "Bulldog"

Jim LeRoy (April 5, 1961 – July 28, 2007) was an American aerobatics pilot. He died upon impact in a crash at the Dayton Air Show in Ohio.

== Background ==
A former US Marine Corps Scout/Sniper, Jim LeRoy held a B.S. degree in Aeronautical/Aerospace engineering as well as an Airframe and Powerplant (A&P) license.

== Stunt flying ==
Initially flying solo performances, he gained a reputation with his highly energetic aerobatic displays. In 2003, LeRoy joined a daring and successful airshow troupe, the X-team, who referred to themselves as the Masters of Disaster. Their performance generally consisted of three pilots flying a simultaneous, chaotic, interweaving aerobatic display through clouds of smoke generated by circling jet-powered trucks below. After two seasons of successful airshows, an accident occurred on July 10, 2005, during a routine performance when Jimmy Franklin and Bobby Younkin collided in mid-air. Jim LeRoy was not involved in the collision and landed safely.

LeRoy was one of only eleven pilots ever to be awarded both the Art Scholl Showmanship Award (2002) and the Bill Barber Award for Showmanship (2003). He was also one of only a handful of full-time air show pilots in the world who actually made his living by performing for air show audiences.

LeRoy also held the following pilot ratings: single-engine, multi-engine, airplane instructor, helicopter, helicopter instructor, instrument instructor and aerobatic competency evaluator.

== Death ==
Around 2:15PM EST at the Vectren Dayton Air Show at Dayton International Airport outside Dayton, Ohio, LeRoy crashed his S2S Bulldog II, while in performance with the X-Team Codename: Mary's Lamb aerobatics team. Initial indications showed that he was performing a 1/2 Cuban 8 and snap rolls on the 45-degree down line, but recovered too low to the ground to pull out. He hit the runway at 200 mph (320 km/h), although his vertical speed was only around 75 mph (120 km/h); the plane slid 300 yards (270 m) and burst into flames. LeRoy was pronounced dead in a military MEDEVAC helicopter while in transit to Miami Valley Hospital in Dayton, Ohio. The coroner's report states that LeRoy died on impact due to a fracture of his neck, but that he also was badly burned.
