= Dayton–Wright Brothers Airport =

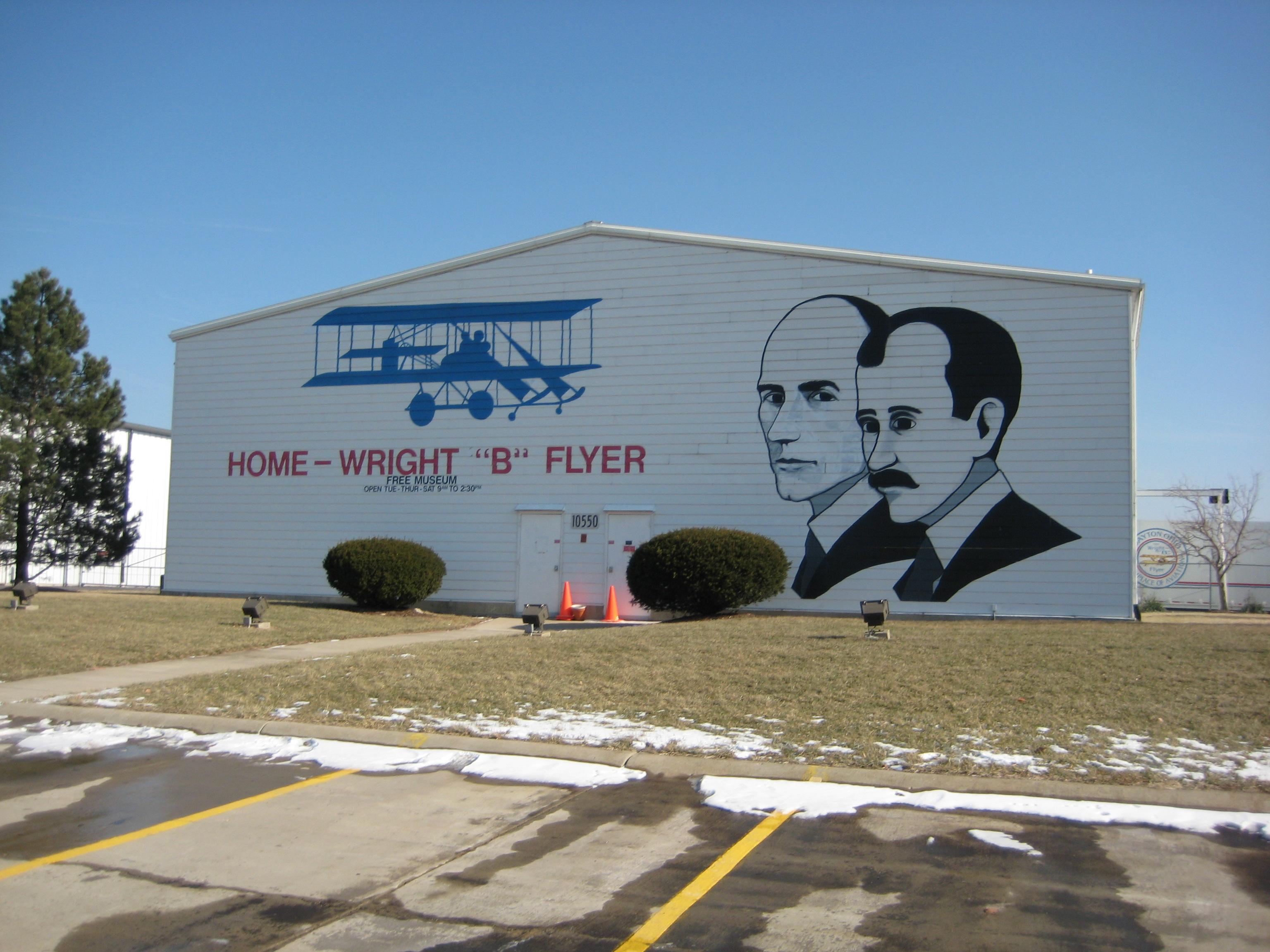
- Wright B Flyer Museum
- IATA: MGY; ICAO: KMGY; FAA LID: MGY

Summary
- Airport type: Public
- Owner: City of Dayton
- Serves: Dayton, Ohio
- Location: Miami Township, Montgomery County / Clearcreek Township, Warren County
- Time zone: UTC−05:00 (-5)
  - Summer (DST): UTC−04:00 (-4)
- Elevation AMSL: 957 ft (292 m)
- Coordinates: 39°35′20″N 084°13′30″W
- Website: www.flydayton.com/dayton-wright-brothers-airport

Map
- Location of airport in Ohio MGY (the United States)

Runways
Direction	Length		Surface
Direction	ft	m	Surface
2/20	5,000	1,524	Asphalt

Statistics (2022)
- Aircraft operations: 38,690
- Based aircraft: 73
- Source: Federal Aviation Administration

Dayton–Wright Brothers Airport (IATA: MGY, ICAO: KMGY, FAA LID: MGY) is a public airport located 10 miles (16 km) south of the central business district of Dayton, Ohio, located mainly in Miami Township, Montgomery County and partly in Clearcreek Township, Warren County, near the suburb of Springboro. It is owned and operated by the City of Dayton and serves as the reliever airport for Dayton International Airport. It mainly serves corporate and personal aircraft users. The airport's identifying code, MGY, is a reference to its former name of Montgomery County Airport.

== History ==
Efforts to build the Montgomery County Airport had begun by late September 1954, when articles of incorporation for an eponymous company were filed. The development of the airport had been prompted by the closure of the South Dayton Airport and the subsequent attempts of the owners of now displaced aircraft to find a home. The company, run by Charles F. Kettering, purchased the first approximately 17 acres (6.9 ha) of a planned 345 acres (140 ha) airport in early January 1955. Construction of the airport and a 5,000-foot (1,500 m) northeast-southwest runway began in early September. By the time it opened, it was owned by a consortium of local companies. By the end of 1958, a 19,600 sq ft (1,820 m^{2}) hangar was under construction and consideration was being given to adding 36 t-hangars. The Dayton Pilots Club, founded in February 1958, was based at the airport by November 1959.

Southern Ohio Aviation picked up the lease for the airport in late April 1960. The company became a regional distributor for the Navion Rangemaster in late December 1961 and a worldwide interior customization center for Aero Commander just over a week later. By early February 1965, it was acting as a distributor for the Jet Commander as well, and purchased one of the aircraft for itself in August 1966 to operate a jet charter service.

By mid 1969, the city of Dayton was contemplating the establishment of a network of local airports. As the first part of this program, it initially moved to purchase the airport from the Kettering Foundation, but, as negotiations were ongoing, changed approach to leasing it. The airport would then be subleased to the fixed-base operator, Southern Ohio Aviation, and the profit used to improve the infrastructure with the goal of ultimately enabling it to act as a reliever for Cox Municipal Airport. It took over operation at the beginning of November 1970, but by October of the following year the assets of Southern Ohio Aviation had been seized by the IRS for unpaid taxes. In 1972, a chamber of commerce sponsored event called General Aviation Day was held at the airport for the first time. (Note: Although the event had occurred since 1968, until 1972 it had been located at Dayton Municipal Airport.) The city acquired the airport outright on 11 January 1974 and the name Dayton General Airport South, selected in a contest, was applied to the facility at Aviation Day in mid September. However, this was the last time the event would be held at the airport. Due to growing interest and insufficient parking capacity, it was combined with a one-off open house at Wright-Patterson Air Force Base and moved to the Dayton Municipal Airport in 1975 to become the Dayton Air Fair. The following month, it was learned the airport failed to receive a federal grant to pay for, in part, the installation of a VOR/DME.

The two fixed base operators, Flightways and Dayton Aviation, announced January 1975 that they would be merging, with the latter becoming a subsidiary of the former. Paid for with municipal bonds, a 35,000-square-foot (3,300 m^{2}) administration building and hangar were dedicated in late 1976.

The airport was approved to purchase 345 acres (140 ha) of land and extend a taxiway by August 1980. This was followed by the announcement of a project to equip the airport with an instrument landing system two months later. In late January 1981, the city began efforts to evict Flightways for lack of payment of rent. Two months later, the runway lights had stopped working and the contract for a taxiway extension had not been awarded, but the city was unable to proceed with the eviction as the company was under bankruptcy protection.

The Wright 'B' Flyer, Inc. was gifted land at the airport by Dayton in late December 1984 to build a hangar. Warren County's approval of the annexation of land near the airport to Springboro in 1986 raised concerns that residential development could threaten the airport. The airport was connected to the city sewer system in 1988. Northcoast Executive Airlines began serving the airport in February 1990, but filed for bankruptcy just under a year later. By mid May 1990, a 7,000 sq ft (650 m^{2}) hangar for the Wright B Flyer was almost complete. A proposal to build a housing development at the south end of the airport in September 1992 was met with opposition by Dayton due to its proximity to the runway. By 1994, the airport was considering closing its shorter runway and establishing a fly-in community. The facility was due to be renamed Dayton–Wright Brothers Airport in December 1995. In 1997, Commander-Aero, a service center for Aero Commander aircraft, moved from the Greene County Airport to the "silver hangar" at the airport and renovated the dilapidated structure. The city was due to reach a deal with the YMCA in March 1999 for a land swap that exchanged property at the south end of the runway and elsewhere for a parcel on which the latter could construct a new location. At the same time, the developer of a nearby subdivision called Settlers Walk agreed to implement an easement to prevent complaints from future residents about the airport. The athletic facility was nearing completion by December, but the FAA had denied a church authorization to construct a building nearby. (Note: The church would eventually receive a dedicated building in 2012.) By October 2001, a project to repave the runway, enlarge the ramp build a hangar access road and install a PAPI for Runway 2 was almost finished.

Planning to create a joint economic development district began in March 2004. A 12,000 sq ft (1,100 m^{2}) hangar was under construction at the airport in January 2005. Two months later, the airport was rezoned from agricultural and light industrial to airport to allow for increased commercial services.

A proposal to move Austin Pike at the north end of the airport slightly farther from the end of the runway was made in March 2008. In 2009, the airport received $150,000 to conduct a pavement management study. In February 2010, the city announced it would open proposals for commercial development on 150 acres (61 ha) of land at the airport later that month. However, a fatal crash the at the start of the next month brought criticism from the community. The airport began holding an event called Runway Fest in 2012. It was again proposed in September 2014 that the since-renamed Austin Boulevard be relocated further north to accommodate a potential 500-foot (150 m) runway extension.

The Connor Group built a 17,000 sq ft (1,600 m^{2}) hangar at the airport in 2018. Planned construction of two new approximately 7,200 sq ft (670 m^{2}) hangars was announced in 2019. A developer agreed to purchase 170 acres (69 ha) of airport property in August 2020. In 2022, the airport received over $1 million from the Federal Aviation Administration to complete infrastructure upgrades. Funds were focused on mitigating wildlife hazards at the airport. A new private hangar was under construction in December 2024. Higher Ground Helicopters submitted a zoning request in May 2026 to build an 8,000-square-foot (740 m^{2}) hangar.

== Facilities and aircraft ==
Dayton–Wright Brothers Airport covers an area of 541 acres (219 ha) which contains one asphalt paved runway (2/20) measuring 5,000 x 100 ft (1,524 x 30 m). The airport has instrument landing facilities, but does not have a control tower.

For the 12-month period ending September 8, 2022, the airport had 38,690 aircraft operations, an average of 106 per day: 98% general aviation (48% general aviation local, 45% general aviation itinerant), 2% air taxi, and <1% military. This is less than half of the 89,000 aircraft operations the airport had in 2016. In 2022, there were 73 aircraft based at this airport: 49 single-engine and 10 multi-engine airplanes as well as 7 jets and 7 helicopters.

The airport facilities also include a runway equipped with a partial precision approach consisting of a localizer (LOC), approach lighting system (MALS), runway lighting (MIRL) and a visual approach slope indicator (VASI), 68 T-hangars, 6 conventional hangars, 5,000 sq ft (460 m^{2}). maintenance facility and 9,600 sq ft (890 m^{2}) administration building.

The airport has a fixed-base operator that offers fuel, general maintenance, courtesy transportation, a conference room, a crew lounge, snooze rooms, and more.

On the airport grounds is a replica of the Wright brothers' Huffman Prairie hangar, containing a museum and replica Wright B Flyer. The museum is open to the public during limited hours.

== Accidents and incidents ==
- On 23 September 1965, a Mooney M20A was heavily damaged by fire after the nose gear collapsed while landing at the airport.
- On 28 November 1966, a Piper PA-23 Apache crashed due to engine failure while preparing to land at the airport, injuring the pilot and three passengers.
- On 6 August 1967, a Ryan PT-22 Recruit overturned while landing at the airport, destroying the airplane and injuring the two occupants.
- On 13 July 1983, a Beech 18 made a gear up landing at the airport.
- On July 23, 2001, a Cessna 172 Skyhawk was substantially damaged while landing at the Dayton–Wright Brothers Airport. Over the runway, the pilot flared and over rotated the airplane. The airplane touched down hard, and the nose wheel contacted the ground bursting the tire. The airplane came to a stop on the right side of the runway, and the pilot egressed. The probable cause of the accident was found to be the pilot's excessive flare, which resulted in a hard landing.
- On September 13, 2002, a Cessna 177 Cardinal was substantially damaged during a landing at Dayton–Wright Brothers Airport. During the landing flare, the airplane "ballooned", and he elected to go around. At the time, the airplane was in a "very slow flight configuration" and would not gain airspeed or climb during the go-around. The pilot elected to land the airplane at the departure end of the runway approached because it would not climb and was not under control. He said the speed was high at touchdown, the landing gear collapsed, and the airplane veered off the runway. The probable cause of the accident was found to be the pilot's failure to maintain adequate airspeed, resulting in a stall.
- On September 26, 2004, a Cessna 152 was substantially damaged during a forced landing in a field after experiencing a total loss of engine power near the Dayton–Wright Brothers Airport. While en route from Hook Field to the Moraine Airpark, the engine totally failed, and the student pilot onboard attempted to glide the airplane to the Dayton–Wright Brothers Airport but instead made an emergency landing 1/2 mile west of the airport. An FAA inspector did not note any fuel in either tan, nor any evidence of fuel near the vicinity of the wreckage. The probable cause of the accident was found to be the student pilot's inadequate preflight and in-flight planning, which resulted in a total loss of engine power during cruise flight due to fuel exhaustion.
- On July 24, 2009, a Beech H-18 veered to the left and off runway 02 at the Dayton–Wright Brothers Airport after the tail wheel touched down during landing. The pilot stated the tail wheel lock pin did not remain in the locked position. The right main landing gear collapsed and the right wing skin became wrinkled when it contacted the ground resulting in substantial damage.
- On April 1, 2010, a Beech B36TC Bonanza impacted terrain short of the runway during a forced landing following a loss of engine power at the Dayton–Wright Brothers Airport. A witness who heard the departure said the engine initially sounded normal but that it suddenly cut out. She subsequently observed the aircraft in a 45° right turn, which it maintained until she lost sight of it. Additional witnesses reported observing the airplane approach the airport from the west with the landing gear in the retracted position. They stated that the airplane banked to the left in an apparent attempt to line-up with runway 2. The left wingtip struck the ground and the airplane impacted an open grass area south of the runway. A post impact fire ensued. The cause of the accident was found to be the complete loss of engine power due to failure of the No. 1 main bearing, and the secondary failure of a crankcase through-bolt and the fuel pump drive coupling.
- On July 14, 2018, a Piper PA-22 was damaged during landing at the Dayton–Wright Brothers Airport. The pilot reported that, during the flare, he felt a wind shift push the airplane left of centerline. He applied opposite rudder, but the airplane touched down "skewed", pointed to the right. The airplane then exited the runway to the right and ground looped on the adjacent field.

== See also ==
- List of airports in Ohio
