= Toledo Express Airport =

Airport in Lucas County, Ohio

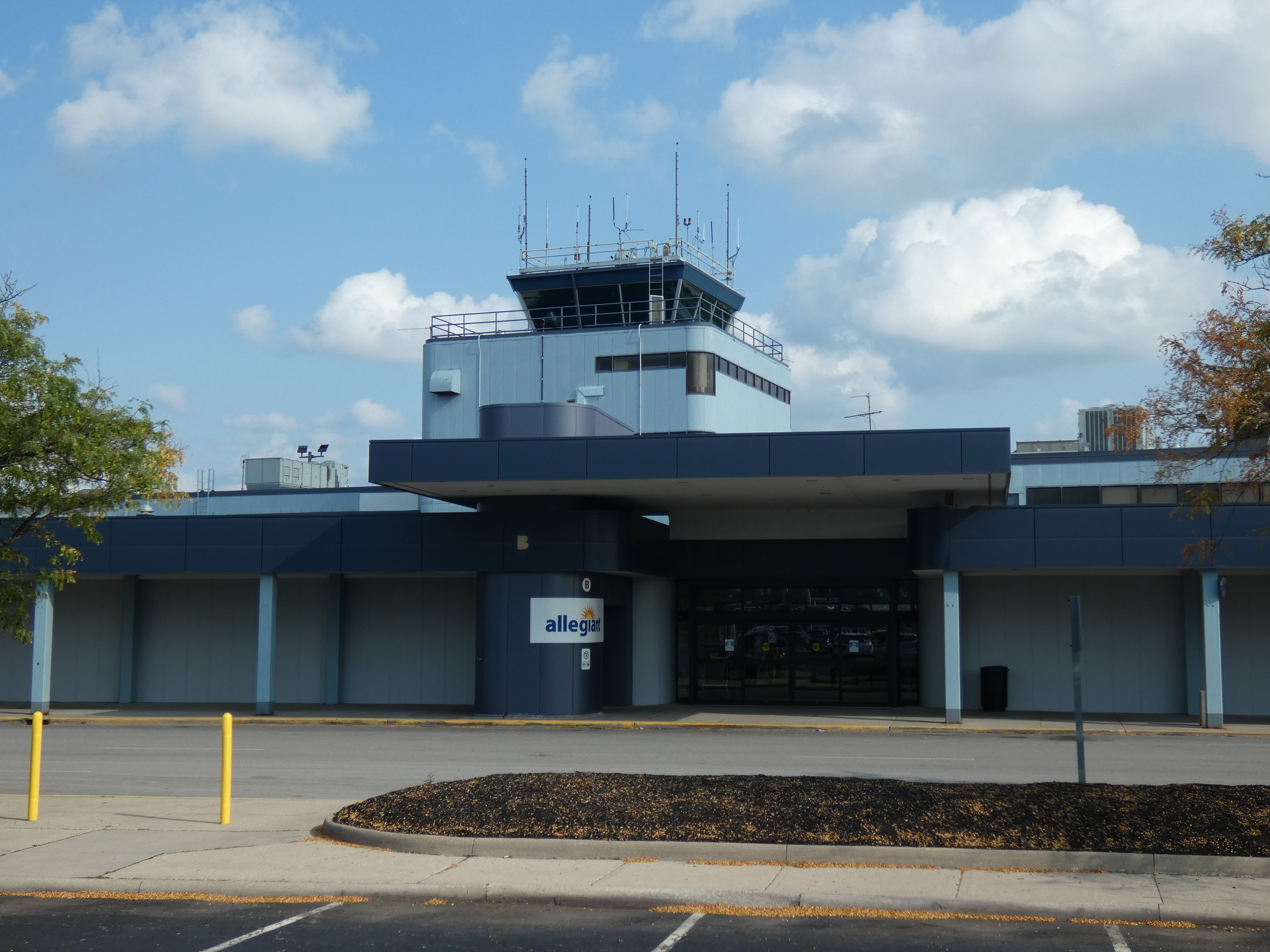
- Terminal entrance with control tower
- IATA: TOL; ICAO: KTOL; FAA LID: TOL

Summary
- Airport type: Public
- Owner: Toledo–Lucas County Port Authority
- Serves: Toledo, Ohio and Detroit, Michigan
- Location: Swanton / Monclova townships, Lucas County, Ohio, United States
- Opened: dedication: October 31, 1954 operation: January 5, 1955
- Elevation AMSL: 684 ft (208 m)
- Coordinates: 41°35′15″N 83°48′45″W
- Website: www.toledoexpress.com

Maps
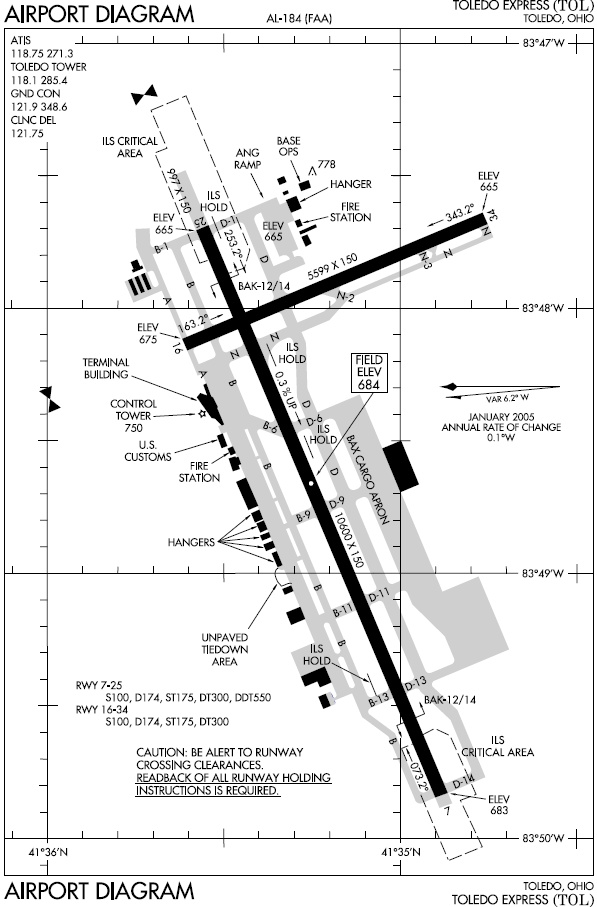
- FAA diagram
- Interactive map of Toledo Express Airport

Runways
Direction	Length		Surface
Direction	ft	m	Surface
07/25	10,600	3,231	Asphalt (150 ft or 46 m wide)
16/34	5,599	1,707	Asphalt (150 ft or 46 m wide)

Statistics (2022)
- Aircraft Movements: 34,313
- Based Aircraft: 80
- Source: Federal Aviation Administration

Toledo Express Airport, officially Eugene F. Kranz Toledo Express Airport (IATA: TOL, ICAO: KTOL, FAA LID: TOL), is a civil-military airport in Swanton and Monclova townships, 10 mi (16 km) west of Toledo in western Lucas County, Ohio, United States. It was dedicated on October 31, 1954, and opened on January 5, 1955, as a replacement for the Toledo Municipal Airport, now Toledo Executive Airport, southeast of Toledo. Toledo Express is near the crossing of State Route 2 and the Ohio Turnpike (Interstate 80/Interstate 90, exit 52).

Toledo is used by both passenger and cargo airlines and general aviation. It is also home to the Ohio Air National Guard's 180th Fighter Wing. The airport is a secondary airport for Detroit Metropolitan Airport (DTW) and the surrounding region, including as a primary diversion point for DTW. The airport is operated by the Toledo–Lucas County Port Authority on a lease agreement from the City of Toledo. The airport also serves as headquarters and the ground cargo hub for BX Solutions.

Throughout the 1980s and 1990s, the airport saw considerable airline service with as many as seven airlines, at any given time, operating over 40 flights per day to fourteen destinations. Traffic peaked in 1997, then began a downfall as many passengers began driving to nearby Detroit Metropolitan Airport, a major hub airport. By 2011, all but two airlines had discontinued service. Traffic bottomed out in 2012, then began a slow growth. In 2015, Toledo Express recorded its third straight year of passenger growth, reaching 179,911.

In 2018, buoyed by growing service to and from Charlotte-Douglas International Airport, air travel through Toledo Express Airport increased by more than 22 percent for its sixth straight year of growth. Total passenger service reached 241,299 passengers in 2018.

The airport was officially renamed to honor retired NASA flight director and Toledo native Gene Kranz in September 2020.

== History ==
Efforts to build a modern airport started shortly after World War II, when civic leaders realized that Toledo Municipal Airport (today's Toledo Executive Airport) was inadequate. A number of locations were proposed and discarded until 1952, when a consortium of six major Toledo companies – Libbey-Owens-Ford, Owens-Illinois, Owens-Corning Fiberglas, Champion Spark Plug, Electric Auto-Lite, and Willys-Overland – acquired the site of Toledo Express Airport west of Toledo and sold the land to the city at cost. The airport was dedicated on October 31, 1954, and officially named Toledo Express Airport the following day. It was to start its first commercial flight operations on January 5, 1955, but they were cancelled due to the weather conditions.

The airport received nearly $3 million from the federal CARES Act during the COVID-19 pandemic. The money went to helping the airport upgrade facilities and continue normal operation during the pandemic's travel downturn.

The airport received another safety grant in 2023, when it received nearly $5 million to enhance its safety and operations.

=== Historical airline service ===
The airlines moved to the new airport around the beginning of 1955; the April 1957 Official Airline Guide (OAG) lists thirteen weekday United Airlines departures, six Trans World Airlines (TWA), six Delta Air Lines flights, four Eastern Air Lines flights and four Capital Airlines services. The November 1979 OAG shows jets on seven airlines. Nonstop flights flew from Toledo to:

  - Air Florida: Boeing 737-200 – Washington, D.C. National Airport
  - Delta Air Lines: Boeing 727-200, McDonnell Douglas DC-9-30 – Atlanta, Cincinnati, Dayton
  - Eastern Air Lines: Boeing 727-200, McDonnell Douglas DC-9-50 – Columbus and direct to Miami and Tampa
  - Frontier Airlines (1950–1986): Boeing 737-200 – Detroit, MI and direct to Denver
  - Trans World Airlines (TWA): Boeing 727-100, Boeing 727-200 – St. Louis. In 1986 TWA had one flight to Cleveland and onto New York JFK
  - United Airlines: Boeing 727-100, Boeing 727-200, Boeing 737-200 – Chicago O'Hare Airport, Cleveland, Denver
  - USAir: BAC One-Eleven, McDonnell Douglas DC-9-30 – Pittsburgh

In 1979, the OAG shows Air Wisconsin and Comair at Toledo as independent commuter airlines, Air Wisconsin flying Fairchild Swearingen Metroliners nonstop to Chicago O'Hare and Detroit (DTW) while Comair Piper Navajos flew nonstop to Cincinnati. In February 1985, Piedmont Airlines (1948–1989) Boeing 727-200s flew to San Francisco (SFO) via Dayton, Ohio.

On January 8, 1989, American Eagle Airlines, operating for American Airlines, began nonstop service to Chicago O'Hare with four daily flights. By December 1989, American Eagle had five nonstop weekday ATR-42s between Chicago and Toledo, while United Express, operated by Air Wisconsin, had four weekday round trips between Chicago and Toledo, three with Fokker F27s and one with a BAe 146-200.

The OAG shows other airlines at Toledo at the end of 1989, including:

  - Continental Express operated by Britt Airways: Embraer EMB-120 Brasilia – nonstop commuter turboprop service to Cleveland, OH (CLE) Continental Express' last flight, to CLE, was to end on March 1. 2001
  - Delta Air Lines: Boeing 727-200, McDonnell Douglas DC-9-30 – nonstop service to Atlanta, GA (ATL) and Fort Wayne, IN (FWA)
  - Delta Connection operated by Comair: Fairchild Swearingen Metroliner – nonstop commuter turboprop service to Cincinnati, OH (CVG) On March 13, 2011, Delta Air Lines' last flight from Toledo, a Delta Connection CRJ flight to MSP, was operated. Northwest Airlines also operated from the airport until its acquisition by Delta.
  - Northwest Airlink operated by Mesaba Airlines: Fairchild Swearingen Metroliner – nonstop commuter turboprop service to Detroit, MI (DTW)
  - USAir: Boeing 727-200, McDonnell Douglas DC-9-30 – nonstop service to Dayton, OH (DAY) and Pittsburgh, PA (PIT)
  - USAir Express: British Aerospace BAe Jetstream 31 – nonstop commuter turboprop service to Dayton, OH (DAY) and Indianapolis, IN (IND)
- 1997 was the busiest year in Toledo Express' history with 679,841 passenger enplanements. A spike in growth that year was attributed to AirTran Airways offering low cost jet flights to Orlando, Florida.

After 1997, traffic began declining and airlines began suspending all service as a general trend in passenger traffic chose to drive to nearby Detroit Metropolitan Airport, a major hub airport.

On March 14, 2011, Delta Connection discontinued all service, leaving Toledo with only two airlines providing scheduled service: American Eagle with four flights per day to Chicago O'Hare and Allegiant Air with two flights per week to both Orlando and St. Petersburg, Florida. This was an historic low point for Toledo air service, and since then the airport has only seen Allegiant add two flights per week to Punta Gorda Airport (Florida) in 2013 and American Eagle added two daily flights to Charlotte-Douglas International Airport in 2017. American did, however, drop its one daily flight to Chicago. On March 13, 2012, Charter carrier Direct Air suspended operations from the airport. The charter carrier was subject to Chapter 7 liquidation on April 12, 2012.

On December 5, 2012, Allegiant Air announced new twice-weekly service from Toledo Express and Punta Gorda, FL, replacing previous suspended service by Direct Air.

On December 12, 2012, Sierra West Airlines, a cargo air carrier, signed a 30-year lease to open a new aircraft and crew base at Toledo. The airline announced it would lease a 17,555 sq. ft. hangar formerly used by BD Aeroworks.

On September 6, 2022, American Airlines' (Envoy Air) Embraer 145 flew out for the last time to Chicago O'Hare, marking the end of legacy airline passenger service at the airport.

=== Burlington Air Express / BAX Global hub ===
Toledo Express served as the main North American hub for DB Schenker, which acquired BAX Global, an international air cargo company, from 1993 until September 2011. DB Schenker leased a 300,000-square-foot (30,000 m^{2}) warehouse facility with direct access to the runways at Toledo Express. They operated approximately 20 flights on average (with a peak of 42) per night from across the United States. Toledo Express was the 22nd busiest cargo hub in North America in 2009 with 241,472 tons handled. The facility is now home to the headquarters of BX Solutions, a ground logistics and shipping company started up by former BAX Global employees with plans to re-establish the former domestic BAX Global ground and eventually air networks.

=== Passenger air service history ===
Airline service before 1955 operated from present-day Toledo Executive Airport, formerly known as Toledo Municipal Airport and Toledo Metcalf Airport.

Airline	Destination(s)	Aircraft scheduled	Service date(s)	Comments
Air Florida	New York JFK, Tampa, Washington National	Boeing 737-200, DC-9-10	June 14, 1979 – September 5, 1979 (JFK), October 26, 1979 – September 30, 1982 (DCA), February 1980 – September 30, 1982 (TPA)	
AirTran Airways	Atlanta, Dayton, Orlando	Boeing 737-200, DC-9-30, Boeing 717-200	November 14, 1996 – February 28, 1998, October 3, 2000 – April 29, 2002	
Air Wisconsin	Akron-Canton, Chicago O'Hare, Cleveland, Columbus, Flint, Fort Wayne, Kalamazoo, Pittsburgh, South Bend	BAe 146, BAe ATP, Dash 8-300, Dash 7, Metro III	– February 3, 1993	Operating independently and later as United Express
Allegiant Air*	Las Vegas, Destin/Ft. Walton Beach, Phoenix/Mesa	MD-80	December 15, 2005 – April 24, 2006 (LAS)	
America West Express	Columbus, Flint	Beech 1900		Operated by Mesa dba Superior Airlines
American Eagle	Chicago O'Hare, Charlotte	ERJ-145	Service ended September 2021	Operated by Simmons Airlines (later American Eagle Airlines and now Envoy) and Chautauqua Airlines (dba American Connection until name change to American Eagle)
Atlantic Coast Airlines	Cincinnati	Dornier 328JET		dba Delta Connection
Atlantic Southeast Airlines	Atlanta, Cincinnati	ATR 72, CRJ-200, CRJ-700		dba Delta Connection
Beaver Aviation / BAS Airlines	Beaver Falls (PA), Detroit City, Youngstown	Piper Navajo	Early 1980s	
Capital Airlines	Akron, Chicago, Cleveland, Detroit, Flint, Grand Rapids, Lansing, Muskegon, Pittsburgh, Philadelphia	Vickers Viscount, DC-3, DC-4	January 8, 1948 – May 31, 1961	Merged with United. At the time, 14 flights per day at startup was the most ever for a new city.
Chicago Express Airlines	Chicago Midway, South Bend	Jetstream 31, Saab 340	1993–1995, June 28, 2002 – April 1	Operating independently and later as ATA Connection
Chicago and Southern Airlines	Detroit, Fort Wayne			Merged with Delta
Comair	Atlanta, Cincinnati, Columbus, Indianapolis	Piper Chieftain, Piper Navajo, EMB-110, Saab 340, EMB-120, Metro III, CRJ-100, CRJ-200, CRJ-700	1979, January 3, 1981 –	Operating independently and later as Delta Connection
Continental Express	Cleveland	EMB-120, Beech 1900, Dash-8-200		
Delta Air Lines	Atlanta, Cincinnati, Dayton, Detroit, Fort Wayne	Convair 440, Boeing 727-200, Boeing 737-300, MD-88, DC-9-30		
Eastern Airlines	Columbus	Constellation L-1049G, Locheed Electra, Boeing 727-100, Boeing 727-200, DC-9-30, DC-9-50		
Frontier Airlines	Denver, Detroit	Boeing 737-200, MD-80		
Lake Central Airlines	Pittsburgh, Lima, Findlay OH, Columbus, Detroit, Jackson MI, Dayton. Cincinnati	Convair 580, Convair 340, DC-3, Nord 262	1957–1968	Merged with Allegheny in 1968
Liberty Airlines	Chicago Midway & O'Hare	Convair 440	February 1982 – May 16, 1983	Plans for CMH, CLE, STL, BUF, & EWR scrapped. Also flew CAK–ORD.
Midway Connection	Chicago Midway	EMB-120, Dornier 228		
Mesaba Aviation	Detroit, Youngstown	Dash 8-200, Fokker 27, Metro III, Saab 340		Original and dba Northwest Airlink
Piedmont Airlines	Dayton	Boeing 727-200, Boeing 737-200		Merged with USAir
TransMeridian Airlines	Las Vegas, Sanford/Orlando	Boeing 757-200, Boeing 727-200, MD-80		Filed for Bankruptcy
Trans Midwest Airlines	Columbus, Dayton, Detroit Metro, Lima	Piper Navajo	1983–1985	
Trans World Airlines	Detroit, Dayton, Columbus, St. Louis, Cleveland, New York JFK	Martin 404, Boeing 727-100, -200, DC-9	1941–1960, 1979–1989	
United Airlines	Chicago O'Hare, Cleveland, Denver, Detroit, Fort Wayne, Newark, Peoria, Saginaw, Washington National, Youngstown	DC-8 series 21, Boeing 727-122, -222, Boeing 737-222, Caravelle, Boeing 720, Convair 340, DC-6B		
US Airways (USAir/Allegheny)	Pittsburgh, Lima, Columbus	Convair 580, Boeing 727-200, MD-80, Boeing 737-200, -300, -400, DC-9-30, BAC One-Eleven, Fokker 100, Fokker 28		
US Airways Express	Dayton, Indianapolis, Pittsburgh	Metro III, Jetstream 31, Saab 340, Dash 8-100, -200, ERJ 145, Dornier 328		Operated by Trans States Airlines, Jetstream International / PSA Airlines, Allegheny Airlines, Chautauqua Airlines, Shuttle America
Vision Airlines	Myrtle Beach	Boeing 737-400	June 1, 2012 – June 29, 2012	

* Carrier continues to serve other destinations.

== Facilities and aircraft ==
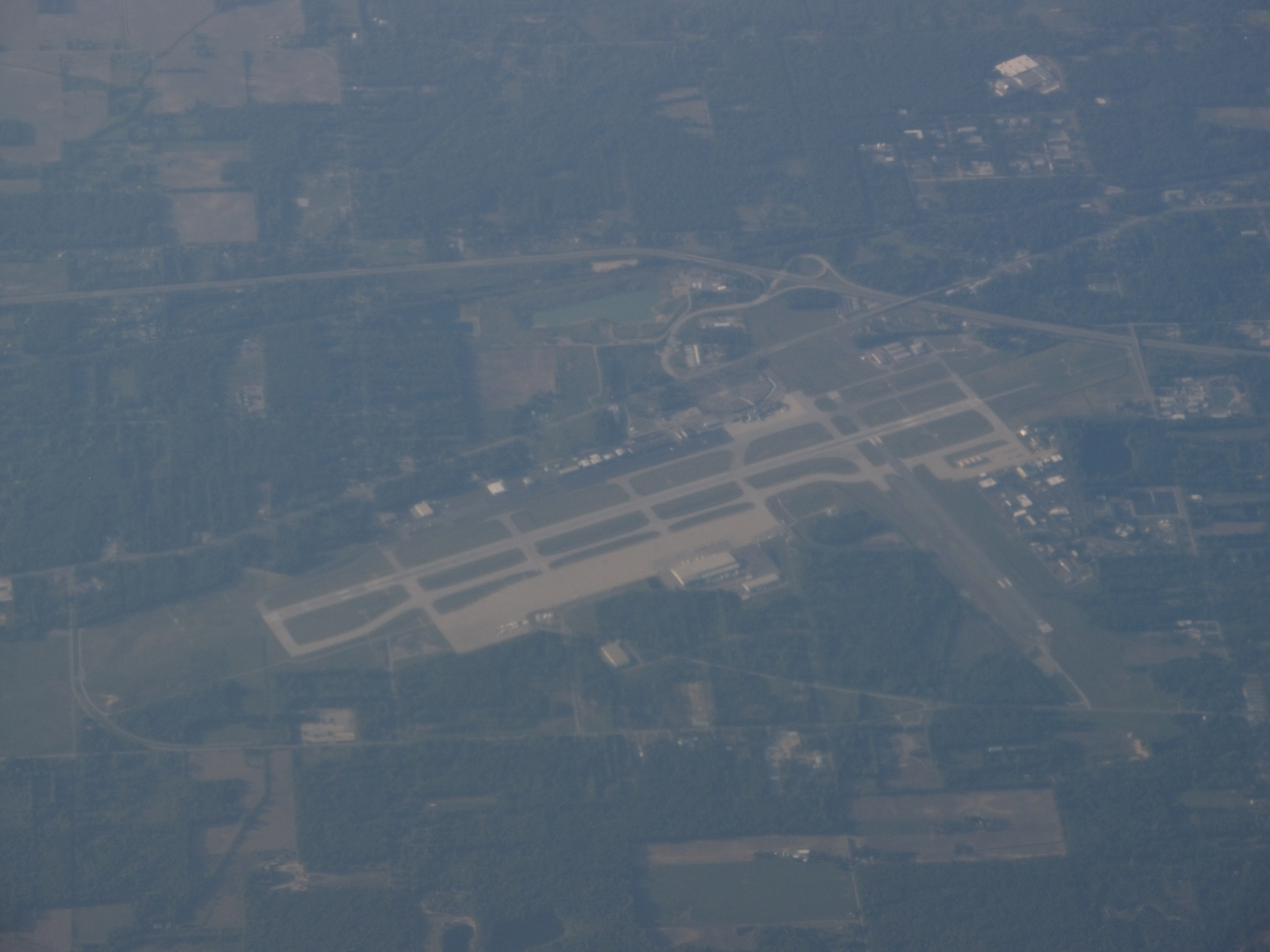

Toledo Express Airport covers 2,345 acres (949 ha) and has two runways:

- 7/25: 10,600 x 150 ft (3,231 x 46 m), asphalt
- 16/34: 5,599 x 150 ft (1,707 x 46 m), asphalt

=== Structures ===
- 81-acre air ramp on the south side of the airport used for air cargo, storage, ground shipping and aircraft diversions
- 8-gate domestic passenger terminal on the north side of the airfield
- Common use air cargo and cold storage building on the north side of the airfield by the terminal
- 5000 sq. ft. customs facility to handle inbound international flight crews, passengers, and cargo, opened in April 2016
- The airport has three fixed-base operators offering fuel, general maintenance, hangars, courtesy vehicles, conference rooms, crew lounges, snooze rooms, showers, internet, and more.

=== Aircraft ===
For the 12-month period ending December 31, 2022, the airport had 34,313 aircraft operations, or roughly 94 per day. This included 60% general aviation, 18% air taxi, 11% military, and 12% commercial. For the same time period, there were 80 aircraft based on the field: 27 single-engine, 10 multi-engine airplanes, 21 military aircraft, 19 jets, and 3 helicopters.

== Passenger service ==
=== Terminal ===
Toledo Express has one passenger terminal with nine gates, of which three (Gates 3, 4, and 5) in the central part of the terminal are primarily used on a weekly basis. The terminal features an east wing that comprises one upper-level gate (Gate 2) and two lower level gates (Gates 1 and 1A). The ground level gates are capable of supporting up to five total aircraft at once combined. The oldest part of the terminal is the western wing, which comprises Gates 6 through 8 (originally 5 through 7); these are rarely used. During the terminal upgrades that introduced a new gate area for Gate 4 and a brand new Gate 5, the original Gate 5 was renumbered to Gate 6. Previous Gate 6 (now 7) is inoperative and no longer has a jetbridge attached to it; previous Gate 7 (now 8) remains a stairwell to ramp-level boarding.

The terminal is mostly original from the 1950s, but several upgrades have taken place. This includes the remodeling and construction of the east wing as well as the new central gate area.

The terminal has two levels with the passenger waiting area, beyond security, on the upper level. In that area, the passengers have access to a food court and bar on the second level. There is also a children's play area by gate 1 and 2, however this area remains inaccessible to the traveling public. There are vending machines and an ATM on the lower level. Baggage claim is on the lower level on the east side of the terminal with two baggage carousels. The rental car counters are between the arrivals waiting area and the baggage claim. Free wireless (Wi-Fi) is available terminal-wide.

=== 2013 true market study results ===
The Port Authority commissioned a true market study of the Toledo catchment area to determine opportunities for air service development. The study found 510,000 people are within 30 minutes of Toledo Express. The total catchment area encompasses 981,000 residents. The actual passengers per day each way for the Toledo market is 3,241, of which TOL only captures 5.7%. Detroit Metro captures the most at 64.3%, with the remaining traveling to other airports in Cleveland and Columbus. There are also 372 international passengers per day, of which Toledo captures only 2.8%.

Delta Air Lines was the largest airline in the Toledo area, with 44% of the traffic; United Airlines was second with 12.4%, and American Airlines (the only legacy airline serving TOL directly at the time) with 10.3%.

==== Top markets according to the report ====
1. Orlando/Sanford is the largest market, with 259 daily passengers, with only 36 retained, or 13.9% of the market.
2. Miami/Fort Lauderdale/West Palm Beach came in second, with 206 daily passengers and only 3 retained.
3. Las Vegas was third, with 197 daily passengers and only 1 passenger retained each day.
4. Chicago–O'Hare/Midway has 174 daily passengers and had 28 passengers retained each day, for 16% of the market.
5. Tampa/St. Petersburg/Clearwater produced 152 daily passengers with 41 retained, or 27% of the market.
6. Phoenix–Sky Harbor/Mesa
7. Fort Myers/Punta Gorda
8. New York City–JFK/LaGuardia/Newark
9. Los Angeles/Burbank/Ontario/Orange County
10. Baltimore/Washington DC–Dulles/National

== Airlines and destinations ==
Although the airport is not served international flights, it only serve domestic flights to U.S. cities and an international cargo flight to Mexico, which was operated by Aeronaves TSM.

=== Passenger ===
Airlines	Destinations	Refs
Allegiant Air	Orlando/Sanford, Punta Gorda (FL), St. Petersburg/Clearwater, Sarasota	

=== Cargo ===
Airlines	Destinations
Amazon Air	Lakeland

== Ground transportation ==
=== Taxi and shuttle service ===
Taxi service at the airport is currently contracted to A1 Accurate Limousine and Airport Service. While other taxi operators are available in Toledo, none are currently able to stage at the airport.

=== Car rental companies ===
Toledo Express is currently served by Alamo, Avis, Budget, Enterprise, and National.

=== Parking lots ===
The airport offers two parking lots: short term and long term. Both are located on the north side of the airport. The parking lot is operated by Republic Parking Systems and it is also a partner of the Thanks Again rewards program.

== Government and military operations ==

The airport is also home to Toledo Air National Guard Base and the 180th Fighter Wing (180 FW), an Air Combat Command (ACC)-gained unit of the Ohio Air National Guard.

Toledo ANGB consists of a Federal enclave of 135.4 acres (0.548 km^{2}) leased by the Department of Defense for the State of Ohio and the Ohio Air National Guard, housing combat-ready F-16C Fighting Falcon jet fighters and associated Air National Guard support units. Physical facilities consist of 3 administrative, 13 industrial and 7 services building (including hangar facilities), totaling nearly 322,000 square feet.

There are 21 military aircraft based at TOL, supported by 290 full-time Air Reserve Technician (ART) and Active Guard and Reserve (AGR) personnel. Over 600 additional part-time Traditional Air National Guardsmen round out the balance of the 180 FW, capable of deploying worldwide to meet Air Force and combatant commander requirements as part of the Air Reserve Component of the U.S. Air Force. Concurrently, the 180 FW also provides traditional National Guard state support roles in the event of local and state emergencies to the Governor of Ohio.

== Airport based businesses and organizations ==
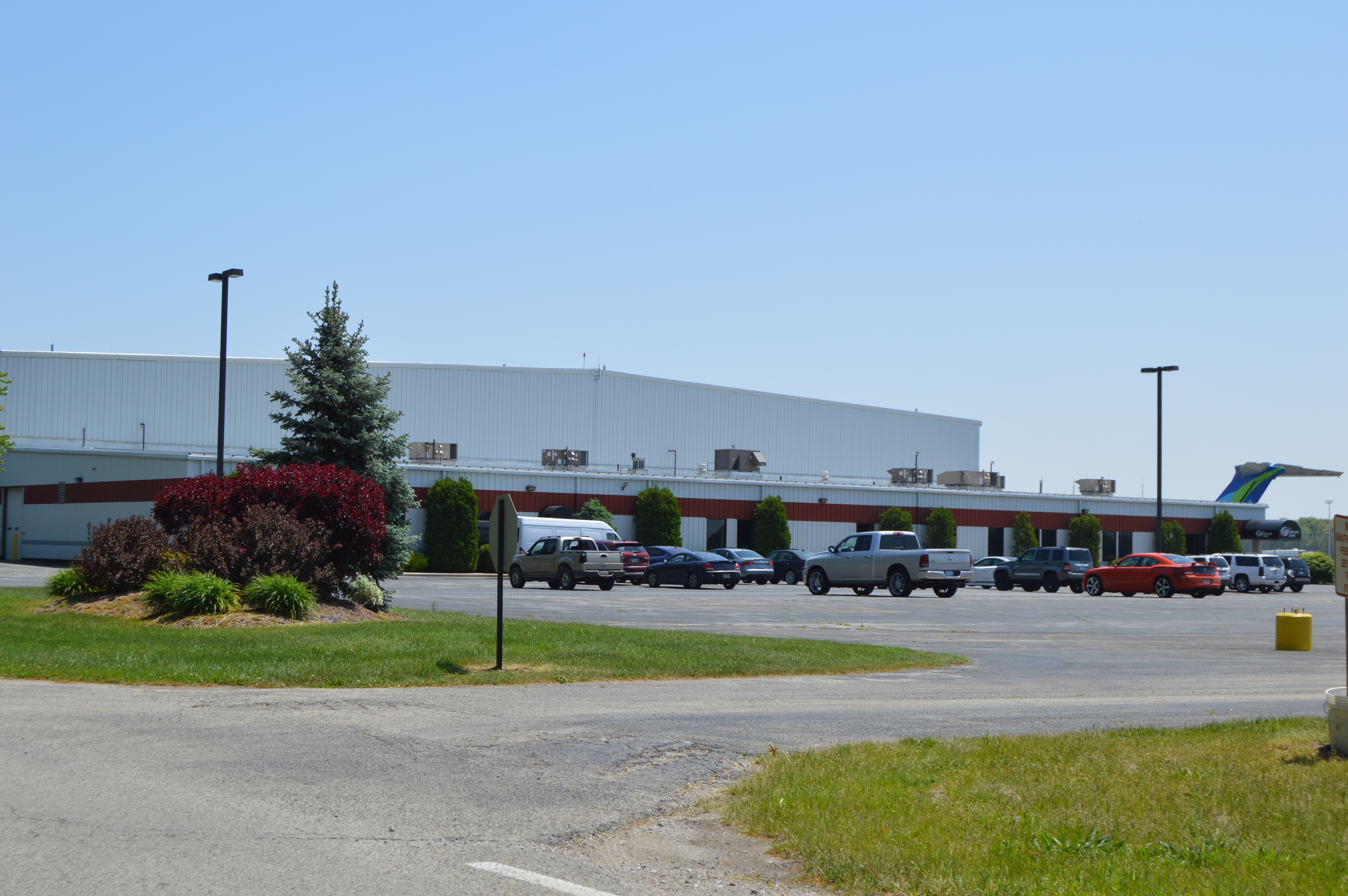
Hangar facility

=== Fixed-base operators ===
- Grand Aire operates as a fixed-base operator on the northwest side of the airport.
- National Flight Services operates as a fixed-base operator on the north side of the airport, and also as an engine overhaul and aircraft maintenance facility.
- TOL Aviation operates as a fixed-base operator on the north side of the airport.

=== Aerospace companies ===
- Toledo Jet Center is a business jet maintenance and avionics services company that specializes in the Cessna Citation aircraft series.
- BD Aero Works is an aircraft charter and maintenance provider.
- Quick Flight is an airline services company offer handling services at over 30 airports across the country for both above- and below-wing services. The company's headquarters is located just west of the airport in Swanton.

=== Corporate hangars ===
- Toledo Express is used for several Toledo area companies as a base for their corporate aircraft. These include Owens-Illinois and Owens-Corning.
- Promedica Air houses its air ambulances at Toledo Express.

=== Toledo–Lucas County Port Authority ===
Toledo–Lucas County Port Authority:

- President: Paul Toth
- Airport Director: Tim O'Donnell
- Manager of Airport Administration: Linda Friend
- Receptionist/Administrative Secretary: Joyce Amborski
- Operations Specialist: Dan Spaugy
- Operations Specialist: Kyle Garris
- Airport Facilities Supervisor: Brad Bogert

=== Education ===
- Toledo Public Schools operated a training center at the airport known as the TPS Aerospace Center from 1973 to 2018. As of 2018, after acquiring the retired Flight Safety building, it has become known as the Aerospace and Natural Science Academy of Toledo or ANSAT. The academy is home to approximately 300-400 students from grades 9-12 and is known for its yearly air expos.

== Cargo Development Zone and Joint Economic Development District ==
In 2013, the Port Authority backed a plan to collect income tax from businesses and employees on property at the airport owned by the Port Authority and other entities that sign on to the agreement. The income tax would be distributed to an airport fund in addition to the participating communities of the city of Toledo and Monclova and Swanton townships. The airport fund would take 55% of the first $500,000, 52.5% of the next $250,000, and declining from there. If revenues are over $1.5 million, the airport would see roughly 24.12% according to reports. A Port Authority Airport Committee meeting also stated that the City of Toledo's share would also be redirected back to the airport fund boosting revenues.

The Cargo Development Zone is an area on the south side of the airport to the south of Runway 7–25, west of Runway 16–34, and north of US-20A. The site features onsite customers and a foreign trade zone. The development area will also provide access to the 78-acre air cargo ramp.

== Accidents and incidents ==
- On October 29, 1960, a chartered plane carrying the Cal Poly football team, hours after a loss to Bowling Green State University, crashed on takeoff at the Toledo Express Airport. Twenty-two of the forty-eight people on board were killed, including sixteen players, the team's student manager, and a Cal Poly football booster. This is the deadliest accident to occur at Toledo Express Airport.
- In the early morning hours of February 15, 1992, an Air Transport International Douglas DC-8-63F cargo jet (tail number N794AL), operating for Burlington Air Express as Flight 805, crashed 3 miles north of the runway into a wheat field just after executing its second missed approach. All four crew members perished and the aircraft, carrying mostly computer parts, was completely destroyed. The cause of the crash is listed as "spatial disorientation" on the part of the captain.
- On April 8, 2003, a Dassault Falcon 20 operated by Grand Aire Express, an instructional flight inbound from Traverse City Airport crashed during an instrument landing system (ILS) approach to Toledo Express Airport descending below the glide slope. Failure to maintain airspeed during the landing configuration and icing conditions contributed to the accident. All three occupants (2 pilots, 1 passenger) were killed.
- On December 1, 2010, a Cessna Citation Excel operated by NetJets Aviation sustained a loss of rudder authority when the airplane's rudder bound during landing at the Toledo Express Airport. The probable cause of the accident was found to be the manufacturer's inadequate initial design and subsequent modifications of the tailcone, which allowed moisture to collect and freeze around rudder cables during flight levels above the freezing level and resulted in a loss of rudder authority.
- On September 11, 2019, a Convair 440 operating as a cargo plane crashed near the airport while preparing to land. Both occupants were killed.

== See also ==
- List of airports in Ohio
