= The Great American Bagel Bakery =

U.S. restaurant franchise

Great American Bagel Bakery
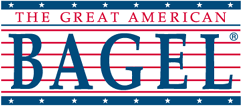
- Type: Private
- Industry: Fast food
- Founded: 1987; 39 years ago
- Headquarters: Westmont, Illinois
- Number of locations: 52 (approx.)
- Key people: Pat Ross, Wayne Flately
- Products: Fast food (including Bagels and Sandwiches)
- Website: greatamericanbagel.com

The Great American Bagel Bakery is a privately owned restaurant franchise started in 1987. The company is based in Westmont, Illinois. Currently, there are 52 locations in 12 states.

== History ==
The Great American Bagel was established in 1987 by president Wayne Flately. The Great American Bagel started franchising in 1994 with the help of Pat Ross, retired founder and president of Rax Restaurants.

== See also ==
- The Great Canadian Bagel
