= Pan Am (1996–1998) =

1996–1998 airline in the United States

Pan American Airways
IATA	ICAO	Call sign
PN	PXA	CLIPPER
- Commenced operations: September 26, 1996; 29 years ago
- Ceased operations: February 26, 1998; 28 years ago (merged with Carnival Air Lines)
- Hubs: Miami International Airport
- Fleet size: 12
- Destinations: 17
- Parent company: Pan Am Corporation
- Headquarters: Doral, Florida, U.S.
- Key people: Charles E. Cobb; Martin Shugrue

Pan American Airways, also known as Pan Am II, was an airline created in 1996 by an investment group that included former US ambassador Charles Cobb. The group purchased the rights to the Pan Am brand after the original carrier declared bankruptcy in 1991. The airline was headquartered in the then-unincorporated city of Doral, near Miami, Florida. It ceased operations in 1998 and was quickly replaced by Pan Am III.

== History ==
In September 1996, Pan Am II was started with an Airbus A300 named the Clipper Fair Wind. The goal was to provide low-cost, long-distance travel to major U.S. and Caribbean cities. The new airline was led by the last Vice Chairman and Chief Operations Officer of Pan Am, Martin Shugrue, who also helped in the creation of the WorldPass frequent flyer program and who served as President of Continental Airlines and later trustee of the Eastern Air Lines estate.

In September 1997, Pan Am Corporation, the airline operation's holding company, bought Carnival Air Lines. However, the rapid expansion and economic troubles of the two companies were too much for the new Pan Am—it only survived for two years before declaring bankruptcy. Before Pan Am and Carnival could fully merge, the holding company and its two independently operated airlines, Pan Am and Carnival, filed bankruptcy and ceased scheduled flight operations in February 1998. The operating certificate used for the first reincarnated Pan Am was abandoned in favor of the acquired Carnival's operating certificate. Pan Am, now operating with the Carnival certificate, quickly resumed limited charter operations while new owner Guilford Transportation Industries acquired certain assets of the bankrupt companies after court approval. The company emerged from bankruptcy in June 1998 again as Pan American Airways, the third incarnation of the Pan Am brand.

== Destinations ==
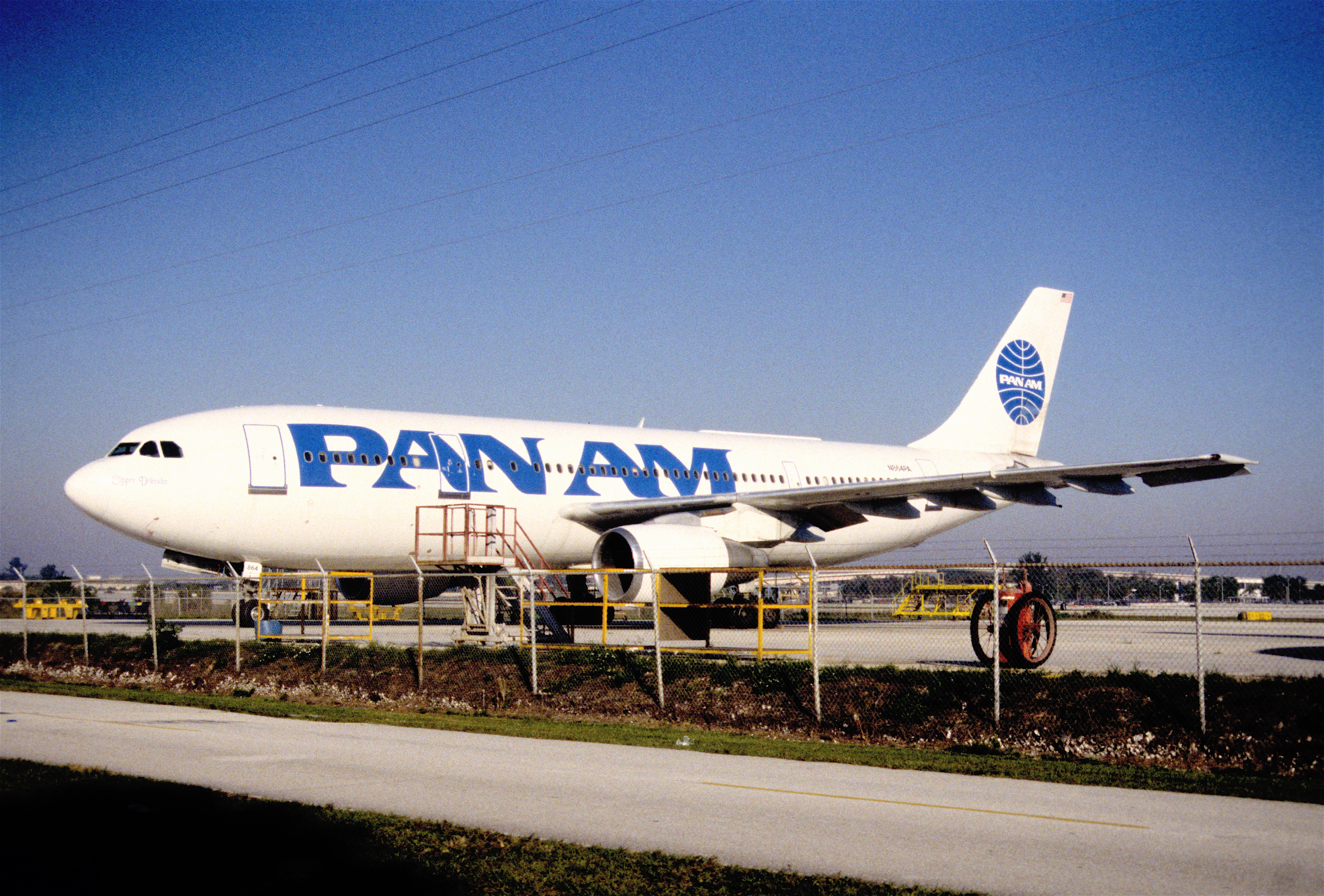
A Pan American Airbus A300B4 parked at Fort Lauderdale–Hollywood International Airport in 1998

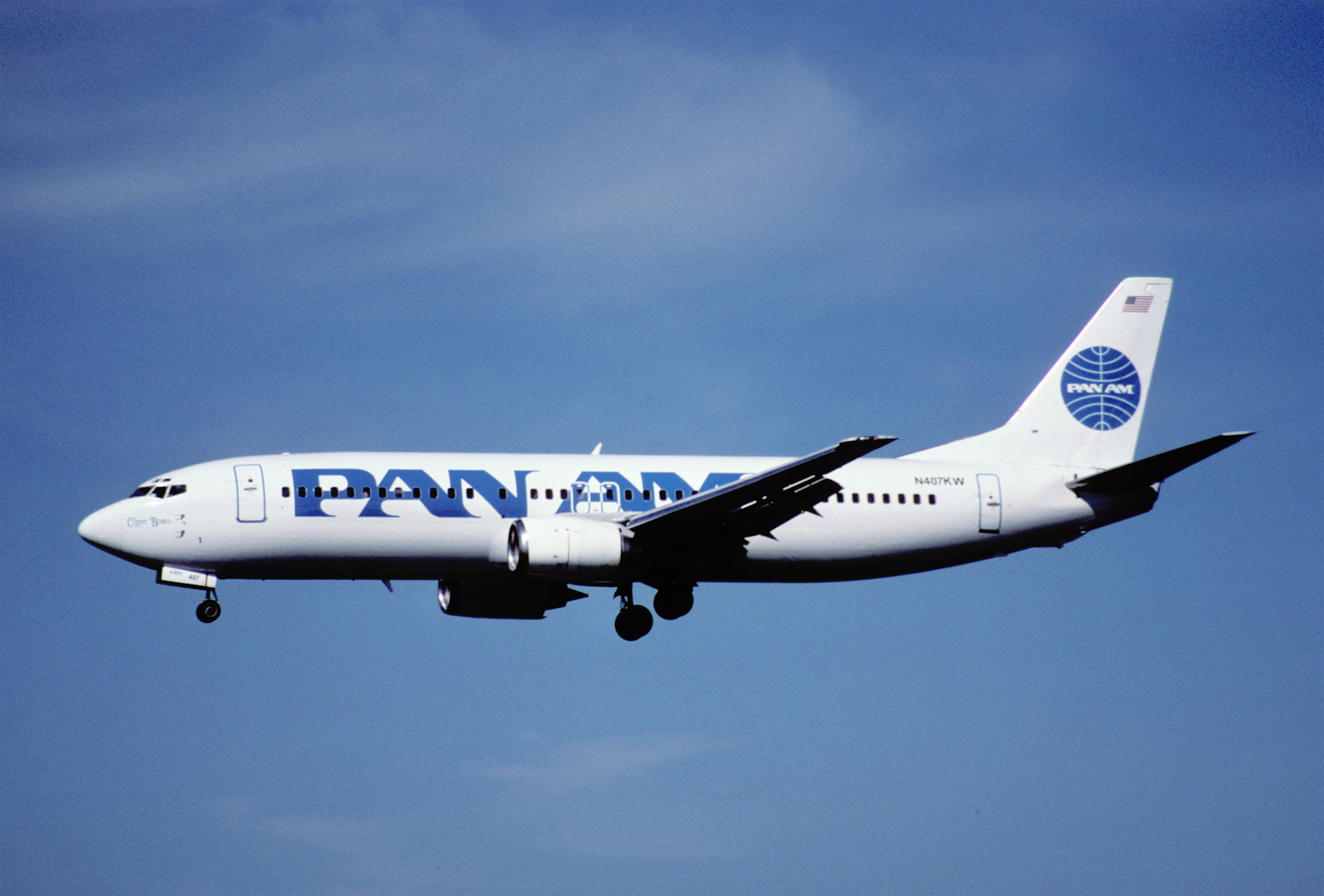
A Pan American Boeing 737-400 approaching Fort Lauderdale–Hollywood International Airport in 1998

In 1997, Pan American Airways served the following destinations:

- Aguadilla, Puerto Rico - Rafael Hernández Airport
- Boston, Massachusetts - Boston Logan International Airport
- Chicago, Illinois - Chicago O'Hare International Airport
- Fort Lauderdale, Florida - Fort Lauderdale–Hollywood International Airport
- Fort Myers, Florida - Southwest Florida International Airport
- Hartford, Connecticut - Bradley International Airport
- Long Island/Islip, New York - Long Island MacArthur Airport
- Miami, Florida - Miami International Airport
- New York City, New York - John F. Kennedy International Airport
- Nassau, Bahamas - Lynden Pindling International Airport
- Orlando, Florida - Orlando International Airport
- Ponce, Puerto Rico - Mercedita Airport
- San Juan, Puerto Rico - Luis Muñoz Marín International Airport
- Santo Domingo, Dominican Republic - Las Américas International Airport
- Tampa/St. Petersburg, Florida - Tampa International Airport
- Washington, DC - Washington Dulles International Airport
- West Palm Beach, Florida - West Palm Beach International Airport

== Fleet ==
According to online data sources, Pan Am operated the following aircraft:

- 8 Airbus A300B4
- 4 Boeing 737-400

== See also ==
- List of defunct airlines of the United States
- Carnival Air Lines
- Pan Am Systems (operated the following three companies)
  - Pan American Airways (1998–2004)
  - Boston-Maine Airways (operated Pan Am Clipper Connection 2004-2008)
  - Pan Am Railways (current user of Pan Am's logos)
