= 2024 United States presidential election in Wyoming =

- November 5, 2024
- Turnout: 59.7% (▼2.9 pp)

Nominee	Donald Trump	Kamala Harris
Party	Republican	Democratic
Home state	Florida	California
Running mate	JD Vance	Tim Walz
Electoral vote	3	0
Popular vote	192,633	69,527
Percentage	71.60%	25.84%

Trump
40–50%
50–60%
60–70%
70–80%
80–90%
90–100%
Harris
40–50%
50–60%
60–70%
70–80%
Tie/No Data
President before election
Joe Biden
Democratic
Elected President
Donald Trump
Republican

The 2024 United States presidential election in Wyoming took place on Tuesday, November 5, 2024, as part of the 2024 United States presidential election in which all 50 states plus the District of Columbia participated. Wyoming voters chose electors to represent them in the Electoral College via a popular vote. The state of Wyoming has three electoral votes in the Electoral College, following reapportionment due to the 2020 United States census in which the state gained no further congressional seats.

A sparsely populated Mountain West state, Wyoming is considered to be a deeply red state, and Donald Trump was expected to easily win the state. Wyoming has not voted for a Democratic presidential candidate since 1964. It has also not voted more Democratic than the nation as a whole since Woodrow Wilson in 1916. Wyoming has also not had a Democratic statewide official since 2006. Furthermore, it had been Trump's second-strongest state in 2016 and his strongest in 2020, voting for Trump by more than a 40% margin in both elections.

On election day, Trump again fared better in Wyoming than in any other state, winning it by 45.76%. Trump's 71.60% vote share in the state was the highest a presidential nominee has ever received in Wyoming, surpassing Ronald Reagan's 70.51% of the vote in 1984. This was despite Trump not winning every county in the state, which last occurred in 2000. Teton County gave Harris 66% of the vote, the second-highest for a Democratic candidate in its history after 2020.

Trump's performance in Wyoming marked the first time that any nominee won over 70% of the vote in any state since 2012, when Barack Obama did so in Hawaii and Mitt Romney in Utah.

== Primary elections ==
=== Republican primary ===
The Wyoming Republican primary was held from April 18 to 20, 2024, as part of the Republican Party primaries. 23 delegates to the 2024 Republican National Convention were selected at county conventions, between February and March, while six delegates were selected at the state convention. However, all 29 delegates were allocated to candidates at the state convention. As the only candidate in the presidential preference poll taken at the state convention, former president and presumptive nominee Donald Trump easily won all 29 delegates.

Endorsements included those from John Barrasso (senator; 2007–present), Cynthia Lummis, (senator 2021–present), Harriet Hageman, WY-AL (US representative, 2023–present), and Timothy Mellon, chairman and majority owner of Pan Am Systems

Wyoming Republican caucus, April 18–20, 2024
Candidate	Votes	Percentage	Actual delegate count		
Candidate	Votes	Percentage	Bound	Unbound	Total
Donald Trump			29		29
Total:			29		29

=== Democratic caucuses ===
The Wyoming Democratic caucuses was held on April 13, 2024, alongside the Alaska primary.

Wyoming Democratic caucuses, April 13, 2024
Candidate	Votes	%	Delegates
Joe Biden (incumbent)	380	95.96	13
David Olscamp	2	0.51	0
Marianne Williamson	1	0.25	0
Stephen Lyons (withdrawn)	0	0.00	0
Jason Palmer	0	0.00	0
Armando Perez-Serrato	0	0.00	0
Dean Phillips (withdrawn)	0	0.00	0
Uncommitted	13	3.28	0
Total	396	100%	13

== General election ==
=== Predictions ===
Source	Ranking	As of
Cook Political Report	Solid R	December 19, 2023
Inside Elections	Solid R	April 26, 2023
Sabato's Crystal Ball	Safe R	June 29, 2023
Decision Desk HQ/The Hill	Safe R	December 14, 2023
CNalysis	Solid R	December 30, 2023
CNN	Solid R	January 14, 2024
The Economist	Safe R	June 12, 2024
538	Solid R	June 11, 2024
RCP	Solid R	June 26, 2024
NBC News	Safe R	October 6, 2024

=== Polling ===
Donald Trump vs. Kamala Harris

Poll source	Date(s) administered	Sample size (Note: Key: A – all adults RV – registered voters LV – likely voters V – unclear)	Margin of error	Donald Trump Republican	Kamala Harris Democratic	Other / Undecided
Cygnal (R)	October 26–28, 2024	600 (LV)	± 4.0%	69%	27%	4% (Note: Oliver (L) with 2%)
University of Wyoming	September 24 – October 27, 2024	662 (LV)	± 3.6%	63%	28%	9% (Note: "Other candidate" with 5%)

Hypothetical polling with Donald Trump and Joe Biden

Donald Trump vs. Joe Biden

Poll source	Date(s) administered	Sample size	Margin of error	Donald Trump Republican	Joe Biden Democratic	Other / Undecided
John Zogby Strategies (Note: Poll conducted for Kennedy's campaign)	April 13–21, 2024	249 (LV)	–	67%	26%	7%
Emerson College	October 1–4, 2023	478 (RV)	±4.5%	68%	15%	18%

Hypothetical polling with other candidates

Donald Trump vs. Robert F. Kennedy Jr.

Poll source	Date(s) administered	Sample size	Margin of error	Donald Trump Republican	Robert F. Kennedy Jr. Independent	Other / Undecided
John Zogby Strategies	April 13–21, 2024	249 (LV)	–	53%	36%	11%

Robert F. Kennedy Jr. vs. Joe Biden

Poll source	Date(s) administered	Sample size	Margin of error	Robert Kennedy Jr. Independent	Joe Biden Democratic	Other / Undecided
John Zogby Strategies	April 13–21, 2024	249 (LV)	–	67%	20%	13%

=== Results ===
State House district results: Trump 40–50% 50–60% 60–70% 70–80% 80–90% 90–100% / Harris 50–60% 60–70% 70–80%

2024 United States presidential election in Wyoming
Party	Candidate	Votes	%	±%
Republican	Donald Trump; JD Vance	192,633	71.60%	+1.64%
Democratic	Kamala Harris; Tim Walz	69,527	25.84%	−0.71%
Libertarian	Chase Oliver; Mike ter Maat	4,193	1.56%	−0.49%
Write-in		2,695	1.00%	+0.37%
Total votes		269,048	100.00%	N/A
Republican win				

==== By county ====
County	Donald Trump Republican		Kamala Harris Democratic		Various candidates Other parties		Margin		Total votes cast
County	#	%	#	%	#	%	#	%	Total votes cast
Albany	8,930	49.95%	8,371	46.83%	576	3.22%	559	3.13%	17,877
Big Horn	4,867	84.86%	742	12.94%	126	2.20%	4,125	71.93%	5,735
Campbell	16,006	87.26%	2,004	10.93%	332	1.81%	14,002	76.34%	18,342
Carbon	4,952	77.53%	1,274	19.95%	161	2.52%	3,678	57.59%	6,387
Converse	5,756	85.41%	845	12.54%	138	2.05%	4,911	72.87%	6,739
Crook	3,805	87.59%	443	10.20%	96	2.21%	3,362	77.39%	4,344
Fremont	11,552	66.94%	5,179	30.01%	525	3.04%	6,373	36.93%	17,256
Goshen	4,893	79.25%	1,156	18.72%	125	2.02%	3,737	60.53%	6,174
Hot Springs	2,082	79.47%	488	18.63%	50	1.91%	1,594	60.84%	2,620
Johnson	3,936	80.36%	847	17.29%	115	2.35%	3,089	63.07%	4,898
Laramie	28,063	64.72%	14,153	32.64%	1,146	2.64%	13,910	32.08%	43,362
Lincoln	8,957	82.63%	1,623	14.97%	260	2.40%	7,334	67.66%	10,840
Natrona	24,671	72.73%	8,337	24.58%	913	2.69%	16,334	48.15%	33,921
Niobrara	1,108	89.79%	112	9.08%	14	1.13%	996	80.71%	1,234
Park	13,084	78.15%	3,259	19.46%	400	2.39%	9,825	58.68%	16,743
Platte	3,874	81.30%	780	16.37%	111	2.33%	3,094	64.93%	4,765
Sheridan	12,041	73.31%	3,920	23.87%	464	2.82%	8,121	49.44%	16,425
Sublette	3,905	79.31%	920	18.68%	99	2.01%	2,985	60.62%	4,924
Sweetwater	12,541	75.10%	3,731	22.34%	426	2.55%	8,810	52.76%	16,698
Teton	4,134	31.12%	8,748	65.84%	404	3.04%	-4,614	-34.73%	13,286
Uinta	7,282	80.12%	1,561	17.17%	246	2.71%	5,721	62.94%	9,089
Washakie	3,125	80.60%	656	16.92%	96	2.48%	2,469	63.68%	3,877
Weston	3,069	87.39%	378	10.76%	65	1.85%	2,691	76.62%	3,512
Totals	192,633	71.60%	69,527	25.84%	6,888	2.56%	123,106	45.76%	269,048

==== County that flipped from Democratic to Republican ====
- Albany (largest municipality: Laramie)

== See also ==
- United States presidential elections in Wyoming
- 2024 Democratic Party presidential primaries
- 2024 Republican Party presidential primaries
- 2024 Wyoming elections
- 2024 United States elections

== Notes ==
Partisan clients
