= Rafael Hernández Airport =

Airport in Aguadilla, Puerto Rico

Rafael Hernández International Airport Aeropuerto Internacional Rafael Hernández (Spanish)

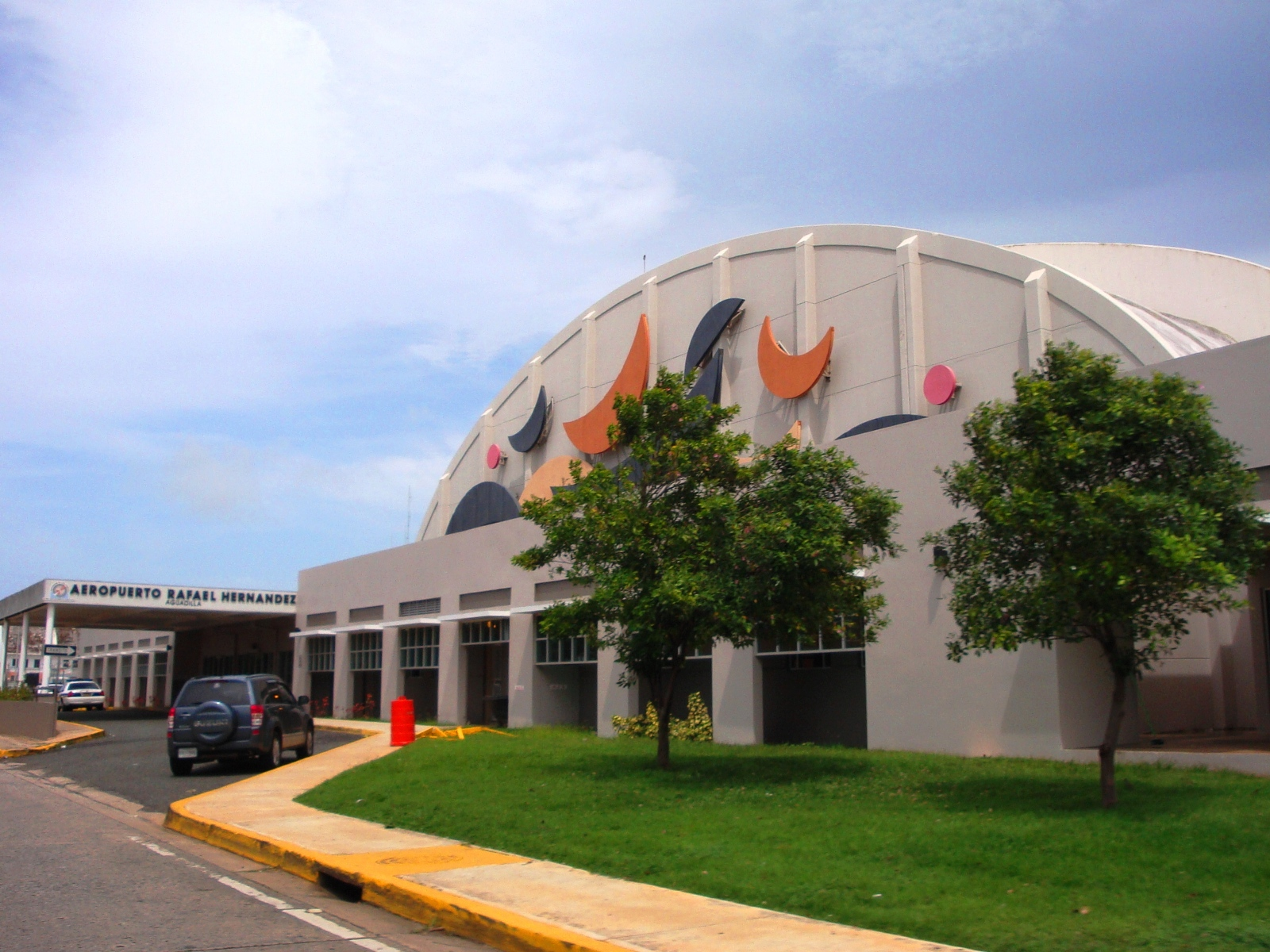
- Passenger terminal entrance
- IATA: BQN; ICAO: TJBQ; FAA LID: BQN

Summary
- Airport type: Public
- Owner: Puerto Rico Ports Authority
- Serves: Aguadilla, Puerto Rico
- Location: Aguadilla, Puerto Rico
- Hub for: Ameriflight
- Elevation AMSL: 237 ft (72 m)
- Coordinates: 18°29′42″N 067°07′46″W
- Website: aeropuerto-aguadilla.com

Maps
- FAA airport diagram
- Interactive map of BQN

Runways
Direction	Length		Surface
Direction	ft	m	Surface
08/26	11,702	3,567	Asphalt/Concrete

Statistics (2024)
- Aircraft Operations: 44,065
- Passenger movement: 738,766
- Based aircraft: 37
- Source: FAA GCM Google Maps passengers from the Puerto Rico Ports Authority

Rafael Hernández Airport (Spanish: Aeropuerto Rafael Hernández, IATA: BQN, ICAO: TJBQ, FAA LID: BQN), also referred to as Rafael Hernández International Airport (Aeropuerto Internacional Rafael Hernández), is an airport located in the municipality of Aguadilla, Puerto Rico. Named after the composer Rafael Hernández Marín, it is the second-busiest airport of Puerto Rico in terms of passenger traffic, after Luis Muñoz Marín International Airport. It is also home to Coast Guard Air Station Borinquen and U.S. Customs and Border Protection Air and Marine Operations. Its 11,702 feet (2.2163 mi) long runway of the airport is the longest in the insular Caribbean.

In the past, the airport has been served by passenger air carriers operating scheduled jet service, including American Airlines, Arrow Air, Capitol Air, Continental Airlines, Kiwi International Airlines, Pan Am (II and III),Trans World Airlines (TWA), Southeast Airlines, Aeronaves de Puerto Rico, and Delta Connection, and also by Etihad Crystal Cargo and Turkish Airlines Cargo on the cargo airline side. Taesa flew in 1996 from Mexico City International Airport in Mexico City.

In 1985, Arrow Air operated domestic McDonnell Douglas DC-10 wide-body jet service on a once-a-week basis to Aguadilla from San Juan, and nonstop flights six days a week from New York JFK. Pan Am III flew jets between Aguadilla and San Juan in the early 2000s. Currently, although the airport lacks non-stop flights to Asia, it is the only airport in Puerto Rico served by an Asian commercial airline, in this case by Emirates Sky Cargo.

== History ==
In 1939, the Army sent Major George C. Kenney to Puerto Rico to conduct a preliminary survey of possible air base sites on Puerto Rico. He examined 42 sites and declared that Punta Borinquen the best site for a major air base. In September 1939, the government purchased 3,796 acres (1,536 ha) of sugar cane farms for military use, for $1,215,000. Later that year, Major Karl S. Axtater assumed command of what was to become Borinquen Army Air Field.

With the establishment of an independent United States Air Force in 1947, the complex was renamed Ramey Air Force Base in 1948. Ramey AFB was home to a Strategic Air Command bombardment wing and housed a number of B-36 Peacemaker intercontinental bombers. The B-36s were later replaced by B-52 Stratofortress heavy bombers and KC-135 Stratotanker aerial refueling aircraft.

A tenant weather reconnaissance squadron operated WB-47 Stratojet and WC-130 Hercules aircraft. Due to the size and weight of the B-36, the runway at Ramey had to be built to a length of 11,702 feet (3,567 m) and a width of 200 feet (61 m), added an 870 feet (270 m) Blast Pad at each end and a 50 feet (15 m) shoulder on each side.

In 1971, the closure of what became Ramey Air Force Base began and lasted until 1973. Following its closure, it was converted into a civilian airport. It used to receive domestic commercial flights by Prinair and Vieques Air Link as well as service from New York JFK with Capitol Air, and Boeing 720 passenger flights from Miami operated by Southeast Airlines. It is also noted for being the place that the large clothing company, Wrangler Jeans, used to land their planes filled with company-related cargo as part of their airline operation, Wrangler Aviation, which was later renamed to Sky Lease Cargo.

In the mid and late 1970s, the Ahrens Aircraft Corporation attempted to set up operations at former USAF industrial facilities at the airport in order to manufacture the Ahrens AR 404 regional airliner, a short takeoff and landing (STOL) turboprop aircraft, with financial incentives promised by the Puerto Rican government for development. A government investigation over these incentives ensued and the project was cancelled after only two AR 404s were built at Rafael Hernández Airport.

In 2004, the Puerto Rico Ports Authority announced that it would be remodeling and expanding BQN to accommodate more flights and passengers. An expansion of the terminal building and a new parking lot were opened in July 2005.

Since the closure of Ramey AFB in 1974, the airport's control tower had remained standing, but was non-operational, limiting the airport to UNICOM communication as an uncontrolled airport. Following refurbishment of the former USAF control tower in 2006 and 2007, the newly renovated control tower became operational in July 2007.

In February 2012, the mayor of Aguadilla and the U.S. Secretary of Commerce designated the airport a "free trade zone" (FTZ), as are many other airports in the U.S., to improve the development of the airport and surrounding areas.

In April 2014, Lufthansa Technik announced the creation of a maintenance, repair and overhaul center (MRO) at the airport. This created operations for maintenance of Lufthansa Aircraft flying on the Americas, starting with 2 reconditioning lines by C and D checks for the Airbus A320, with plans to expand up to 5 reconditioning lines.

=== Passenger service ===
In 1988, Carnival Airlines and ATA began passenger jet service. In the 1990s, American Airlines, joined those two airlines, followed by Pan Am II and TWA. Carnival Airlines operated Airbus A300 wide-body jet service to New York JFK, Neward and Fort Lauderdale. In the early 1990s, Carnival Airlines operated the first intra-Puerto Rican jet service from the airport to Ponce with Boeing 727s as well as with wide body Airbus A300s.

Another carrier, Prinair previously conducted operations at Rafael Hernández Airport. North Cay Airways provided passenger air service from San Juan at some time during the airport's history. In 1995, American Airlines was operating daily nonstop Boeing 757-200 jet service to New York JFK airport. Carnival Airlines flew nonstop to JFK at this same, with Boeing 727-200 jet service three days a week.

In 2000, North American Airlines had reopened passenger service with a non-stop flight to New York JFK three times a week. Later, Continental Airlines joined North American with a daily flight to their hub in Newark. Continental has since merged with United Airlines, and the latter airline has continued to provide service. Boston-Maine Airways operating as Pan Am began jet service to Orlando Sanford International Airport in Florida and to Santo Domingo.

In 2005, JetBlue began a daily flight to their hub at New York JFK. Soon after the arrival of JetBlue, North American ceased operations. As a result, JetBlue announced that it would add a second daily flight to New York JFK.

In 2006, Delta Connection began regional jet service to Atlanta, Georgia, five times a week, although this service ended on January 20, 2007, as part of Delta's restructuring plan. Later in 2007, JetBlue began service to Orlando International Airport in Florida.

In the summer of 2007, Spirit Airlines announced plans to begin service from the airport to their hub in Fort Lauderdale, with a flight five times a week during the summer. It then reduced its service frequency to a flight two times a week.

In 2007, there were 59 flights per week including one daily flight to New York City, one to Newark and Orlando, and a flight operated five times per week to Fort Lauderdale.

Spirit increased their flight frequency to daily to and from Fort Lauderdale. In addition, Spirit added a daily non-stop service to Orlando in February 2008. JetBlue continued to have two daily flights to New York City after the holiday season, adding a second daily flight to and from Orlando on May 1, 2008. On June 2, 2008, Pan Am World Airways Dominicana restored service between the airport and Santo Domingo-Las Americas as well as to Punta Cana in the Dominican Republic.

In May 2022, Frontier Airlines launched service for the first time to and from Orlando International Airport. The new service operates three to four times weekly and marks the airline's 13th route serving Puerto Rico from destinations in the U.S. and the Caribbean.

Spirit eventually stopped all flights from Aguadilla in 2023.

== Facilities ==
Rafael Hernández Airport covers an area of 1600 acres (647 ha). BQN has one runway, 8/26: 11,702 ft x 200 ft (3,567 m x 61 m) Asphalt/Concrete.

=== North Side ===
The north side of the airport consists of a passenger terminal with an international side capable of handling flights of over 200 passengers. It also hosts the Main Cargo Terminal, the FedEx Terminal, and the General Aviation Terminal. The north side also houses the Copeca Jet Center Executive Terminal, and five service hangars.

The military side of the airport is also located on the north side, housing Coast Guard Air Station Borinquen, a United States Coast Guard facility, as well as the 141st Air Control Squadron (which operates at the Punta Borinquen Radar Station), a non-flying unit of the Puerto Rico Air National Guard. Many Federal law enforcement agencies such as the U.S. Customs and Border Protection, the US Border Patrol Ramey Sector in Map and the CBP Air and Marine Operations Operating Locations Southeast Region Caribbean Air and Marine Branch based their operations on this side of the airport.

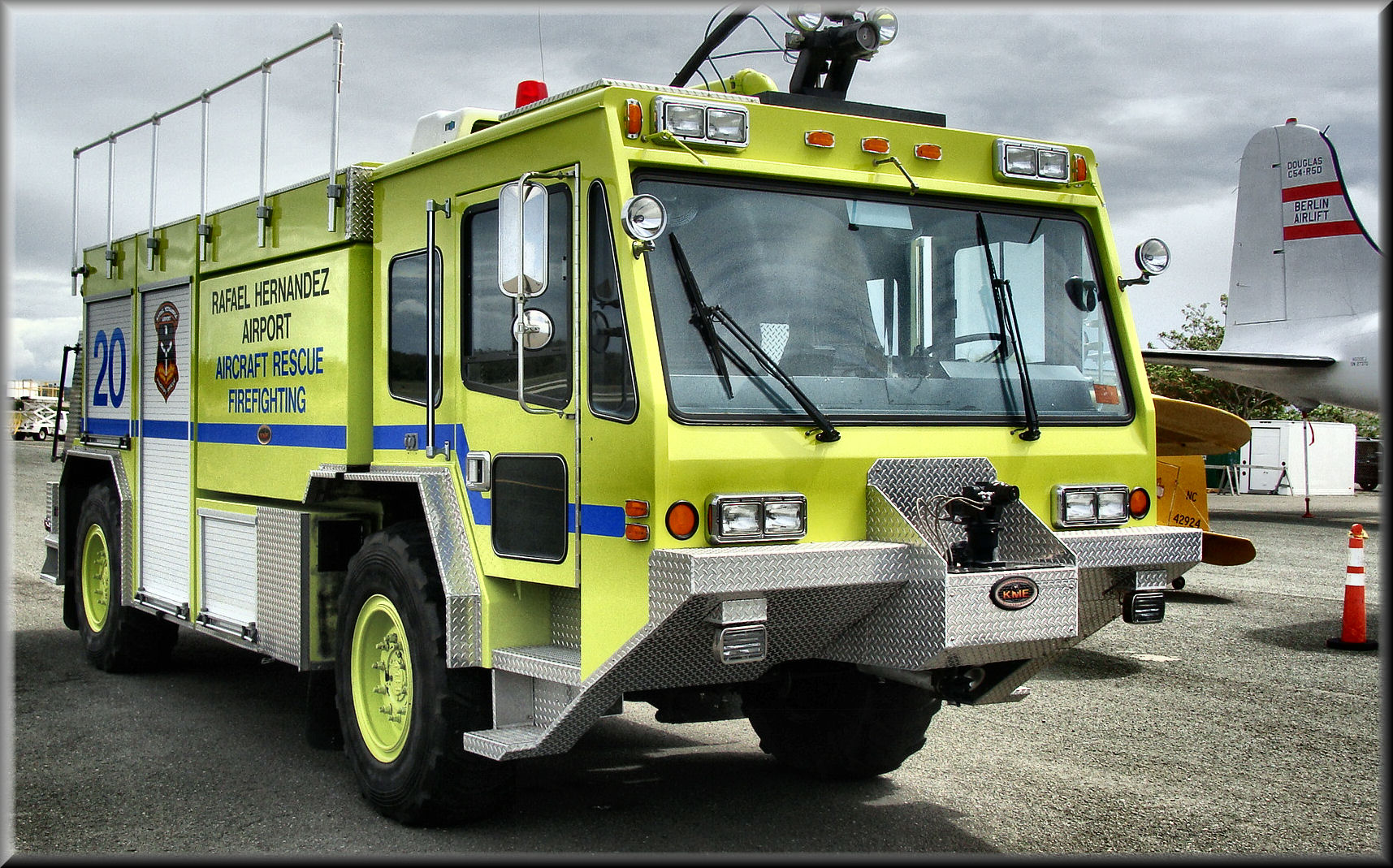
A Rafael Hernandez Airport Aircraft Rescue Firefighting truck in 2009

The closure of what became Ramey Air Force Base began in 1971 and lasted until 1973. Following its closure, it was converted into a civilian airport. It used to receive domestic commercial flights by Prinair and Vieques Air Link as well as service from JFK International Airport in New York City with Capitol Air, and 707 passenger flights from Miami with Southeast Airlines. It is also noted for being the place that the large clothing company, Wrangler Jeans used to land their planes filled with company-related cargo as part of their airline operation, Wrangler Aviation, which was later renamed to Sky Lease Cargo.

In the mid and late 1970s, the Ahrens Aircraft Corporation attempted to set up operations at former USAF industrial facilities at the airport in order to manufacture the Ahrens AR 404 regional airliner, a short takeoff and landing (STOL) turboprop aircraft, with financial incentives promised by the Puerto Rican government for development. A government investigation over these incentives ensued, and the project was cancelled after only two AR 404s were built at Rafael Hernández Airport.

In 2004, the Puerto Rico Ports Authority announced that it would be remodeling and expanding BQN to accommodate more flights and passengers. An expansion of the terminal building and a new parking lot were opened in July 2005.

Since the closure of Ramey AFB in 1974, the airport's control tower had remained standing, but was non-operational, limiting the airport to UNICOM communication as an uncontrolled airport. Following refurbishment of the former USAF control tower in 2006 and 2007, the newly renovated control tower became operational in July 2007.

In February 2012, the mayor of Aguadilla and the U.S. Secretary of Commerce designated the airport a "free trade zone" (FTZ), as are many other airports in the U.S., to improve the development of the airport and surrounding areas.

In April 2014, Lufthansa Technik announced the creation of a maintenance, repair and overhaul center (MRO) at the airport. This created operations for maintenance of Lufthansa Aircraft flying on the Americas, starting with 2 reconditioning lines by C and D checks for the Airbus A320, with plans to expand up to 5 reconditioning lines.

=== South Side ===
The south side of the airport is the largest portion of the airport, but is currently undeveloped. Since the airport was transferred from the U.S. Air Force and the General Services Administration (GSA) to Puerto Rico Port Authority in 1973, the south side has been the object of various disputes and competing political campaign promises by local elected officials and local political candidates.

Despite such promises over the past four decades, the south side remains undeveloped. Under the administration of Sila M. Calderón and Aníbal Acevedo Vilá, a master plan was conceived to turn the south side into an air cargo hub for the Caribbean, but local residents objected to the use of the south side for cargo rather than a modern passenger terminal.

=== Passenger Terminal ===
The passenger terminal was upgraded to include air conditioning, more space for modern airline ticket counters and car rental counters. It consists of two gates, Gate 14 and Gate 15. Gate 15 is used for departures while Gate 14 is used for arrivals. The terminal is divided into two sections, domestic and the international, with the domestic side equipped with a United States Department of Agriculture facility, while the international side contains a United States Customs inspection facility.

=== Cargo Terminal ===
The cargo section of the airport is divided in two sections, the Main Terminal and the FedEx Terminal. The FedEx Terminal is home to FedEx and its local affiliates. The remaining Cargo Carriers are located in the Main Terminal.

The U.S Coast Guard and various reserve components of the Armed Forces maintain a military presence within the former Air Force base. Many Federal law enforcement agencies such as the U.S. Customs and Border Protection, the United States Border Patrol Ramey sector and the CBP Air and Marine Operations Caribbean Branch operate at the airport.

== Future expansion ==
A January 2010, news report stated that the Federal Aviation Administration (FAA) approved a master plan to redevelop the Rafael Hernández Airport in Aguadilla that would involve an investment of $1 billion over the next 20 years. In 2010, the Aguadilla airport had two commercial passenger gates. The master plan calls for a total of 30 commercial passenger gates.

There are also plans to expand the airport access road.

There are plans to renovate the runway to coincide with FedEx's expansion. There are plans to add a second runway.

In June 2021, an expansion plan was announced by the Puerto Rico Ports Authority and paid by the FAA. The expansion plan includes building a new runway to replace the current one completed by 2027 as the current runway has only five years left of service, having been built in the 1930s for World War II.

Aside from the new runway, a new passenger terminal and three new cargo warehouses are planned to be built. The Puerto Rico Ports Authority seeks to bring back airlines with the new expansion. There are also plans to renovate the airport's facilities including bathrooms, relocating stores, adding jet bridges and more.

== Airlines and destinations ==
=== Passenger ===
Airlines	Destinations	Refs
Avelo Airlines	Lakeland, New Haven	
Frontier Airlines	Orlando	
JetBlue	Fort Lauderdale, New York–JFK, Orlando	
United Airlines	Newark	

=== Cargo ===
As of September 2025, the following cargo airlines which operate at the airport:

Airlines	Destinations
Air Cargo Carriers	San Juan, Santiago de los Caballeros
Ameriflight	Barbados, Castries, Fort-de-France, Port of Spain, St. Kitts, San Juan
Emirates Sky Cargo	Amsterdam, Quito
FedEx Express	Campinas, Memphis, San José (CR), Santo Domingo–Las Américas
FedEx Feeder	Castries, Port of Spain, Santiago de los Caballeros, Santo Domingo–Las Américas

== Statistics ==
This table shows the continuous growth of passenger traffic at the airport since 2001, but affected in 2009 by the lack of new flights. In 2007, the airport transported 400,473 passengers, nearly a 500% increase in five years. Rafael Hernández Airport has an average of 47 regular passengers flights per week.

Passenger statistics for BQN
Year	Passengers	% Change	Year	Passengers	% Change	Year	Passengers	% Change
2001	75,754	–	2010	490,103	▲6.2%	2019	753,996	▲23.9%
2002	80,018	▲5.6%	2011	471,226	▼3.9%	2020	149,162	▼80.2%
2003	132,668	▲65.8%	2012	432,651	▼8.2%	2021	461,227	▲209.2%
2004	230,976	▲74.1%	2013	407,664	▼5.8%	2022	699,525	▲51.7%
2005	253,730	▲9.9%	2014	428,413	▲5.1%	2023	869,942	▲24.4%
2006	356,145	▲40.4%	2015	412,565	▼3.7%	2024	738,766	▼15.1%
2007	400,473	▲12.4%	2016	519,603	▲25.9%	2025	686,057	▼7.1%
2008	492,180	▲22.9%	2017	498,424	▼4.1%	2026		
2009	461,506	▼6.2%	2018	608,352	▲22.1%	2027		

Carrier shares (May 2025 – April 2026)
Carrier	Passengers (arriving and departing)
JetBlue Airways	392,000(60.28%)
Frontier Airlines	146,000(22.53%)
United Airlines	112,000(17.19%)

Top U.S. passenger destinations (departing only) (May 2025 – April 2026)
Rank	City	Airport	Passengers	Carriers
1	Orlando, Florida	Orlando International Airport (MCO)	149,910	Frontier, JetBlue
2	New York City, New York	John F. Kennedy International Airport (JFK)	73,710	JetBlue
3	Newark, New Jersey	Newark Liberty International Airport (EWR)	56,070	United
4	Fort Lauderdale, Florida	Fort Lauderdale – Hollywood International Airport (FLL)	41,700	JetBlue

== Access ==
The airport can be accessed via two highways from PR-2.

- Arecibo and points east including Isabela and Camuy are connected to the airport via PR-110.
- Mayagüez and points south including downtown Aguadilla, Rincon, and Cabo Rojo are connected to the airport via PR-107.

== Accidents and incidents ==
- On June 4, 1946, a USAAF Douglas C-47 crashed 1.5 miles (2.4 km) ESE of then Ramey AFB while practicing single-engine landings. Three out of the four occupants on board were killed.
- On May 3, 1960, a Navegação Aérea Brasileira (NAB) Curtiss C-46 Commando crashed into a small hill on approach to Ramey AFB on a delivery flight from Miami. All five occupants were killed.
- On May 10, 1991, a Douglas DC-3 of Four Star Air Cargo crashed shortly after takeoff due to an engine malfunction and pilot error, causing the aircraft to stall. Both occupants died.
- On February 3, 1992, a C-54 of Dominican airline Aerolineas Mundo-AMSA had a runway collision with a Lockheed Super Constellation, suffering a fire and being damaged beyond repair.
- On August 7, 2002, a C-130 Hercules had taken off from BQN before crashing in Caguas, killing all 10 occupants.
- On August 30, 2013, a Martinair Cargo MD-11 aircraft, taking off for a flight to London Stansted Airport, suffered an engine fire and had to abort the takeoff. There were no injuries to the plane's crew, but the airplane suffered substantial damage to the number one engine, nacelle and aircraft's structure.
- On July 11, 2024, a Cessna 402B aircraft that belonged to WJ Medical Consulting took off from Aguadilla to Isla Grande Airport in San Juan. Five minutes later, it was observed losing altitude near San Antonio barrio. The airplane attempted to do an emergency landing at Aguadilla airport, but it crashed, killing its pilot, 47 year old Wilfredo Juarbe Saldana. A man who was riding a bicycle near the place where the plane crashed was also injured when the crash's impact caused him to land on a street nearby. According to Primera Hora newspaper, there was one passenger on the aircraft, and that passenger was uninjured. According to the Aviation Safety Network, however, there was no passenger on board the aircraft.

== See also ==
- Transportation in Puerto Rico
- List of airports in Puerto Rico
