= Key West International Airport =

International airport in Key West, Florida

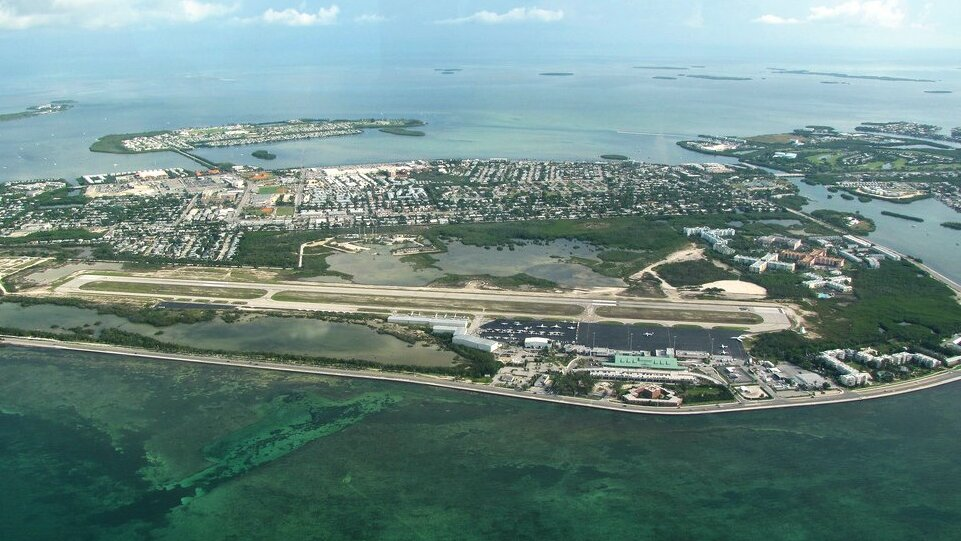
- Aerial view of Key West International Airport
- IATA: EYW; ICAO: KEYW; FAA LID: EYW; WMO: 72201

Summary
- Airport type: Public
- Owner/Operator: Monroe County
- Serves: Key West, Florida
- Elevation AMSL: 3 ft (0.91 m)
- Coordinates: 24°33′22″N 81°45′34″W
- Website: eyw.com

Maps
- FAA airport diagram
- Interactive map of Key West International Airport

Runways
Direction	Length		Surface
Direction	ft	m	Surface
09/27	5,076	1,547	Asphalt

Statistics (2025)
- Total Passengers: 1,477,226 ▲1.9%
- Enplanements: 743,076
- Deplanements: 734,150
- Source: Federal Aviation Administration

Key West International Airport (IATA: EYW, ICAO: KEYW, FAA LID: EYW) is an airport located in the City of Key West in Monroe County, Florida, United States, 2 miles (3.2 km; 1.7 nmi) east of the main commercial center of Key West.

The relatively short 5,076-foot-long (1,547 m) runway limits the maximum size of aircraft that can serve the airport, along with restricting the weight of flights departing.

== History ==
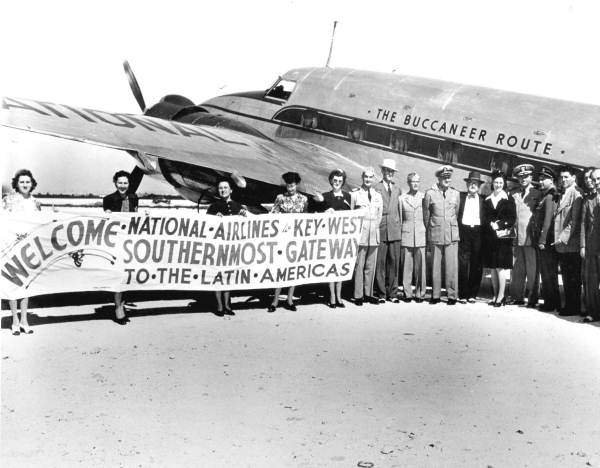
The first scheduled service between Miami and Key West was by National Airlines on February 10, 1944

Key West's aviation history began in 1913 with a flight to Cuba by Augustin Parla. In 1928, Pan American Airways began scheduled flights from Key West. The main runway at Meacham Field was pressed into U.S. Army use after the Pearl Harbor attack, as well as into U.S. Navy use later in World War II as an alternative to the Trumbo Point seaplane base and the main Naval Air Station for fixed-wing and lighter-than-air (blimp) aircraft on Boca Chica Key. After the war, the city took over what became Key West Municipal Airport. In January 1953, the city gave Monroe County the title to Meacham Field, allowing the county to apply for Federal Aviation Administration grants. Around the same time, the airport became Key West International Airport.

National Airlines began flights to Miami in 1944 with Lockheed Lodestar twin prop aircraft, although the airport did not have a paved runway until around 1956. National served Key West for nearly 25 years and later operated Convair 340 and Convair 440 prop aircraft, as well as Lockheed L-188 Electra turboprops, into the airport. In 1968, National began the first jet flights into Key West with Boeing 727-100s, providing nonstop service to Miami. By 1969, National was operating daily 727 jet service direct to Washington National Airport, Philadelphia International Airport, and John F. Kennedy International Airport via intermediate stops in Miami, West Palm Beach, and Orlando.

Several other airlines also began operating jet service into Key West. In 1979, Air Florida was operating five nonstop flights a day to Miami with Boeing 737 jetliners. In 1987, Eastern Airlines was operating daily mainline Boeing 727-100 jet service nonstop to Miami. By 1989, Piedmont Airlines was operating six nonstop flights a day to Miami with Fokker F28 Fellowship twin jets. This F28 jet service was then continued by USAir following its acquisition of and merger with Piedmont.

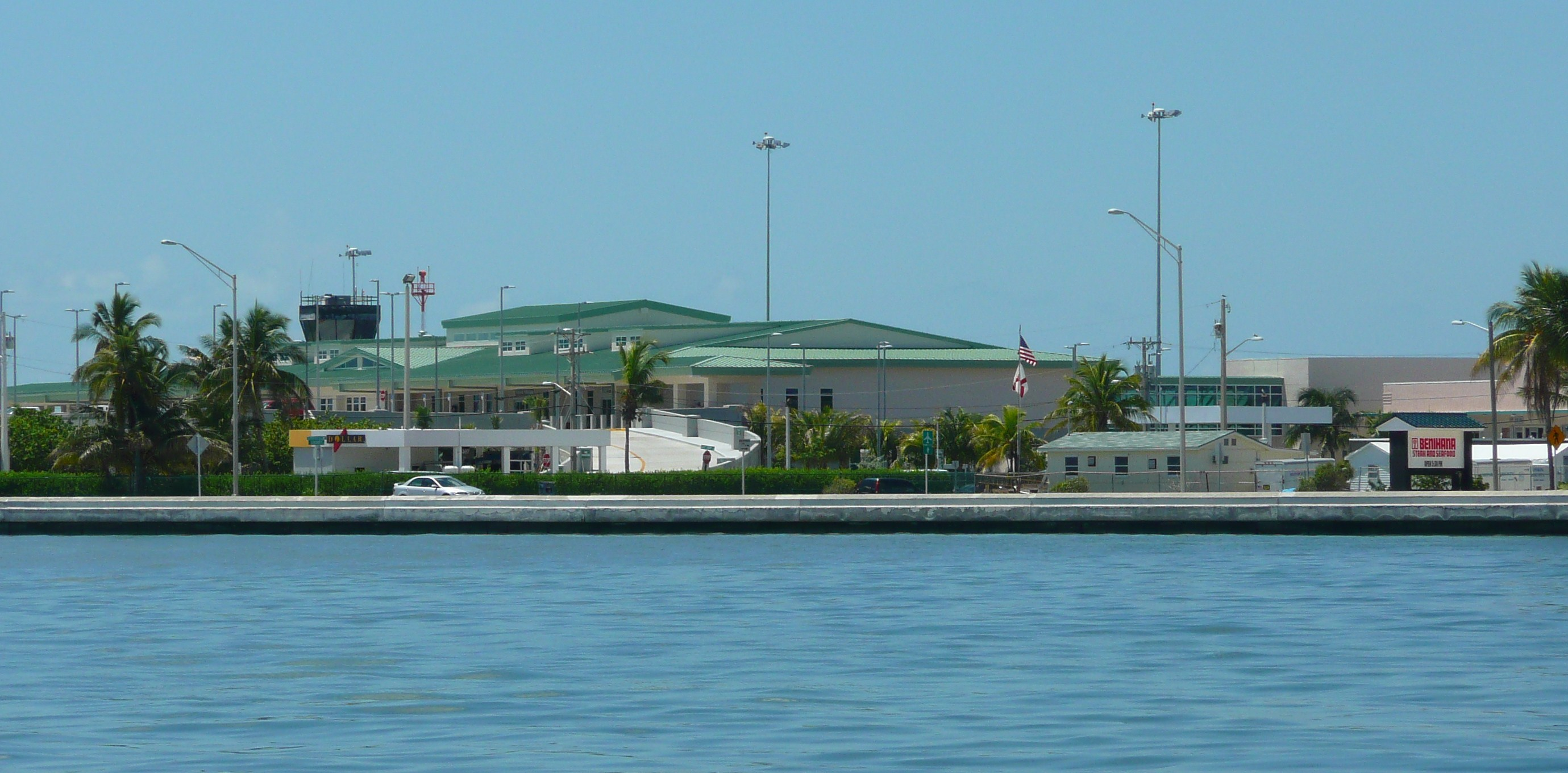
The terminal as seen from the Atlantic Ocean

A number of commuter and regional airlines also served Key West with turboprop and prop aircraft during the 1970s and 1980s primarily with nonstop flights to Miami but also with nonstop service to Fort Lauderdale, Naples, and Tampa. According to the Official Airline Guide (OAG), these air carriers included Air Florida Commuter, Dolphin Airlines, Gull Air, Jetstream International Airlines, Pro Air Services, Provincetown-Boston Airlines (and its successor Bar Harbor Airlines), Southeast Airlines, and Southern Express. Turboprop aircraft operated into the airport included the British Aerospace BAe Jetstream 31, Beechcraft 1900C, Beechcraft 1900D, Beechcraft C99, CASA 212 Aviocar, Embraer EMB-110 Bandeirante, Embraer EMB-120 Brasilia, Nord 262 and Saab 340. Piston engine twin prop aircraft flown by commuter air carriers serving Key West included the Douglas DC-3, Martin 4-0-4, and Piper Navajo.

Delta Connection carrier Comair began service to Delta Air Lines' hub in Orlando in 1988 and also briefly had service to Tampa and Fort Lauderdale as well. American Eagle Airlines began service from Key West to American Airlines' hub in Miami in 1989. American Eagle operated Saab 340 and ATR-72 propjets into the airport before introducing regional jet service in the 2010s.

By the early 1990s, both USAir and Eastern Air Lines ended jet service to Key West, and all commercial service to Key West would be operated by propeller aircraft for the rest of the decade. In 1993, Cape Air began service to Key West with flights to Naples using Cessna 402s. Service expanded in 1996 with flights to Fort Lauderdale and Fort Myers (the latter of which continued operating until 2013). Other airlines operating at Key West in the early 1990s included Airways International (with flights to Fort Lauderdale and Miami), Pan Am Express (with flights to Miami), Paradise Island Airlines (operating code sharing service for Carnival Air Lines to Fort Lauderdale), and USAir Express (later known as US Airways Express with flights to Miami and Tampa).

Gulfstream International Airlines also began service to Key West in the early 1990s with flights to Miami and Tampa. Gulfstream would later operate as Continental Connection, the regional brand of the now-defunct Continental Airlines. Gulfstream then rebranded as Silver Airways.

In 2002, Delta Connection carrier Atlantic Southeast Airlines began regional jet service to Delta's hub in Atlanta. This brought jet service back to Key West as well as Key West's first non-stop flight to a destination outside of Florida since 1961. Delta Connection's service to Orlando was also upgraded to regional jets at the same time, though Orlando service was discontinued by 2008.

Main line jet service returned to Key West in 2009 when AirTran Airways, Key West's first low-cost carrier, started flights to Orlando International Airport on Boeing 737-700s. Around the same time, Delta Air Lines upgraded some of their Atlanta flights to main line service on Boeing 737s. The airport's runway, which was 4,801 feet (1,463 m) at the time, was the shortest runway to be regularly used by 737s in North America.

AirTran later added flights to Tampa in 2011. By the end of 2012, Southwest Airlines took over AirTran's flights to Orlando and Tampa as part of the merger of the two airlines. Southwest also added service to New Orleans in March 2013. However, in 2014, Southwest discontinued all service to the airport.

On July 15, 2017, Key West International Airport was awarded a grant of $6.5 million by the FAA to assist in a $10 million runway project. The project added 227 feet (69 m) to the runway for takeoffs and landings as well as added 10-foot (3.0 m)-wide shoulders paved on each side of the runway. Construction work began in January 2018 and all construction was done at night.

== Facilities ==
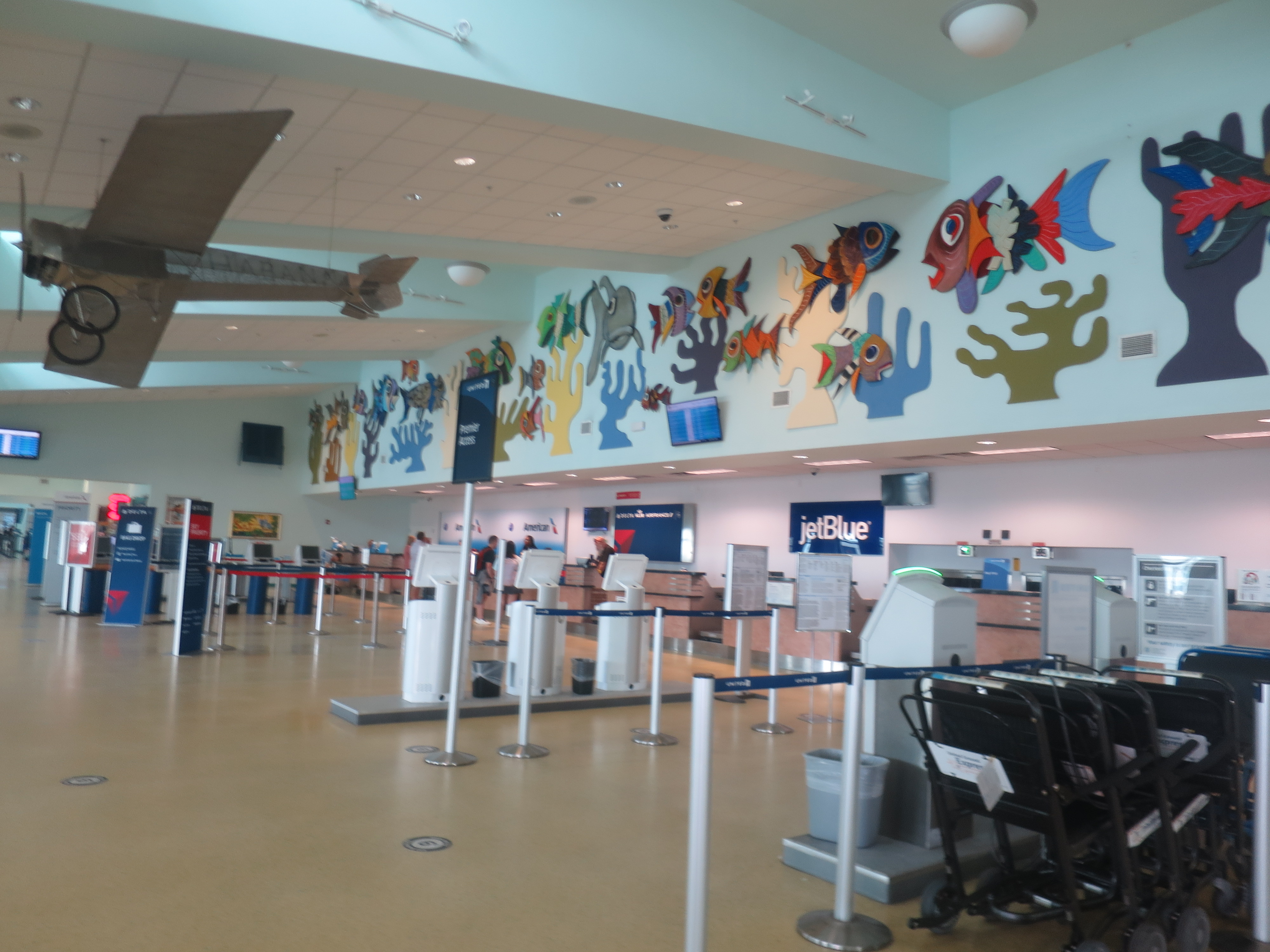
Ticketing hall

Key West International Airport covers 334 acres (135 ha) at an elevation of 3 feet (1 m). Its one runway, 09/27, is 5,076 feet long and 100 feet wide (1,547 x 30 m) and has an asphalt surface.

The length of the runway limits the size of aircraft that can serve the airport. Currently the largest aircraft that serve the airport are the Airbus A319 and the similarly sized Boeing 737-700, both shortened variants of the popular narrow-body mainline aircraft. Additionally, flights departing from EYW often have weight restrictions.

=== Terminal ===
Key West International Airport has one terminal with multiple connected buildings and a single 8-gate concourse. Part of the terminal was designed by Mark Mosko and Dwane Stark of URS; Mosko also worked on Baltimore–Washington International Airport.

The ground level of the terminal building, which currently contains baggage claim and passenger pick-up, opened in 1957 and it originally contained all passenger functions and services.

In February 2009, the terminal was expanded with the addition of a second building elevated over the parking lot. With an area of about 30,000 square feet (2,800 m^{2}), it more than doubled the airport's terminal space. The 2009 building includes an elevated roadway and houses ticketing, check-in, and the airport's security checkpoint. It was connected to the original building via an elevated walkway. The 1957 building was then renovated with the former ticketing area becoming an expanded departure gate lounge, and the baggage claim area was then expanded into the original departure lounge.

In November 2022, the airport began construction on a new $98.8 million passenger concourse. This concourse is nearly 50,000 square feet (4,600 m^{2}) in size and features an expanded departures area with eight jet bridges; it is also capable of withstanding hurricane-force winds. The concourse opened to the public on April 14, 2025.

The next phase of the expansion, which is expected to be completed by the summer of 2026, will including a larger security checkpoint and the conversion of the previous departure lounge into additional baggage claim space.

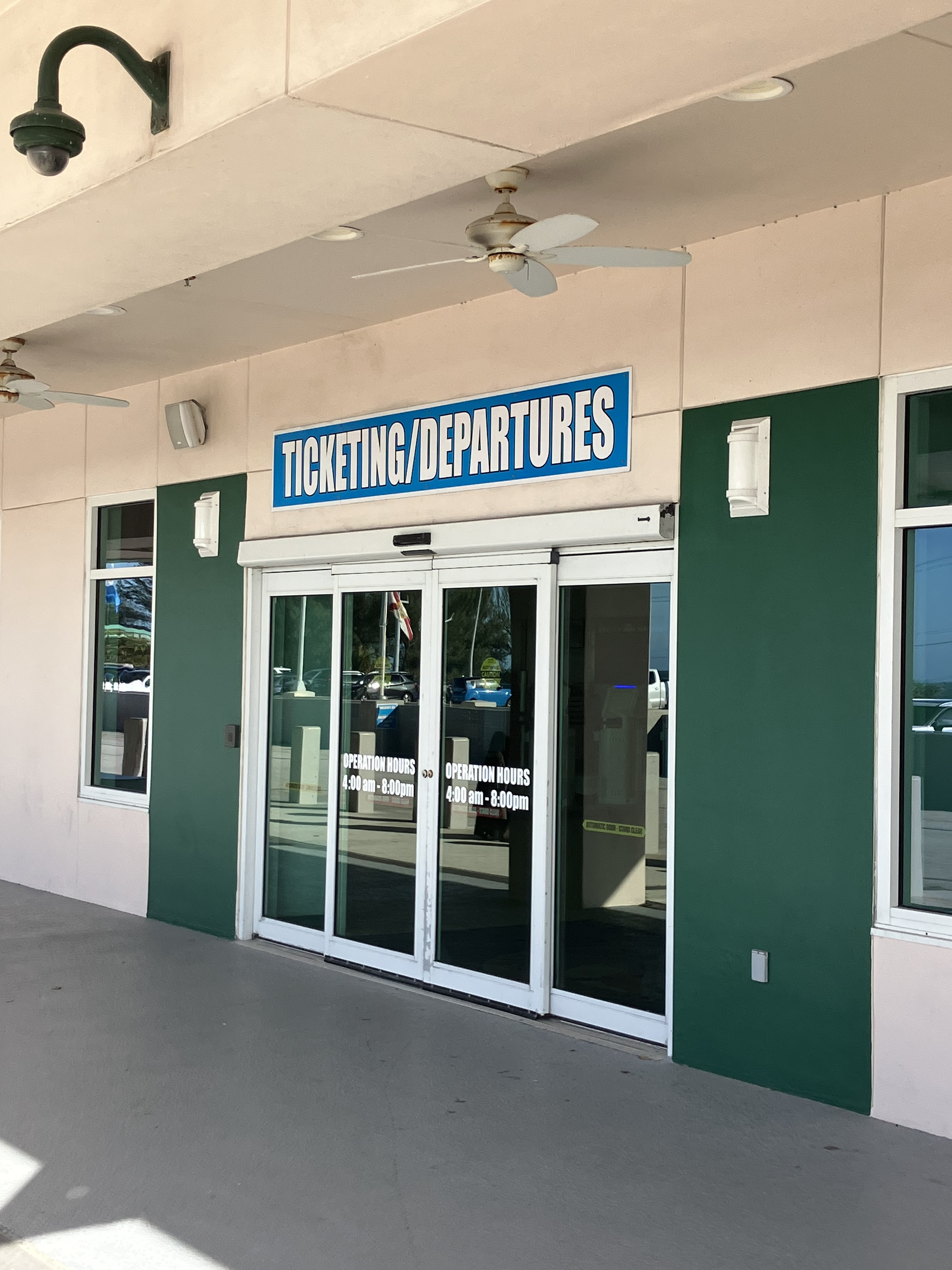
Key West Airport terminal entrance

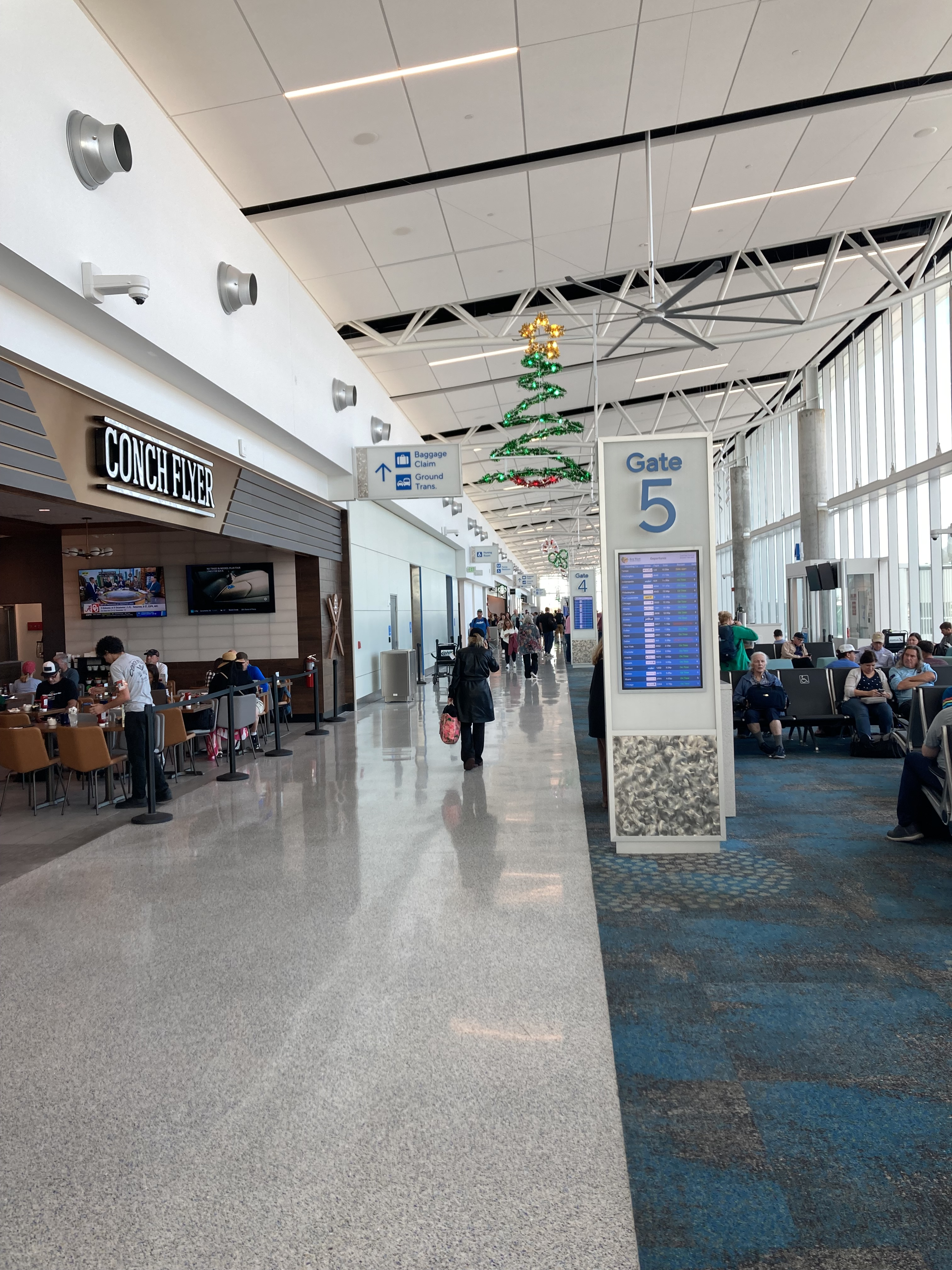
The new terminal at the Key West Airport

Parking for 300 vehicles is at ground level beneath the ticketing building with 150 spaces for rental cars and 150 for the public.

== Airlines and destinations ==
=== Passenger ===
Airlines	Destinations
Allegiant Air	Asheville, Cincinnati, Indianapolis, Knoxville, Orlando/Sanford, Pittsburgh, St. Petersburg/Clearwater; Seasonal: Columbus–Rickenbacker
American Airlines	Charlotte, Dallas/Fort Worth, Philadelphia
American Eagle	Charlotte, Miami, Washington–National; Seasonal: Boston, Chicago–O'Hare, New York–LaGuardia, Philadelphia
Avelo Airlines	Seasonal: New Haven
Breeze Airways	Orlando, Raleigh/Durham, Tampa
Delta Air Lines	Atlanta
Delta Connection	Atlanta; Seasonal: New York–LaGuardia
JetBlue	Seasonal: Boston
United Airlines	Newark; Seasonal: Chicago–O'Hare
United Express	Newark; Seasonal: Chicago–O'Hare, Houston–Intercontinental, Washington–Dulles

=== Cargo ===
Airlines	Destinations
FedEx Feeder	Fort Lauderdale

== Statistics ==
=== Annual traffic ===
Key West's traffic was generally fairly stagnant to start the new millennium but gradually began increasing at the end of the 2000s with the addition of the new terminal and the introduction of low-cost jet service operated by AirTran, as well as mainline jet service by Delta.

When Southwest acquired AirTran in 2011, it continued to operate flights from the airport, first under the AirTran brand and then under the Southwest brand with Boeing 737-700 jetliners. Southwest Airlines ended service to Key West Airport in 2014.

Annual passenger traffic at EYW 2000–present
Year	Passengers
2000	292,508
2001	261,809
2002	272,440
2003	299,193
2004	298,790
2005	314,075
2006	294,047
2007	270,781
2008	231,339
2009	234,322
2010	287,359
2011	335,603
2012	370,637
2013	402,842
2014	383,776
2015	362,108
2016	380,505
2017	392,381
2018	870,237
2019	969,069
2020	641,876
2021	1,481,683
2022	1,421,011
2023	1,309,009
2024	1,449,649
2025	1,477,226

=== Top destinations ===
Busiest domestic routes from EYW (February 2025 – January 2026)
Rank	City	Passengers	Carriers
1	(Georgia (U.S. state)) Atlanta, Georgia	169,130	Delta
2	Charlotte, North Carolina	119,500	American
3	Miami, Florida	83,200	American
4	Philadelphia, Pennsylvania	43,590	American
5	Newark, New Jersey	36,270	United
6	Dallas/Fort Worth, Texas	36,980	American
7	Chicago–O'Hare, Illinois	35,770	American, United
8	(Washington, D.C.) Washington-National, DC	33,100	American
9	St. Petersburg/Clearwater, Florida	28,490	Allegiant
10	Tampa, Florida	26,660	Breeze

=== Airline market share ===
Largest airlines at EYW (February 2025 – January 2026)
Rank	Airline	Passengers	Share
1	American Airlines	335,000	22.74%
2	Delta Air Lines	334,000	22.66%
3	Envoy Air	254,000	17.26%
4	Allegiant Air	183,000	12.43%
5	Republic Airways	121,000	8.25%
	Other	245,000	16.67%

== Accidents and incidents ==
The remains of a Cubana Antonov An-24RV that was hijacked from Cuba in 2003

- On April 25, 1959, a Vickers Viscount of Cubana de Aviación was hijacked on a flight from Varadero to Havana. The aircraft landed at Key West.
- On October 29, 1960, a Douglas DC-3 of Cubana de Aviación was hijacked after takeoff from José Martí International Airport by the co-pilot and a gunfight ensued, killing an air marshall and forcing the aircraft to Key West airport. Nine persons were involved in the hijack and requested political asylum in the US along with two passengers.
- On March 18, 1994, a Grumman G-73 Mallard of Chalk's International Airlines on a ferry flight to Key West Airport, crashed on its initial climb out of Key West harbor due to the failure of the pilot in command to assume the bilges were adequately pumped free of water resulting in the aft center of gravity to be exceeded, failure of the aircrew to follow the checklist, and an existing water leak. Both occupants died.
- On March 19, 2003, Aerotaxi Flight 882, operated by Douglas DC-3C CU-T1192, was hijacked on a flight from Rafael Cabrera Airport in Nueva Gerona, Cuba to José Martí International Airport in Havana. The six hijackers were detained upon the plane's landing at Key West.
- On April 2, 2003, a Cubana de Aviación flight scheduled from Siguanea Airport to José Martí International Airport, operated by a Antonov An-24, was hijacked and landed in Key West. As of 2021, the plane had remained in Key West and was being used as a training facility for fire and police.
- On December 24, 2003, a Cessna 172RG experienced a gear collapse while landing at the Key West International Airport.
- On April 17, 2004 a Cessna 172 Skyhawk was damaged during landing at the Key West International Airport. The probable cause of the accident was found to be the pilot's failure to maintain directional control while landing in gusty wind conditions which resulted in the airplane departing the runway and impacting a sign, incurring damage.
- On March 26, 2006, a Piper PA-32 Cherokee Six ran off the runway and collapsed the nose landing gear during landing at Key West International Airport. The probable cause of the accident was found to be the pilot's failure to maintain directional control during the landing roll with a crosswind, resulting in collapse of the nose landing gear.
- On March 31, 2007, a Beechcraft Baron experienced a nosegear collapse while landing at the Key West International Airport. The probable cause of the accident was found to be a failure of the nose landing gear drag brace due to overload during landing rollout for undetermined reasons.
- On August 13, 2010, a Cessna 172 Skyhawk crashed while in the traffic pattern at the Key West International Airport. The accident occurred due to the non-instrument-rated pilot's spatial disorientation during night, over-water, low-ambient-light conditions, which resulted in the airplane impacting the ocean.
- On October 31, 2011, a Gulfstream G150 carrying NASCAR team owner Rick Hendrick ran off the end of Key West's runway after experiencing a loss in braking action upon landing. The jet, owned by NASCAR driver Jimmie Johnson, suffered nose gear damage.
- On November 2, 2011, a Cessna Citation crash landed in Key West. The flight, which originated in Fort Lauderdale, had a brake failure upon landing. Two pilots were on board along with two passengers. Only minor injuries were reported. The aircraft was stopped by the airport's newly installed EMAS system.
- On January 3, 2015, a Cessna P206 crashed while on short approach to Key West. The pilot reported he was 300 feet above the ground when the engine suddenly stopped. The reason for the loss of engine power could not be determined during postaccident examinations and testing.
- On March 15, 2018, a Cessna 177 Cardinal experienced a power loss just after departing Key West. The pilot maneuvered to avoid trees but struck power lines in the process. The cause of the partial power loss could not be determined because examination of the wreckage did not reveal any evidence of preimpact malfunctions or failures that would have precluded normal operation.

== See also ==
- List of airports in Florida
