= Aerolineas Mundo =

Dominican Republic cargo airline, 1986–1993

Aerolineas Mundo, S.A. AMSA
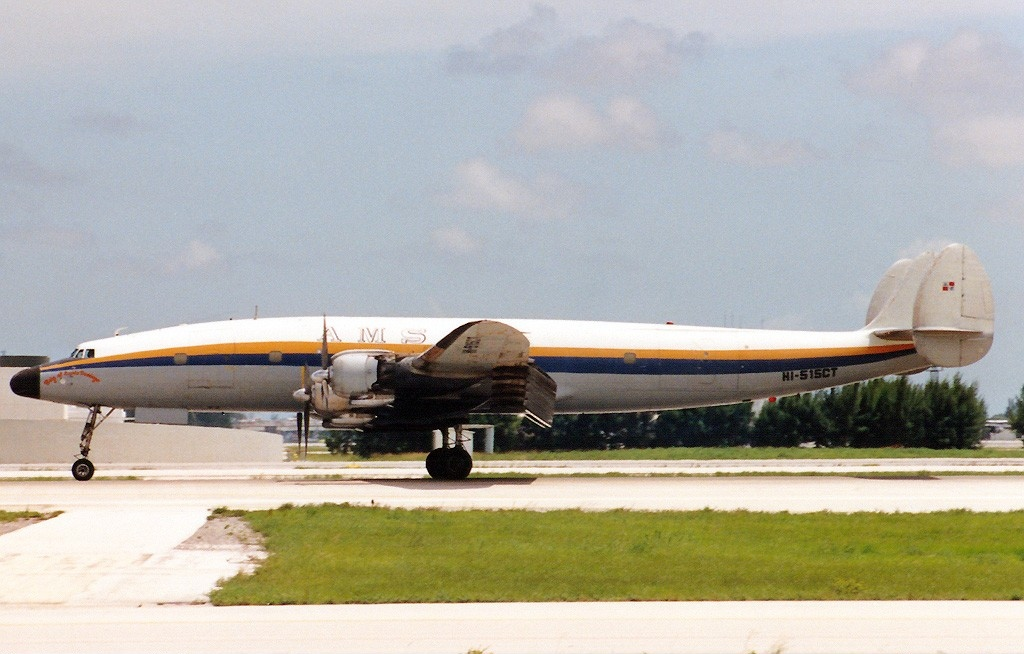
- AMSA Lockheed EC-121S Super Constellation (L-1049F)
- Founded: 1986
- Ceased operations: 1993
- Hubs: Las Americas International Airport
- Headquarters: Las Americas International Airport; Santo Domingo, Dominican Republic
- Key people: William Bailes Bachi, Filippo Deplana

Aerolineas Mundo S.A. (also known as AMSA) was a cargo airline that operated from 1986 to 1993 out of Las Americas International Airport in Santo Domingo, Dominican Republic.

== History ==
AMSA began as Air Mar Freighters in 1986, the creation of businessmen William Bailes Bachi and Filippo Deplana. AMSA flew various aircraft during its lifetime, including the C-54, DC-7, C-121, L-1049 and C-46.

== Incidents and accidents ==
- AMSA's co-owner, William Bailes Bachi, was killed in April 1990 when one of AMSA's aircraft had a ditching accident off Miami.
- On February 3, 1992, a C-54 of the airline had a runway collision at Rafael Hernandez Airport in Aguadilla, Puerto Rico with a Lockheed Super Constellation, suffering a fire and being damaged beyond repair.
