= Carnival Air Lines =

Airline of the United States (1988–1998)

| IATA | ICAO | Call sign |
|---|---|---|
| KW | CAA | CARNIVAL AIR |
- Founded: November 15, 1988
- Commenced operations: August 1989
- Ceased operations: February 26, 1998
- Hubs: Fort Lauderdale; Miami
- Fleet size: 35
- Destinations: 23
- Parent company: Carnival Corporation (1988–1997); Pan Am Corporation (1997–1998)
- Headquarters: Dania Beach, Florida, United States
- Key people: Micky Arison
- Employees: 1,350

Carnival Air Lines Incorporated was a charter and scheduled airline division of the Carnival Corporation that started in 1988 after Carnival Cruise Lines purchased Pacific Interstate Airlines. It was headquartered in Dania Beach, Florida.

== History ==
The origins of Carnival Air Lines can be traced to 1984 when Pacific Interstate Airlines was founded in Las Vegas, Nevada. This airline flew charters between Las Vegas and Los Angeles with a single Boeing 727-100 jetliner. In 1985, the name was changed to Pacific Inter Air and then two years later the name was changed to Bahamas ExPress. By this time, the airline was flying out of airports in the East Coast of the US to Freeport in the Bahamas. Carnival Cruise Lines bought the company in 1988 and the airline's name was once again changed to Fun Air, but its aircraft was never painted with that name and cruise ship passengers were flown under the name Majestic Air.

The final identity of Carnival Air Lines came to being in 1989 and began flying from Miami, the Northeast USA and later on expanded to other destinations, with its home base in Ft. Lauderdale, Florida. (See routes below).

In 1992, Carnival Air Lines began a code-share agreement with Iberia of Spain to transport connecting passengers from Madrid to Los Angeles via Carnival's Miami Hub. The route was originally operated by a Boeing 737-400 but was replaced in 1994 with Carnival's first Airbus A300B4. In 1993, Carnival began operating its first wide-body aircraft by flying Lan Chile's Boeing 767 as part of the interchange agreement with the Chilean airline. The exclusive route was from Miami to New York's JFK airport. In 1995, when the agreement with LAN-Chile was not renewed, another agreement was formed with Ladeco of Chile to transport connecting passengers from Santiago to New York via Carnival's Miami Hub flying a Carnival Airbus A300 in LADECO's livery.

In September 1997, Pan Am Corporation, a holding company formed by the reincarnated Pan American Airways, bought Carnival Air Lines in an attempt to bolster its fleet and operations into a new airline based on the old Pan Am. Before the airlines could fully merge, the holding company and its two independently operated airlines, Pan Am and Carnival, filed for bankruptcy protection and ceased scheduled flight operations in February 1998. The air operator's certificate used for the reincarnated Pan Am was abandoned in favor of the acquired Carnival operating certificate. Pan Am, now operating with the Carnival certificate, quickly resumed limited charter operations while new owner Guilford Transportation Industries of Massachusetts acquired certain assets of the bankrupt companies after court approval. The new company emerged from bankruptcy in June 1998 and discontinued the use of the Carnival brand name for the Pan Am name and logo instead. Guilford ceased operating Pan Am and relinquished its original Carnival airworthiness certificate on November 1, 2004.

== Destinations ==
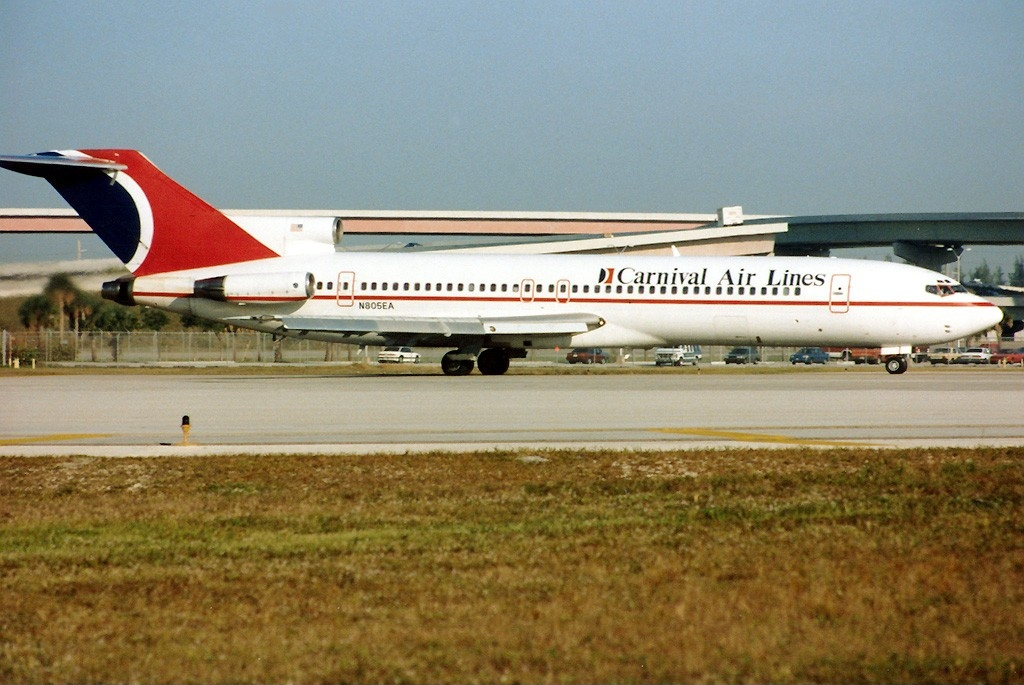
A Carnival Air Lines Boeing 727-200 at Fort Lauderdale–Hollywood International Airport in 1993.

Route map

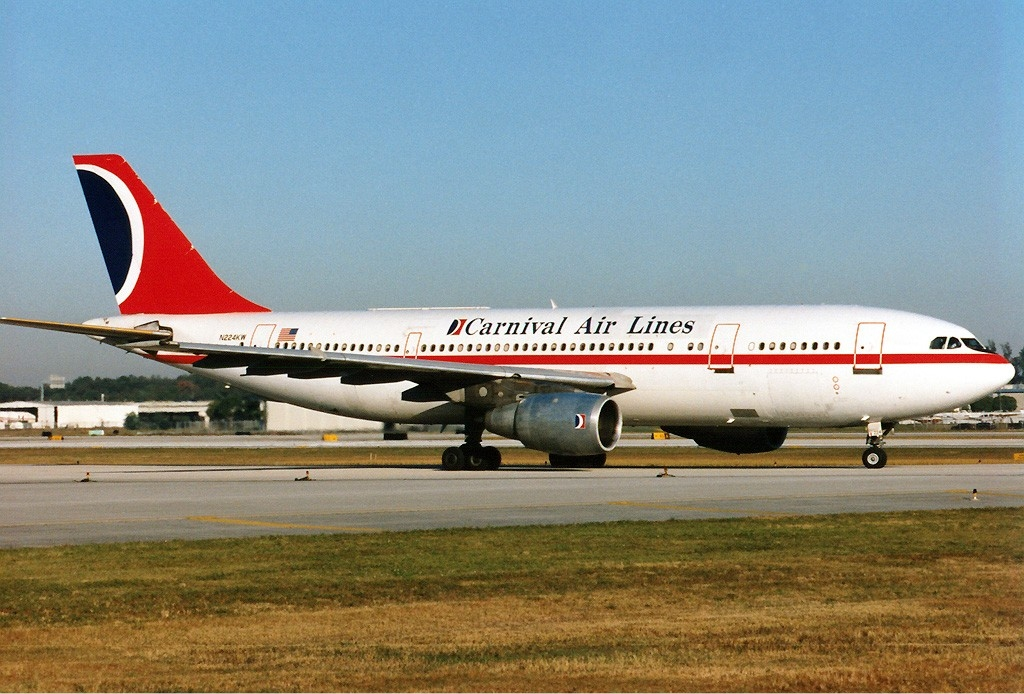
A Carnival Air Lines Airbus A300B4 taxiing at Fort Lauderdale–Hollywood International Airport in 1996.

During its ten-year existence, Carnival Air Lines flew to the following destinations:

=== Bahamas ===
- Nassau – Lynden Pindling International Airport
- Paradise Island – Paradise Island Airport (served solely by codeshare partner Paradise Island Airlines using its de Havilland Canada Dash 7 turboprop aircraft)

=== Dominican Republic ===
- Punta Cana – Punta Cana International Airport

=== Haiti ===
- Port-au-Prince – Toussaint Louverture International Airport

=== Turks and Caicos Islands ===
- Grand Turk – JAGS McCartney International Airport
- Providenciales – Providenciales International Airport

=== United States ===
- California
  - Los Angeles – Los Angeles International Airport
- Connecticut
  - Hartford – Bradley International Airport – seasonal service
- Florida
  - Fort Lauderdale – Fort Lauderdale–Hollywood International Airport – Hub (also served by codeshare partner Paradise Island Airlines)
  - Fort Myers – Southwest Florida International Airport (also served by codeshare partner Paradise Island Airlines using its de Havilland Canada Dash 7 turboprop aircraft)
  - Key West – Key West International Airport (served solely by codeshare partner Paradise Island Airlines using its de Havilland Canada Dash 7 turboprop aircraft)
  - Miami – Miami International Airport – Hub
  - Orlando – Orlando International Airport
  - Tampa – Tampa International Airport
  - West Palm Beach – Palm Beach International Airport (also served by codeshare partner Paradise Island Airlines using its de Havilland Canada Dash 7 turboprop aircraft)
- Massachusetts
  - Worcester – Worcester Regional Airport
- New Jersey
  - Newark – Newark Liberty International Airport
- New York
  - Islip – Long Island MacArthur Airport
  - Newburgh – Stewart International Airport – seasonal service
  - New York City
    - John F. Kennedy International Airport
    - LaGuardia Airport
  - White Plains – Westchester County Airport
- Puerto Rico
  - Aguadilla – Rafael Hernández Airport
  - Ponce – Mercedita Airport
  - San Juan – Luis Muñoz Marín International Airport
- Virginia
  - Washington, D.C. – Washington Dulles International Airport

== Fleet ==
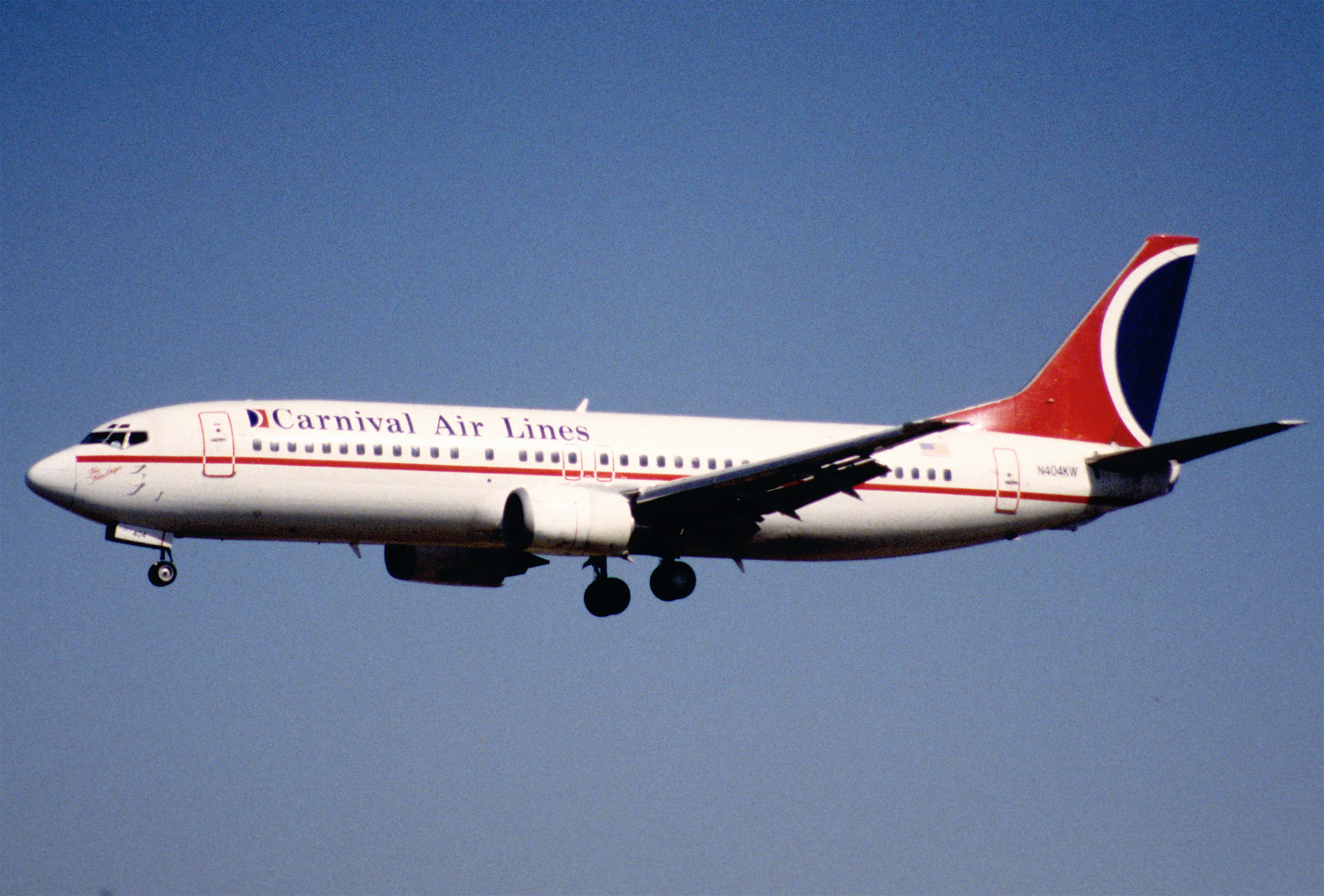
A Carnival Air Lines Boeing 737-400 at Fort Lauderdale/Hollywood International Airport in 1998

This is an extract found regarding the Carnival Air Lines fleet:

Carnival Air Lines fleet
| Aircraft | Total | Introduced | Retired | Notes |
|---|---|---|---|---|
| Airbus A300B4 | 9 | 1994 | 1998 | |
| Boeing 727-100 | 1 | 1989 | 1993 | |
| Boeing 727-200 | 10 | 1989 | 1998 | |
| Boeing 737-200 | 7 | 1990 | 1998 | |
| Boeing 737-300 | 1 | 1991 | 1991 | Leased from ILFC |
| Boeing 737-400 | 11 | 1992 | 1998 | 2 leased from Pegasus Airlines; 1 leased from Luxair |

Carnival Air Lines route structure mainly served the northeast U.S., Florida, Los Angeles and the Caribbean.

== See also ==
- List of defunct airlines of the United States
- Pan American Airways (1996–1998)
