= Pan Am Systems =

Diversified American company

- Formerly: Guilford Transportation Industries
- Company type: Private
- Industry: rail transport manufacturing and energy transportation related brands real estate
- Founded: 1998
- Founder: Timothy Mellon
- Defunct: June 1, 2022
- Fate: Acquired by CSX Corporation
- Headquarters: Portsmouth, New Hampshire, United States
- Subsidiaries: Pan Am Railways; Pan Am Southern; Pan Am Services; Pan Am Brands; Perma Treat Corp.; Aroostook & Bangor Resources; NorthPoint

Pan Am Systems was an American privately held Portsmouth, New Hampshire-based Florida corporation composed of rail transport, manufacturing, energy, transportation, and real estate divisions. It formerly held an airline division.

In 2020, CSX Corporation agreed to buy Pan Am Systems, a deal that went through in 2022 after it received regulatory approval by the Surface Transportation Board. On June 1, 2022, CSX began operating Pan Am Systems and its Pan Am Railways; also, Pan Am Systems was merged into a temporary subsidiary of CSX which will eventually merge into CSX.

== History ==
=== 1981–2020 ===
Guilford Transportation Industries (GTI) was formed in 1981. GTI entered the railroad business in 1981 with its purchase of the Maine Central Railroad Company from U.S. Filter Corporation. This was followed by its 1983 purchase of the Boston & Maine Railroad, and in 1984 it purchased the Delaware and Hudson Railway (D&H). In 1988, GTI declared D&H bankrupt. Francis DiCello, an appointed bankruptcy trustee, oversaw the estate while the New York, Susquehanna & Western Railway managed it employing the D&H workforce. Susquehanna's management expired in early 1990 and the trustee managed it directly until selling in 1991 to the Canadian Pacific Railway.

GTI purchased the name, colors, and logo of Pan American World Airways in 1998 and Pan Am Systems was established that same year. In March 2006, GTI changed its name to Pan Am Railways.

The company was privately owned by Timothy Mellon, an heir to the Mellon banking fortune, and several other stakeholders including former Penn Central employee David Fink and son David A. Fink.

=== CSX acquisition ===
In July 2020, Pan Am Systems was put up for sale. On November 30, 2020, an agreement was announced for CSX Corporation (parent company for CSX Transportation) to acquire Pan Am Systems. Norfolk Southern expressed concern about possible impacts on competition. The sale was proposed as follows: CSX will own and operate between Mattawamkeag, ME and Ayer, MA. Between Ayer and Rotterdam, NY, Genesee and Wyoming Rail will be the operating party. This means the track will be owned by CSX, but CSX will not dispatch it. Also, Norfolk Southern will keep its 49% stake in Pan Am Southern (PAS). With the sale, the intermodal traffic between Mechanicville and Ayer will be re-routed over the B&A to Worcester, MA. From there the traffic will come up the Worcester main and into Ayer Yard.

On March 25, 2021, after numerous letters questioning CSX's acquisition of Pan Am Railways parent Pan Am Systems from the Massachusetts Bay Transportation Authority, the Massachusetts Department of Transportation, the Commonwealth of Massachusetts, Vermont Rail System, as well as many other local political figures and community leaders from other New England states, the Surface Transportation Board ruled the acquisition as "Significant" meaning that a more rigorous review process would be necessary.

On April 30, 2021, CSX submitted a 478-page plan of purchase outlining a broad range of topics, from implementations of track upgrades to the controversial issue of Norfolk Southern intermodal routing, as well as the fate of Pan Am's hodgepodge fleet of aging motive power, which is made up of EMD and GE locomotives from railroads such as Conrail, NS, CSX, the Milwaukee Road, and Kansas City Southern.

On May 26, 2021, the federal regulators of the Surface Transportation Board rejected CSX's purchase application, deeming it "incomplete." The board cited "contradictions" and "lack of necessary information" to properly judge the acquisition, and therefore could not rule on the matter. While CSX has the option of re-submitting a revised application, which it has motioned toward in its official statement, the transaction stands on uncertain ground.

On July 30, 2021, the Surface Transportation Board accepted a revised merger application for consideration, allowing CSX to move forward with the acquisition on Pan Am Systems. The decision determined that an environmental and historic review are unnecessary and establishes criteria for additional filings, public comments, and a deadline for a final Surface Transportation Board decision.

The STB approved the sale of Pan Am Systems to CSX on April 14, 2022, for $600 million. At midnight on June 1, 2022, CSX began operating Pan Am Railways and Pan Am Systems was merged into a temporary subsidiary of CSX called 747 Merger Sub 2 which will become the new Pan Am Systems, the new Pan Am Systems and Pan Am Railways will eventually merge into CSX.

== Divisions ==
=== Air ===
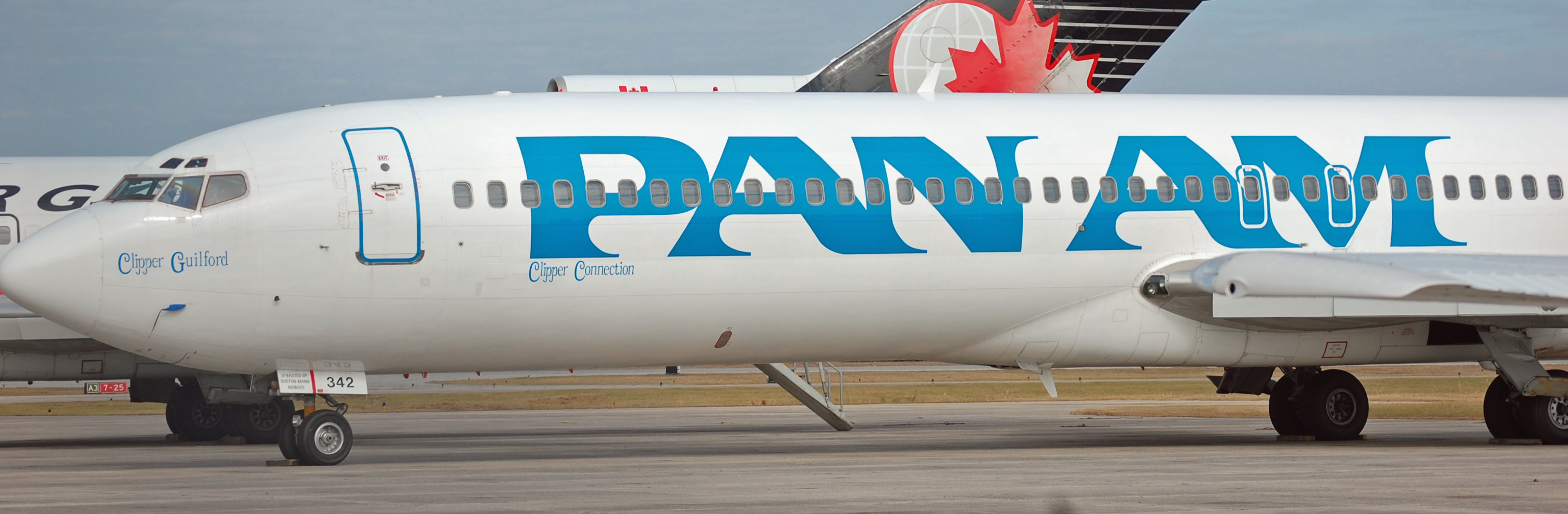
Clipper Guilford, a Boeing 727 operated by Boston-Maine Airways

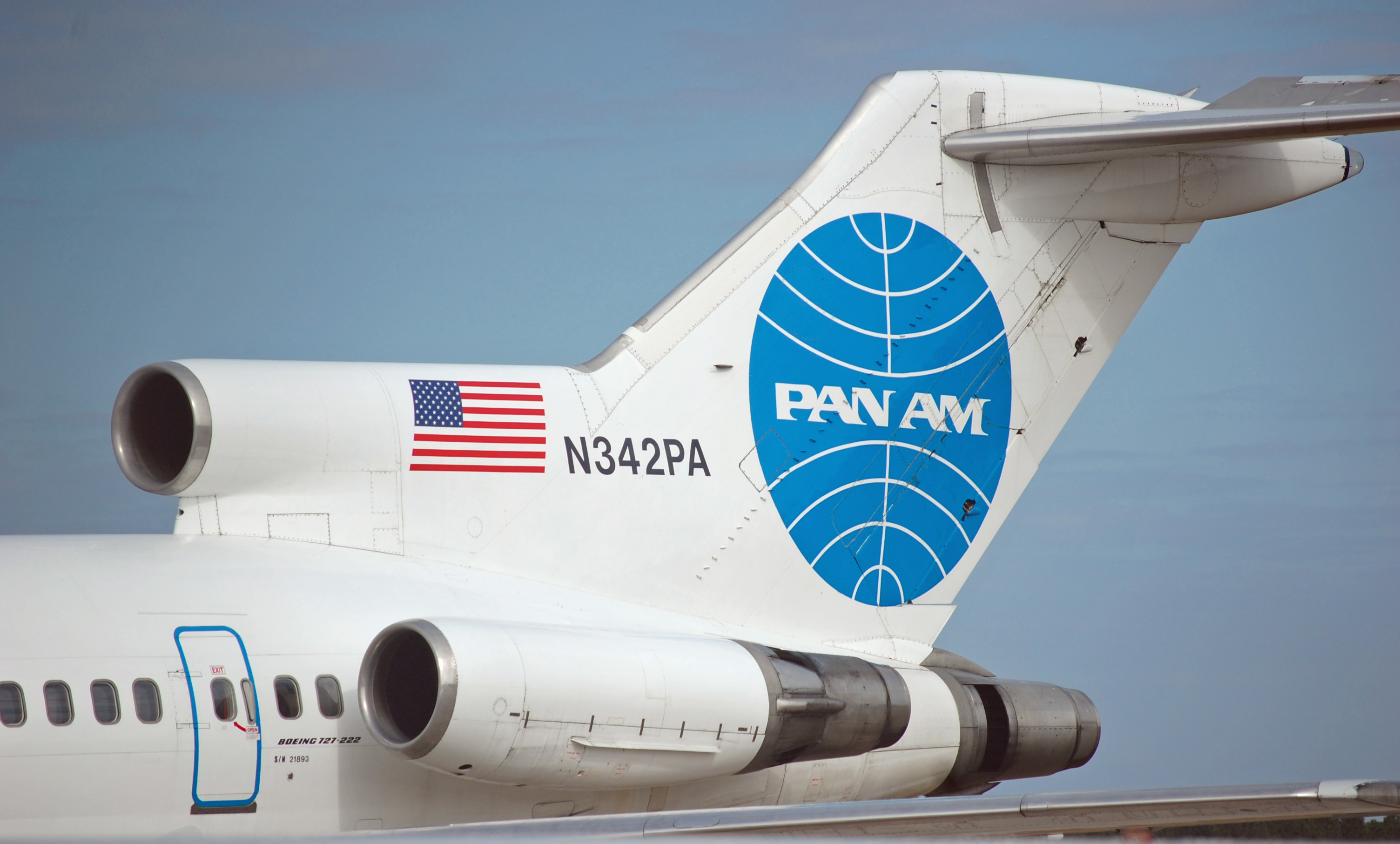
Tail section of Clipper Guilford

- Pan American Airways (1998–2004), a United States airline that operated scheduled services in the eastern USA under the purchased "Pan American Airways" brand, as well as charters for tour operators and services to the Dominican Republic and Puerto Rico. Operations ceased on November 1, 2004, and were transferred to the subsidiary Boston-Maine Airways, which resumed service as the Pan Am Clipper Connection brand.
- Boston-Maine Airways (Pan Am Clipper Connection), the formerly certified airline, which operated charter and scheduled passenger airline services between the northeastern United States and Florida and the Caribbean under the Pan Am Clipper Connection brand. In February 2008 the U.S. Department of Transportation proposed the revocation of Boston-Maine's air carrier certification, as it "is not financially fit and does not possess the managerial competence to conduct any air transportation operations and has failed to comply with the regulations governing its operations." Services ended on February 29, 2008.
- Pan Am Services, originally an aircraft service and support center, now a dealer of aircraft spare parts.
  - Facilities in Dover, New Hampshire and Portsmouth, New Hampshire.

=== Manufacturing and energy ===
- Perma Treat Corporation, manufacturer of railroad ties and other pressure-treated wood products.
  - Facilities in Mattawamkeag, Maine and Durham, Connecticut.
- Aroostook & Bangor Resources, Inc., recycles used railroad ties to generate electricity.
  - Facilities in Mattawamkeag, Maine.

=== Rail ===
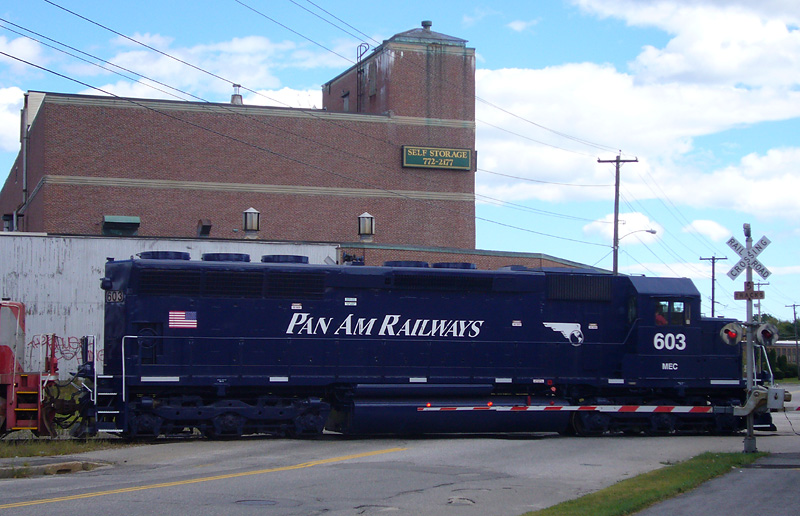
A Pan Am locomotive.

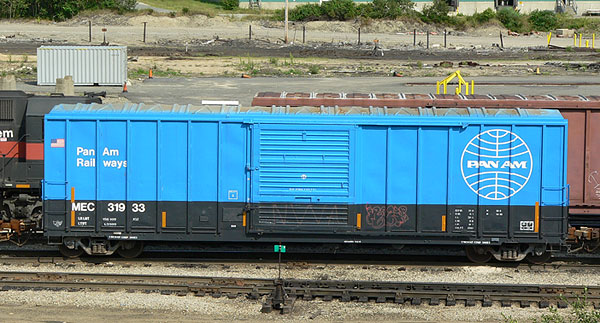
A Pan Am boxcar.

- Pan Am Railways (formerly Guilford Transportation Industries), a regional freight railroad network that covers most of northern New England. Subsidiaries that make up the Pan Am Railways network:
  - Boston and Maine Corporation
  - Maine Central Railroad Company
  - Portland Terminal Company
  - Springfield Terminal Railway Company
  - Pan Am Systems also owned 50% of Pan Am Southern, a joint venture of Pan Am Railways and Norfolk Southern Railway.
- Guilford Motor Express, providing intermodal loading/unloading/warehousing services.

=== Real estate ===
- NorthPoint, a mixed-use development in Cambridge, Massachusetts.

=== Transportation-related brands ===
- Pan Am Brands, distributor of consumer goods bearing the Pan Am logo.
  - Pan Am Brands licenses the name and logos to other companies for certain purposes. An example is Sony Pictures Television, which licensed the brand for the short-lived Pan Am TV series.

== See also ==
- Carnival Airlines
- Pan Am
