= Timothy Mellon =

American businessman (born 1942)

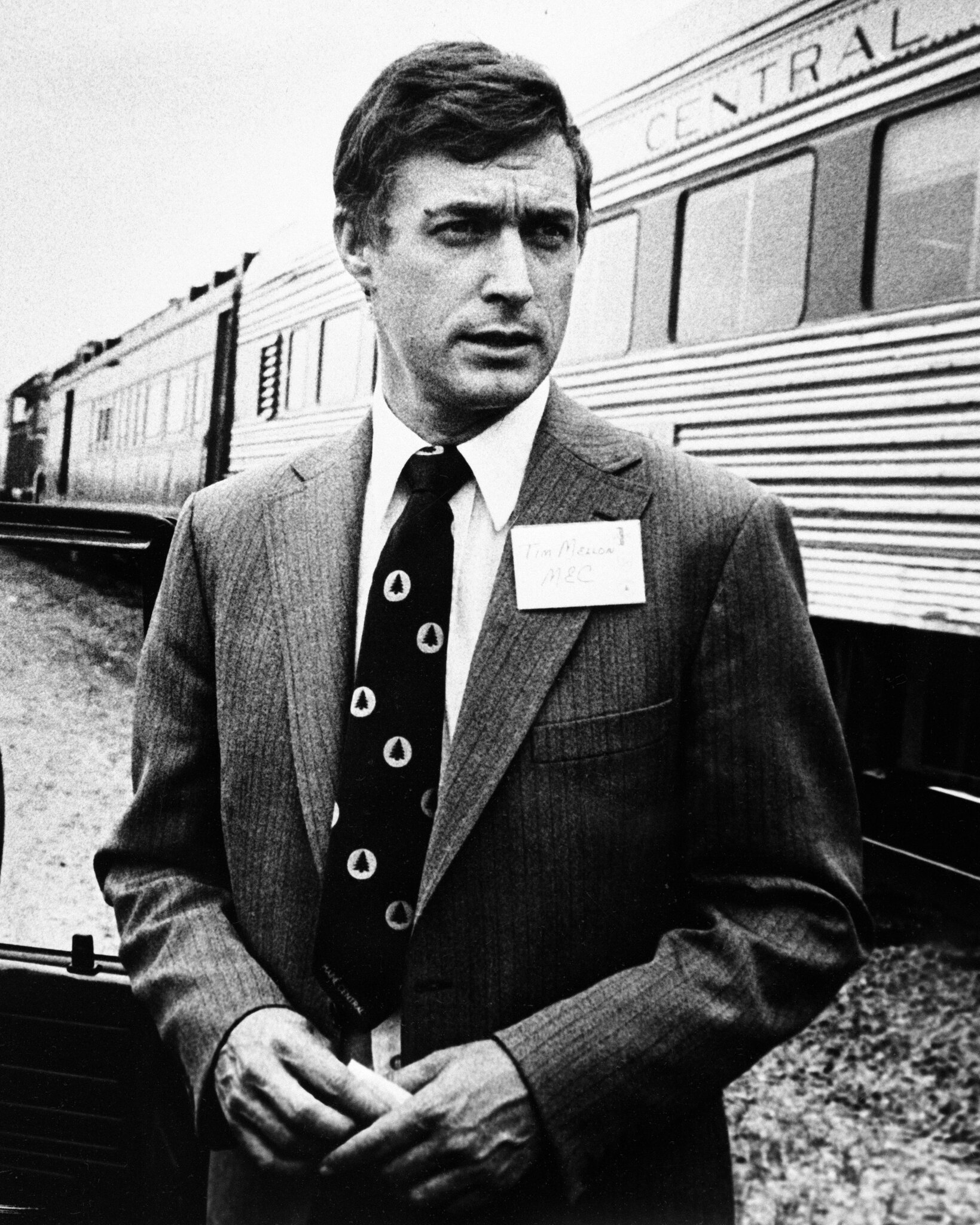
- Mellon in 1981
- Born: July 22, 1942 (age 84); Pittsburgh, Pennsylvania, U.S.
- Education: Yale University (BA, MS)
- Occupation: Businessperson
- Spouses: Susan Crawford Tracy (m. 1963, divorced) Louise Whitney (m. 1980, divorced) Patricia Trenary Freeman (m. 1990, divorced)
- Father: Paul Mellon
- Relatives: Andrew Mellon (grandfather); Rachel Lambert Mellon (stepmother)

Timothy Mellon (born July 22, 1942) is an American businessman, the grandson of Andrew Mellon, and an heir to the Mellon banking fortune. He is a major donor to the Republican Party.

Mellon's net worth has been estimated at between $700 million and $4 billion. As of June 2024, Forbes estimated the Mellon family's net worth at $14.1 billion.

== Early life and education ==
Born on July 22, 1942, in Pittsburgh, Mellon is the son of Paul Mellon and his first wife, Mary Conover Brown, and the grandson of U.S. Treasury Secretary Andrew Mellon. His mother died in 1946.

According to Mellon's memoir, he grew up in a Virginia mansion and a private plane shuttled him to boarding school in Massachusetts. He attended The Fenn School in Concord, Massachusetts, and Milton Academy in Milton, Massachusetts. As a kid, he was considered "gregarious" and "brilliantly mathematically minded", according to Burton Hersh, author of The Mellon Family.

Mellon graduated from Yale University in 1964 with a bachelor's degree in political science with membership in Pi Sigma Alpha. As an undergraduate, he was a member of Trumbull College and the Scroll and Key secret society. He enrolled in Yale Law School but dropped out after three days, instead earning a master's degree in city planning from Yale in 1966.

A May 1971 New York Times article called him "a quiet Yale graduate with two college degrees who has applied computer techniques to city planning." Mellon later rebuked his Yale education as "pseudo-scientific sociological claptrap" and "Progressive dogma".

== Career and life events ==
After graduation, Mellon worked at the Yale computer center for three years. In the 1960s, he founded a software company called Vertical Systems, which sold software for IBM computers.

In 1977, Mellon founded Perma Treat, a treated wood business that produced railroad ties for Amtrak and Conrail. In 1981, he formed Guilford Transportation Industries (GTI), a railroad holding company named for his adopted hometown of Guilford, Connecticut. That year, GTI purchased the Boston & Maine railroad in April and the Maine Central Railroad in May, with government approval for the Boston & Maine completed in 1983. GTI also purchased the Delaware & Hudson (D&H) with government approval in 1984; the D&H was sold in 1988.

In 1998, GTI purchased the bankrupt Pan American World Airways' brand rights for $28.5 million. The company was reorganized as Pan Am Systems and operated the subsidiary Boston-Maine Airways until it was shuttered in 2008 by the Department of Transportation for falsifying financial records and lack of financial fitness. GTI, renamed Pan Am Railways in 2006, was announced for sale by Mellon in 2020 and sold to the CSX Corporation in 2022 for $600 million.

In 1999, Mellon purchased the Goodspeed Airport in East Haddam, Connecticut, for $2.33 million; he sold it in 2020.

In 2002, Mellon stepped down as a trustee of the Andrew W. Mellon Foundation after 21 years on its board.

In July 2024, The New York Times reported that Mellon was responsible for the 2012 removal and subsequent 2013 return of the Narragansett Runestone.

=== Search for Amelia Earhart ===
In 2012, Mellon donated over $1 million to The International Group for Historic Aircraft Recovery (TIGHAR), a nonprofit organization, to assist its efforts to find Amelia Earhart's plane and remains. In 2013, he sued TIGHAR for racketeering, alleging that it engaged in deceit by soliciting his money to search for Earhart's plane. Mellon claimed that the plane had been found in 2010, before he made his donation.

In 2014, U.S. District Judge Scott W. Skavdahl granted TIGHAR's motion for summary judgment after recognizing that even Mellon's own experts were unable to confirm his allegations about the 2010 photographs that he claimed showed the plane. Skavdahl concluded:

Defendants represented to Plaintiff they were planning another expedition in their continued quest to find the wreckage of Amelia Earhart's airplane. Upon reading about Defendants' efforts, Plaintiff contacted Defendants and expressed his interest in supporting the expedition with a monetary contribution. That's exactly what the parties then did. No false representations were made. Regardless, no rational trier of fact could find Defendants falsely represented they had not found Earhart's plane by embarking on another expedition in hopes of finding conclusive evidence to prove it. No matter how convinced or sincere Plaintiff is in his subjective belief and opinion that Amelia Earhart's airplane was or should have been discovered prior to the making of his donation, that belief and opinion is insufficient to create a genuine dispute of material fact.

Mellon appealed to the United States Court of Appeals for the Tenth Circuit, which affirmed the district court's ruling without holding oral argument. The Tenth Circuit concluded that the lack of actionable falsity precluded Mellon's claims.

== Politics ==
=== Views and autobiography ===
Mellon is a Republican, though in the past he supported and donated to liberal causes. He voted for President Lyndon B. Johnson, George McGovern, and Jimmy Carter before becoming a Republican during Ronald Reagan's presidency.

He is a supporter of President Donald Trump. He is anti-tax and anti-union. He has criticized teacher unions and the introduction of women studies, LGBT studies, and African American studies into higher education. He was a listener of Rush Limbaugh.

Mellon faced media attention after comments describing his political views in his 2015 self-published autobiography "panam.captain" came to light. In it, he calls social safety net programs "slavery Redux" and those receiving benefits "slaves of a new master, Uncle Sam". He also writes that black people became "even more belligerent" after social programs expanded in the 1960s and '70s. Mellon defended his comments in the book and did not apologize.

=== Political donations ===
From 1996 to 2017, Mellon gave $350,000 in political donations to George W. Bush, John McCain, and Mitt Romney. From January 2020 to June 2024, he gave $227 million to federal candidates and political committees, nearly all Republicans. As of August 2024, he had donated $165 million in the 2024 elections.

As of 2024 reporting, he had donated to only two Democrats: Alexandria Ocasio-Cortez, for her 2018 campaign, and Tulsi Gabbard, for her 2020 presidential campaign. He said he donated to Ocasio-Cortez to disrupt the Democratic Party.

==== 2010–2021 ====
In 2010, Mellon donated $1.5 million to Arizona Governor Jan Brewer's defense fund to help cover the costs of legal challenges against Arizona SB 1070, the broadest and strictest anti-illegal immigration measure in the U.S. at the time of its passage. The fund's biggest donation, it received national and international attention and spurred considerable controversy.

In the 2018 United States elections, Mellon was a major political donor, especially to the Republican-aligned Congressional Leadership Fund. In April 2020, he donated $10 million to Donald Trump's super PAC America First Action. According to OpenSecrets, in 2020 and 2022, he was the 6th- and 5th-most prolific donor in the U.S., spending $60 million and $47 million, respectively, to support Republican candidates and causes.

In August 2021, Mellon donated $53.1 million in stock to the state of Texas for construction of the Mexico–United States barrier walls.

==== 2024 presidential campaign ====
In the second quarter of 2023, Mellon donated $5 million to American Values 2024, a super PAC affiliated with the Robert F. Kennedy Jr. 2024 presidential campaign; that, together with a large donation from billionaire Gavin de Becker, accounted for 97% of donations the PAC received through the end of June 2023. By March 2024, Mellon's donations to the PAC totaled $20 million, and by July 2024 it had increased to $25 million.

Between April 2023 and March 2024, Mellon donated $15 million to MAGA Inc. (Make America Great Again), a Trump-affiliated super PAC. On May 31, 2024, he gave MAGA Inc. $50 million, one of the largest disclosed donations ever. By July 2024, Mellon had given $75 million toward supporting Trump's campaign, and by October, the amount donated to the PAC had reached $150 million.

Mellon was the second-largest individual donor in the 2024 presidential election, spending $197 million.

==== Post-2024 ====
In the first half of 2025, Mellon donated an additional $2 million to MAGA Inc.

During the 2025 United States federal government shutdown, Mellon donated $130 million to help pay members of the United States Armed Forces. The New York Times noted that the donation would equal approximately $100 per service member.

== Personal life ==
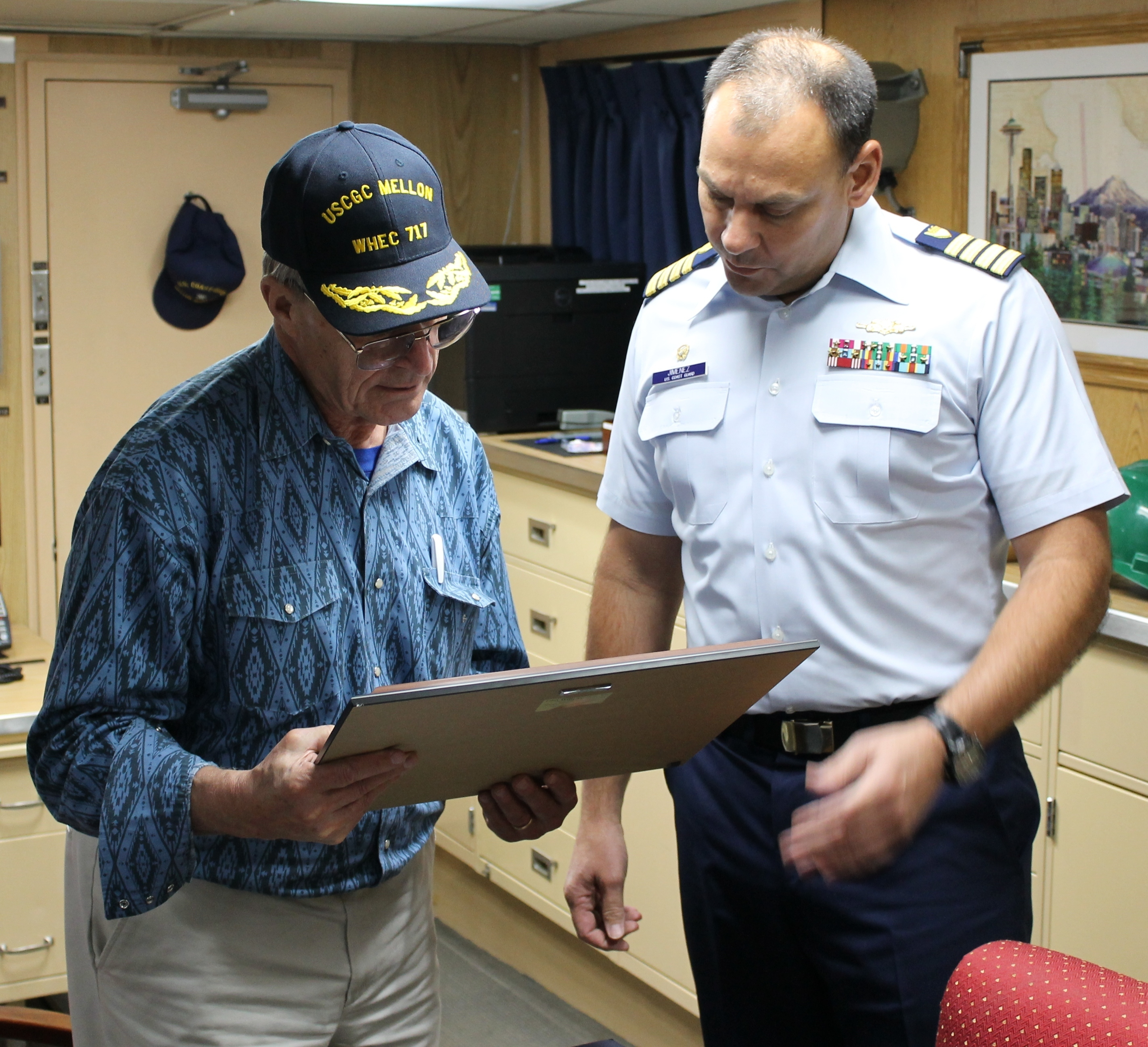
Mellon (left) receives a framed photograph of the USCGC Mellon, a ship named after his grandfather, Andrew.

The New York Times has called Mellon a "reclusive billionaire". His nephew has called him the "most private Mellon there is" and "a highly private individual" to those who know him.

His inheritance from the Mellon family was estimated at $100 million by Forbes. His net worth is estimated to be between $700 million and $4 billion. He owns properties in Wyoming and Connecticut.

A private pilot, he has logged over 11,500 flight hours.

=== Marriages ===
On June 8, 1963 in Morristown, New Jersey, Mellon married Susan Crawford Tracy, the daughter of a Esso Standard Oil executive. The couple moved to Guilford, Connecticut. They divorced by the early 1980s.

In the early 1980s, Mellon married Louise Whitney, a childhood friend. They divorced in the early 1990s. He then married Patricia Trenary Freeman, the divorcee of a former classmate who was the best man at his first wedding. They then divorced and remarried. They moved from Guilford to Saratoga, Wyoming, in 2005.

=== Legal issues ===
Mellon has been involved in a number of legal issues, often over relatively small dollar amounts. Testifying in a 2014 civil case, he estimated he had been deposed 15 to 20 times, and that he did not know how many lawsuits he was then involved in.

In 2004, he was sued by Connecticut Attorney General Richard Blumenthal for cutting down trees in a conserved wetland and was fined.
