= Pan Am (1998–2004) =

United States airline

Pan American Airways
IATA	ICAO	Call sign
PN	PAA	CLIPPER
- Founded: June 29, 1998; 28 years ago
- Commenced operations: October 7, 1999; 26 years ago
- Ceased operations: November 1, 2004; 21 years ago
- Hubs: Portsmouth International Airport at Pease
- Fleet size: 7
- Destinations: 8
- Parent company: Guilford Transportation Industries
- Headquarters: Portsmouth, New Hampshire, U.S.
- Key people: Timothy Mellon

Pan American Airways, also known as Pan Am III, was an American airline that operated scheduled services in the eastern United States, as well as charters for tour operators and services to the Dominican Republic and Puerto Rico. The carrier was established in 1998 from the ashes of Pan Am II, itself the successor to the original Pan Am airline, which had gone bankrupt in 1991.

== History ==
The Pan Am brand was sold by the second incarnation of Pan American World Airways to New Hampshire-based Guilford Transportation Industries, a railroad company headed by Timothy Mellon.

After this transaction, a new airline was established on June 29, 1998. Guilford launched Pan American Airways with a fleet of seven Boeing 727-200s. This airline was nicknamed by some as Pan Am III. The new owners relocated the company headquarters from Fort Lauderdale to Portsmouth in December 1998. The third incarnation began scheduled operations on October 7, 1999, and flew to nine cities in New England, Florida, the Canadian Maritimes, and Puerto Rico. The focus was on secondary airports such as Orlando Sanford International Airport, Pease International Airport, and Worcester Regional Airport.

Pan American later had cooperative service arrangements with Boston-Maine Airways, a feeder subsidiary incorporated by the airline in March 1999. Pan American also established in 2003 a subsidiary PAWA Dominicana, operating under a joint venture with Boston-Maine Airways.

Guilford ceased operating Pan Am on November 1, 2004, and its operations were transferred to Boston-Maine Airways which in turn operated Pan Am Clipper Connection service with Boeing 727-200 jetliners as well as with British Aerospace BAe Jetstream 31 and CASA C-212 Aviocar commuter turboprops.

== Destinations in 2001 ==
According to its system timetable, the airline was serving the following destinations in the spring of 2001 with Boeing 727-200 jetliners:

- Allentown, Pennsylvania - served via the Lehigh Valley International Airport (ABE)
- Bangor, Maine - served via the Bangor International Airport (BGR)
- Belleville, Illinois - served via the MidAmerica St. Louis Airport (BLV)
- Gary, Indiana - served via the Gary/Chicago International Airport (GYY)
- Orlando, Florida - Hub served via the Orlando Sanford International Airport (SFB)
- Portsmouth, New Hampshire - served via the Portsmouth International Airport (PSM, formerly Pease Air Force Base)
- San Juan, Puerto Rico - served via the Luis Munoz Marin International Airport (SJU)
- Worcester, Massachusetts - served via the Worcester Regional Airport (ORH)

== Fleet ==
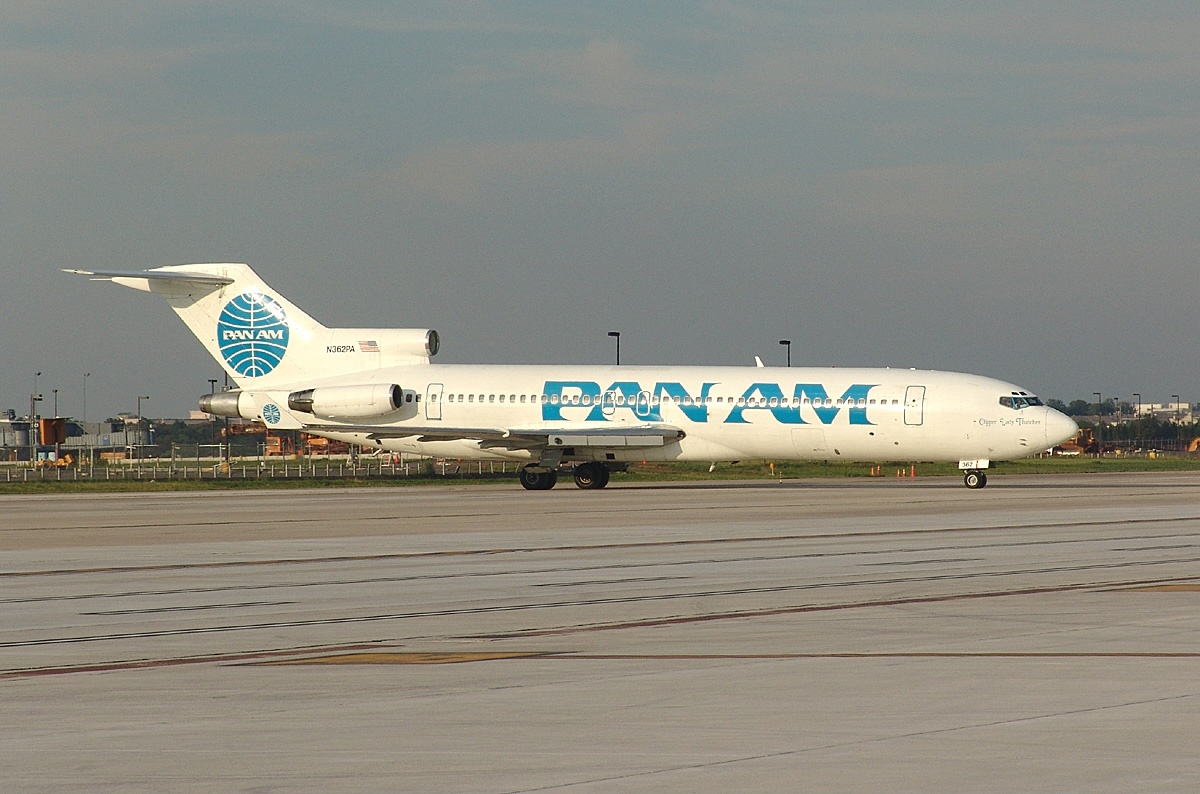
A Pan American Boeing 727-200 at Dulles International Airport in 2004

Pan Am operated a fleet of seven Boeing 727-200s. The registration "N" numbers and names of these aircraft were as follows:

- N342PA (Clipper Guilford)
- N343PA ("Bahamas Clipper")
- N346PA ("Clipper Lady Thatcher")
- N348PA ("Clipper Ed Ball")
- N349PA ("Clipper Juan Trippe")
- N361PA ("Clipper A. Jay Cristol")
- N362PA ("Clipper Lady Thatcher" / "Clipper Omagh")

== See also ==
- Pan American Airways (1996–1998)
- List of defunct airlines of the United States
