= Paradise Island Airlines =

Regional airline of the United States (1989–1999)

| IATA | ICAO | Call sign |
|---|---|---|
| BK | PDI | PARADISE ISLAND |
- Commenced operations: March 1989
- Ceased operations: May 1999
- Fleet size: de Havilland Canada DHC-7 Dash 7
- Destinations: See Destinations below
- Parent company: Resorts International

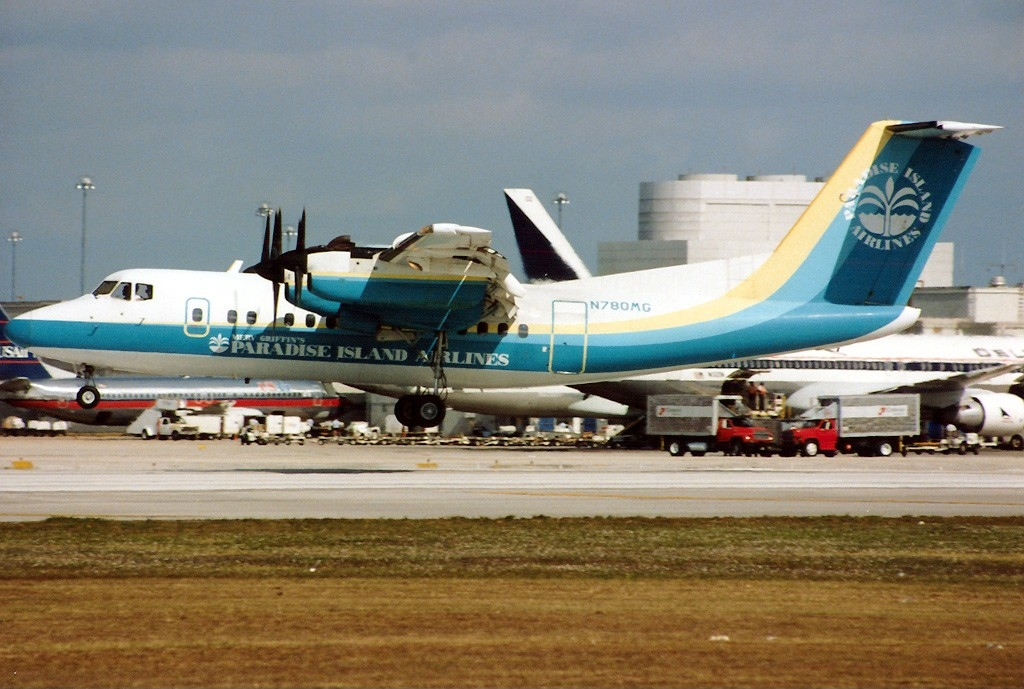
Paradise Island Airlines de Havilland Canada DHC-7 Dash 7

Paradise Island Airlines was an American airline that connected Florida with Paradise Island in the Bahamas in the 1990s. According to the Official Airline Guide (OAG), the airline's two letter code was "BK".

Merv Griffin Enterprises' Resorts International owned hotels and other resort amenities on Paradise Island, as well as Chalk's Ocean Airways, which carried tourists to the island. However, Chalk's seaplanes were restricted to daylight operations due to the difficulty of landing on water at night. Accordingly, Resorts International launched Paradise Island Airways in March 1989, to handle increased vacation traffic from Florida to the Bahamas. The airline primarily operated the STOL (short takeoff and landing) de Havilland Canada DHC-7 Dash 7 turboprop which was well suited for the service given the relatively short 3,000 foot runway at the Paradise Island Airport. However, around this time, Resorts International was in severe financial distress and filed for Chapter 11 bankruptcy protection in December 1989.

After financial difficulties and a series of ownership changes for the two airlines, Paradise Island Airlines ceased operations in May 1999.

== Destinations ==
- Fort Lauderdale, Florida (FLL)
- Miami, Florida (MIA)
- Paradise Island, Bahamas (PID) - primary destination
- West Palm Beach, Florida (PBI)
- Orlando, Florida (MCO)

== Code sharing destinations ==
According to the December 19, 1996 route map for Carnival Air Lines, Paradise Island Airlines was operating code sharing flights with its Dash 7 aircraft to the following destinations on behalf of Carnival:

- Fort Lauderdale (FLL)
- Fort Myers (RSW)
- Key West (EYW)
- Paradise Island (PID)
- West Palm Beach (PBI)

== Fleet ==
- Three (3) de Havilland Canada DHC-7 Dash 7 STOL-capable turboprop aircraft

The airline also operated de Havilland Canada DHC-6 Twin Otter STOL-capable turboprop aircraft.

== See also ==
- List of defunct airlines of the United States
