= Boston-Maine Airways =

US airline (2000–2008)

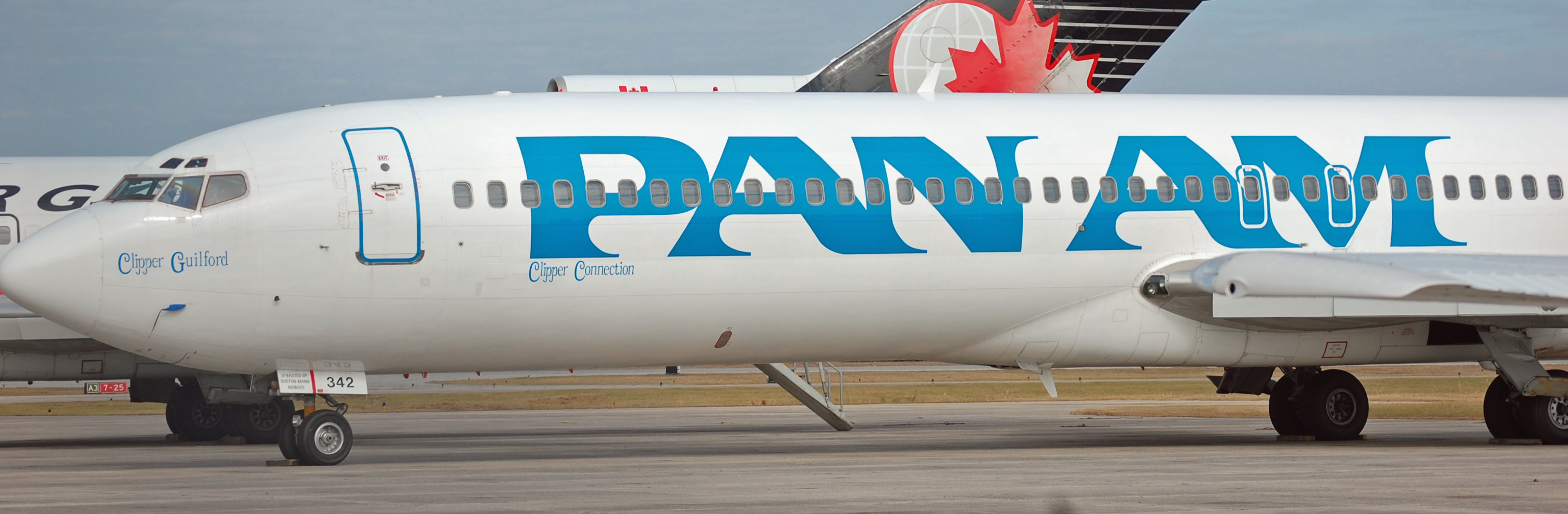
- Clipper Guilford, a Boeing 727-200 operating for Pan American Clipper Connection
IATA	ICAO	Call sign
E9	CXS	CLIPPER CONNECTION
- Founded: March 22, 1999; 27 years ago
- Commenced operations: May 1, 2000; 26 years ago
- Ceased operations: February 29, 2008; 18 years ago
- Hubs: Portsmouth International Airport at Pease
- Secondary hubs: Hanscom Field
- Frequent-flyer program: The Clipper Club
- Fleet size: 9
- Destinations: 24
- Parent company: Pan Am Systems
- Headquarters: Portsmouth, New Hampshire, U.S.
- Key people: David Fink (President)
- Website: flypanam.com bmairways.com

Boston-Maine Airways was an American airline headquartered in Portsmouth, New Hampshire, United States. It operated scheduled commuter turboprop services as well as Boeing 727-200 jet flights under the Pan Am Clipper Connection name. Its main base was Pease International Airport. Boston-Maine Airways ceased all Pan Am flights on February 29, 2008.

== History ==
Boston-Maine Airways was established on March 22, 1999, and started operations in May 2000. It was founded as a feeder for the third incarnation of Pan American Airways and also flew leased BAe Jetstream 31 aircraft for Caesar's of Atlantic City, New Jersey. It was wholly owned by Pan Am Systems (formerly known as Guilford Transportation Industries), which owned the Pan Am brand.

Boston-Maine Airways operated six round-trips daily between Trenton–Mercer Airport in Ewing, New Jersey, and Hanscom Field in Bedford, Massachusetts. Boston-Maine Airways also operated one round-trip daily between Trenton–Mercer Airport and Pease International Airport in Portsmouth, New Hampshire.

Guilford ceased the operations of Pan Am on November 1, 2004. Boston-Maine Airways then took over its operations, which resumed the Boeing 727 jet service under the Pan Am Clipper Connection brand on February 17, 2005.

In August 2005, a federal investigation into fraudulent financial data submitted by Boston-Maine Airways halted plans to expand its fleet and route system. At the same time, the airline pilots' union claimed that the airline was unfit to operate and urged the Department of Transportation to deny the airline's certification for expansion. The airline later announced that it was suspending service from September 6 to November 16, citing rising fuel costs and decreased levels of booking. In the middle of October 2005, the airline suspended Boeing 727 flights indefinitely from several airports that it served, including its home base in Portsmouth, New Hampshire.

However, by March 21, 2006, Pan Am Clipper Connection became the first announced non-charter service to connect to the then-growing Tunica Municipal Airport in Tunica, Mississippi. The addition not only connected the carrier to a burgeoning casino destination but also aided efforts to bolster Tunica Municipal as a secondary airport to Memphis International Airport in nearby Memphis, Tennessee. Boston-Maine Airways' Pan Am Clipper Connection flew from Tunica Municipal Airport to Hartsfield-Jackson Atlanta International Airport three times per week; the service to Tunica had ended by October of the same year.

On August 1, 2006, Boston-Maine Airways announced that it would begin the Pan Am Clipper Connection service to Elmira-Corning Regional Airport in Elmira, New York. Company executives believed that Elmira was a perfect fit for the company, with its close proximity to Rochester, Ithaca, Binghamton, and Williamsport. The airline flew twice-daily routes to Bedford, Massachusetts, Trenton, New Jersey, and Baltimore-Washington International Thurgood Marshall Airport. In addition, a later flight was added to Orlando. However, by the fall of 2007, service to Elmira closed.

Pan Am Clipper Connection began non-stop service to Baltimore-Washington International Thurgood Marshall Airport, Bedford, Massachusetts, and Portsmouth, New Hampshire from New Haven, Connecticut, on March 8, 2007, using 19-seat British Aerospace Jetstream 31 commuter turboprops. Service was later discontinued in July 2007.

=== End of service ===
On February 1, 2008, the U.S. Department of Transportation (DOT) issued a Show Cause Order (Order 2008-2-3, DOT Docket Number DOT-OST-2000-7668), concluding that Boston-Maine's air carrier certificate should be revoked for three reasons: 1) lack of financial fitness, 2) lack of proper management oversight and 3) lack of "compliance disposition," or willingness to follow federal laws, rules and regulations.

The Air Line Pilots Association brought the motion to revoke Boston-Maine's DOT air carrier certificate. The DOT specifically cited the numerous instances where the airline's officials had failed to follow federal laws and regulations and had filed false financial data with the department in its application for authority to fly large aircraft. The DOT concluded that it would have never granted the large aircraft authority had it known of the false information filed by Boston-Maine.

The DOT also rejected the carrier's arguments that it was not responsible for the company's former General Counsel and Vice President's filing of such false information (Boston-Maine had asserted that this individual had acted alone, without the company's knowledge or involvement).

On February 28, 2008, Boston-Maine Airways ended its Jetstream-operated scheduled passenger service. March 29, 2008, was their last 727 flight.

Beginning in July 2008, the company moved eight of its aircraft to Concord Municipal Airport in New Hampshire, with the intent to keep them there until buyers took the planes. Parked on the ramp were six Jetstream 31s to be sold, but one Jetstream and a Cessna Citation I were placed in the corporate hangar operated by Concord Aviation Services.

== Destinations ==
Boston-Maine Airways and the Pan Am Clipper Connection served the following destinations at various times during its existence:

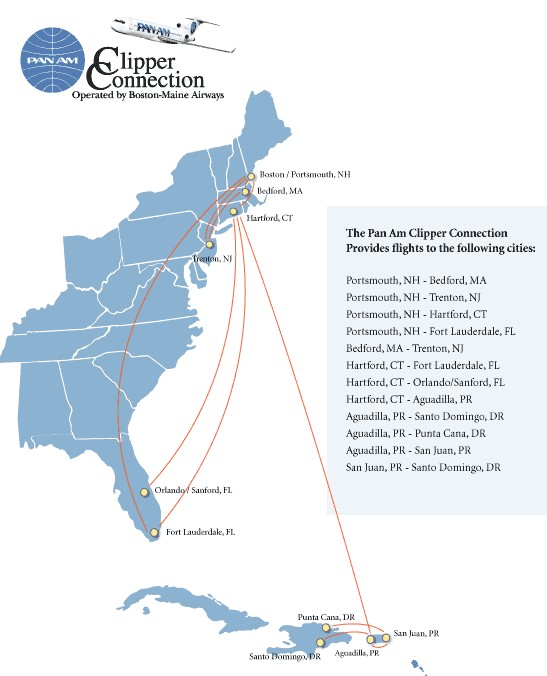
Pam Am Destinations as 2005 from the flypanam.com website

United States

- Connecticut
  - Hartford (Bradley International Airport)
  - New Haven (Tweed New Haven Airport)
- Florida
  - Fort Lauderdale (Fort Lauderdale International Airport)
  - Orlando (Orlando Sanford International Airport)
  - St. Petersburg/Clearwater (St. Pete-Clearwater International Airport)
- Georgia
  - Atlanta (Hartsfield-Jackson Atlanta International Airport)
- Illinois
  - MidAmerica St. Louis Airport
- Indiana
  - Gary/Chicago International Airport
- Maine
  - Bangor International Airport
- Maryland
  - Baltimore (Baltimore-Washington International Airport)
  - Cumberland (Greater Cumberland Regional Airport)
  - Hagerstown (Hagerstown Regional Airport)
- Massachusetts
  - Bedford (Hanscom Field) Hub
  - Worcester (Worcester Regional Airport)
- Mississippi
  - Tunica (Tunica Airport)
- New Hampshire
  - Portsmouth (Pease International Airport) Hub
- New Jersey
  - Trenton (Trenton–Mercer Airport)
- New York
  - Elmira (Elmira-Corning Regional Airport)
  - Ithaca (Ithaca Tompkins International Airport)
  - Newburgh (Stewart International Airport)
- Ohio
  - Columbus (Rickenbacker International Airport)
- Pennsylvania
  - Allentown (Lehigh Valley International Airport)

Dominican Republic

- Punta Cana (Punta Cana International Airport)
- Santo Domingo (Las Americas International Airport)

Puerto Rico

- Aguadilla (Rafael Hernández International Airport)
- San Juan (Luis Muñoz Marín International Airport)

== Fleet ==
The Boston-Maine Airways fleet consisted of the following aircraft:

Aircraft	Total	Introduced	Retired	Notes
Boeing 727-200	6	2004	2008	
British Aerospace Jetstream 31	10	1999	2008	
CASA C-212-200 Aviocar	2	1999	2004	Used to carry engines and spare parts.

== See also ==
- List of defunct airlines of the United States
- Pan American Airways (1998–2004)
