= Phoenix Airways =

Inter-Caribbean airline based in Basseterre, Saint Kitts

IATA	ICAO	Call sign
-	-	-
- Founded: September 2012
- Commenced operations: 16 July 2014
- Operating bases: Robert L. Bradshaw International Airport (St.Kitts)
- Hubs: Robert L. Bradshaw International Airport (St.Kitts)
- Focus cities: Grantley Adams International Airport (Barbados) Las Americas International Airport (Santo Domingo)
- Fleet size: 7
- Destinations: 72
- Headquarters: Basseterre, Saint Kitts and Nevis
- Website: www.flyphoenixair.com

Phoenix Airways is an inter-Caribbean airline based in Basseterre, Saint Kitts. The airline flies from St. Kitts to several destinations, including Aruba, Barbados, Dominican Republic and Tortola.

== Operations ==
The airline began operations in July 2014. By the end of the month, press reports indicated that the airline was experiencing smaller loads than expected. In August the airline acknowledged that this had led to flight cancellations and to the use of smaller planes, meaning that some passengers were unable to board their flights.

In March 2015, the company's CEO was arrested by the Barbados Fraud Squad.

== Destinations ==
Phoenix Airways announced that it would serve the following destinations in August 2014 :

†	Hub
#	Destinations

City	Country	Airport	ICAO
Basseterre	Saint Kitts and Nevis	Robert L. Bradshaw International Airport	TKPK
Bridgetown	Barbados	Grantley Adams International Airport	TBPB
Road Town	Tortola	Terrance B. Lettsome International Airport	TUPJ
Santo Domingo	Dominican Republic	Las Americas International Airport	MDSD
Philipsburg	Saint Maarten	Princess Juliana International Airport	TNCM
Roseau	Dominica	Melville Hall Airport	TDPD
St. John's	Antigua and Barbuda	V.C. Bird International Airport	TAPA
The Valley	Anguilla	Clayton J. Lloyd International Airport	TQPF
San Juan	Puerto Rico	Luis Muñoz Marín International Airport	TJSJ
Christiansted	United States Virgin Islands	Henry E. Rohlsen International Airport	TISX
Charlestown	Saint Kitts and Nevis	Vance W. Amory International Airport	TKPN

== Timeshare Packages ==
The airline offered timeshare packages that also include an ownership share in the airline.

== Fleet ==
The airline said it would operate the following aircraft:

Phoenix Airways fleet
Aircraft	In Service	Orders	Passengers		
Aircraft	In Service	Orders	J	Y	Total
Beechcraft 1900	1	-	-	19	19
Beechcraft King Air 350	1	-	-	9	9
Boeing 737-300	1	-	-	141	141
Embraer EMB 120ER Brasilia	1	-	-	30	30
