= Air Sunshine =

Airline of the United States

IATA	ICAO	Call sign
YI	RSI	AIR SUNSHINE
- Founded: 1982
- Ceased operations: 2024
- AOC #: RSHA311A
- Hubs: Luis Muñoz Marín International Airport in San Juan, Puerto Rico
- Fleet size: 8
- Destinations: 12
- Headquarters: Fort Lauderdale, Florida, United States
- Website: www.airsunshine.com

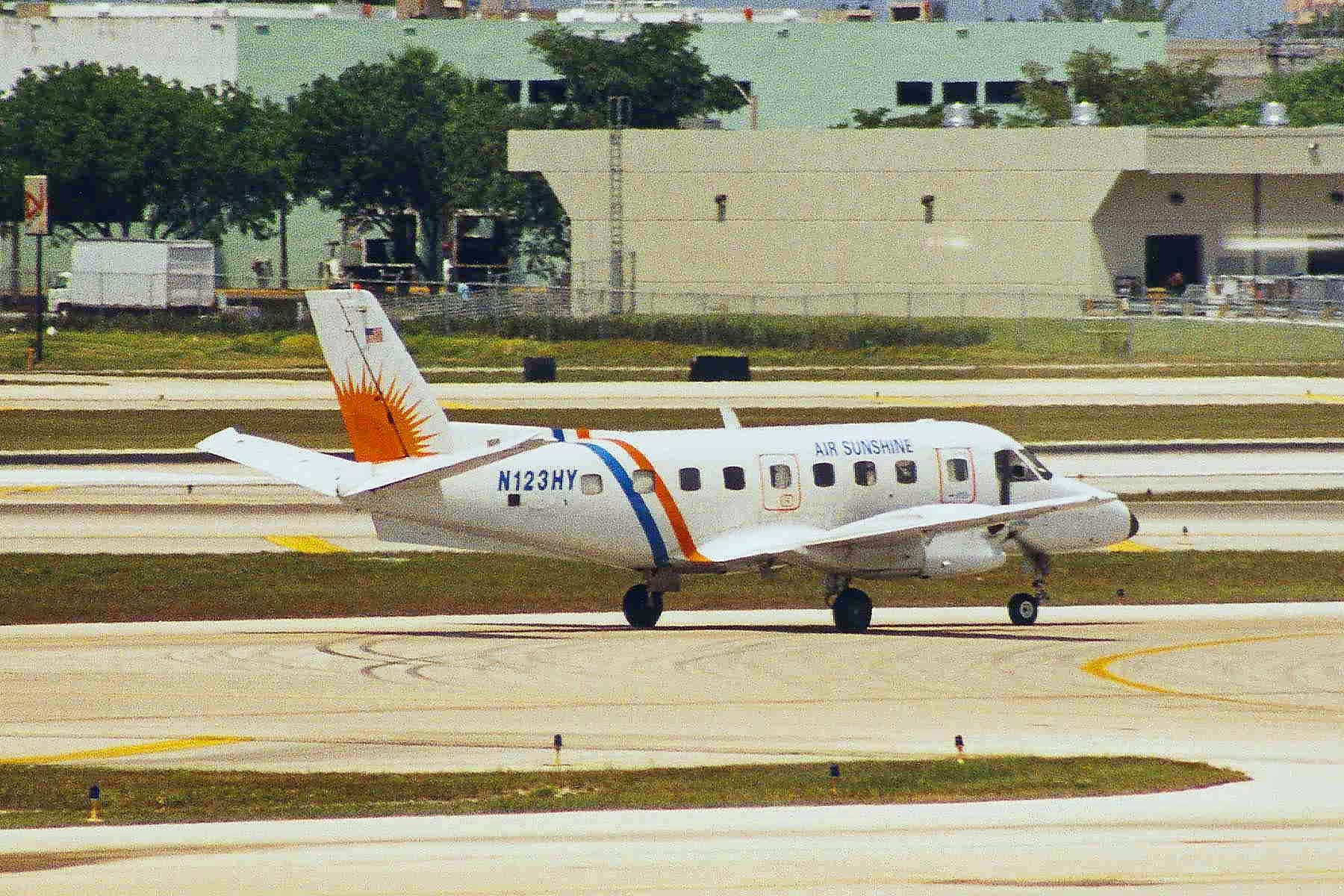
Embraer EMB-110 formerly operated by Air Sunshine

Air Sunshine was an airline based in the United States and in Puerto Rico. It operated scheduled service to and from San Juan and Vieques, Puerto Rico, St. Lucia, Anguilla, Dominica, Sint Maarten, Nevis, St. Kitts, Tortola and Virgin Gorda in the British Virgin Islands and Saint Thomas, US Virgin Islands. Its main base was Fort Lauderdale, with a Caribbean hub located in San Juan, Puerto Rico.

As of 1982, the airline considered Fort Lauderdale to be its corporate headquarters however, the main base of operations was located in San Juan, Puerto Rico. Air Sunshine's website listed two separate post office boxes for contacts, one in Fort Lauderdale and another in San Juan.

Air Sunshine is reportedly out of business as of Sept. 25, 2024. No other information is known.

== Destinations ==
Air Sunshine operates a series of short routes between its destinations.

- Anguilla - Clayton J. Lloyd International Airport
- Dominica - Douglas–Charles Airport
- George Town - Exuma International Airport
- Nevis - Vance W. Armory International Airport
- St. Croix - Henry E. Rohlsen Airport
- St. Thomas - Cyril E. King International Airport
- San Juan - Luis Muñoz Marín International Airport
- Saint Kitts - Robert L. Bradshaw International Airport
- Saint Lucia - George F. L. Charles Airport
- Sint Maarten - Princess Juliana International Airport
- Tortola - Terrance B. Lettsome International Airport
- Vieques - Antonio Rivera Rodríguez Airport
- Virgin Gorda - Virgin Gorda Airport

Former Destinations

- Kingston - Norman Manley International Airport

== Fleet ==
As of July 2019 the Air Sunshine fleet included:

Air Sunshine Fleet
Aircraft	In Fleet	Passengers	Notes
Beechcraft 1900	2	19	
Cessna 402	4	6	
Saab 340A	2	30 to 36	
Total	8		

In August 2006, the fleet consisted of 1 Beechcraft 1900C and 2 Saab 340A aircraft.

Other previously operated aircraft:

- Embraer EMB-110 Bandeirante

== Accidents and incidents ==
Air Sunshine had a better-than-average safety record between 1997 and 2004, per the NTSB. In that same period, there were a few incidents.

On July 13, 2003, Air Sunshine flight 527, operating FAR Part 135 scheduled commuter service from Fort Lauderdale (ICAO: KFLL) to Treasure Cay Airport (ICAO: MYAT), Great Abaco Island in The Bahamas using a Cessna 402C with registration N314AB, crashed in an at-sea ditching about 8 miles short of the airport. Inadequate maintenance was found to be the probable cause for the single engine failure. The resulting crash was blamed on the pilot's "failure to adequately manage the airplane's performance after the engine failed" and he was considered to have contributed to the deaths of two passengers who died after evacuation by not having provided an adequate emergency briefing.

On January 7, 2007, an Air Sunshine Cessna 402 had hydraulic problems with the landing gear during a flight from Virgin Gorda to San Juan (SJU). There were no injuries and the pilot managed to land the plane safely. The airport was closed for approximately 30 minutes until the emergency ceased.

On February 11, 2017, an Air Sunshine Cessna 402 overran the runway at Virgin Gorda following a brake failure. The UK Air Accidents Investigation board has reported 'shortfalls' in procedure and recommended that the FAA review Air Sunshine's operations and maintenance.
