= Virgin Gorda Airport =

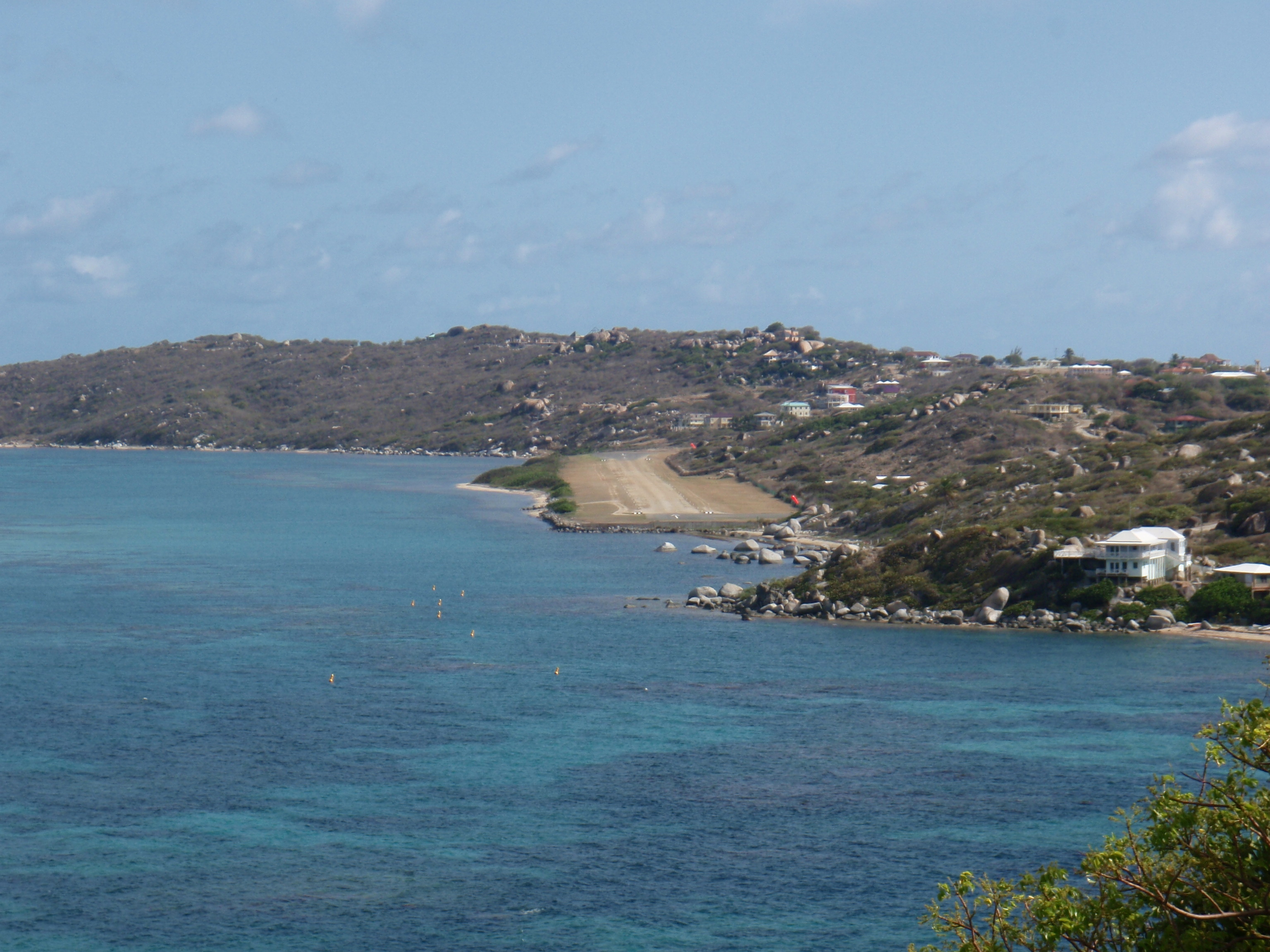
- IATA: VIJ; ICAO: TUPW

Summary
- Airport type: Public
- Operator: BVIAA
- Serves: Spanish Town, Virgin Gorda
- Location: British Virgin Islands
- Elevation AMSL: 14 ft (4.3 m)
- Coordinates: 18°26′44″N 64°25′41″W

Map
- Location in the British Virgin Islands

Runways
Direction	Length		Surface
Direction	m	ft	Surface
03/21	945	3,100	Sand & Gravel (unpaved runway)
- Source: DAFIF

Virgin Gorda Airport (IATA: VIJ, ICAO: TUPW) is an airport on Virgin Gorda in the British Virgin Islands, an overseas territory of the United Kingdom.

== History ==
Historically, Virgin Gorda was served in the past by American Eagle with this code sharing service being operated by Executive Airlines on behalf of American Airlines from San Juan (SJU). This regional air carrier became a wholly owned subsidiary of American Airlines and flew CASA 212-200 twin turboprop aircraft into the airport.

Sunaire flying as Eastern Express on behalf of Eastern Airlines via a code sharing agreement served Virgin Gorda as well, primarily with flights between the airport and San Juan as well as the U.S. Virgin Islands. This wholly owned subsidiary of Metro Airlines operated de Havilland Canada DHC-6 Twin Otter STOL (short take-off and landing) turboprop aircraft. Other airlines which served Virgin Gorda with Twin Otter aircraft were Crown Air/Dorado Wings and Virgin Island Airways with these commuter air carriers operating nonstop flights between the airport and San Juan. Before introducing service with larger Twin Otter aircraft, Dorado Wings operated smaller Britten-Norman BN-2 Islander aircraft into the airport.

Another airline that served Virgin Gorda in the past was Air BVI which was based in neighboring Tortola. Air BVI operated eight-passenger seat Britten-Norman BN-2 Islander twin prop, STOL capable aircraft into the airport with nonstop flights to San Juan as well as to nearby Tortola According to the 16 December 1980 Air BVI timetable, "no reservation shuttle" service was being operated at the time between the Beef Island Airport on Tortola and Virgin Gorda and the one-way flight time between the two airports was a very short five minutes. Another airline which served Virgin Gorda with Britten-Norman Islander aircraft was Vieques Air Link while Air Sunshine flew Cessna 402 twin prop aircraft into the airport with both commuter air carriers operating nonstop flights to San Juan in 1999. Air Sunshine continues to serve Virgin Gorda at the present time.

Island Birds Air Charter, having served Virgin Gorda since the year 2000, currently operates on demand, non-scheduled charter service to the airport.

The airport is owned and operated by the Government of the VI (UK). The government purchased the airport from Little Dix Bay Resort for $2.9 million in 2005.

The runway at the airport remains an unpaved, sand and gravel airstrip. In January 2010 the airport was closed for major construction work. It reopened in December 2010 with limitations and restrictions put in place by the ASSI regulatory agency. It is currently restricted to a small handful of airlines that must be fully approved by both ASSI and the FAA to operate at the field.

== Airlines and destinations ==
=== Passenger ===
Airlines	Destinations
Cape Air	Seasonal: San Juan
Charter Flights Caribbean	San Juan
Tradewind Aviation	Seasonal: San Juan
Trans Anguilla Airways	Anguilla, Tortola
