= List of airlines of the British Virgin Islands =

This is a list of airlines in the British Virgin Islands.

== Operating ==
| Airline | Image | IATA | ICAO | Callsign | Commenced operations | Notes |
|---|---|---|---|---|---|---|
| Citco BVI | | | | | 2010 | |
| Clair Aero | | | | | 2015 | |
| Fly BVI | | | | | 1992 | |
| Island Birds | | | | | 2000 | |
| North Eastern Caribbean Airline | | | | | 2021 | |
| Talos Aviation | | | | | 2015 | |
| VI Airlink | | V6 | VIL | TURTLE DOVE | 2014 | |

== Defunct ==
| Airline | Image | IATA | ICAO | Callsign | Founded | Ceased operations | Notes |
|---|---|---|---|---|---|---|---|
| Air BVI | | BL | | | 1971 | 1996 | |
| British Caribbean Airways | | | | | 1986 | 1986 | |
| BVI Airways | | | BVI | DRAKE | 2009 | 2017 | |
| Gorda Aero Services | | DV | | | 2002 | 2002 | |
| Trans Lloyd Air Cargo | | | | | 1996 | 1998 | Moved its AOC to Burundi and rebranded as Starwelt Airlines |

== See also ==
- List of airlines
