= Cyril E. King Airport =

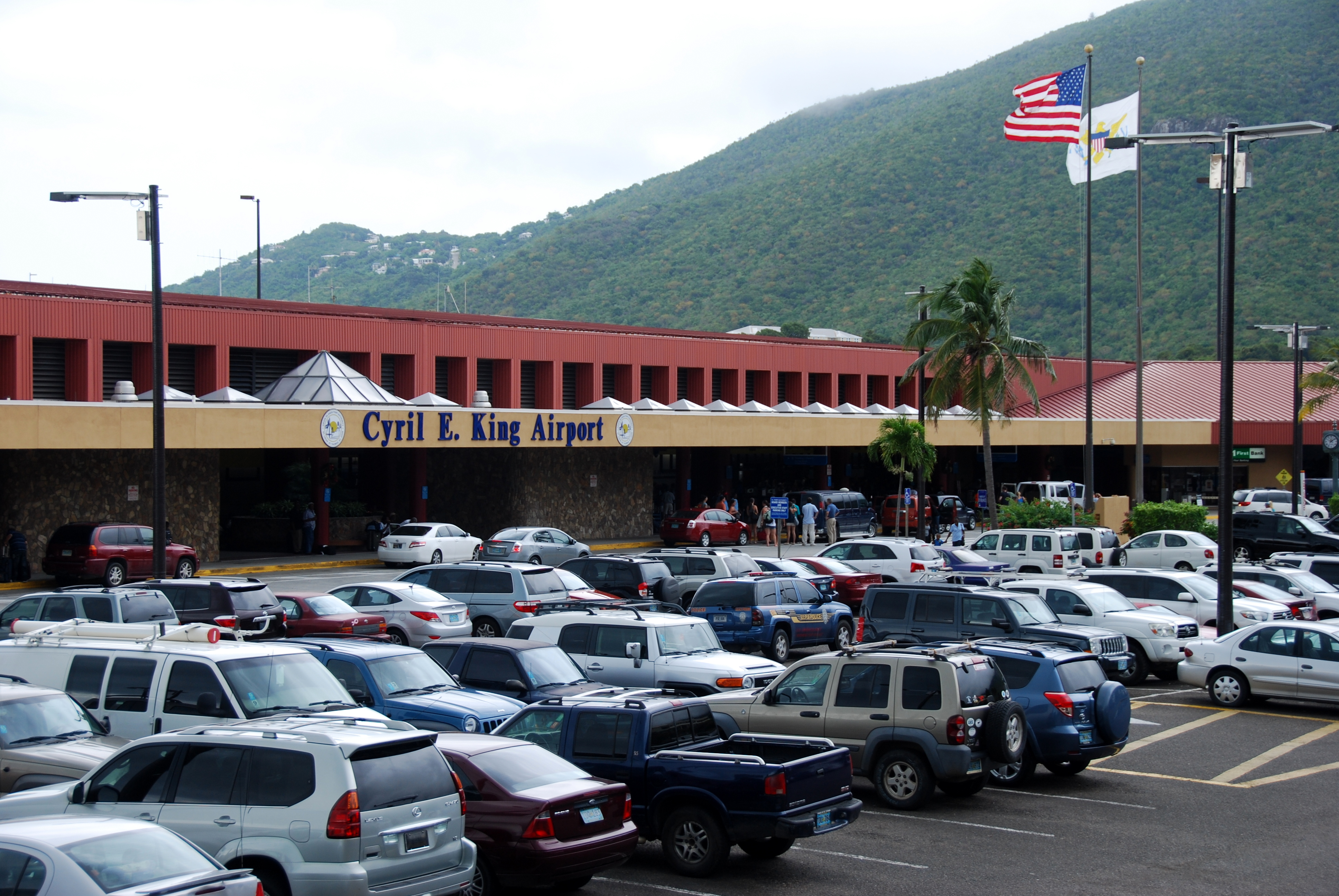
- IATA: STT; ICAO: TIST; FAA LID: STT

Summary
- Airport type: Public
- Owner: Virgin Islands Port Authority
- Location: Saint Thomas, U.S. Virgin Islands
- Elevation AMSL: 24 ft (7.3 m)
- Coordinates: 18°20′14″N 064°58′24″W
- Website: www.viport.com/cekastt

Maps
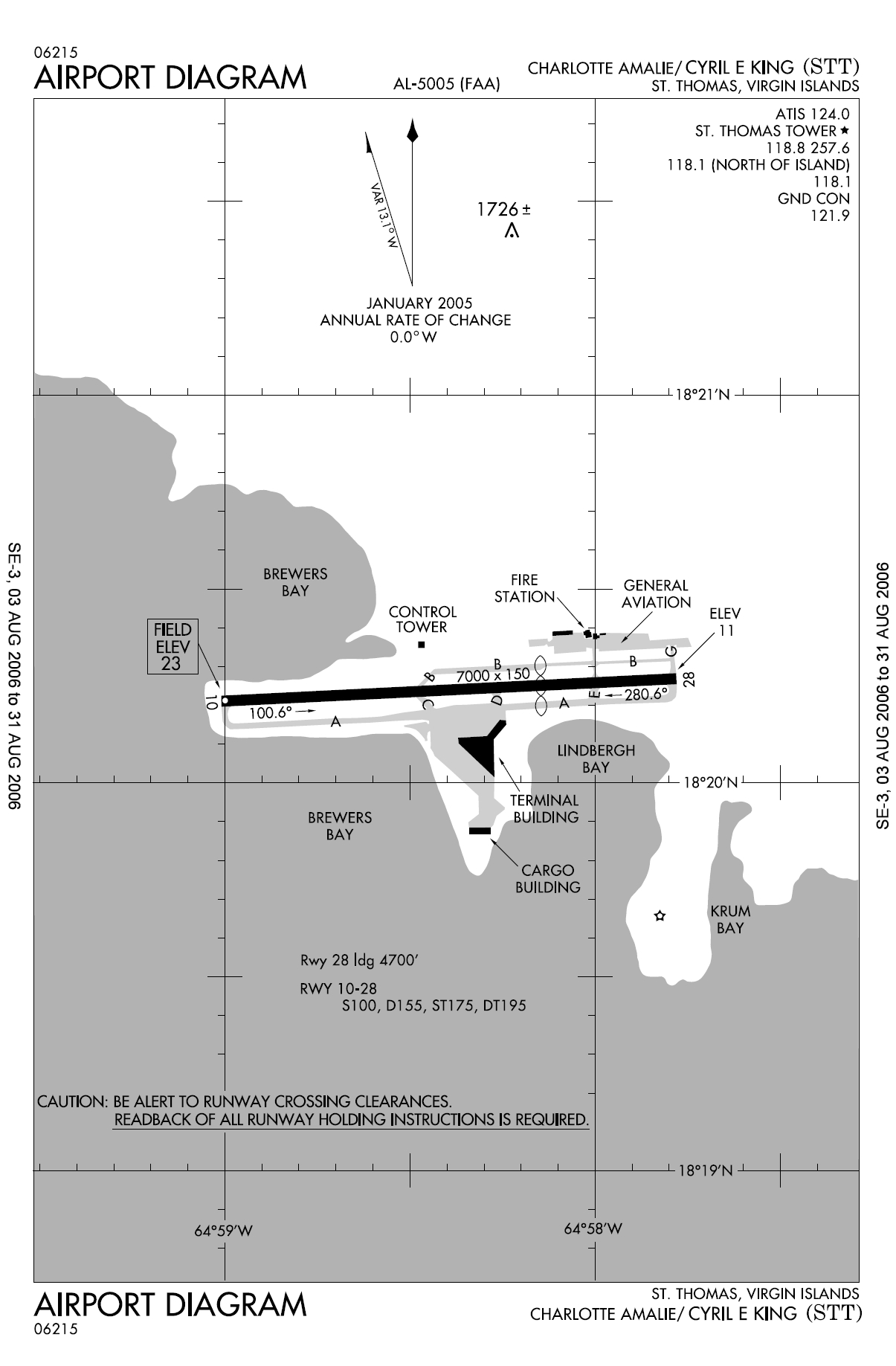
- FAA airport diagram
- Interactive map of Cyril E. King Airport

Runways
Direction	Length		Surface
Direction	ft	m	Surface
10/28	7,000	2,134	Asphalt

Statistics (2025)
- Total Passengers: 1,589,000
- Aircraft operations: 53,021
- Source: Federal Aviation Administration

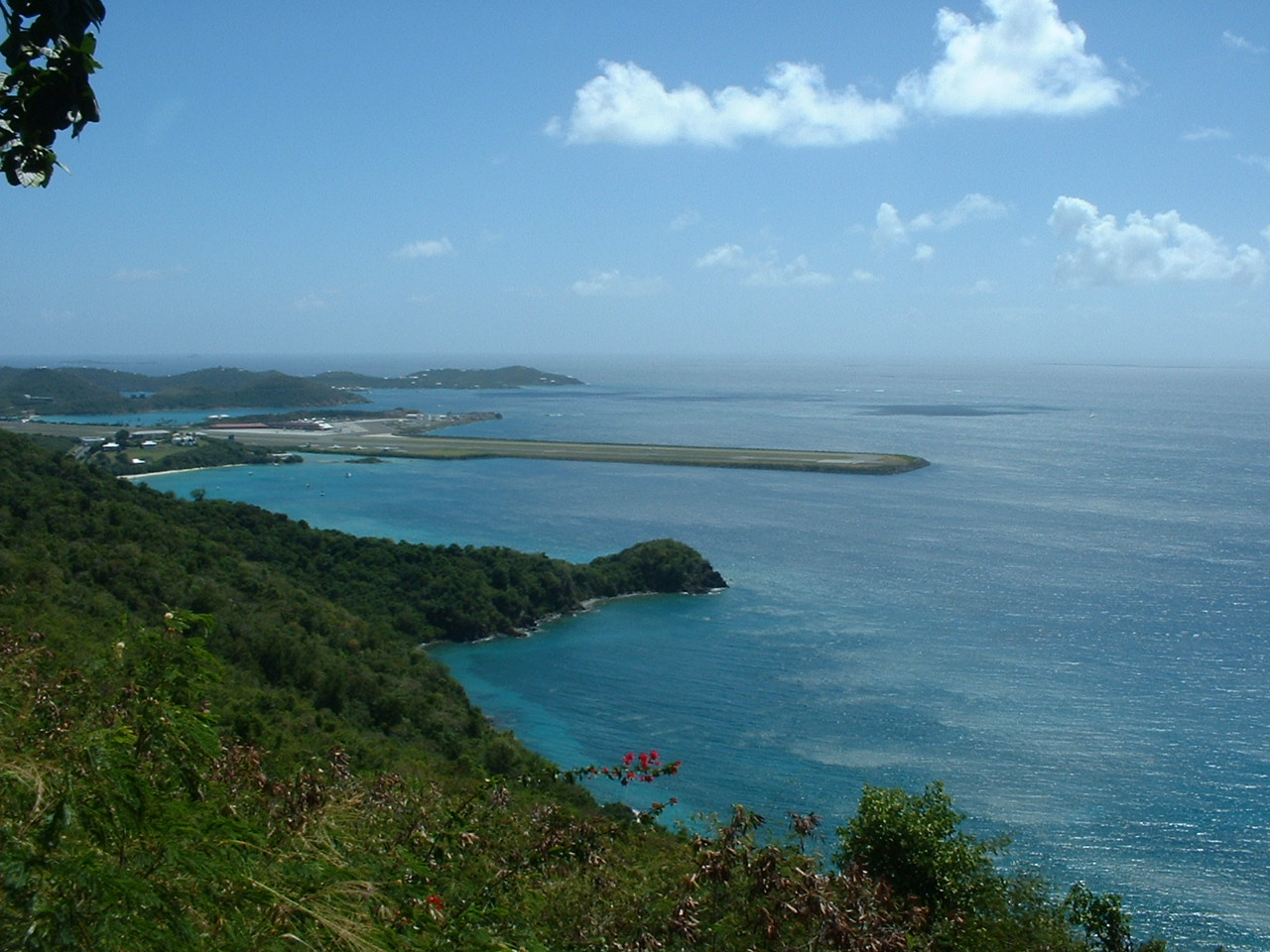
The Cyril E. King Airport from an observation overlook

Cyril E. King Airport (IATA: STT, ICAO: TIST, FAA LID: STT) is a public airport located two miles (3 km) west of the central business district in the town of Charlotte Amalie on the island of St. Thomas in the United States Virgin Islands. It is currently the busiest airport in the United States Virgin Islands, and one of the busiest in the eastern Caribbean, servicing 1,403,000 passengers from July 2015 through June 2016. The airport also serves the island of St. John and is additionally often used by those travelling to the nearby British Virgin Islands.

Although passports are not required for U.S. citizens who are visiting the U.S. Virgin Islands from other U.S. jurisdictions, all passengers bound for the continental United States and Puerto Rico must pass through U.S. Customs and Border Protection screening before boarding their flight. Private planes can either use CBP Preclearance or arrive in the continental United States or Puerto Rico as an international arrival.

The airport operates one main runway that is 7,000 ft × 150 ft (2,134 m × 46 m) long. The terminal operates 11 gates.

== History ==
Originally known as Mosquito Bay in 1927, the airstrip was the only facility which served the island of St. Thomas. The facility was named after a nearby grassy swamp, which was renamed to Lindbergh Bay after Charles Lindbergh used it to land the Spirit of St. Louis. The first passengers landed in 1928, and the airstrip remained in civilian use until it was purchased by the US government on 1 September, 1935. The airstrip was renamed Bourne Field, after the first person to fly non-stop from the United States to Nicaragua. The field was composed of two 1,600 feet (490 m) long unpaved runways used to train aviators of the US Marine Corps. In 1940, the US Navy ordered a major expansion of the base, which saw the extension and paving of the runways along with construction work to accommodate a VMS-3 observation squadron. Once World War II began, VMS-3 patrolled the surrounding areas for enemy submarines, operating the J2F-A Duck, Vought SU-2 Corsair, OS2N-1 Kingfisher, and Douglas SBD Dauntless. By 1944, enemy submarine activity decreased. This left the base redundant, and was handed over to civilian authorities to operate in 1946.

Following the closure of the Marine base, the airport was leased to the US Department of the Interior for civilian use. However, the Navy reserved the power to reactivate the airport for military purposes. After the transfer, the former hangar was converted into the civilian terminal and named after President Harry S. Truman. The airport was eventually renamed for former governor Cyril King in 1984.

On 25 March 1950 the Department of the Interior leased the land to the Virgin Islands. However, the department canceled the lease on 1 July 1954 citing violations of the agreement. According to the department, the Virgin Islands failed to register and report financial transactions relating to the land. As a result of the cancelation, the property was given to the US Virgin Islands Corporation.

Historically, a number of airlines operated scheduled passenger jet service into St. Thomas in the past. These air carriers included Air Florida with Douglas DC-9-10s, Caribair with McDonnell Douglas DC-9-30s, Eastern Airlines with Boeing 727-100s, 727-200s and 757-200s, Midway Airlines with Boeing 737-200s and McDonnell Douglas MD-87s, Pan American World Airways (Pan Am) with Boeing 727-100s and 727-200s as well as wide body Airbus A300B4s and Airbus A310s, and Trans Caribbean Airways with Boeing 727-200s. Trans Caribbean, Pan Am and Caribair were all operating jet service into St. Thomas by the late 1960s with the airport runway only being 4,658 feet (1,420 m) in length at the time.

One air carrier that has served St. Thomas for many years is American Airlines, which began serving St. Thomas in 1970 following its acquisition of and merger with Trans Caribbean Airways. In 1975, American as well as Eastern and Pan Am were serving the airport with Boeing 727-100 jetliners, American and Pan Am with nonstop 727 flights from New York Kennedy Airport with American also operating direct one stop 727 service from Boston and Providence, RI, and Eastern with nonstop 727 flights from Miami and San Juan as well as direct 727 flights from Chicago O'Hare Airport, Cleveland and Dallas/Fort Worth.

By 1994, American was operating wide body Airbus A300-600R jets into St. Thomas with nonstop service from Miami and San Juan with direct one stop A300 flights from Chicago O'Hare Airport, Orlando and Philadelphia and was also flying nonstop Boeing 757-200 service from New York Kennedy Airport. Other airlines operating jet service into St. Thomas at this same time in 1994 included Continental Airlines with nonstop Boeing 727-200 service from New York Newark Airport, Delta Air Lines with nonstop Boeing 757-200 service from Atlanta and St. Croix as well as direct one stop 757 service from Washington Reagan National Airport, Private Jet Expeditions (operating as National Airlines at this time) with nonstops from Atlanta and direct one stop service from Chicago Midway Airport flown with McDonnell Douglas MD-80s, and USAir with nonstops from Baltimore and direct one stop service from Pittsburgh flown with Boeing 727-200s.

Historically the airport hosted Air Force One and Two, respectively, carrying Bill Clinton, Al Gore, and Joe Biden using Boeing 707s and later Boeing 757s.

Cyril E. King Airport also hosted a number of charter jet airliners including the Boeing 757, Boeing 767 and the McDonnell Douglas DC-10. A new passenger terminal opened in November 1990.

== Facilities and aircraft ==
Cyril E. King Airport covers an area of 280 acres (110 ha) which contains one asphalt paved runway (10/28) measuring 7,000 ft × 150 ft (2,134 m × 46 m). For the 12-month period ending September 30, 2017, the airport had 61,255 aircraft operations, an average of 167 per day: 58% air taxi, 14% scheduled commercial, 27% general aviation and 1% military. During the same period, there were 98 aircraft based at this airport: 59% multi-engine, 35% single engine, 3% helicopters, 2% jet engine and 1% ultralight. There is also one flight school at the airport, Ace Flight Center. Execujet Flight Services and St. Thomas Jet Center, on the north side of the runway, handle private aviation. Due to the field being located next to high terrain, runway 28 has a large displaced threshold, taking up roughly 1/3 of the runway.

=== Terminal ===
The two-story terminal has 11 gates in two departure areas. The main section serves flights bound for the United States and Puerto Rico. It contains a restaurant and bar, gift shop, and duty-free store. Three smaller departure lounges serve international and St. Croix departures.

Arriving passengers from the United States and Puerto Rico over the age of 18 are greeted with complimentary samples of Cruzan Rum.

=== Cyril E. King Airport Terminal Modernization and Expansion Projects ===
Plans to expand the Cyril E. King Airport terminal include a new departure lounge on the second floor and the installation of jet bridges. A $230 million modernization plan for the airport was announced in June 2018.

The airport upgrades will include a pedestrian bridge as well as a ferry terminal to improve transportation.

On September 3, 2019 the VIPA board approved a $175 million budget for FY 2020.

In 2019, Congressional delegate Stacey Plaskett announced new Transportation Department grants to V.I. Airports to redesign the apron and improve lighting on the Cyril E. King airport runway, as well as to improve the runway at Henry E. Rohlsen Airport. On November 22, 2019, the Transportation Department officially awarded a $2 million grant for the Cyril E. King Airport's modernization. VIPA said that phase one of construction would begin in April. Each of the four phases may take from 18 to 24 months to complete, for a total of 6–8 years and a cost of $250 million. On Wednesday, May 26, 2021, the Cyril E. King Airport broke ground for phase 1 construction.

In 2023, the FAA announced $12.2 million in grants, for rehabilitating Taxiway A to maintain the structural integrity of the pavement and to minimize foreign object debris. The project has a total of five phases. Phase 2 funds the west 3,300 ft. of the 7,000-ft. taxiway. Future phases will fund the design and construction of the remainder of the taxiway.

== Airlines and destinations ==
=== Passenger ===
Airlines	Destinations
American Airlines	Charlotte, Dallas/Fort Worth, Miami, New York–JFK, Philadelphia; Seasonal: Chicago–O'Hare
Breeze Airways	Tampa (begins December 16, 2026)
Cape Air	Anguilla, Nevis, Saint Barthélemy, Saint Croix, Saint Kitts, San Juan, Vieques; Seasonal: Tortola
Contour Airlines	Dominica–Douglas-Charles, St. Maarten
Delta Air Lines	Atlanta; Seasonal: Boston, New York–JFK
Fly The Whale	Saint Croix
JetBlue	San Juan; Seasonal: Boston
Sky High	Santo Domingo–Las Américas
Southwest Airlines	Baltimore, Orlando; Seasonal: Nashville (begins March 13, 2027)
Sun Country Airlines	Seasonal: Minneapolis/St. Paul
Tradewind Aviation	Saint Barthélemy
United Airlines	Houston–Intercontinental, Newark, Washington–Dulles; Seasonal: Chicago–O'Hare
VI Airlink	Anegada, Tortola
Vieques Air Link	Ceiba

=== Dolphin Water Taxi ===
On February 8, 2020, Dolphin Water Taxi opened new facilities at the Cyril E. King Airport baggage claim east of the Tropic Tours window as well as the Red Hook Urman Victor Fredericks Marine Terminal.

=== The Last Mile Water Taxi ===
In May 2023, a new provider of Water Taxi services to St John and The British Virgin Islands was launched, utilizing a former Dohm's Water Taxi wave piercing catamaran and offering pickup service right from baggage claim.

== Top destinations ==
Busiest domestic routes from STT (June 2024 – May 2025)
Rank	City	Passengers	Carrier
1	Miami, Florida	135,860	American
2	(Georgia (U.S. state)) Atlanta, Georgia	110,870	Delta
3	San Juan, Puerto Rico	101,130	Cape Air, JetBlue, Silver
4	Charlotte, North Carolina	73,990	American
5	(New York (state)) New York City, New York	70,600	American, Delta
6	Fort Lauderdale, Florida	67,080	Spirit
7	(United States Virgin Islands) Christiansted, St. Croix	58,940	Cape Air, Silver, Sea Flight
8	Orlando, Florida	52,310	Spirit
9	(Virginia) Washington–Dulles	38,550	United
10	Newark, New Jersey	29,370	United

=== Airline market share ===
Largest airlines at STT (June 2024 – May 2025)
Rank	Airline	Passengers	Share
1	American Airlines	531,000	32.84%
2	Delta Air Lines	306,000	18.88%
3	Spirit Airlines	225,000	13.89%
4	United Airlines	200,000	12.35%
5	JetBlue	137,000	8.48%
	Other	219,000	13.56%

== Accidents and incidents ==
- On December 28, 1970, Trans Caribbean Airways Flight 505 operated with a Boeing 727-200 jetliner made a hard landing and ran off the side of the runway. Two of the 48 passengers died in the subsequent fire, and the aircraft was then destroyed by the ensuing conflagration.
- On April 27, 1976, American Airlines Flight 625 operated with a Boeing 727-100 jetliner ran off the end of the runway, killing 37 of the 88 on board. The old St. Thomas runway was 4,658 feet long at the time. Following the crash, American Airlines (AA) suspended jet service to the airport and began operating Convair 440 propliners instead for service to nearby St. Croix (STX) for connections to American mainline jet flights until a new, longer 7,000 foot runway was constructed. These CV-440 flights were operated by a division of AA, American Inter-Island, as an interim service until American elected to resume mainline jet aircraft operations into St. Thomas with the advent of the longer runway. The American Inter-Island Convair 440 aircraft were owned by American Airlines and flown and maintained by Antilles Air Boats, a seaplane operator in the Virgin Islands.
- On March 25, 1977, Douglas C-53 N692A of Island Traders was damaged beyond economic repair in a heavy landing.
- On September 17, 1989, Douglas DC-3 N4425N, Douglas C-47s N100SD, N4471J and N4577Z; and Douglas C-49J N28346 of Aero Virgin Islands; along with Douglas C-47A N101AP of Four Star Air Cargo; were damaged beyond economic repair by Hurricane Hugo.
- On December 30, 2003, Douglas DC-3C N781T of Tol-Air Services was substantially damaged when the starboard undercarriage collapsed on landing after a flight that originated at San Juan, Puerto Rico.
- On July 19, 2006, Douglas DC-3C N782T of Tol-Air Services ditched into the sea off Charlotte Amalie after an engine failure shortly after take-off from Cyril E. King Airport. All four people on board escaped as the aircraft floated for about ten minutes before sinking. The aircraft now lies in 100 feet (30 m) of water and is a dive site.
- A Kestrel Convair C-131F, registration N8277Q performing a freight flight from St. Thomas (US Virgin Islands) to unknown destination with 2 crew, departed St. Thomas' runway 28 and was in the initial climb around 07:47L (11:47Z) when the tower observed smoke from the left-hand engine (P&W R-2800). The crew declared emergency reporting an engine fire and loss of hydraulics and initiated a return to St. Thomas' runway 10, where the aircraft touched down but could not slow. The airplane veered right off the runway, broke through the airport fence and came to a stop on the airport access road. No injuries occurred, the airplane received substantial damage. The airport was closed for several hours. The FAA reported the aircraft went off the runway and received substantial damage.
- On October 13, 2012, a Piper Aztec, N5553Y, departing nearby St. Croix carrying three passengers, crashed approximately eight miles south of Cyril E. King Airport. There was one survivor. After a year-long investigation, it was determined that the pilot suffered spatial disorientation, descended before he needed to and then crashed into the water.
- On June 17, 2015, an American Airlines Boeing 757 preparing to fly to John F. Kennedy International Airport was grounded due to a mechanical failure. After returning to the gate, an airport service vehicle collided with the aircraft, severely damaging one of the aircraft's jet engines. No injuries occurred.
- On September 6, 2017, Hurricane Irma caused severe damage to the terminal especially around gate 6. No injuries were reported.
