= Auguste George Airport =

- IATA: NGD; ICAO: TUPA

Summary
- Airport type: Public
- Operator: n/a
- Location: Anegada
- Elevation AMSL: 30 ft (9.1 m)
- Coordinates: 18°43′39″N 64°19′41″W

Map
- Location in the British Virgin Islands

Runways
Direction	Length		Surface
Direction	m	ft	Surface
09/27	762	2,500	Pavement
- Source: DAFIF

Auguste George Airport (IATA: NGD, ICAO: TUPA) is the northernmost airport in the British Virgin Islands and is located on the island of Anegada. The airport is named for Captain Auguste George.

== Airlines and destinations ==
One scheduled carrier VI Airlink, links the British Virgin Islands and St. Thomas US Virgin Islands to Anegada. There are only a handful of air charter companies who serve the island. Island Birds Air Charter and Fly BVI Ltd offer direct on-demand air charter service from Beef Island (Tortola), Virgin Gorda, St. Thomas, San Juan, Antigua and St. Maarten to the aerodrome on Anegada. This service is also provided by Island Birds Air Charter.

Airlines	Destinations
VI Airlink	Tortola
