= Air BVI =

Airline of the British Virgin Islands

| IATA | ICAO | Call sign |
|---|---|---|
| BL | — | — |
- Founded: 1971; British Virgin Islands
- Ceased operations: 1993
- Operating bases: Tortola Airport (airline headquarters); San Juan Airport
- Fleet size: 3

Air BVI was an airline which operated and was based in the British Virgin Islands (BVI). Founded in 1971, by 1975 it had significantly added capacity to its fleet with the introduction of two Douglas DC-3 aircraft. Air BVI primarily flew between the Beef Island Airport (EIS) on Tortola and Luis Muñoz Marín International Airport (SJU, then best known as "Isla Verde International Airport") in San Juan, Puerto Rico, providing connecting flights to and from major air carriers serving San Juan in order to enable tourists to visit the British Virgin Islands as well as providing transportation for local BVI residents and also served other destinations in the BVI such as Anegada and Virgin Gorda.

Air BVI went insolvent liquidation in 1991, although it continued to operate out of bankruptcy for nearly two and a half years. In May 1993 it suffered its only major incident when one of its aircraft overran the runway at Beef Island on Tortola during an aborted takeoff, and landed in the sea. However, the accident resulted in no significant injuries.

== Routes ==
The 15 April 1975 Official Airline Guide (OAG) listed four roundtrip nonstop flights operated on a daily basis by Air BVI between Tortola and San Juan with small Britten-Norman BN-2 Islander twin prop commuter aircraft which featured STOL capabilities. In 1979, the airline was operating larger Douglas DC-3 aircraft on all of its flights between Tortola and San Juan.

The 16 December 1980 Air BVI system timetable listed nonstop service between the airline's small hub in Tortola and Anegada, Antigua, St. Thomas, U.S. Virgin Islands, San Juan and Virgin Gorda with flights operated with 30-passenger seat Douglas DC-3 aircraft and eight-passenger seat Britten-Norman Islander aircraft. According to this timetable, the airline was operating seven roundtrip DC-3 flights on a daily basis between Tortola and San Juan in addition to "no reservation shuttle" service between Tortola and Virgin Gorda with five daily roundtrips (with a one way flight time of five minutes) operated with the Islander aircraft as well as flying one stop DC-3 service twice a week between Antigua and San Juan via a connection in Tortola.

By 1985, Air BVI had replaced its DC-3 aircraft with larger Hawker Siddeley HS 748 turboprops and was operating up to seven roundtrip HS 748 flights a day nonstop between Tortola and San Juan in addition to flying twice daily nonstop service between Virgin Gorda and San Juan with Britten-Norman Islander aircraft. In 1989, the airline was continuing to operate nonstop HS 748 turboprop service between Tortola and San Juan in addition to nonstop Islander flights between Virgin Gorda and San Juan and had also added nonstop HS 748 service operated six days a week between San Juan and La Romana, Dominican Republic.

== Fleet ==
Air BVI operated the following aircraft types at various times during its existence:

- Britten-Norman BN-2 Islander
- Douglas DC-3
- Hawker Siddeley HS 748
- Short 330, as Atlantic Air BVI
