= Tradewind Aviation =

American airline

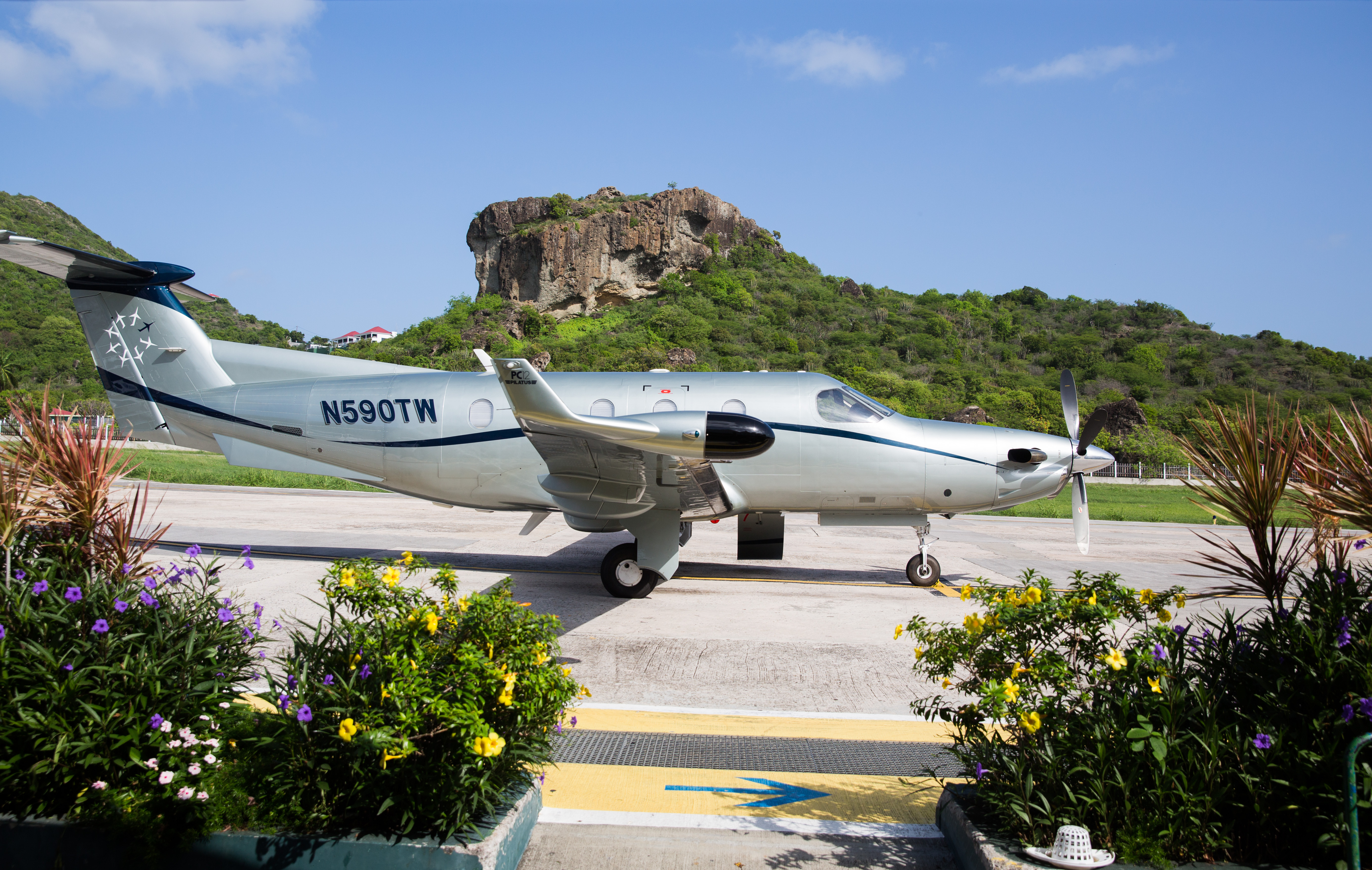
- One of Tradewind Aviation's Pilatus PC-12s in St. Barths
| IATA | ICAO | Call sign |
|---|---|---|
| TJ | GPD | GOODSPEED |
- Founded: 2001
- AOC #: TWYA123K
- Hubs: Westchester County Airport; Waterbury–Oxford Airport; Luis Muñoz Marín International Airport; Witham Field; Hudson Valley Regional Airport
- Secondary hubs: Teterboro Airport; Rémy de Haenen Airport
- Fleet size: 40
- Destinations: 17
- Headquarters: Oxford, Connecticut
- Key people: Eric Zipkin (CEO); David Zipkin (CCO)
- Employees: 350
- Website: www.flytradewind.com

Tradewind Aviation, LLC, doing business as Tradewind Aviation and Tradewind Shuttle, is an American airline headquartered at the Waterbury-Oxford Airport in Oxford, Connecticut, United States. Tradewind Aviation provides private and scheduled service in the Northeast, Southeast, and the Caribbean, as well as aircraft management services. The air charter company is best known for its Westchester to Nantucket summer ticket books, and its Puerto Rico to St. Barths scheduled service.

== History ==
Founded in 2001, Tradewind Aviation commenced operations utilizing a single Cessna Caravan. Brothers Eric and David Zipkin, both pilots and aviation enthusiasts, recognized a gap in service on shorter flights, initially on the Cape and Islands, and began operations in 2002. Charter service expanded throughout America and the Caribbean, with authorization for scheduled flights coming in 2005 and eventually expanding to 11 destinations. Each domestic Tradewind scheduled service flight within the United States departs and arrives at an FBO.

Caribbean network flights operate from normal terminals. Tradewind offers premium service at Luis Muñoz Marín International Airport in San Juan with a semi-private lounge area while customers await their trips to the high-end Caribbean destinations served by Tradewind. Tradewind operates year-round service to Gustaf III Airport in St. Barthelemy, providing the only year-round, nonstop scheduled service between this ultra-luxe French territory and the United States, which it has operated since 2006.

In June 2019, Tradewind launched a jet card, called "Goodspeed." The program offers fixed, one-way rates on its PC-12 fleet in three service areas, 300 nautical miles from Westchester County Airport in New York, Palm Beach International Airport in Florida, and San Juan Luis Muñoz Marín Airport in the Caribbean. Jet cards are offered in 10, 25 and 40-hour denominations.

In March 2022, Tradewind marked a major fleet renewal and expansion program with the purchase of 20 new Pilatus PC-12 NGX aircraft in a deal valued at over $100 million, with deliveries proceeding at 3-4 per year through 2027. The program cemented Tradewind's status as the operator of one of the world's largest fleets of Pilatus PC-12s, and the largest available for charter.

In October 2022, Tradewind opened a new base at Hudson Valley Regional Airport near Poughkeepsie, New York for in-house and open-market hangar space.

In September 2023, Tradewind opened a new hub in Stuart, Florida at Witham Field, serving the Southeast market.

In June 2024, Tradewind announced plans to offer scheduled service from Palm Beach to Marsh Harbour and North Eleuthera in the Abacos, Bahamas, which began in December 2024. With the inauguration of Donald Trump in January 2025, Tradewind moved scheduled service flights in its southeast region from Palm Beach International Airport, to Witham Field, in Stuart, Florida.

Scheduled service from Stuart to Nassau, and from Fort Lauderdale to Marsh Harbour and North Eleuthera, began on December 11th, 2025.

In March 2026, Tradewind added Bedford/Hanscom Field (BED) as a new departure point, launching June 18, 2026, connecting to Martha's Vineyard and Nantucket, offering three daily flights to each destination.

In October 2026, Tradewind announced plans to offer scheduled service from Fort Lauderdale to Nassau, beginning on December 10th, 2026.

Since 2021, Tradewind has ranked in Condé Nast Traveler Readers' Choice Awards as one of America's top airlines, and has been voted 5th, 4th, and 3rd best.

Condé Nast Readers' Choice Awards - Top US Airline
| Year | Rank |
|---|---|
| 2021 | 5th |
| 2022 | 4th |
| 2023 | 3rd |
| 2024 | 4th |
| 2025 | 4th |
| 2026 | 4th |

Today, Tradewind is the second-largest operator of the Pilatus PC-12 in the U.S. and the world's largest operator of the PC-12 in scheduled airline service and for charter.

== Destinations ==
Tradewind Aviation Scheduled Destinations
| Country | State/Territory | Destination | Notes |
|---|---|---|---|
| Antigua and Barbuda | | Antigua | |
| Bahamas | | Marsh Harbour | |
| Bahamas | | North Eleuthera | |
| Bahamas | | Nassau | |
| France | Saint Barthélemy | Saint-Jean | |
| United States | Massachusetts | Bedford/Hanscom Field | |
| United States | Massachusetts | Martha's Vineyard | |
| United States | Massachusetts | Nantucket | |
| United States | New Jersey | Teterboro | |
| United States | New York | White Plains | Base |
| United States | Florida | Stuart | Base |
| United States | Florida | Fort Lauderdale | |
| United States | Puerto Rico | San Juan | Base |
| United States | U.S. Virgin Islands | St. Thomas | |
| United Kingdom | Anguilla | Anguilla | |
| United Kingdom | British Virgin Islands | Virgin Gorda | |
| United Kingdom | British Virgin Islands | Tortola | |

== Fleet ==
As of November 2026, Tradewind's fleet consists of the following aircraft:

Tradewind Aviation fleet
| Aircraft | In fleet | Orders |
|---|---|---|
| Pilatus PC-12/45 | 5 | 0 |
| Pilatus PC-12 NG | 20 | 0 |
| Pilatus PC-12 NGX | 14 | 0 |
| Pilatus PC-12 PRO | 1 | 11 |
| Total | 40 | 11 |

Tradewind Aviation historic fleet
| Aircraft | Introduced | Retired |
|---|---|---|
| Cessna 208B Grand Caravan | 2001 | 2013 |
| Cessna Citation CJ3 | 2007 | 2024 |
| Pilatus PC-12/47 | 2017 | 2026 |

== See also ==
- List of airlines of the United States
