= British Caribbean Airways =

Airline of the British Virgin Islands

IATA	ICAO	Call sign
EO	BCL	-
- Commenced operations: April 14, 1986
- Ceased operations: October 12, 1986
- Hubs: Terrance B. Lettsome International Airport
- Fleet size: 1

British Caribbean Airways (officially BCA Limited) was a short lived British airline. In February 1986, it was announced that the airline would be purchasing a BAe 146-100 plane, with a second ordered for November that year. In April 1986, the airline officially started a flight from Miami, Florida, to Tortola, British Virgin Islands (BVI), with an intermediate stop at Providenciales, Turks and Caicos Islands. Its flights into Tortola marked the only time this small airport in the BVI had a scheduled passenger jet service.

In August 1986, the managing director John Bull announced that they would be suspending their flights to the British Virgin Islands. On 12 October 1986, the airline operated its last flight.

== See also ==
- List of airlines of the British Virgin Islands
