= Aerostar Airport Holdings =

Company that operates and manages the Luis Muñoz Marín International Airport

- Company type: Privately held company Joint venture
- Industry: Transportation
- Genre: Airports
- Founded: March 14, 2012; 14 years ago
- Headquarters: San Juan, Puerto Rico
- Area served: Puerto Rico
- Key people: Jorge Hernández; President & CEO
- Services: Operates the Luis Muñoz Marín International Airport
- Owner: PSP Investments / AviAlliance; Grupo Aeroportuario del Sureste
- Website: www.aerostarairports.com

Aerostar Airport Holdings, LLC is the public–private partnership, privately held company, and limited liability company that operates and manages the Luis Muñoz Marín International Airport on behalf of the Puerto Rico Ports Authority. Since 2017, the company is 60% owned by Grupo Aeroportuario del Sureste, a Mexican airport management firm, and 40% by PSP Investments/AviAlliance. Aerostar has a forty-year lease to manage and upgrade the airport, including the investment of nearly $1.4 billion in capital improvements over the course of the lease.
