= VI Airlink =

Airline of the British Virgin Islands

IATA	ICAO	Call sign
V6	VIL	TURTLE DOVE
- Operating bases: Terrance B. Lettsome International Airport
- Focus cities: Antigua, Anegada, Virgin Gorda, St. Thomas
- Fleet size: 3
- Headquarters: Tortola, British Virgin Islands
- Website: www.viairlink.com

VI Airlink (or Virgin Islands Airlink) is an airline from the British Virgin Islands, with its license issued under the British Overseas Territory's air requirements. It is the only airline with airplanes registered in the B.V.I. It operates mostly chartered short-haul flights throughout the Caribbean from its base at Terrance B. Lettsome International Airport on Beef Island, using a fleet of three aircraft (a Beechcraft 1900 (VP-LVI) Beechcraft King Air (VP-LNB) and a Cessna 402 (VP-LAD)).

Scheduled services to Anegada are offered four times a week, from Beef Island/ Tortola connections from St. Thomas. Schedule service to Antigua twice a week Friday and Saturday. In 2009, the airline applied with the Federal Aviation Administration for the allowance to launch flights to San Juan, Puerto Rico.

VI Airlink is engaged in the medical emergency transport of British Virgin Islanders, with its airplanes being convertible accordingly.

In 2012 the airline was approved by the United States Federal Aviation Administration to fly directly to the United States, the first overseas territory carrier to gain access since 1993.

By mid-2015 it was expected that VI Airlink would establish a to/from flight service between the British Virgin Island's Beef Island near Tortola and the West Indies island Antigua. At the time, flights to the British Virgin Islands were only available in small planes and regional services.

In 2019, the airline was involved in a controversy when the BVI Airports Authority announced they wanted to build airport hangars and rent them to airlines at Beef Island, causing one of the airline's pilots to publicly criticize the airport authority.
