= Luis Muñoz Marín International Airport =

Airport serving San Juan, Puerto Rico

Luis Muñoz Marín International Airport Aeropuerto Internacional Luis Muñoz Marín

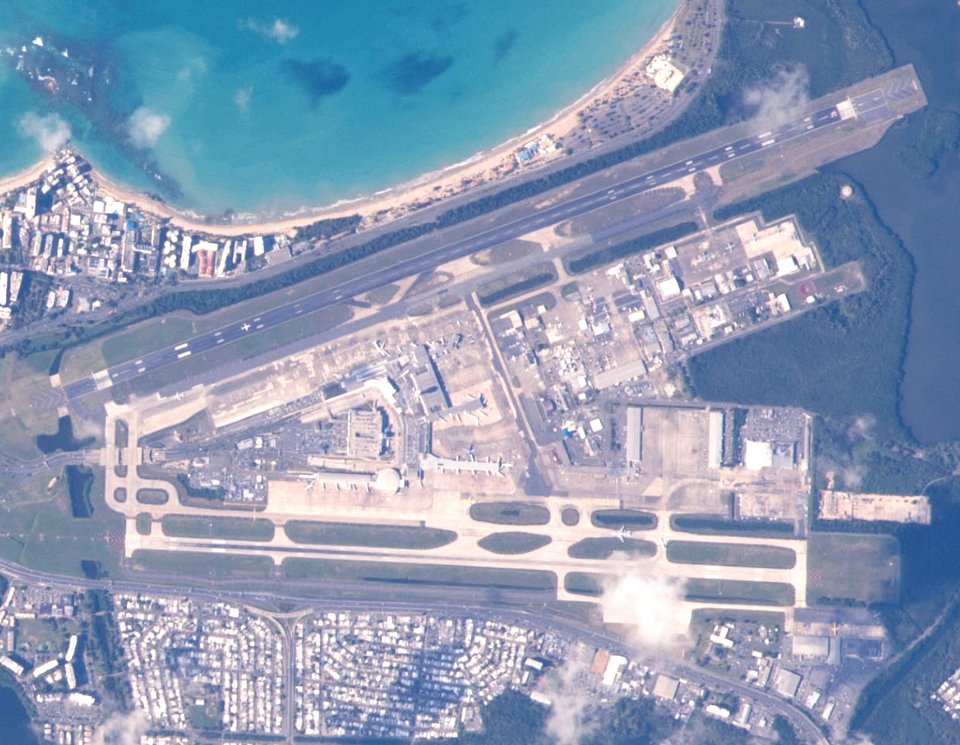
- Satellite view of SJU
- IATA: SJU; ICAO: TJSJ; FAA LID: SJU; WMO: 78526

Summary
- Airport type: Public–Private Partnership / Military
- Owner: Puerto Rico Ports Authority
- Operator: Aerostar Airport Holdings
- Serves: San Juan, Puerto Rico
- Location: Carolina, Puerto Rico
- Opened: May 22, 1955; 71 years ago
- Hub for: M&N Aviation; Tradewind Aviation
- Focus city for: JetBlue
- Operating base for: Cape Air; Frontier Airlines
- Elevation AMSL: 9 ft (2.7 m)
- Coordinates: 18°26′21″N 066°00′07″W
- Website: aeropuertosju.com

Maps
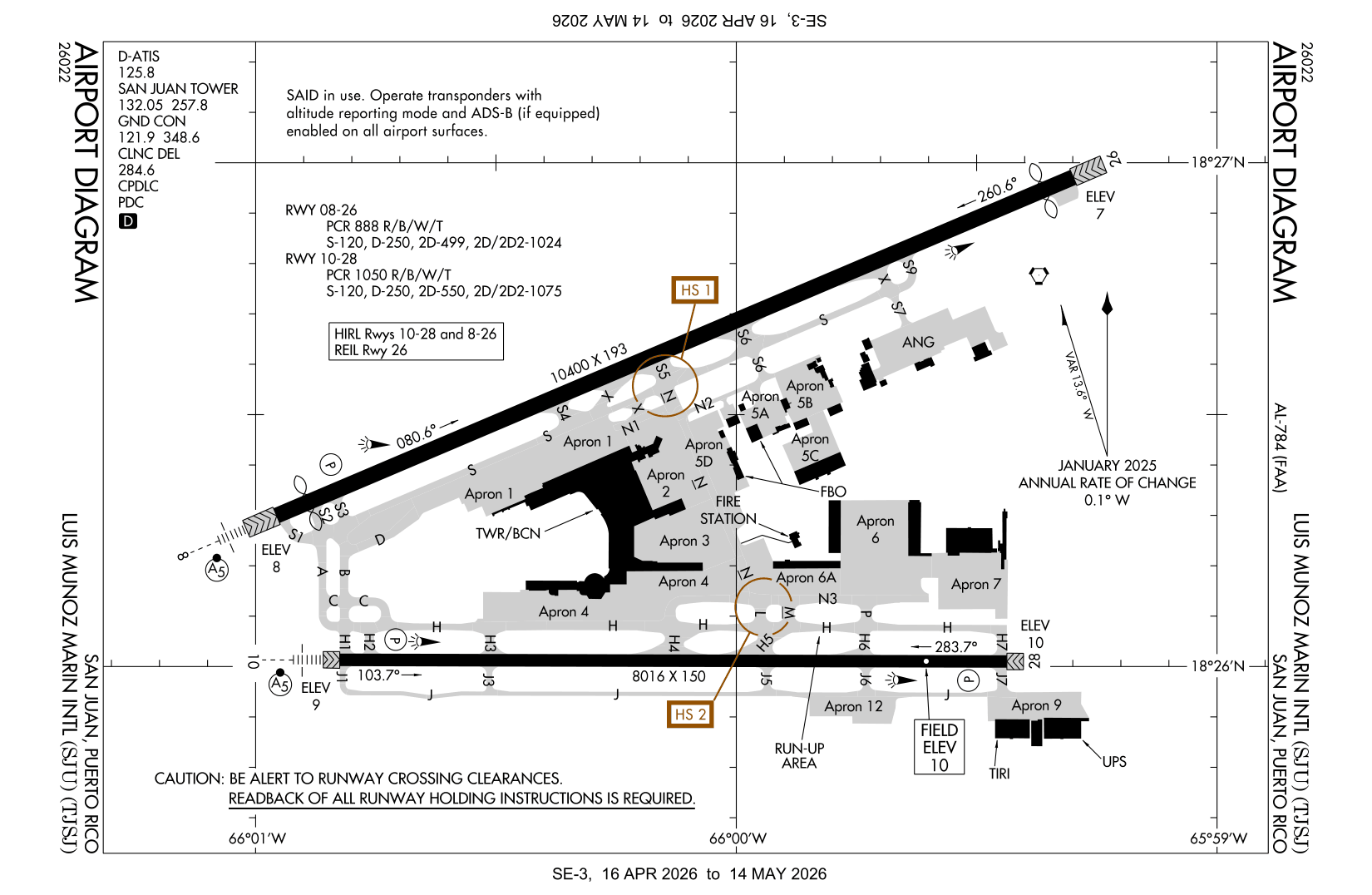
- FAA airport diagram
- Interactive map of SJU

Runways
Direction	Length		Surface
Direction	ft	m	Surface
8/26	10,400	3,170	Asphalt
10/28	8,016	2,443	Concrete

Statistics (2025)
- Total Passengers: 13,643,686
- Source: FAA

Luis Muñoz Marín International Airport (Spanish: Aeropuerto Internacional Luis Muñoz Marín) (IATA: SJU, ICAO: TJSJ, FAA LID: SJU), previously known as Isla Verde International Airport (Spanish: Aeropuerto Internacional de Isla Verde), is the main international airport of Puerto Rico serving the capital city and municipality of San Juan and its metropolitan area since 1955. Named after Luis Muñoz Marín, the first popularly elected governor of the archipelago and island, the 1,600 acre (647 ha) airport is located in the beachfront resort district of Isla Verde in the municipality of Carolina, about 4 to 7 miles (6.4 to 11.3 km) east of the Milla de Oro financial district in Hato Rey barrio, Condado resort area and Isla Grande secondary airport in Santurce barrio, and Old San Juan historic quarter and San Juan Cruise Port in San Juan Islet. SJU processed 13,643,689 total passengers in 2025, making it the busiest airport in Puerto Rico and the insular Caribbean.

Handling 93% of passenger flow and 90% of air cargo into Puerto Rico, SJU is the 39th busiest airport by passenger enplanement, 38th by total passenger traffic, 24th by international passenger traffic, and 23rd by cargo throughput in the United States and its territories. It is also the 46th busiest airport in North America and the 15th busiest airport in Latin America by total passenger traffic.

SJU is owned by the Puerto Rico Ports Authority and managed by Aerostar Airport Holdings, a public–private partnership operating the airport for 40 years, beginning in 2013. It was the second international airport to be privatized in the United States and its territories, and, as of 2025, it is the only currently privatized airport in the country.

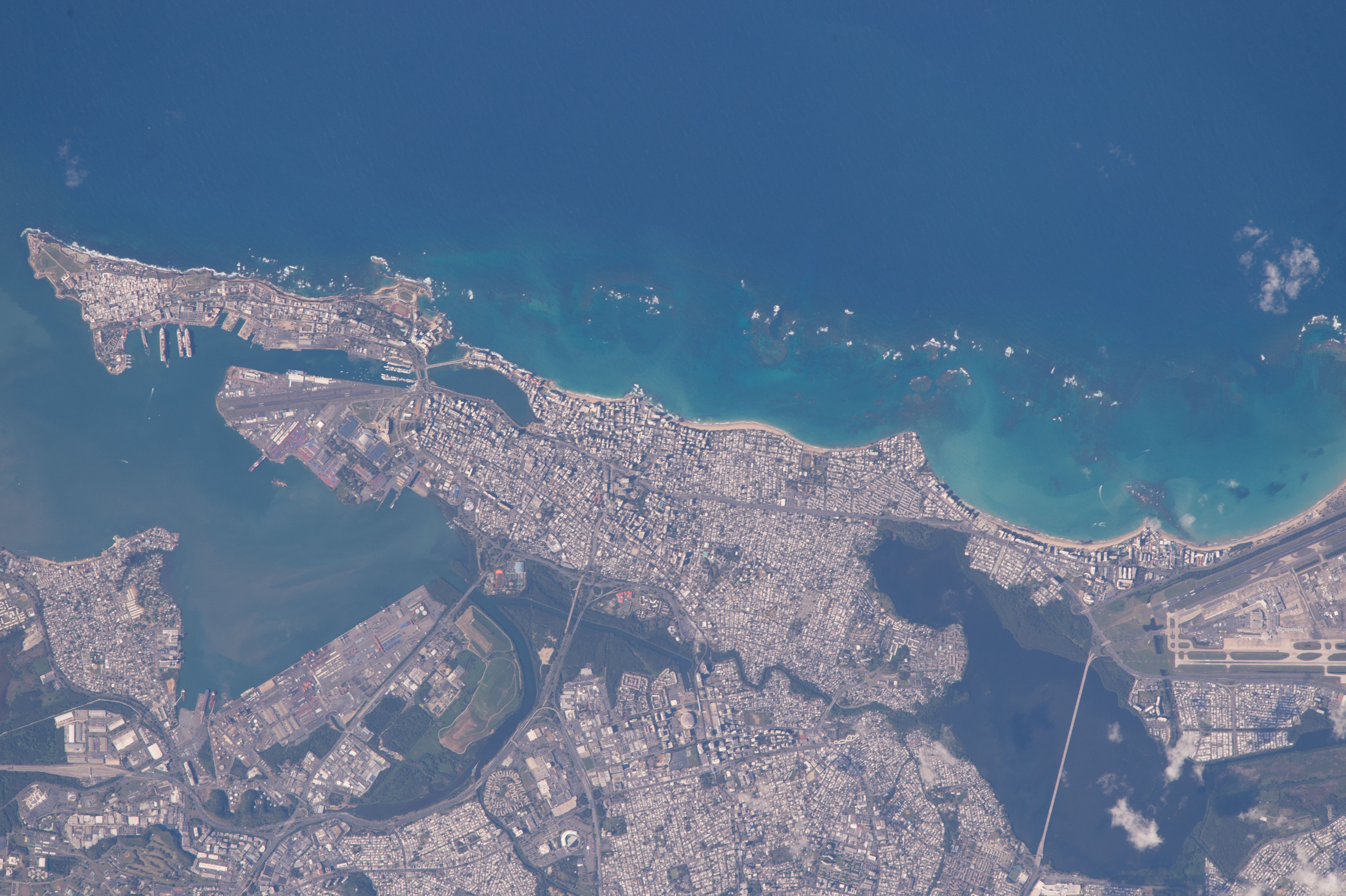
Satellite view from Old San Juan historic quarter (upper left) on San Juan Islet in San Juan to Isla Verde resort area with SJU airport (upper right) visible in Carolina, 2016

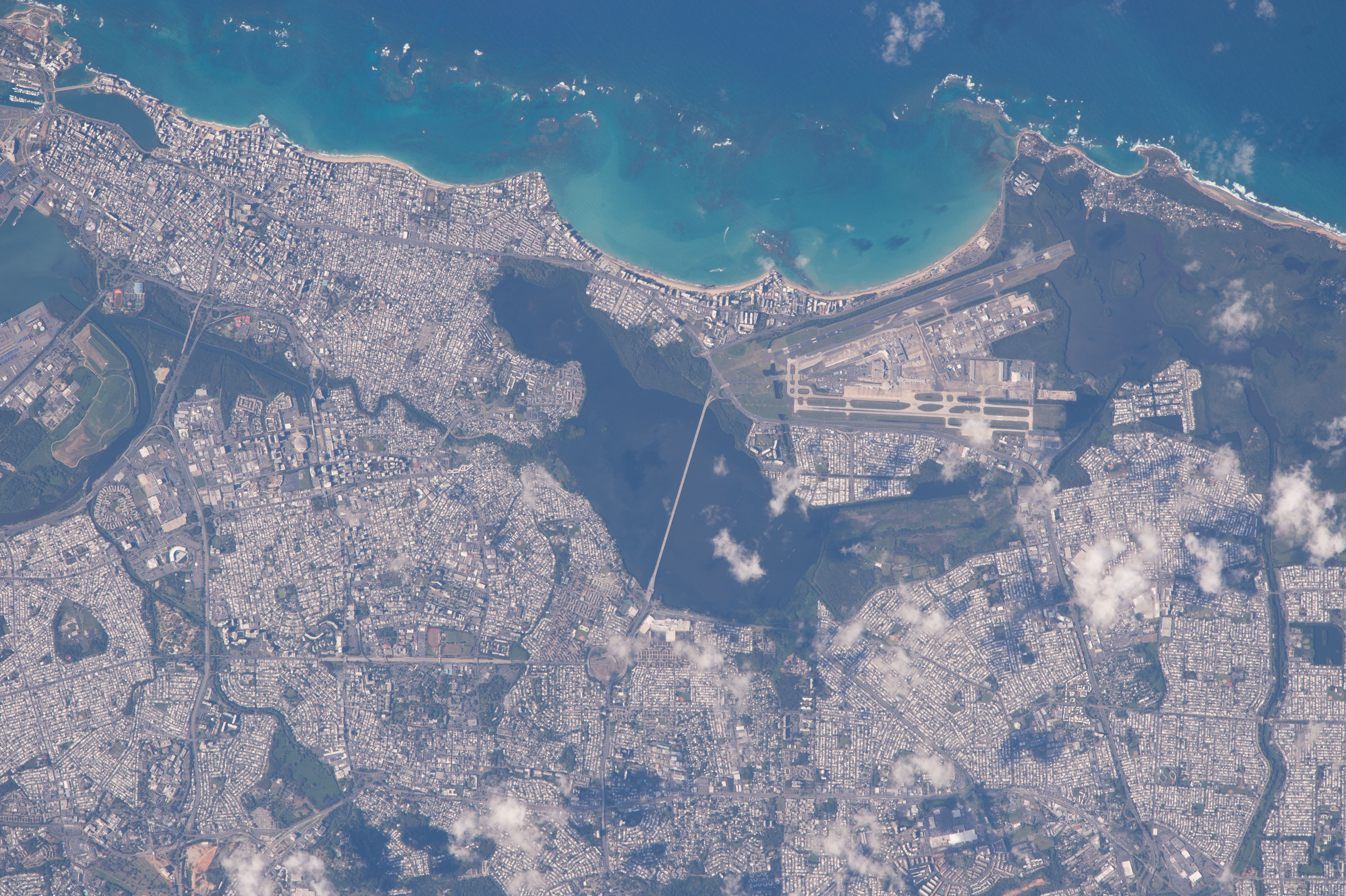
Satellite view from Condado district (upper left) in San Juan to Piñones area (upper right) in Loíza with Isla Verde and SJU visible (upper right) in Carolina, 2016

== History ==
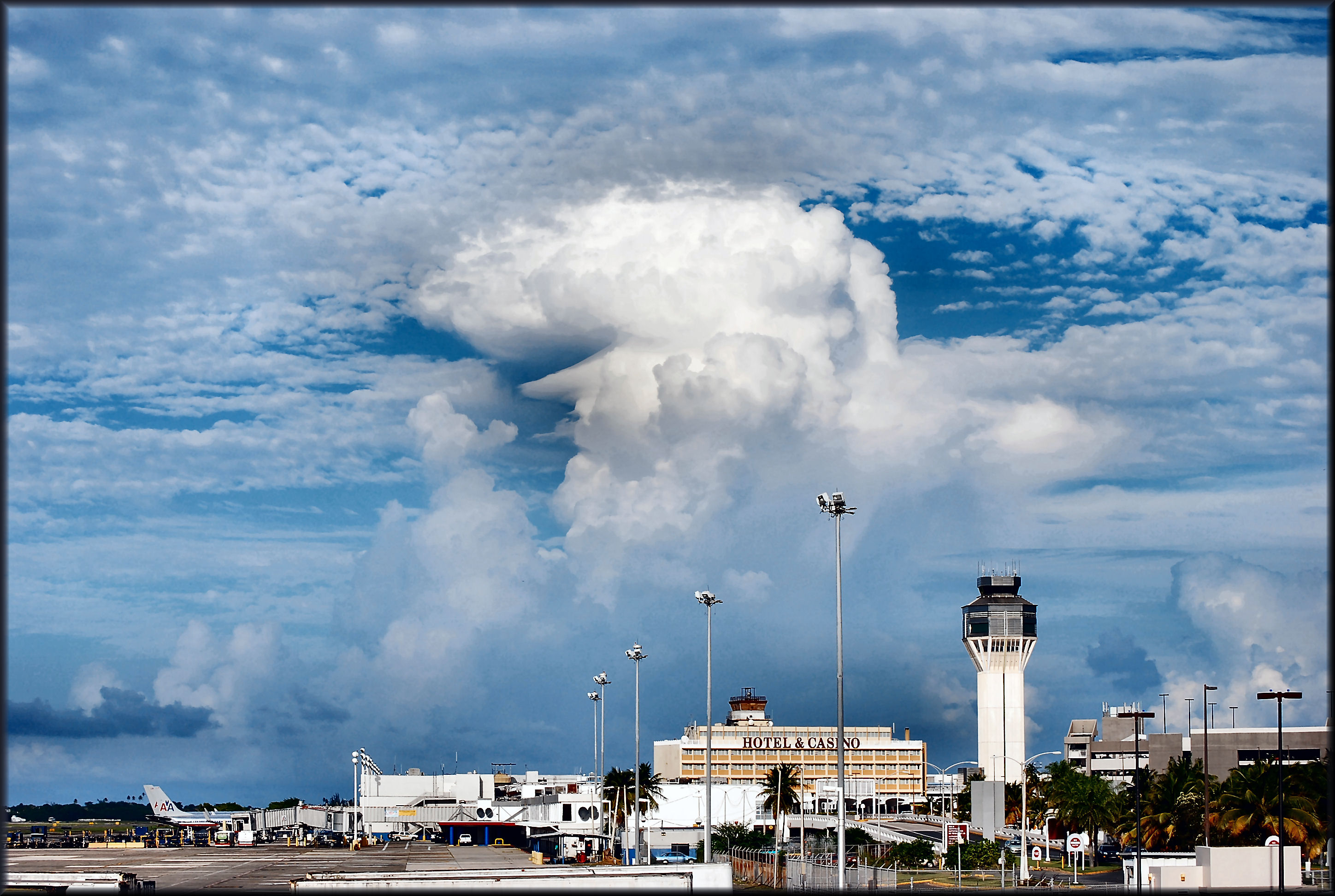
Luis Muñoz Marin International Airport in 2009 with clouds overhead

=== Evolution of the airport ===
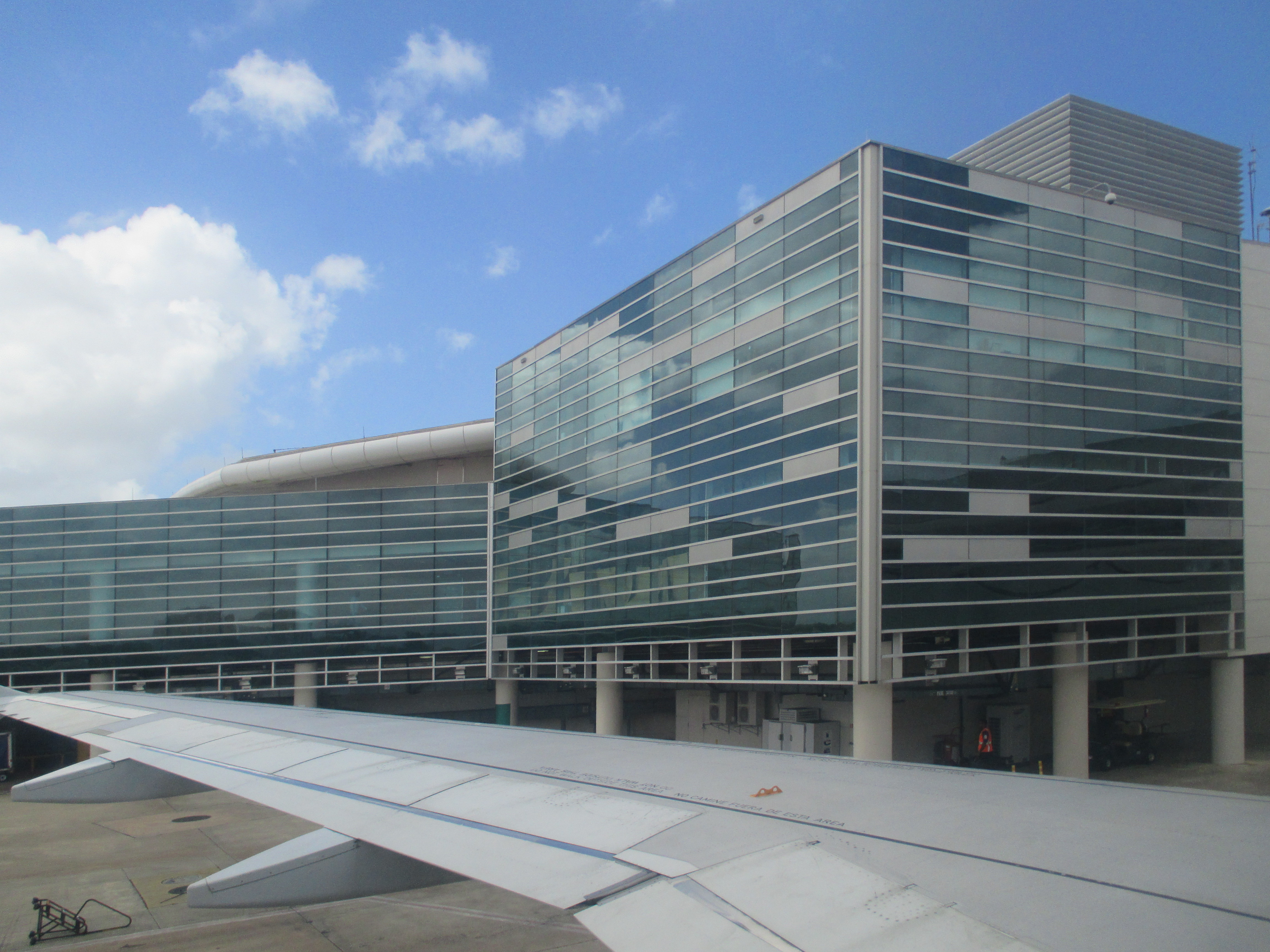
Terminal A facade view from the tarmac

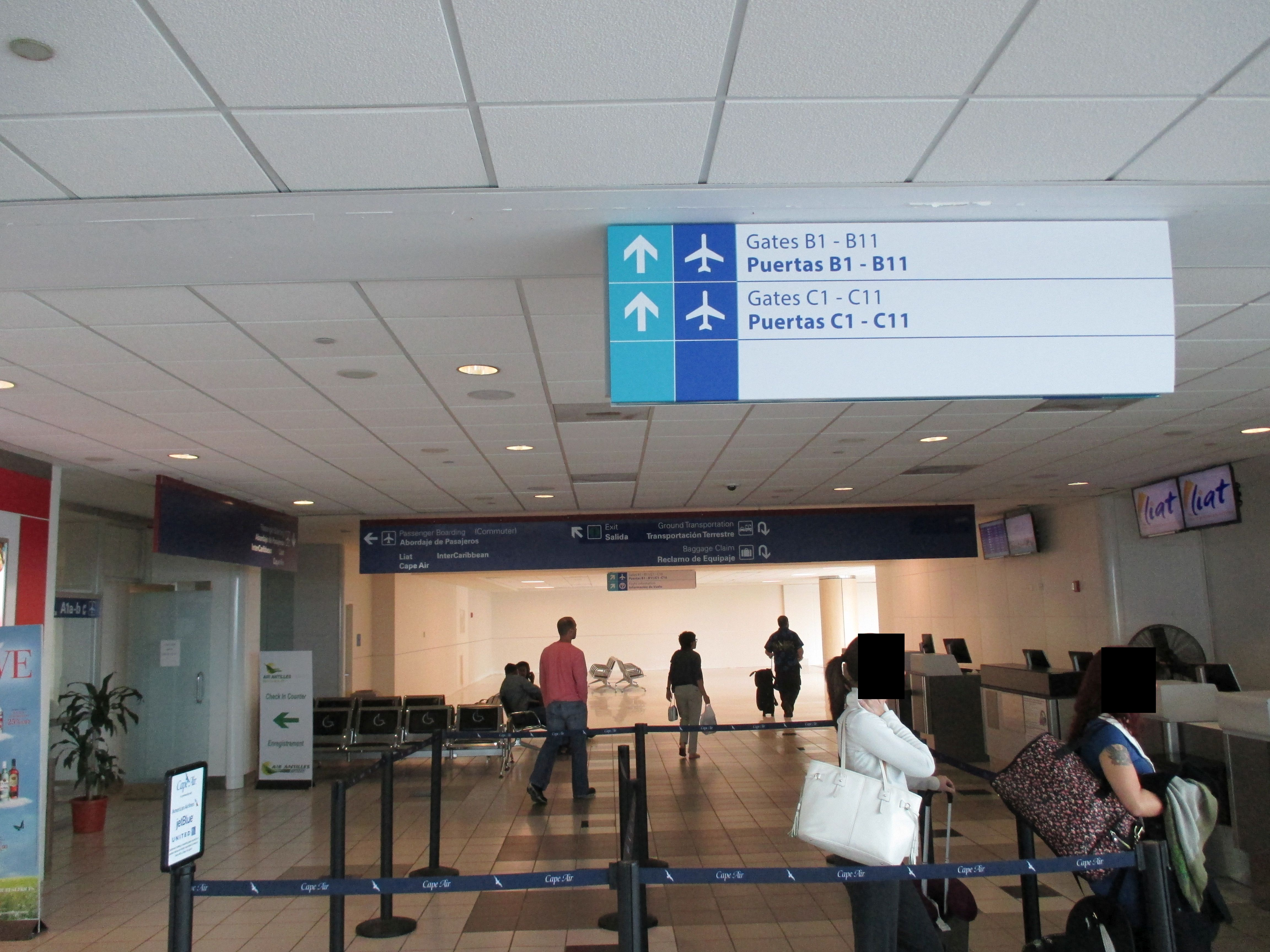
Cape Air check in counters

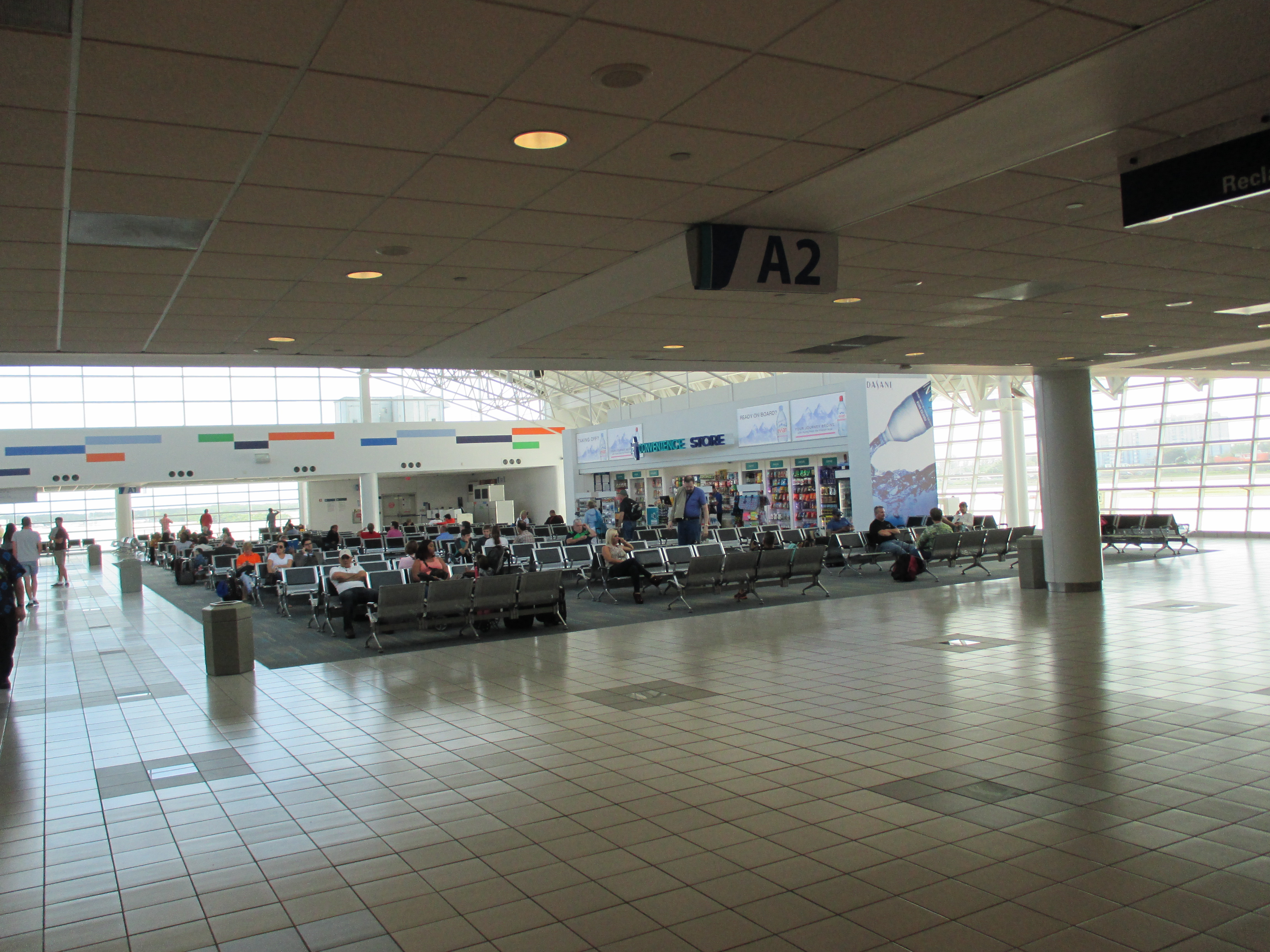
Waiting area at Gate A2

From 1990 to 2000, several infrastructure works were carried out with an investment of approximately $128 million. Some of these include the expansion of the two-level access road to a maximum of 10 lanes on both levels and the new air traffic control tower (designed by Segundo Cardona FAIA of SCF Architects).

Competition from low-cost carriers, together with the financial crisis and oil price shock of 2008, led American to reduce its San Juan presence and consolidate its Caribbean hub operations at Miami. American eventually closed its San Juan base and retired its ATR fleet in 2013 as part of its Chapter 11 restructuring. That same year, the airport received major upgrades, including the new Terminal A, new pavement and expansions, new light systems, press conference rooms, consolidated security area for Terminals B, C and D as well as new fast food restaurants along its corridors. In 2012, the new Terminal A was opened, which is currently occupied by JetBlue Airways.

The Airport is owned by the Ports Authority but since 2013 it is managed by Aerostar Airport Holdings, in a private public initiative through which a contract was granted to that company to operate the airport for 40 years. This was after observations were made by politicians in and outside of Puerto Rico, and comments were made that privatization was a better solution for the airport. Prior to privatization, management was changed each time a different political party in Puerto Rico took office and this caused disruption, and a lack of a long-term vision for the airport.

In January 2024, Frontier Airlines announced the establishment of a crew base in San Juan

In the past, the airport has been served by many airlines including Surinam Airways.

== Operations ==
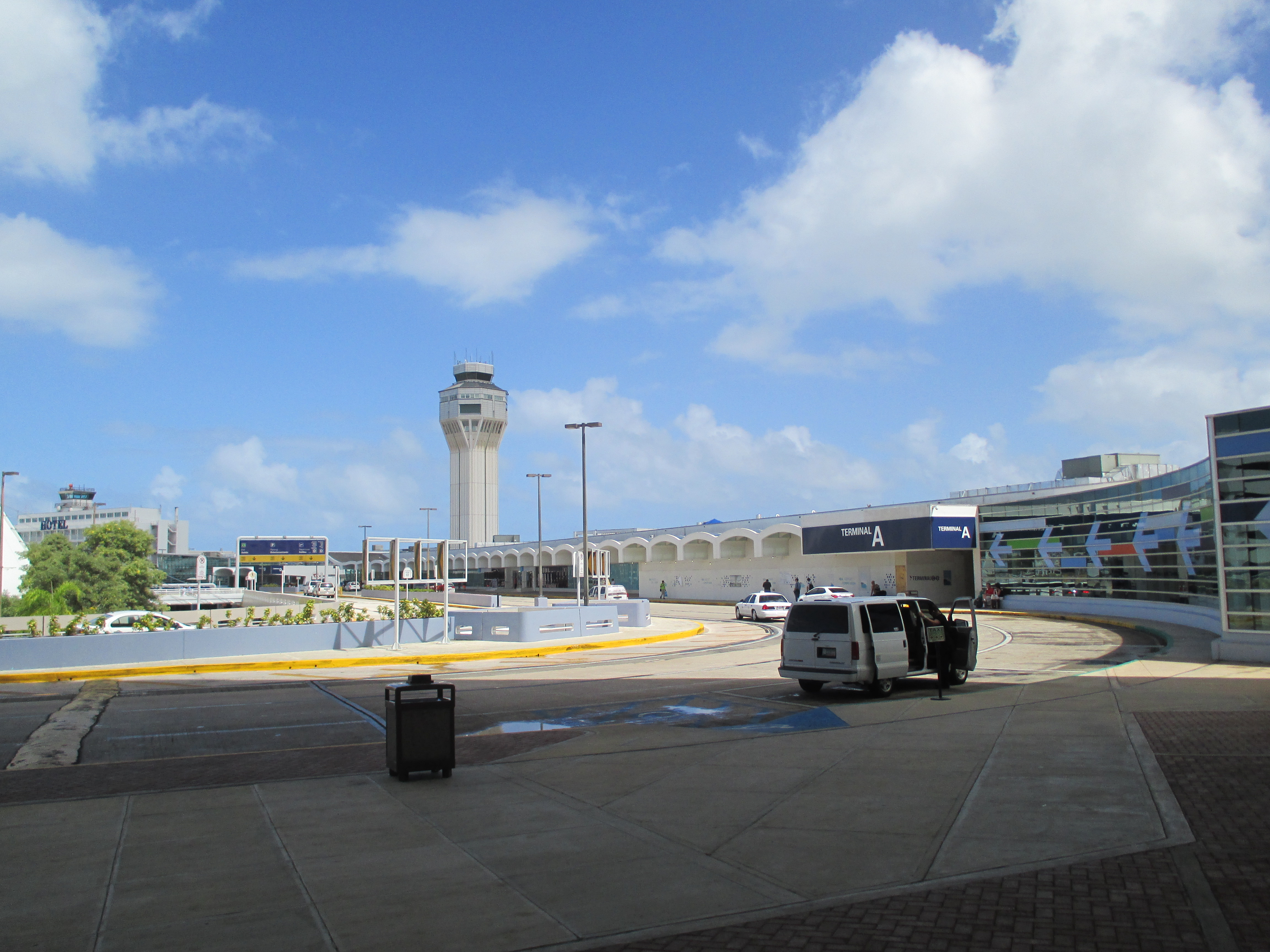
Arrivals and departures area

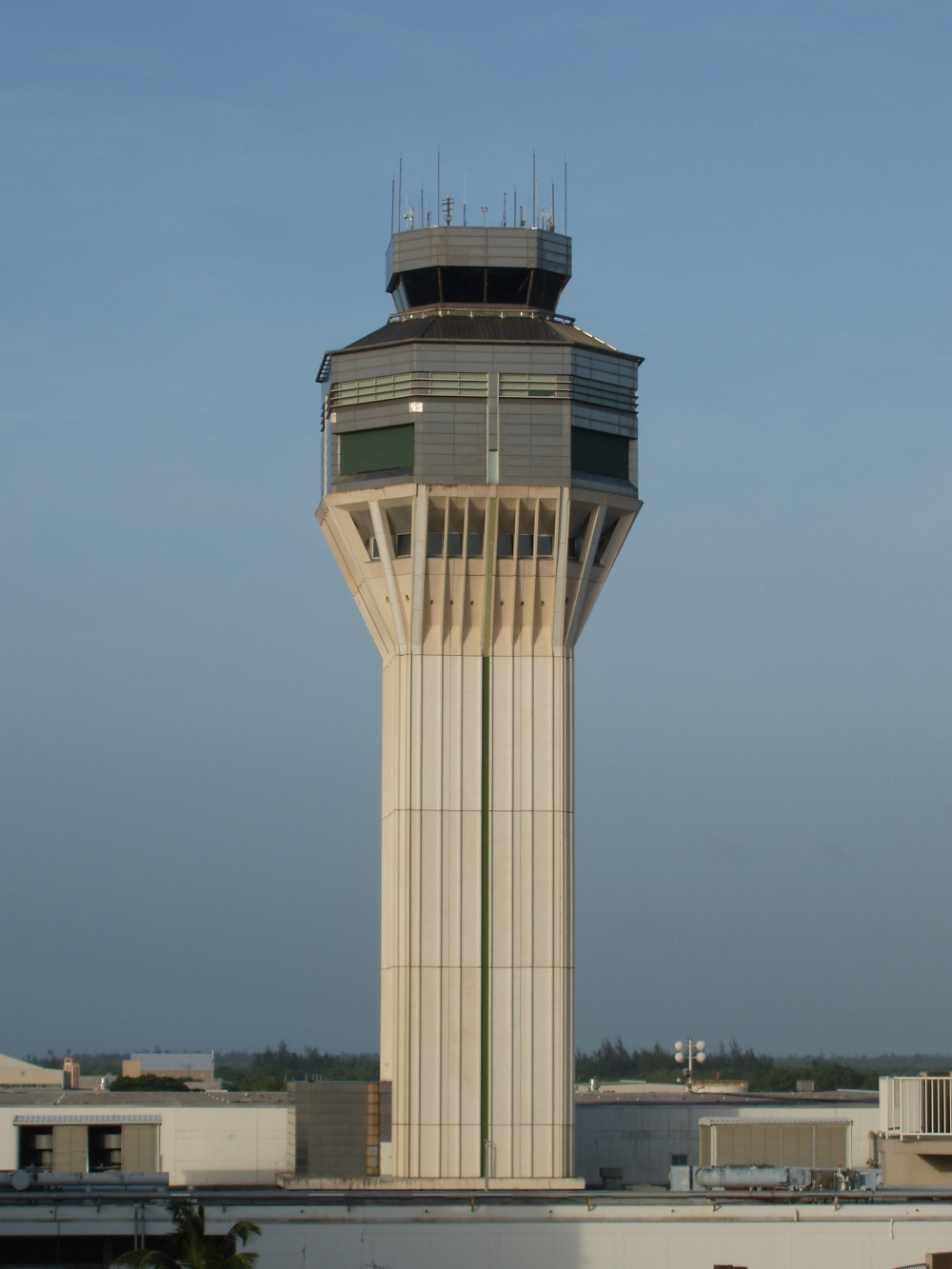
SJU's Control Tower designed by Segundo Cardona FAIA (SCF Architects)

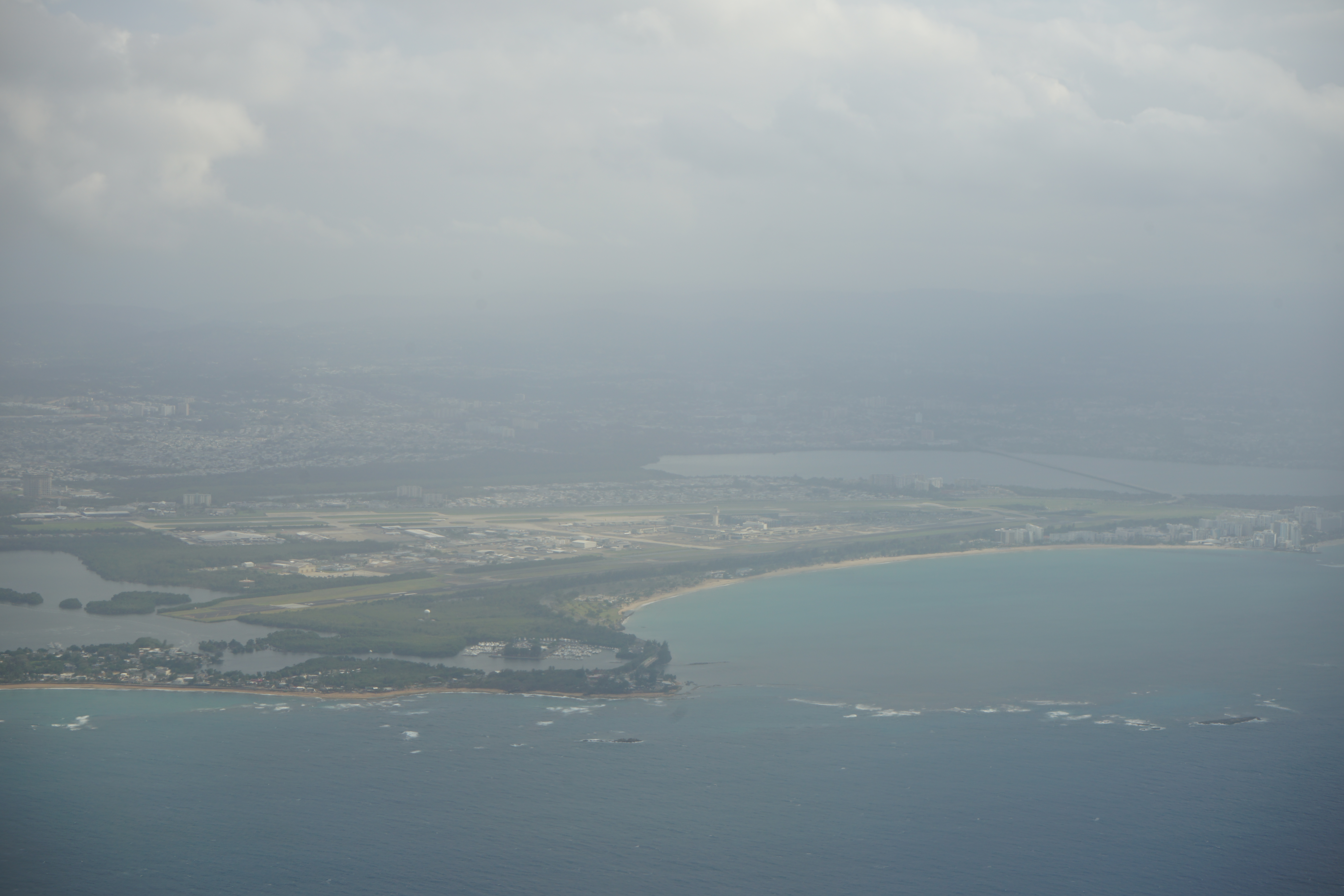
An aerial photo of SJU taken on departure

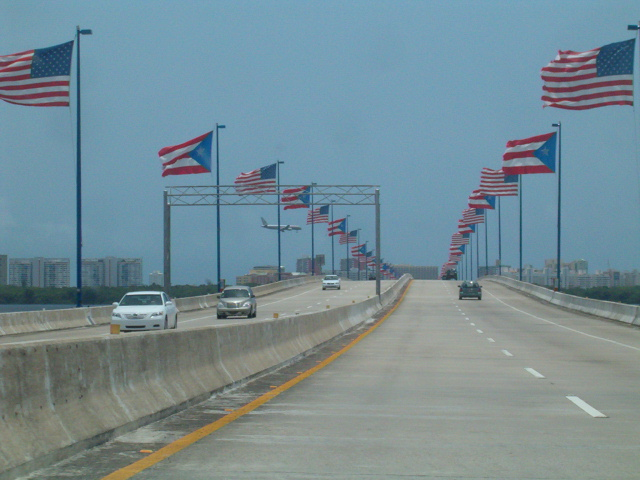
Teodoro Moscoso Bridge connecting the city of San Juan to the Luis Munoz Marin International Airport in Carolina

Luis Muñoz Marín International Airport is Puerto Rico's main international gateway and its main connection to the mainland United States. Domestic flights fly between Carolina and other local destinations, including Culebra, Mayagüez and Vieques. The airport is accessed from the San Juan district of Hato Rey, the island's financial district, via the Teodoro Moscoso Bridge. Old San Juan is accessed via the Baldorioty de Castro Expressway (PR-26). The airport serves as the Caribbean hub for Cape Air and Air Sunshine, a Focus City for JetBlue and an operating base for Frontier Airlines (as of June 2024). JetBlue is the largest carrier in San Juan, with 51 daily flights on an average day.

== Terminals ==
As of August 2020, Luis Muñoz Marín Airport has one main terminal building with four concourses and a separate terminal with one concourse. However, all terminals are connected. Over the years, the airport has switched between letter designations and number designations. In the late 2010s, the airport incorporated both letter and numbers. The letters are used for the concourses and the numbers used for the airlines' departure areas in Terminals B, C and D, Terminal A having its own ticketing area.

=== Terminal A ===
Terminal A was opened in June 2012 and occupied solely by JetBlue Airways, announcing San Juan as a focus city. The terminal originally had seven gates but an additional gate was added for regional airlines during the renovations of Terminals B and C. All JetBlue flights, both domestic and international, depart from Terminal A and as of June 2025, Terminal A is used by Air Canada, Avelo, JetBlue and Tradewind Aviation. As of 2025, plans to relocate the check-in desks and security lines are underway. Gates A1, A2 and A3 will also be relocated once the new terminal extension has been built.

Terminal A also houses The Lounge San Juan, a VIP airport lounge belonging to Priority Pass as well as Gates A1 through A8.

=== Terminal B (Concourse) ===
This $40 million dollar and 365,000-square-foot (33,900 m^{2}), fully self contained facility opened in 1985 and was designed as a sole terminal for Eastern Airlines accommodating 11 wide body gates.

With Eastern Airlines’ demise, the single carrier 11 gate unit terminal originally designed for Eastern Airlines was altered and expanded in three phases to become a state of the art 25 gate facility servicing over 30 domestic and international airlines and a multitude of concessionaires. The expansion of the existing Terminal B, which resulted in a new concourse, then became known as Terminal C.

When Terminal B was closed for renovations, airlines were temporarily moved to Terminals A, C and D. Terminal B reopened after a $130 million renovation in December 2014, with Delta, United, Southwest, and Spirit as its first tenants (with all operations moved in February 2015).

As of June 2025, Terminal B is also used by Air Canada. All check-in counters for airlines using gates in Terminals B, C and D are all located within the Terminal and Gates B2 through B10 are located within the Concourse.

=== Terminal C (Concourse) ===
Terminal C was originally built and completed in 1996 as an expansion to Terminal B in an effort to accommodate the growth of American Airlines’ Caribbean Hub.

Terminal C reopened from its $55 million renovation in March 2016. The letter designation for Terminal C was temporarily discontinued, and the concourse was instead added as an extension to Terminal B. The Terminal B extension was later changed back to Terminal C.

Both Terminals B and C feature high-end retail stores and new restaurants, improved seating as well as automated baggage scanners currently used only by six other airports in the mainland U.S.

An Avianca VIP airport lounge is located at the entrance of Terminal C. This All-Inclusive lounge is operated by Global Lounge Network.

As of June 2025, Terminal C houses gates C2 through C10 and is used primarily by Frontier. Other airlines in the terminal also include Air Canada, American, Arajet, Avianca, Copa, Iberia, international JetBlue arrivals as well as local charters.

=== Terminal D (Concourse) ===
The current Terminal D occupies what were formerly known as Terminals D and E and they were previously occupied solely by American Airlines, its regional affiliate, Executive Airlines, which operated flights under the American Eagle brand, and later both British Airways and Iberia. American Airlines' Admirals Lounge continued to operate until March 22, 2014. The former Terminal E area became unused after American Airlines moved their operations to Terminal C in 2015. The American Eagle flights were moved to the previous Terminal D in the late 2000s before being discontinued in April 2013.

Terminal D reopened on March 14, 2023, and is mostly used for small and regional aircraft operators such as Cape Air, Caribbean Airlines, and InterCaribbean Airways as well as other carriers. The terminal has five gates set up for regional flights and another three gates set up for high-capacity scheduled and charter flights. These scheduled flights include Delta, Frontier, Spirit and United when Terminals B and C are at maximum capacity. The former eastern end of Terminal D has been walled off, and the former Terminal E remains closed off to the public, both still waiting for renovations. The closed terminal areas and baggage claim area still have old American Airlines branding from their hub operations while the former check-in hall has been renovated for access to the airport hotel and parking.

The new terminal has a more open ambience which will be used as a basis for future renovations at Terminals A, B and C. The cost of renovations is estimated to be at around $14 million.

== Airlines and destinations ==
=== Passenger ===
Airlines	Destinations	Refs
Aeroméxico	Mexico City–Benito Juárez (begins June 24, 2027)	
Air Canada Rouge	Seasonal: Montréal–Trudeau, Toronto–Pearson	
Air Transat	Seasonal: Montréal–Trudeau	
American Airlines	Charlotte, Chicago–O'Hare, Dallas/Fort Worth, Miami, Philadelphia	
Arajet	Punta Cana, Santo Domingo–Las Américas	
Avelo Airlines	Charlotte/Concord, Lakeland, New Haven, Wilmington (DE)	
Avianca	Bogotá, Medellín–JMC	
Cape Air	Culebra, Mayagüez, St. Croix, St. Thomas, Tortola, Vieques; Seasonal: Virgin Gorda	
Contour Airlines	Dominica–Douglas-Charles, St. Maarten	
Copa Airlines	Panama City–Tocumen	
Delta Air Lines	Atlanta, Boston, Detroit, Minneapolis/St. Paul, New York–JFK; Seasonal: Raleigh/Durham	
Fly The Whale	St. Croix	
Frontier Airlines	Atlanta, Baltimore, Boston, Charlotte, Fort Lauderdale, Hartford, Houston–Intercontinental (begins December 17, 2026), Jacksonville (FL), Miami, Newark, Orlando, Philadelphia, Punta Cana, Raleigh/Durham, Santo Domingo–Las Américas, Tampa, Washington–Dulles; Seasonal: Cleveland (resumes December 17, 2026), New York–LaGuardia	
Iberia	Madrid	
InterCaribbean Airways	St. Kitts, Tortola	
JetBlue	Baltimore, Boston, Buffalo, Fort Lauderdale, Hartford, Jacksonville (FL), Medellín–JMC, New York–JFK, Newark, Norfolk, Orlando, Philadelphia, Punta Cana, Raleigh/Durham, Richmond, St. Croix, St. Thomas, Santiago de los Caballeros, Santo Domingo–Las Américas, Tampa, Washington–National, White Plains; Seasonal: Providence	
Southwest Airlines	Baltimore, Chicago–Midway, Fort Lauderdale, Houston–Hobby, Nashville, Orlando, St. Louis, Tampa; Seasonal: Austin, Columbus–Glenn (begins February 13, 2027), Indianapolis, Kansas City (begins June 5, 2027)	
Sun Country Airlines	Minneapolis/St. Paul	
Tradewind Aviation	St. Barthélemy; Seasonal: Anguilla, Tortola, Virgin Gorda	
United Airlines	Chicago–O'Hare, Denver, Houston–Intercontinental, Newark, Washington–Dulles	
WestJet	Seasonal: Toronto–Pearson	

=== Cargo ===
Airlines	Destinations
Amazon Air	Richmond, Tampa
Amerijet International	Brussels, Newark, Orlando
Atlas Air	Cincinnati, Medellín–JMC, Miami
DHL Aero Expreso	Panama City–Tocumen
FedEx Express	Miami
UPS Airlines	Louisville

Intra-Puerto Rico destinations map
Intra-Puerto Rico destinations from Luis Muñoz Marín International Airport.

• Red represents year-round destinations.
• Green represents seasonal destinations.
• Orange represents direct destinations with stops.
• Blue represents future destinations.

• Pink represents destinations being terminated.

Caribbean and Central American destinations map
Caribbean and Central American destinations from Luis Muñoz Marín International Airport.

• Red represents year-round destinations.
• Green represents seasonal destinations.
• Orange represents direct destinations with stops.
• Blue represents future destinations.

• Pink represents destinations being terminated.

North American destinations map
North American destinations from Luis Muñoz Marín International Airport.

• Red represents year-round destinations.
• Green represents seasonal destinations.
• Orange represents direct destinations with stops.
• Blue represents future destinations.

• Pink represents destinations being terminated.

Other International destinations map
Other International destinations from Luis Muñoz Marín International Airport.

• Red represents year-round destinations.
• Green represents seasonal destinations.
• Orange represents direct destinations with stops.
• Blue represents future destinations.

• Pink represents destinations being terminated.

== Statistics ==
=== Traffic statistics ===
Total Passengers
Year	Passengers	% Change	Year	Passengers	% Change	Year	Passengers	% Change
2001	9,453,564	–	2011	7,993,381	▼5.9%	2021	9,684,227	▲99.9%
2002	9,389,232	▼0.7%	2012	8,448,172	▲5.7%	2022	10,310,990	▲6.5%
2003	9,716,687	▲3.5%	2013	8,347,119	▼1.2%	2023	12,197,553	▲18.3%
2004	10,568,986	▲8.8%	2014	8,569,622	▲2.7%	2024	13,247,382	▲8.6%
2005	10,768,698	▲1.9%	2015	8,733,161	▲1.9%	2025	13,643,686	▲3.0%
2006	10,506,118	▼2.4%	2016	9,032,627	▲3.4%	2026	11,129,777	▼2.4%
2007	10,409,464	▼0.9%	2017	8,407,404	▼6.9%			
2008	9,378,924	▼9.9%	2018	8,373,679	▼0.4%			
2009	8,245,895	▼12.1%	2019	9,448,253	▲12.8%			
2010	8,491,257	▲3.0%	2020	4,845,353	▼48.7%			

Carrier Shares (January 2025 - December 2025)
Rank	Airline	Passengers	Share
1	JetBlue	3,252,000	27.87%
2	Frontier Airlines	1,888,000	16.18%
3	American Airlines	1,497,000	12.83%
4	Delta Air Lines	1,269,000	10.87%
5	Southwest Airlines	1,237,000	10.60%
–	Other	2,525,000	21.64%

=== Top destinations ===
Busiest U.S. routes from SJU (January 2025 – December 2025)
Rank	City	Passengers	Carriers
1	Orlando, Florida	987,110	Frontier, JetBlue, Southwest, Spirit
2	New York–JFK, New York	650,200	Delta, Frontier, JetBlue
3	Miami, Florida	433,050	American, Frontier, Spirit
4	Atlanta, Georgia	378,670	Delta, Frontier, Spirit
5	Newark, New Jersey	371,260	Frontier, JetBlue, Spirit, United
6	Fort Lauderdale, Florida	344,730	Frontier, JetBlue, Southwest, Spirit
7	Boston, Massachusetts	288,990	Delta, Frontier, JetBlue, Spirit
8	Philadelphia, Pennsylvania	280,950	American, Frontier, Spirit
9	Tampa, Florida	233,930	Frontier, JetBlue, Southwest
10	Chicago–O'Hare, Illinois	215,980	American, Spirit, United

Busiest international routes from SJU (June 2024 - May 2025)
Rank	Airport	Passengers	Carriers
1	Punta Cana, Dominican Republic	308,196	Frontier, JetBlue
2	Santo Domingo–Las Américas, Dominican Republic	281,232	Frontier, JetBlue
3	Panama City–Tocumen, Panama	201,477	Copa
4	Madrid, Spain	197,902	Iberia
5	Bogotá, Colombia	135,370	Avianca
6	Medellín–JMC, Colombia	106,797	Avianca, JetBlue
7	Santiago de los Caballeros, Dominican Republic	74,395	Frontier, JetBlue, Silver
8	Tortola, British Virgin Islands	67,835	Cape Air, Caribbean, Silver, Tradewind
9	St. Jean, Saint Barthélemy	39,154	Tradewind
10	Port of Spain, Trinidad & Tobago	25,358	Caribbean, Frontier

== Military ==
- United States Armed Forces
  - United States Air Force
    - Air National Guard
      - Puerto Rico Air National Guard
        - Muñiz ANGB
          - 156th Wing

Located within Luis Muñoz Marín International Airport, the 156th Airlift Wing is used for air mobility missions, providing global transport to military personnel, equipment, and supplies in both wartime and peacetime training exercises, particularly for those under the purview of the United States Southern Command, which covers the land mass of Latin America south of Mexico, including Central and South America, and the Caribbean, and the waters adjacent to these areas in the Atlantic and Pacific Oceans, and the Caribbean Sea.

== Accidents and incidents ==
- On March 5, 1969, Prinair Flight 277, a de Havilland Heron from St. Thomas, United States Virgin Islands, was attempting to land at the airport when it crashed into mountainous terrain near Luquillo, killing all 19 on board. An NTSB investigation found that an air traffic controller at the airport mistakenly thought the aircraft was near San Juan when it actually was near Fajardo instead.
- On December 31, 1972, baseball star Roberto Clemente and his companions died when their DC-7 crashed soon after takeoff from Isla Verde during a relief flight bound for Nicaragua. Neither the bodies of the victims (except for the pilot's) nor the plane's wreckage was ever found.
- On September 26, 1978, an Air Caribbean Airlines Beechcraft D185 passenger airplane was landing from Rafael Hernandez Airport in Aguadilla, after a domestic flight, when it crashed into Barrio Obrero, near Residencial Las Casas, killing all 6 on board. The plane fell on top of a bar, injuring several bar clients, including mechanic Luciano Rivera. Wake turbulence from an Eastern Airlines L-1011 which was also landing was found to be the accident's main cause.
- On July 22, 1986, a Borinquen Air Douglas C-53D registered N27PR crashed into a lagoon on approach. The aircraft was on a cargo flight to Golden Rock Airport, Saint Kitts and Nevis, when the starboard engine failed shortly after take-off and the crew decided to return to Carolina. One of the two crew members was killed, the other was seriously injured.
- On March 1, 1989, a Borinquen Air Douglas C-49J registered N28PR ditched on approach following a failure of the port engine. Although the landing gear was retracted, the crew did not feather the propeller. This resulted in increased drag which made flight impossible. There were no fatalities. The aircraft was on an international cargo flight from Golden Rock Airport, Saint Kitts and Nevis.
- On September 17, 1989, a Tol Air Services Douglas C-47A registered N100DW was damaged beyond economic repair by Hurricane Hugo.
- On September 24, 1998, a Trans-Florida Airlines Convair 240-13 registered N91237 had an engine problem on take-off. It attempted to return to the airport, but lost altitude and was forced to land in a lagoon. Though the aircraft was damaged beyond economical repair and written off, the two crew and one passenger were uninjured.
- On May 9, 2004, an American Eagle ATR 72 operating Flight 5401 crashed in San Juan, Puerto Rico after the captain lost control of the aircraft while landing. Twenty people were injured, but there were no fatalities.
- On March 15, 2012, a Jet One Express cargo Convair 440 operating a flight to St. Maarten crashed near the airport, killing its two occupants. The plane went down in a lagoon after the pilot reported engine trouble.
- On December 2, 2013, an IBC Airways Swearingen SA227-AC Metro III registered N831BC crashed into terrain near La Alianza, Arecibo, Puerto Rico. The aircraft was on a cargo flight from Santo Domingo, Dominican Republic, when the crew lost control of the aircraft for reasons that could not be determined. Both crew members were killed.
- On June 3, 2017, a fatal crash happened at nearby Piñones Beach when an Air America Airlines airplane, on its way from San Juan to Culebra, tried to perform an emergency landing at the airport, going into the beach's waters instead. A 15-year-old female died, while a 14-year-old female, a 45-year-old male passenger and the aircraft's male pilot were rescued injured but alive.

== In popular culture ==
- Various scenes of the 1976 La Pandilla teen comedy musical La Pandilla en Apuros were filmed at the airport.
- The events of the 2021 film El Cuartito happen at an immigration room in the airport.

== See also ==
- Mercedita International Airport
- Rafael Hernandez Airport
- Transportation in Puerto Rico
- List of airports in Puerto Rico
- List of the busiest airports in Puerto Rico
- List of the busiest airports in the Caribbean
