= Clayton J. Lloyd International Airport =

International airport in Anguilla

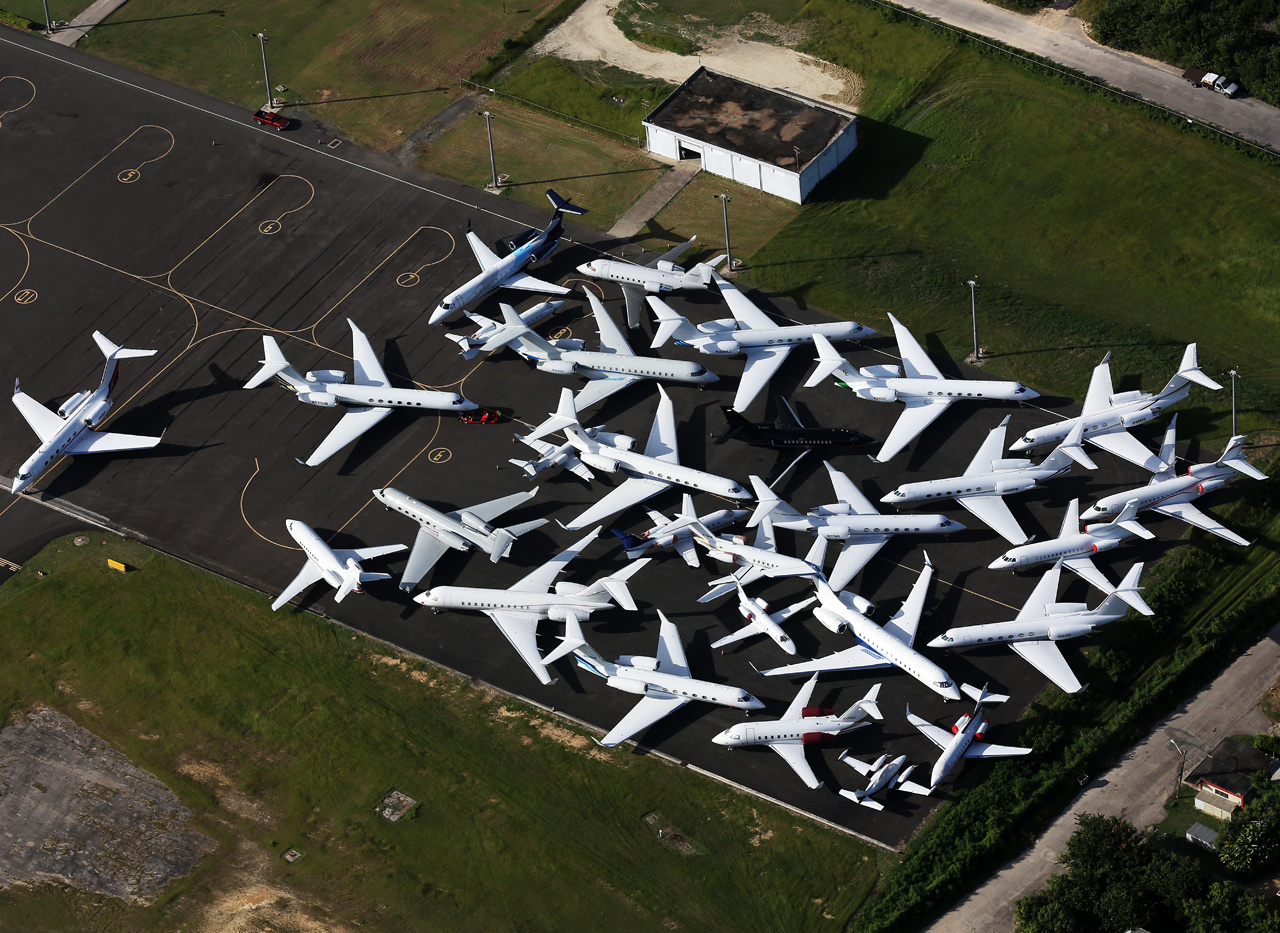
- IATA: AXA; ICAO: TQPF

Summary
- Airport type: Public
- Operator: Government
- Serves: The Valley (capital)
- Location: The Valley, Anguilla
- Elevation AMSL: 127 ft (39 m)
- Coordinates: 18°12′17″N 063°03′18″W

Map
- Location in Anguilla AXA (the Caribbean)

Runways
Direction	Length		Surface
Direction	m	ft	Surface
10/28	1,665	5,463	Asphalt
- Source: DAFIF

Clayton J. Lloyd International Airport (IATA: AXA, ICAO: TQPF) (formerly known as the Anguilla Wallblake Airport) is a small international airport located on the island of Anguilla, a British Overseas Territory in the Caribbean. It is located very close to The Valley, the island's capital. Wallblake Airport is also a featured airport in one of the demos for Microsoft Flight Simulator X. It has a small terminal with no jetways and is the only airport in Anguilla.

The airport became known as the "Clayton J. Lloyd International Airport" on 4 July 2010. Its namesake was the first Anguillan aviator, who founded the first Anguillan air service, Air Anguilla, which was later renamed Valley Air Service. The airport houses the Anguilla Outstation of the Eastern Caribbean Civil Aviation Authority.

== Airlines and destinations ==
=== Passenger ===
Airlines	Destinations
American Eagle	Miami
Anguilla Air Services	Antigua, St. Barthelemy, St. Kitts, St. Maarten
BermudAir	Seasonal: Baltimore, Boston, Newark, Providenciales (begins 19 December 2026), St. Petersburg/Clearwater (begins 24 December 2026), Toronto–Pearson (begins 19 December 2026)
Cape Air	St. Thomas
Sky High	Santo Domingo–Las Americas
Tradewind Aviation	San Juan
Trans Anguilla Airways	Antigua, Dominica–Douglas-Charles, Nevis, St. Barthelemy, St. Eustatius, St. Kitts, St. Maarten, Tortola

=== New jet service ===
American Airlines initiated new, twice-weekly nonstop jet service between its Miami (MIA) hub and Anguilla on 11 December 2021, operated by Envoy Air, as its American Eagle affiliate with Embraer 175 regional jets.

BermudAir launched a new nonstop seasonal service twice weekly between Boston (BOS), Newark (EWR), and Baltimore (BWI) on December 17, 18 and, 19, 2025. The operation is carried out by AnguillAir, using Embraer 190 regional jets.

== Notable flights ==
In recent history, a Boeing 737-300 jetliner landed at the airport as well as an McDonnell Douglas MD-83 jetliner carrying the FIFA World Cup Trophy Tour.

On January 4, 2023, an Airbus A320neo from Avianca El Salvador landed for the first time in Anguilla.

On August 16, 2023, a Royal Air Force Airbus Airbus A400M Atlas landed in Anguilla for the first time ever.

On May 31, 2025, a Royal Air Force Boeing Boeing C-17 Globemaster III landed in Anguilla for a training exercise across the Caribbean.

On December 17, 2025, an Airbus A319neo landed in Anguilla for the first time as a charter flight.
