= Robert L. Bradshaw International Airport =

Robert L. Bradshaw Airport
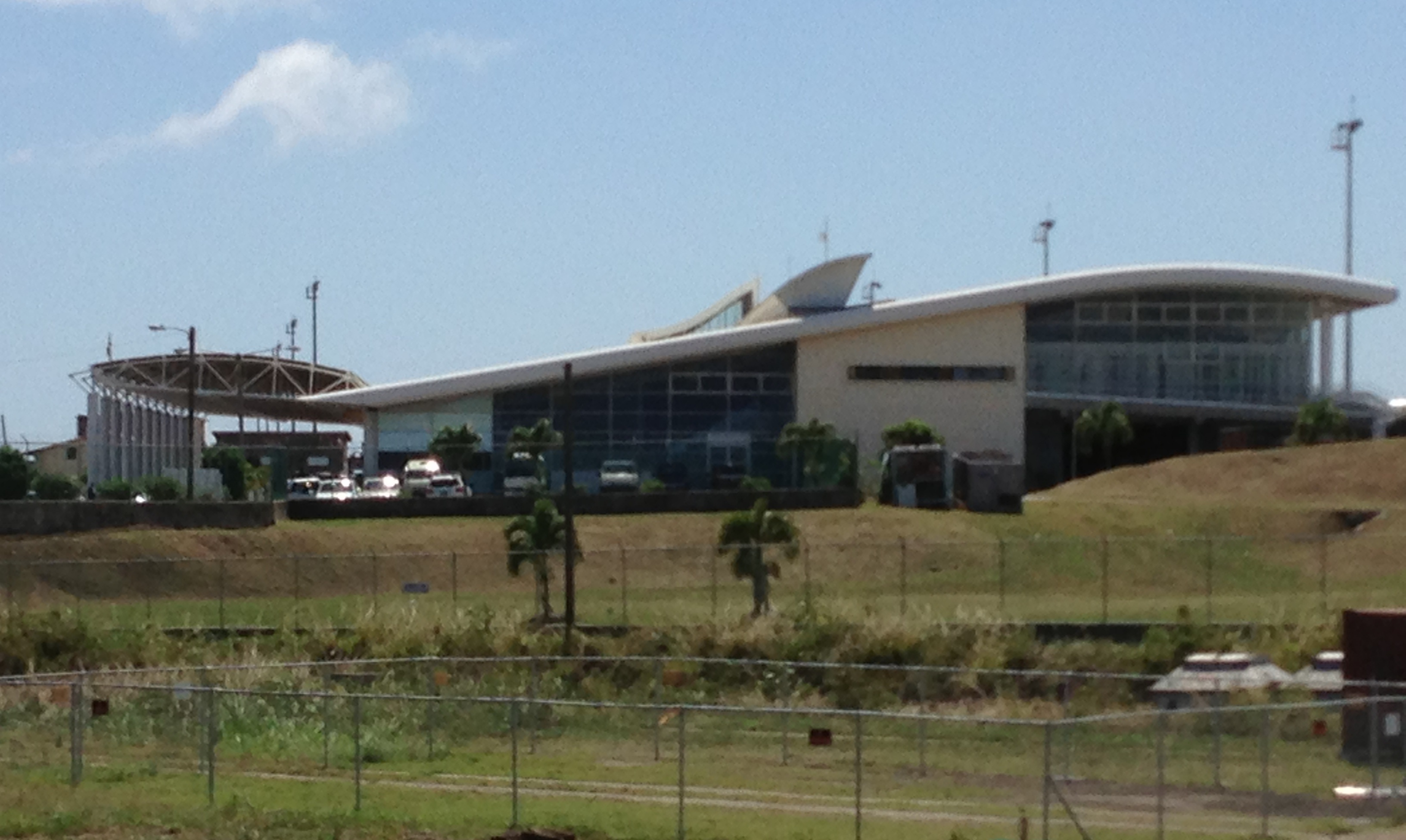
- IATA: SKB; ICAO: TKPK

Summary
- Airport type: Public
- Operator: St Christopher Air & Sea Ports Authority
- Location: Basseterre, Saint Kitts
- Elevation AMSL: 170 ft (52 m)
- Coordinates: 17°18′41″N 062°43′07″W

Map
- Location on map of Saint Kitts and Nevis

Runways
Direction	Length		Surface
Direction	m	ft	Surface
07/25	2,439	8,000	Asphalt

Robert L. Bradshaw Airport (IATA: SKB, ICAO: TKPK), formerly known as Golden Rock Airport, is an international airport located just northeast of Basseterre, on the island of Saint Kitts, serving the nation of Saint Kitts and Nevis. It was named after the first Premier of St. Kitts-Nevis-Anguilla (as it then was), Robert Llewellyn Bradshaw. In 2008, the airport handled 399,706 passengers.

== Overview ==
Built in the 1940’s, a major renovation was completed in December 2006. The US$17 million project financed by loans from the St Kitts-Nevis-Anguilla National Bank and Taiwan, includes expansion of the parking apron to accommodate six wide-bodied aircraft at the same time, complete resurfacing of the 2,439 m (8,002 ft) runway and construction of a new taxiway. Construction started late 2004. Up to 6 wide-bodied jets can now be accommodated on the tarmac. The airport can accommodate commercial jumbo jets and handles scheduled non-stop jet flights to Canada and the United States, as well as numerous regional commuter flights from within the Caribbean area.

The airport also provides facilities for cargo and private jets. The largest aircraft ever to land here was a Boeing 747-400. A chartered SriLankan Airlines Airbus A340-300 made aviation history when they operated a charter flight to St Kitts in 2011, a nearly 10,000-mile journey from Colombo-BIA, Sri Lanka.

In 2013, through a joint venture between Taiwan and St. Kitts, where Taiwan donated $1 million for the project, a 1MW solar farm was constructed on the airport premises. The solar panels display the text: "Welcome to SKB".

== Airlines and destinations ==
=== Passenger ===
Airlines	Destinations
Air Canada Rouge	Seasonal: Toronto–Pearson
American Airlines	Miami; Seasonal: Charlotte, New York–JFK
British Airways	London–Gatwick
Cape Air	Nevis, St. Thomas
Delta Air Lines	Seasonal: Atlanta, New York–JFK
InterCaribbean Airways	Barbados, San Juan
JetBlue	New York–JFK
Sky High	Santo Domingo–Las Americas
Sunrise Airways	Antigua, Sint Maarten
Trans Anguilla Airways	Anguilla
United Airlines	Seasonal: Newark
Winair	Antigua, Barbados, Dominica–Douglas-Charles, Sint Maarten, Tortola

=== Cargo ===
Airlines	Destinations
Air Cargo Carriers	Dominica–Douglas-Charles
Amerijet International	Miami
FedEx Express	San Juan

== Other facilities ==
The airport houses the St. Kitts Outstation of the Eastern Caribbean Civil Aviation Authority.

== Accidents and incidents ==
- On 26 September 2009, British Airways Flight 2156 to V. C. Bird International Airport, Antigua, operated by Boeing 777-236 G-VIIR entered the runway through the wrong taxiway, prior to takeoff. This resulted in the aircraft having 695m less available for takeoff, compared to the correct taxiway entry. The takeoff was however completed normally without incident or injuries. The AAIB report concluded the following factors contributed to the incident: "The airport authority had not installed any taxiway or holding point signs on the airfield. The crew did not brief the taxi routing. The crew misidentified Taxiway Bravo for Taxiway Alpha and departed from Intersection Bravo. The trainee ATCO did not inform the flight crew that they were at Intersection Bravo."
