= Beef Island =

Island in the British Virgin Islands

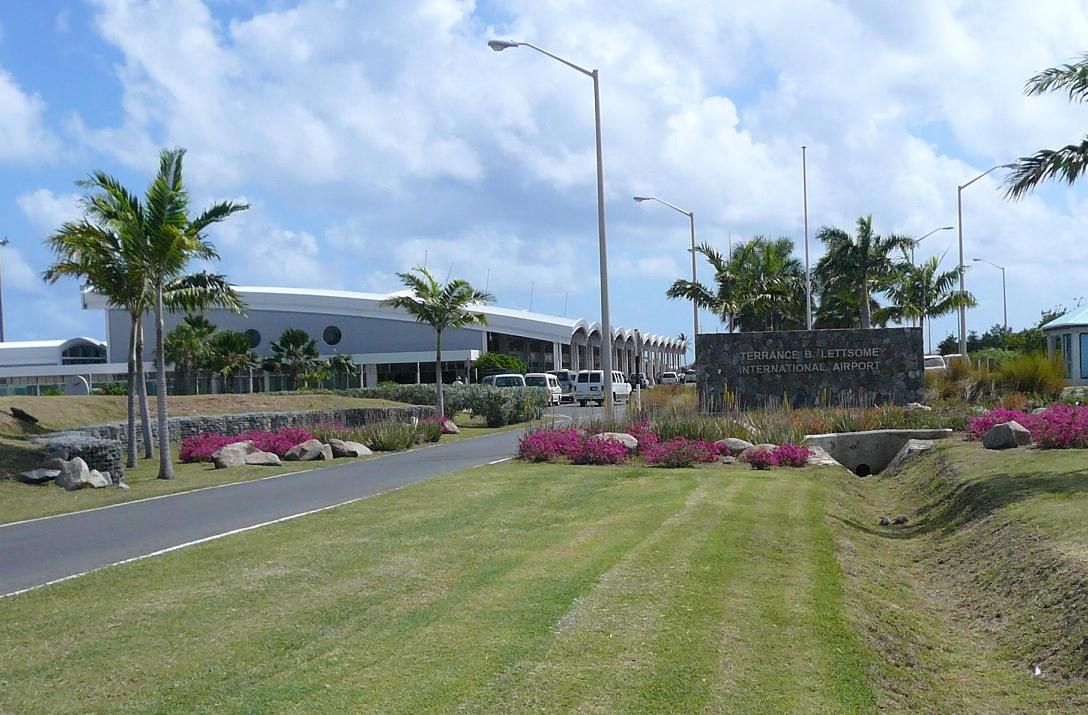
- Terrance B. Lettsome International Airport

- The location of Beef Island within the British Virgin Islands

- Location within British Virgin Islands Location within the Caribbean

Geography
- Location: Caribbean Sea
- Coordinates: 18°27′N 64°32′W
- Archipelago: Virgin Islands

Administration
- United Kingdom; British Virgin Islands
- British Overseas Territory: British Virgin Islands

Additional information
- Time zone: AST (UTC-4)
- ISO code: VG

Beef Island is an island in the British Virgin Islands. It is located to the east of Tortola, and the two islands are connected by the Queen Elizabeth Bridge. Beef Island is the site of the Terrance B. Lettsome International Airport (IATA code EIS), the main commercial airport that serves Tortola and the rest of the British Virgin Islands.

Trellis Bay is a short walk east of the airport. Trellis Bay is a small town, with a market, a restaurant, a coffee shop, local craftshops and a beach. Long Bay is west of the airport.

== Development beef on Beef Island ==
In 2007, a major development on Beef Island was delayed after challenges from an environmental group called the British Virgin Islands Heritage Conservation Group. A five-star hotel with a golf course and marina was proposed for development near Hans Creek, on the south east side of the island. After a judicial review the British Virgin Islands court ordered the project suspended.

The controversy started in October 2006 when the Chief Minister of the British Virgin Islands, Dr. Orlando Smith, decided to approve the construction of a hotel on the island of Tortola, which is connected to Beef Island by the Queen Elizabeth II Bridge. Despite complaints at a public meeting held by the planning committee on January 24 2007, construction plans remained the same. Some of the local reasoning against the construction of the hotel included dangers to island habitats such as the salt pond, coral reef, and mangroves; fears of contaminating the local water supply; increased traffic; and overcrowding.

On January 31, 2007, the Chief Minister approved construction of another hotel, the Beef Island five-star development. This approval was questionable because Hans Creek is a location that the Virgin Islands Fisheries Regulations had marked as protected, making it illegal to develop anything that would harmfully affect the environment. Fearing this potentially illegal development, activist groups on the island came together to combine their resources and created VIEC, the Virgin Islands Environmental Council.

Initially VIEC led small demonstrations in which they went to the proposed construction sites, collected signatures and talked to other locals about the possible harmful effects that could result from the construction. In July VIEC collected 18,000 signatures in support of their efforts from people around the world and presented it to local government agencies.

Later in 2007 tactics shifted from protests and demonstrations to focusing on legal proceedings against the government for giving permission to build in a protected location. News articles reported that the legal fight has been inspired by the similar fight on Great Guana Cay, in the Bahamas. The legal action was funded by donations, mainly made by Sir Richard Branson, the owner of two islands in the British Virgin Islands and of Virgin Atlantic Airlines. In 2008 VIEC received additional legal and financial support from the Ocean River Institute, an organization based in the United States.

On September 23, 2009, coincidentally the international day of peace, VIEC won its lawsuit against the government in the High Court. The Judge ruled that the Beef Island development project was illegally given permission by the Prime Minister to develop at Hans Creek. It was deemed illegal because the development planned was considered harmful development and at Hans Creek, under the Fisheries Regulations, harmful development is illegal.

This victory did not last long. On August 12, 2011, the Eastern Caribbean Supreme Court of Appeal decided that the ruling made in 2009 by the High Court was invalid because Hans Creek had not been correctly made a protected area. This meant that the original planning permission given to the Beef Island Development Project was legal.
