= Terrance B. Lettsome International Airport =

Airport in British Virgin Islands

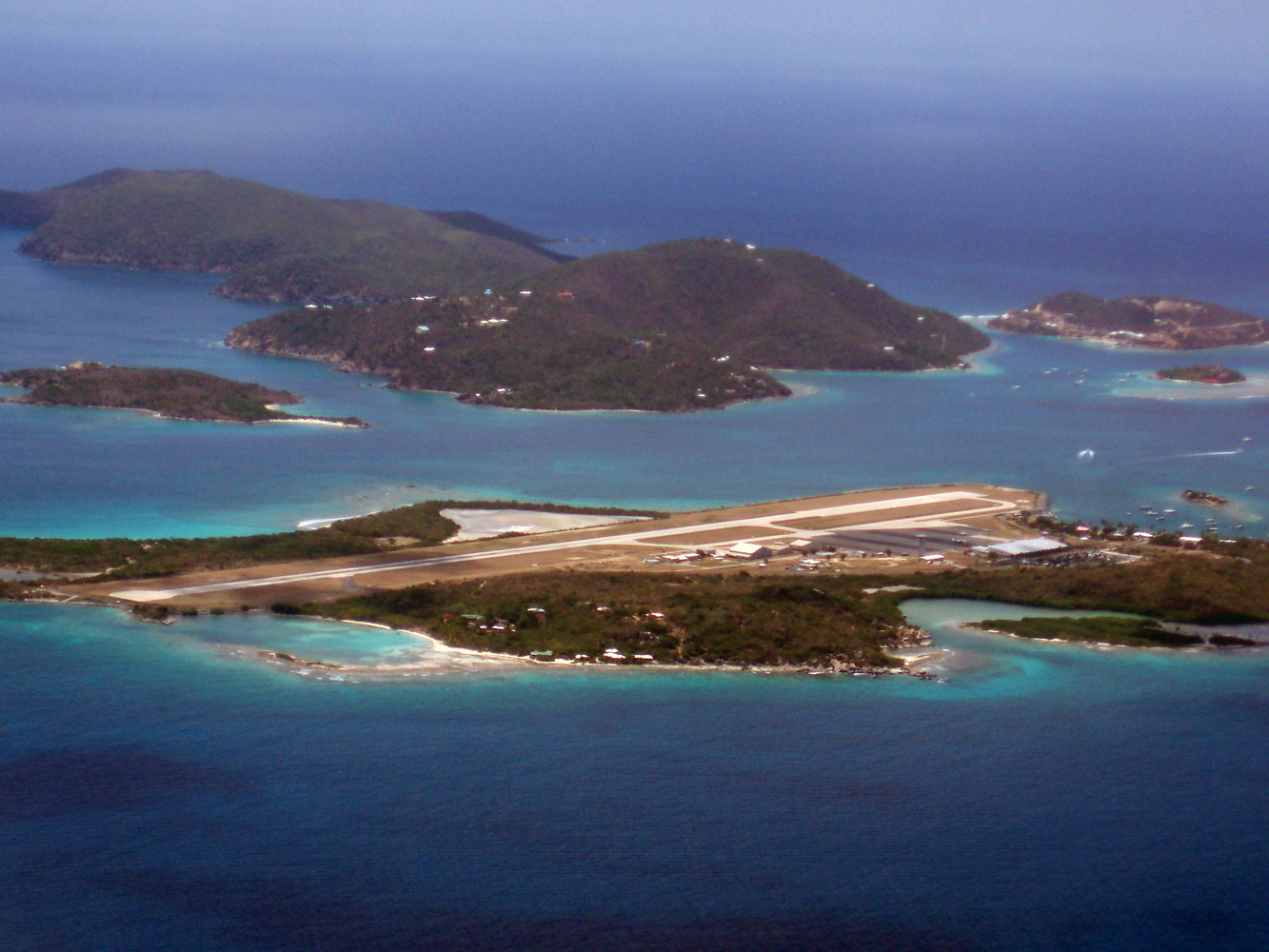
- IATA: EIS; ICAO: TUPJ

Summary
- Airport type: Public
- Operator: BVIAA
- Serves: British Virgin Islands
- Location: Beef Island
- Elevation AMSL: 16 ft (4.9 m)
- Coordinates: 18°26′44″N 064°32′35″W

Map
- Location in the British Virgin Islands

Runways
Direction	Length		Surface
Direction	m	ft	Surface
07/25	1,415	4,642	Asphalt
- Source: DAFIF

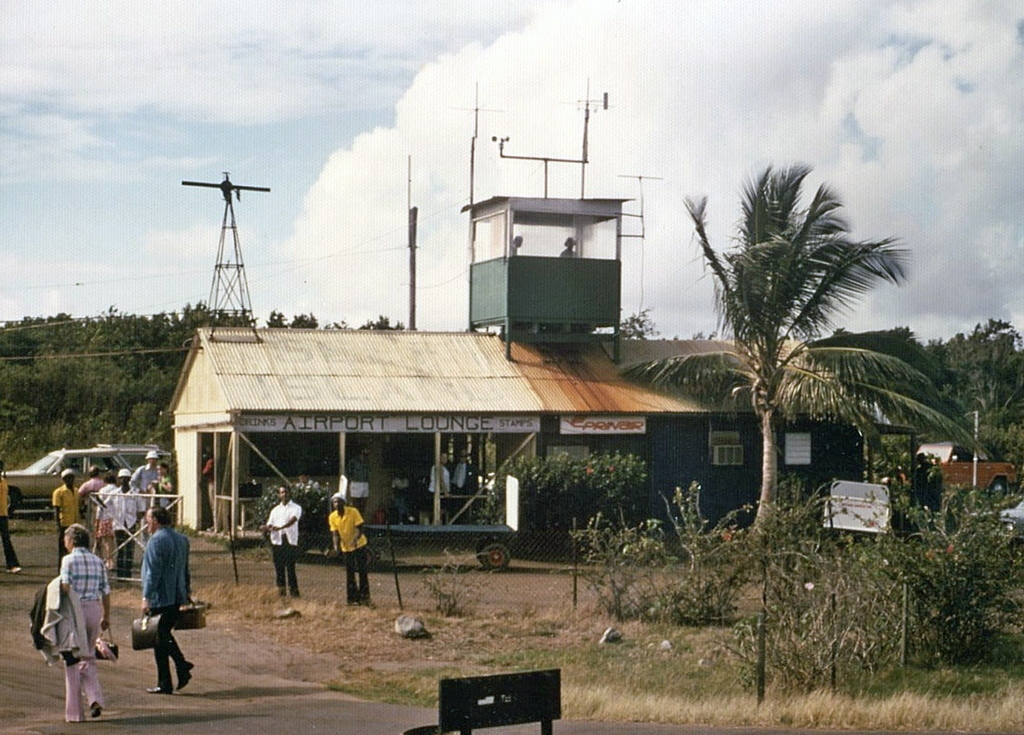
Beef Island Tortola Airport 1975

Terrance B. Lettsome International Airport (IATA: EIS, ICAO: TUPJ), previously known as Beef Island Airport, is the main airport serving the British Virgin Islands, a British overseas territory in the Caribbean. The airport serves as the gateway to just about all of the islands within the BVI. The airport is also a gateway for inter-Caribbean travelers headed to the nearby U.S. Virgin Islands. Many travellers fly into Beef Island, with the intention of taking a ferry to the other smaller British Virgin Islands. The airport is located on Beef Island, a small island off the main island of Tortola, to which it is connected by the Queen Elizabeth II Bridge.

== Overview ==
The Terrance B. Lettsome airport underwent a major $55 million renovation in 2004. After dredging was completed, the runway was expanded to allow larger planes to operate into the airfield. This renovation was the largest capital project ever undertaken in the territory at that time.

Some of the highlights of the renovation and expansion project include:

- A new 46,000 sq ft (4,300 m^{2}) terminal building
- An enlarged flight apron
- A new control tower
- 3,700 ft (1,128 m) runway extension
- New airport road with expanded parking (150 parking stalls)

There is a $20 departure tax for anyone over the age of five years.

The airport houses the BVI Outstation of the Eastern Caribbean Civil Aviation Authority.

== Expansion ==
In 2016 the Government announced an expansion of the airport to increase the runway size by 2,504 feet (763 m). This followed years of speculation and proposals; discussions about expansion and how to finance it were being undertaken in 2014. Although initial reports indicated that the United Kingdom had approved the necessary financial borrowing, later reports suggested that the UK's consent had been withheld in connection with concerns about the financial viability of the project. Under agreed financial protocols, external borrowing by the BVI Government needs to be approved by the UK Foreign and Commonwealth Office.

On 27 December 2016 the Government announced that the tender to expand the airport had been won by China Communications Construction Company. The Premier, Orlando Smith, said "Negotiations will now get underway with the preferred bidder with a view to concluding a contractual agreement within three months, which delivers the right outcome for the people of this territory." According to Government, the runway was proposed to be extended from 4,645 feet (1,416 m) to approximately 7,100 feet (2,164 m), and would thereby allow mainline jetliner types such as Boeing 737-800 and Airbus A320 aircraft to fly directly to and from the continental United States and Latin America.

However, in June 2017 the Government appeared to confirm that the proposed runway expansion would not be going forward.

In 2019, a Titan Airways-operated Airbus A318-100 jet landed at the airport, which is the largest aircraft ever operated into the airport.

== Airlines and destinations ==
=== Passenger ===
Airlines	Destinations
American Eagle	Miami
InterCaribbean Airways	Antigua, Barbados, Dominica–Douglas-Charles, San Juan, Santo Domingo–Las Americas, St. Maarten
Tradewind Aviation	Seasonal: San Juan
Winair	Barbados, Saint Kitts, Sint Maarten

Historically, in 1986 the airport had scheduled passenger jet service operated by British Caribbean Airways, with direct flights to Miami. British Caribbean operated a British Aerospace BAe 146-100 jetliner. This was only jet service operated into Tortola at that time.

==== The proposed return of jet service to Miami ====
Thirty years after the short-lived British Caribbean Airways offered jet service to Miami utilizing British Aerospace BAe 146-100 aircraft, Tortola-based BVI Airways announced the start of new nonstop Miami service using Avro RJ100 jet airliners with this aircraft being a later version of the Bae 146 jet. However the new service never flew, and BVI Airways is now presumed to be defunct having laid off all of its staff shortly before Hurricane Irma struck in 2017.

American Airlines began nonstop jet service between Tortola and Miami in June 2023 with flights operated by American Eagle Embraer 175 regional jets. The service began with a single daily seasonal flight, but has grown to several daily frequencies that operate year-round.

=== Air BVI ===
Air BVI was an airline based at the airport which operated scheduled passenger service from the early the 1970s to the mid 1990s with Britten-Norman BN-2 Islander and Douglas DC-3 prop aircraft as well as with Hawker Siddeley HS 748 turboprops during its existence. The regional air carrier served Anegada, Antigua, La Romana, Dominican Republic, St. Thomas, U.S. Virgin Islands, San Juan and Virgin Gorda besides Tortola and also operated a small hub at the airport.

== Accidents and incidents ==
- On 5 April 1971, a Vinair Douglas C-47 with registration N57372 operating an international cargo flight from San Juan, Puerto Rico crashed upon landing. The aircraft was heavily damaged and was written off.
- On 6 May 1993, a Short 330 turboprop operated by Atlantic Air BVI overran the runway and landed in the sea after aborting on takeoff. All passengers and crew survived. The airframe was damaged beyond economic repair and was sunk as a scuba diving site off Great Dog Island.

== See also ==
- Terrance B. Lettsome
