= Diego Jiménez Torres Airport =

Airport owned by the Puerto Rico Ports Authority

Diego Jiménez Torres Airport Fajardo Airport
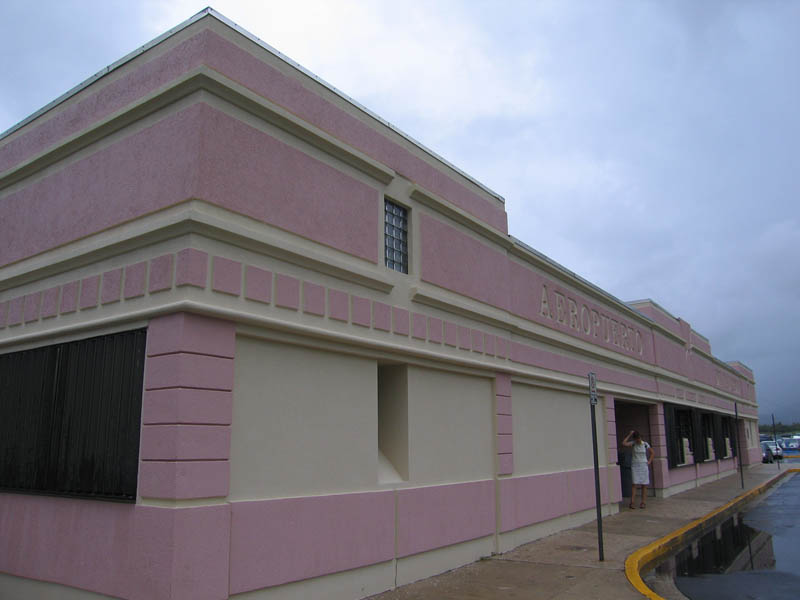
- IATA: FAJ; ICAO: TJFA; FAA LID: X95

Summary
- Airport type: Closed
- Owner: Puerto Rico Ports Authority
- Serves: Fajardo, Puerto Rico
- Closed: 2015
- Elevation AMSL: 64 ft (20 m)
- Coordinates: 18°18′29″N 65°39′43″W

Map
- Location in Puerto Rico

Runways
Direction	Length		Surface
Direction	ft	m	Surface
Closed
- Source: FAA Google Maps

Diego Jiménez Torres Airport (IATA: FAJ, ICAO: TJFA, FAA LID: X95) was a public use airport owned by the Puerto Rico Ports Authority and located 1 mile (1.6 km) south of Fajardo, a city in Puerto Rico. It is also known as Fajardo Airport.

Airport operations were shut down in November 2008 and transferred to the newly opened José Aponte de la Torre Airport in Ceiba. In February 2015 the FAA announced the permanent closure of the airport on April 30, 2015.

== Facilities ==
Diego Jiménez Torres Airport covered an area of 95 acres (38 ha) at an elevation of 64 feet (20 m) above mean sea level. The asphalt paved runway designated 8/26 measured 3,600 by 75 feet (1,097 x 23 m), and is marked closed.

== Airlines ==
At the time of closing, air taxi service was provided by the following airlines:

- Air Flamenco
- Isla Nena Air
- M&N Aviation
- Vieques Air Link

== See also ==
- List of airports in Puerto Rico
- Transportation in Puerto Rico
- Aviation in Puerto Rico
