= 1977 Vieques Air Link crash =

1977 airplane crash in Puerto Rico

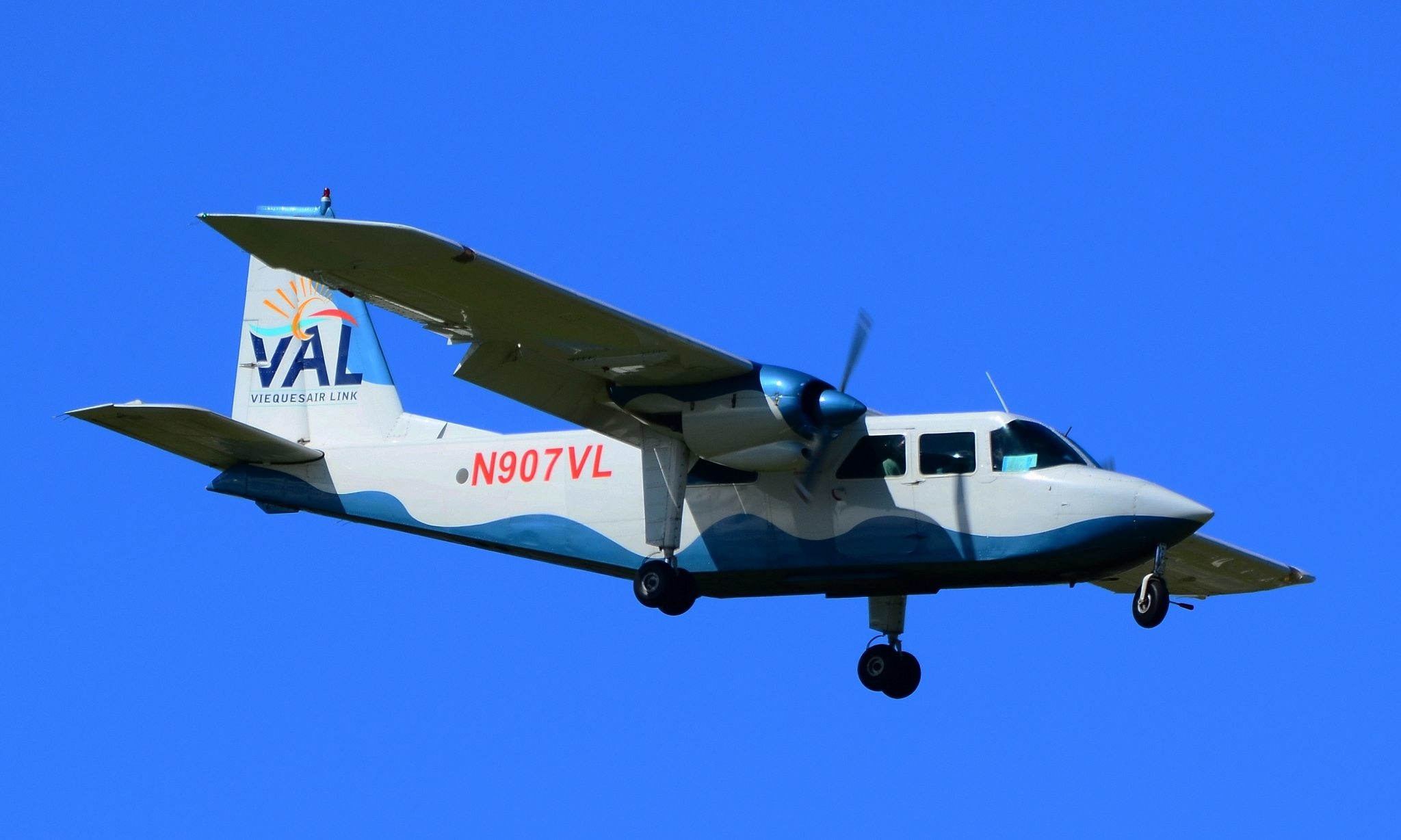
- Vieques Air Link Britten-Norman BN-2A-9 Islander, similar to the crashed aircraft but with a later VAL livery

Accident
- Date: 19 December 1977
- Summary: Pilot error
- Site: Vieques, Puerto Rico

Aircraft
- Aircraft type: Britten-Norman Islander
- Operator: Vieques Air Link
- Registration: N862JA
- Flight origin: St. Croix, United States Virgin Islands
- Destination: Vieques Airport, Vieques, Puerto Rico
- Occupants: 10
- Passengers: 9
- Crew: 1
- Fatalities: 5
- Survivors: 5, including the pilot

On 19 December 1977, a Vieques Air Link Britten Norman BN-2A Islander crashed into the waters off the Atlantic Ocean near Vieques, Puerto Rico during a flight from St. Croix, United States Virgin Islands to Vieques.

== Flight ==
The airplane was on an international scheduled flight between St. Croix, United States Virgin Islands and Vieques, Puerto Rico.

== Accident ==
The airplane started experiencing fuel starvation as it was near Vieques. The aircraft's engines flamed out due to the starvation, and the pilot decided to ditch off, or land the plane on the ocean, before the situation became more critical. The airplane crashed at 07:48AM local standard time.

== Passengers and crew ==
There were ten people on board the aircraft, nine of which were passengers and one, its 50-year-old pilot, who was the sole crew member. Of those, five died, all of them passengers. The pilot and four other passengers survived.

== Investigation ==
The investigation that followed blamed the pilot due to alleged inadequate pre-flight preparation or planning, which later resulted in his mismanagement of the aircraft's available fuel and then the double-engine flame out and subsequent crash.

== Vieques Air Link Flight 901A ==
Approximately seven years later, another Vieques Air Link islander, flying as Vieques Air Link Flight 901A, crashed near the same place after suffering engine problems too, flying a similar route but in the opposite direction.
