= Cape Air =

Regional airline of the United States

Coordinates: 41°40′10.23″N 70°17′31.37″W

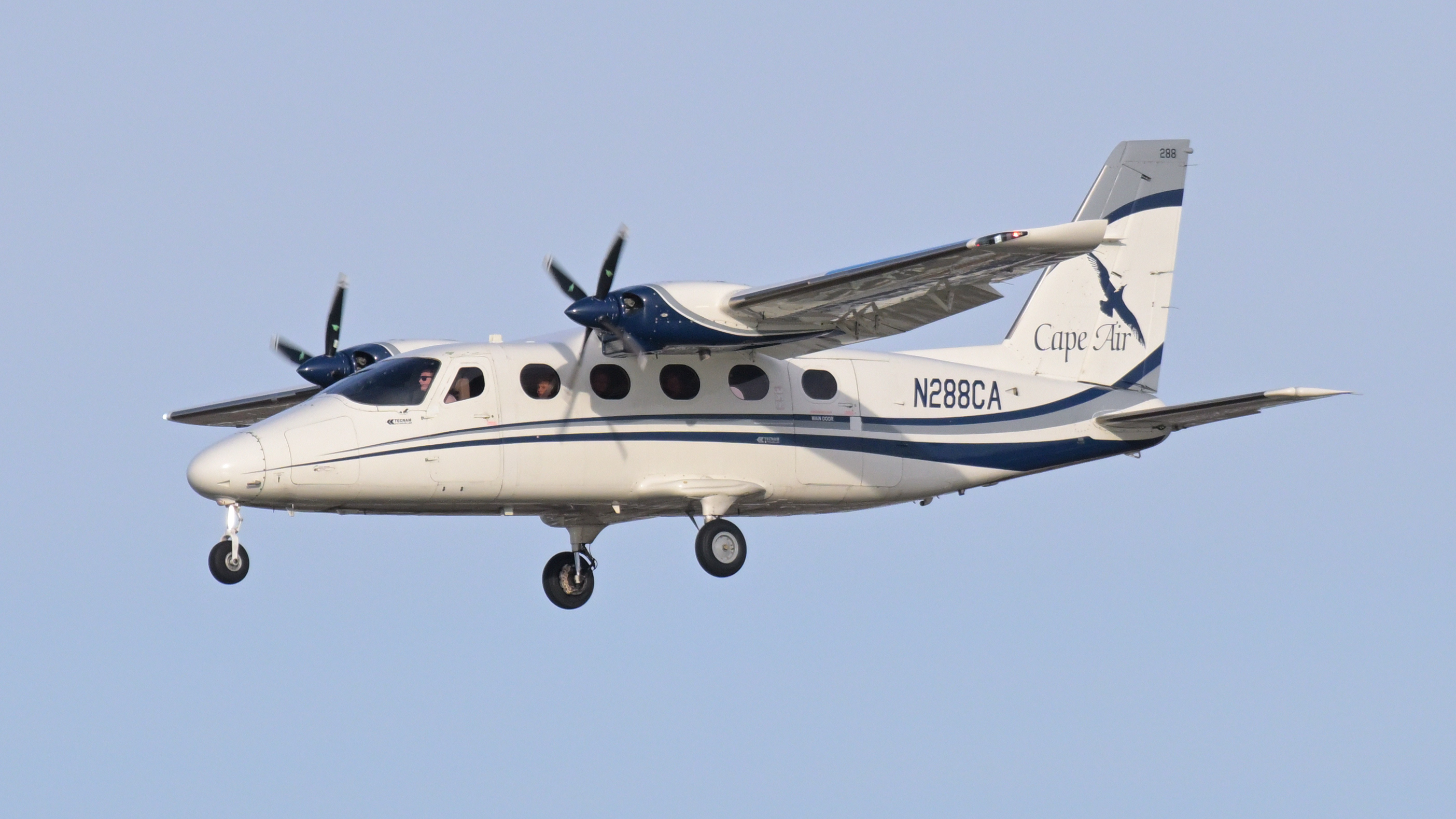
- Cape Air Tecnam P2012 Traveller
IATA	ICAO	Call sign
9K	KAP	CAIR
- Founded: 1989; 37 years ago
- AOC #: HYIA145B
- Operating bases: Billings; Boston; Hyannis; Martha's Vineyard; Nantucket; San Juan
- Fleet size: 98
- Destinations: 31
- Headquarters: Hyannis, Massachusetts, United States
- Key people: Daniel A. Wolf (Founder & Board Director); Linda Ann Markham (President & CEO)
- Revenue: $252.8M (2024)
- Employees: 651 (2024)
- Website: www.capeair.com; www.nantucketairlines.com

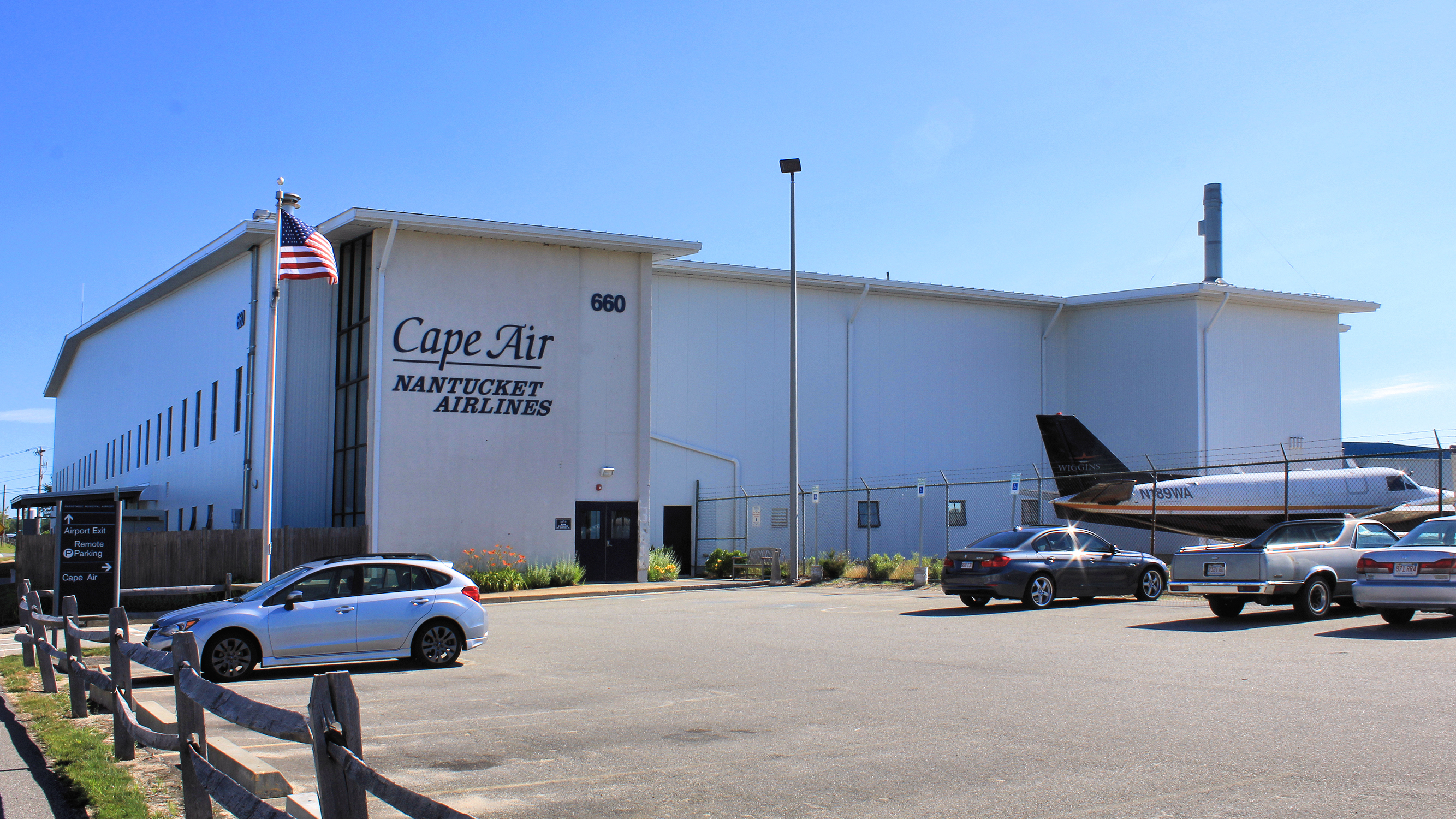
Cape Air headquarters in Hyannis, Massachusetts

Hyannis Air Service Inc., operating as Cape Air, is an airline headquartered at Cape Cod Gateway Airport in Hyannis, Massachusetts, United States. It operates scheduled passenger services in the Northeast, the Caribbean, and Eastern Montana.

The airline operates under the rules of Part 135 Commuter using light aircraft. It has interlining and codeshare agreements with other major carriers for ticketing and baggage transfers. Flights between Hyannis and Nantucket, Massachusetts, are operated under the Nantucket Airlines brand, also operated by Hyannis Air Service, Inc. The company slogan is We're your wings.

== History ==
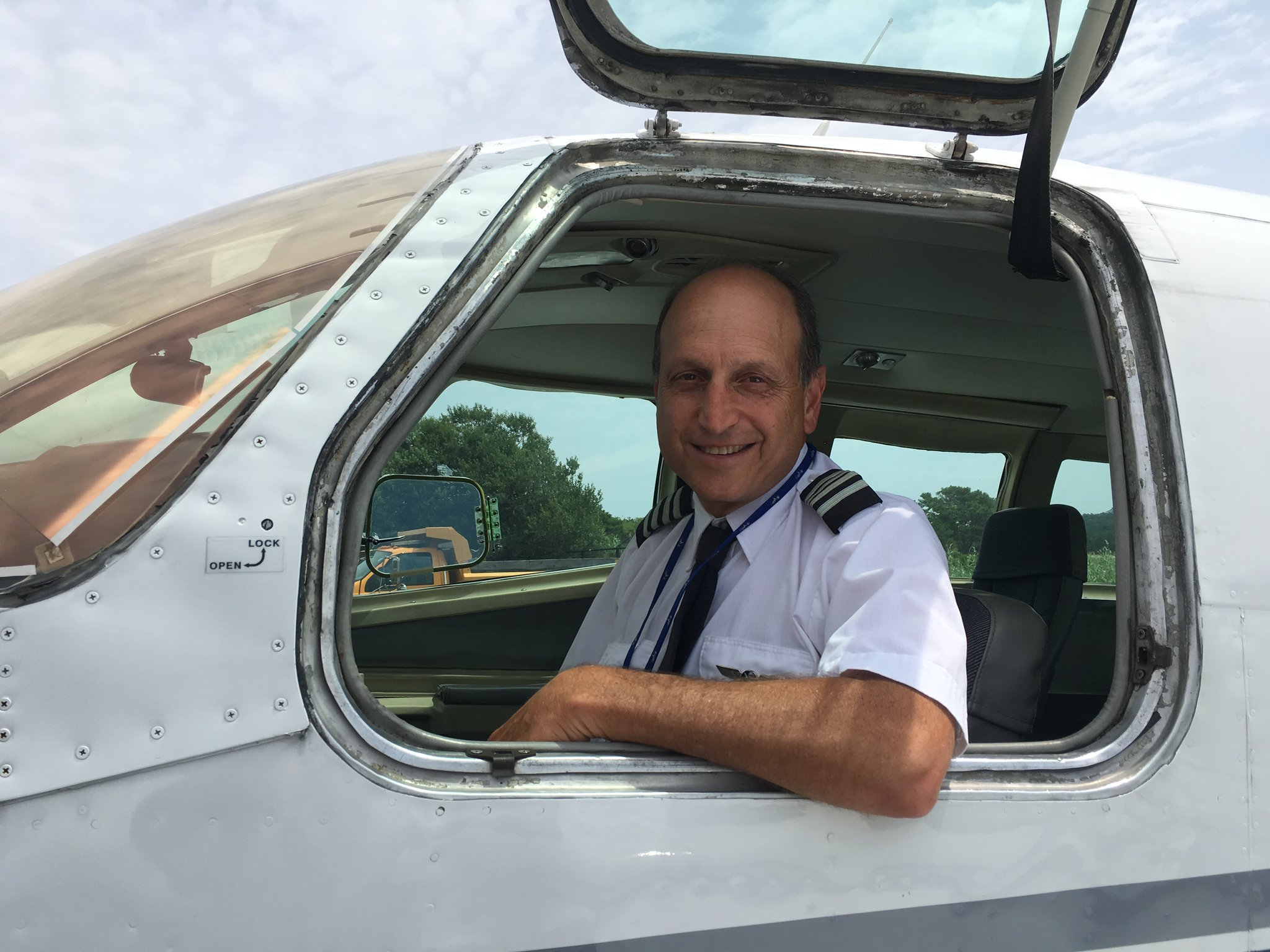
Cape Air founder Dan Wolf

Cape Air was co-founded in 1988 by company pilots Craig Stewart and Dan Wolf, and investor Grant Wilson. Initially, Cape Air flew between Provincetown and Boston in Massachusetts, a route that had been recently discontinued by Provincetown-Boston Airlines (PBA) after airline deregulation. Throughout the early 1990s new routes were added to destinations across Cape Cod and southeastern New England. In 1994, Cape Air and Nantucket Airlines merged and now offer hourly flights between Nantucket and Hyannis.

In 1993, Cape Air began service in Florida with flights operating from Key West International Airport to Naples Municipal Airport. Florida service expanded in 1996 with flights from Key West to both Fort Lauderdale-Hollywood International Airport and Southwest Florida International Airport in Fort Myers. Cape Air also began a network in Puerto Rico and the Caribbean in 1998, which were mostly based out of Luis Muñoz Marín International Airport in San Juan, Puerto Rico.

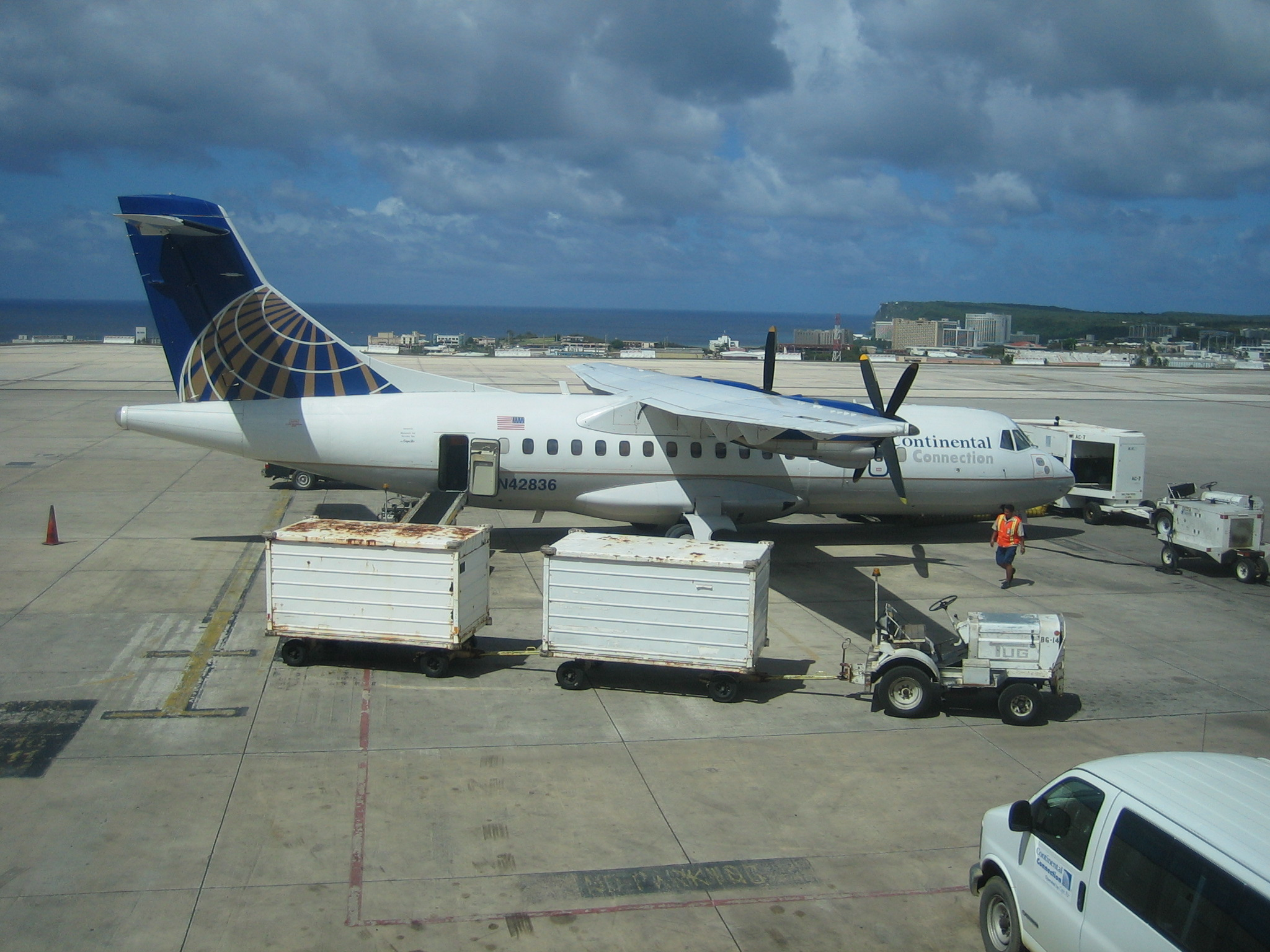
Former ATR 42 operated for Continental Connection

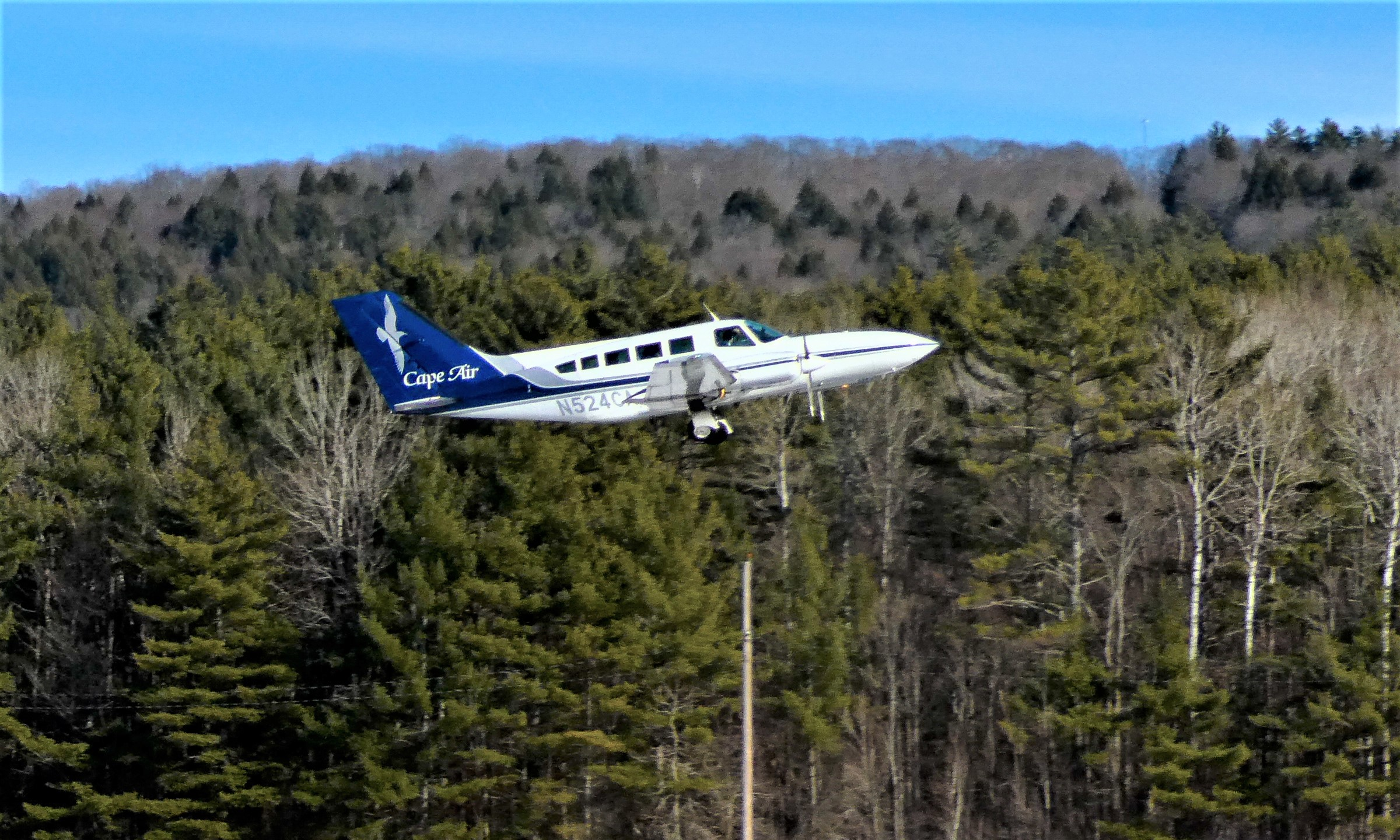
Cape Air Cessna 402 departing Lebanon Municipal Airport, Lebanon, NH

2004 marked the launch year of FAR Part 121 certification and a new hub of operations in Guam. This included a new fleet type consisting of three ATR 42 Turboprop aircraft. The startup team, led by Pacific Administrator, Captain Russell Price, launched scheduled service in July 2004 with the three ATR aircraft and two of the C402. Service was operated as Continental Connection, the regional brand of Continental Airlines, and flights flew from Guam to the Northern Mariana Islands of Saipan and Rota.

In the 2000s, Cape Air's flights in Florida between Fort Myers and Key West also began operating under the Continental Connection banner, though the Cessnas remained in the Cape Air livery. Cape Air also began flying flights for Continental Connection from Tampa International Airport to both Sarasota and Fort Myers (the latter route had been previously operated by Continental Connection carrier Gulfstream International Airlines).

In late 2007, the airline began a new round of expansion in the Northeast and Midwest. On 1 November 2007, the airline began service between Boston and Rutland, Vermont, with three daily round trips. The route is operated under contract with the U.S. government Essential Air Service (EAS) program. With the help of an intrastate minimum revenue guarantee, Cape Air expanded into Indiana on 13 November 2007, offering flights from Indianapolis to Evansville and South Bend. Passenger revenue did not grow quickly enough to make the operation economically sustainable once the revenue guarantee ended, so the last Cape Air flight in Indiana was on 31 August 2008.

Cape Air began flights between Florida Keys Marathon Airport and Fort Myers in 2008 but this service was discontinued a year later. By the end of 2009, Florida service was no longer operated as Continental Connection and flights from Fort Myers to Key West were Cape Air's only remaining Florida service. Cape Air ended all intra-Florida flights in 2013.

The airline expanded into upstate New York in early 2008, following the sudden demise of Delta Connection carrier, Big Sky Airlines. Cape Air began flying three daily round-trips on Essential Air Service routes from Boston to the Adirondack cities of Plattsburgh and Saranac Lake on February 12, 2008. The airline continued its expansion into New York when they started to fly the EAS routes out of Albany to Watertown, Ogdensburg, and Massena, and Rutland Airport. Cape Air commenced service from Rockland, Maine, and Lebanon, New Hampshire, to Boston on November 1, 2008. The company purchased four additional Cessna 402s to assist with the major growth.

Cape Air was also looking to offer services on the west coast. Cape Air submitted bids to offer service between Newport and Portland in the state of Oregon. The airline was hoping to be selected by the Newport city council to receive a financial grant to jump-start the service. Ultimately they lost out to SeaPort Airlines, which was able to start service sooner than Cape Air. However, in September 2013, the DOT selected Cape Air to provide EAS service between Billings and five communities in Eastern Montana, including, Sidney, Glendive, Glasgow, Havre and Wolf Point. Service in Montana started on December 10, 2013. The airline also expanded operations in the mid-Atlantic region. Cape Air provided scheduled flights from both the Hagerstown Regional Airport and the Lancaster Airport to the Baltimore/Washington International Airport (BWI). Service out of Baltimore ended in October 2012.

In May 2013, Cape Air named Linda Markham as the new president and chief administrative officer.

Cape Air carried 750,000 passengers in 2014 and offered up to 550 daily flights, achieving revenues of $120 million. Cape Air is the largest independent regional airline in the United States, with new routes driving steady increases over time.

In 2016, Cape Air started flying from Fort Lauderdale, Florida, to Bimini, Bahamas.

Cape Air flights in Guam continued operating under the United Express branding following the merger of Continental Airlines and United Airlines in 2010. On April 16, 2018, United Airlines announced the end of its partnership with Cape Air. Services ended on May 31, 2018, which marked the end of United Express operations in Guam, along with the retirement of the last turboprop aircraft in the United Express fleet.

In 2022 and 2023, Cape Air was flying between Chicago's O’Hare and Manistee, Michigan, Burlington, Iowa and Quincy, Illinois. The carrier had codesharing or interline agreements on each route with other carriers including American and United.

=== Pilots ===
In early 2016 the company had canceled flights citing a shortage of pilots. The Air Line Pilots Association disputed the existence of a pilot shortage instead citing low wages as the reason for the lack of pilots. Cape Air takes on pilots as co-pilots after 500-750h in entry-level roles like instructing. They are upgraded to captain after 1,500h as first officers and they can join partner JetBlue after 1,500h again in around two years. Cape Air also recruits pilots over 65, the mandatory retirement age for FAR Part 121 airlines, so long as they maintain a first-class medical.

=== Nantucket Airlines ===
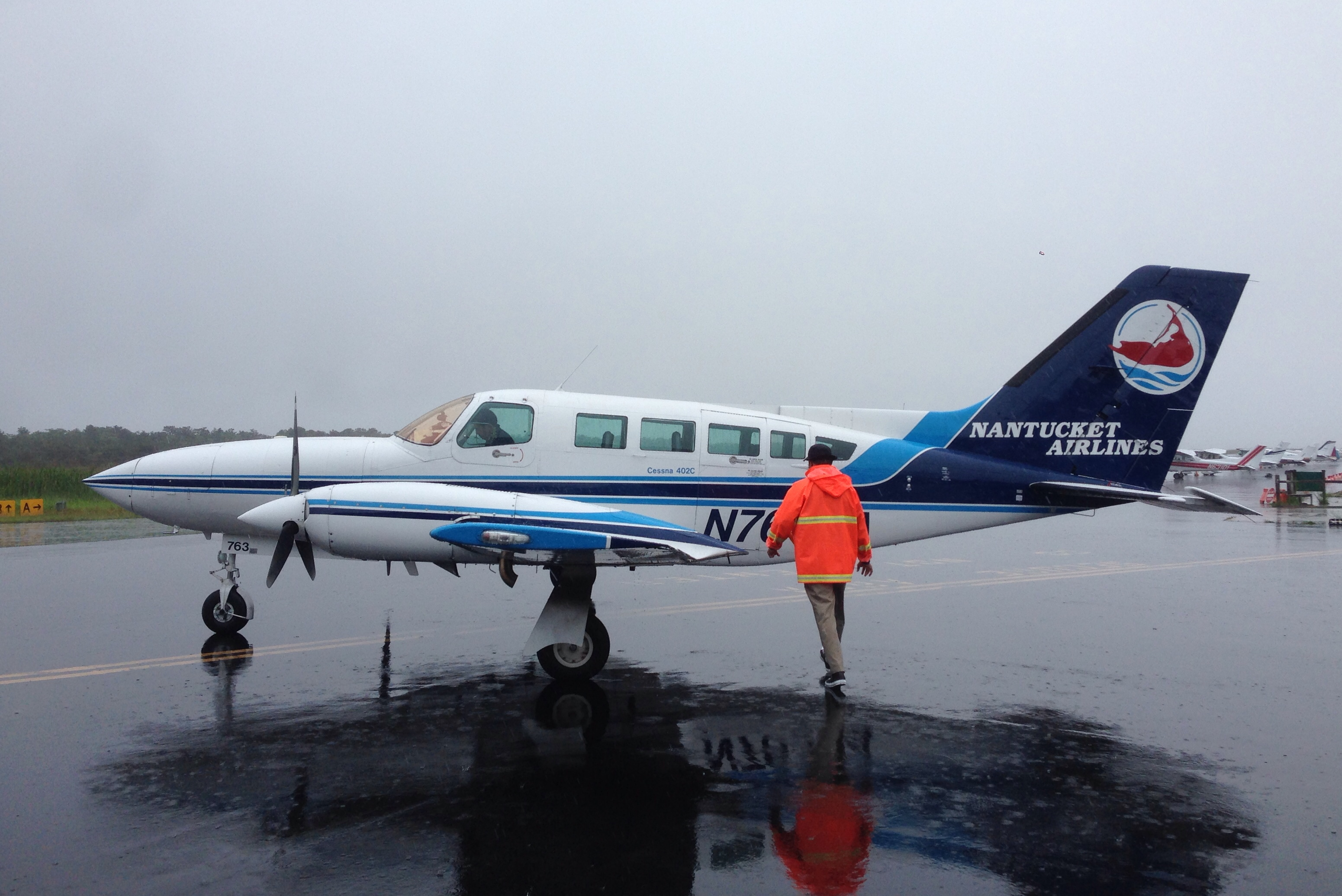
Nantucket Airlines Cessna 402

In 1994 Cape Air merged with Nantucket Airlines. Since then, Nantucket Airlines has operated as a sister airline to Cape Air focusing on flights between Nantucket Memorial Airport and Barnstable Municipal Airport. Nantucket Airlines utilizes a small sub-fleet of Cessna 402C Businessliners/Utililiners painted in Nantucket Airlines livery.

== Destinations ==
Cape Air operates three separate, disconnected sets of flights in the Northeast, the Caribbean, and Montana.

=== Northeast ===
City	Airport	IATA Code	Destinations
Maine
Augusta	Augusta State Airport	AUG	Boston
Bar Harbor	Hancock County–Bar Harbor Airport	BHB	Boston
Rockland	Knox County Regional Airport	RKD	Boston
Massachusetts
Boston	Logan International Airport	BOS	Augusta, Bar Harbor, Hyannis, Islip, Lebanon NH, Martha's Vineyard, Nantucket, Provincetown, Rockland ME, Rutland VT, Saranac Lake
Hyannis	Cape Cod Gateway Airport	HYA	Boston, Martha's Vineyard*, Nantucket*
Martha's Vineyard	Martha's Vineyard Airport	MVY	Boston, Hyannis*, Nantucket*, New Bedford, New York–JFK, White Plains NY
Nantucket	Nantucket Memorial Airport	ACK	Boston, Hyannis*, Martha's Vineyard*, New Bedford
New Bedford	New Bedford Regional Airport	EWB	Martha's Vineyard, Nantucket
Norwood	Norwood Memorial Airport	OWD	Martha's Vineyard, Nantucket
Provincetown	Provincetown Municipal Airport	PVC	Boston
New Hampshire
Lebanon	Lebanon Municipal Airport	LEB	Boston, White Plains NY
(New York (state)) New York
Islip	Long Island MacArthur Airport	ISP	Boston
New York	John F. Kennedy International Airport	JFK	Martha's Vineyard, Saranac Lake
Saranac Lake	Adirondack Regional Airport	SLK	Boston, New York–JFK
White Plains	Westchester County Airport	HPN	Lebanon NH, Martha's Vineyard, Provincetown, Hyannis.
Vermont
Rutland	Rutland–Southern Vermont Regional Airport	RUT	Boston

=== Caribbean ===
City	Airport	IATA Code	Destinations
Anguilla
Anguilla	Clayton J. Lloyd International Airport	AXA	St. Thomas
British Virgin Islands
Tortola	Terrance B. Lettsome International Airport	EIS	San Juan, St. Thomas
Virgin Gorda	Virgin Gorda Airport	VIJ	San Juan
Puerto Rico
Culebra	Benjamín Rivera Noriega Airport	CPX	San Juan, Vieques
Mayagüez	Eugenio María de Hostos Airport	MAZ	San Juan
San Juan	Luis Muñoz Marín International Airport	SJU	Culebra, Mayagüez, St. Croix, St. Thomas, Tortola, Vieques, Virgin Gorda
Vieques	Antonio Rivera Rodríguez Airport	VQS	Culebra, San Juan, St. Croix
(Saint Kitts and Nevis) St. Kitts and Nevis
Nevis	Vance W. Amory International Airport	NEV	St. Croix, St. Kitts, St. Thomas
St. Kitts	Robert L. Bradshaw International Airport	SKB	Nevis, St. Thomas
(United States Virgin Islands) U.S. Virgin Islands
St. Croix	Henry E. Rohlsen Airport	STX	Nevis, San Juan, St. Thomas, Vieques
St. Thomas	Cyril E. King Airport	STT	Anguila, Nevis, San Juan, St. Croix, St. Kitts, Tortola, Vieques

=== Montana ===
City	Airport	IATA Code	Destinations
Montana
Billings	Logan International Airport	BIL	Glasgow MT, Glendive, Havre, Sidney MT, Wolf Point
Glasgow	Glasgow Valley County Airport	GGW	Billings
Glendive	Dawson Community Airport	GDV	Billings
Havre	Havre City–County Airport	HVR	Billings
Sidney	Sidney–Richland Municipal Airport	SDY	Billings
Wolf Point	L. M. Clayton Airport	OLF	Billings

=== Codeshares ===
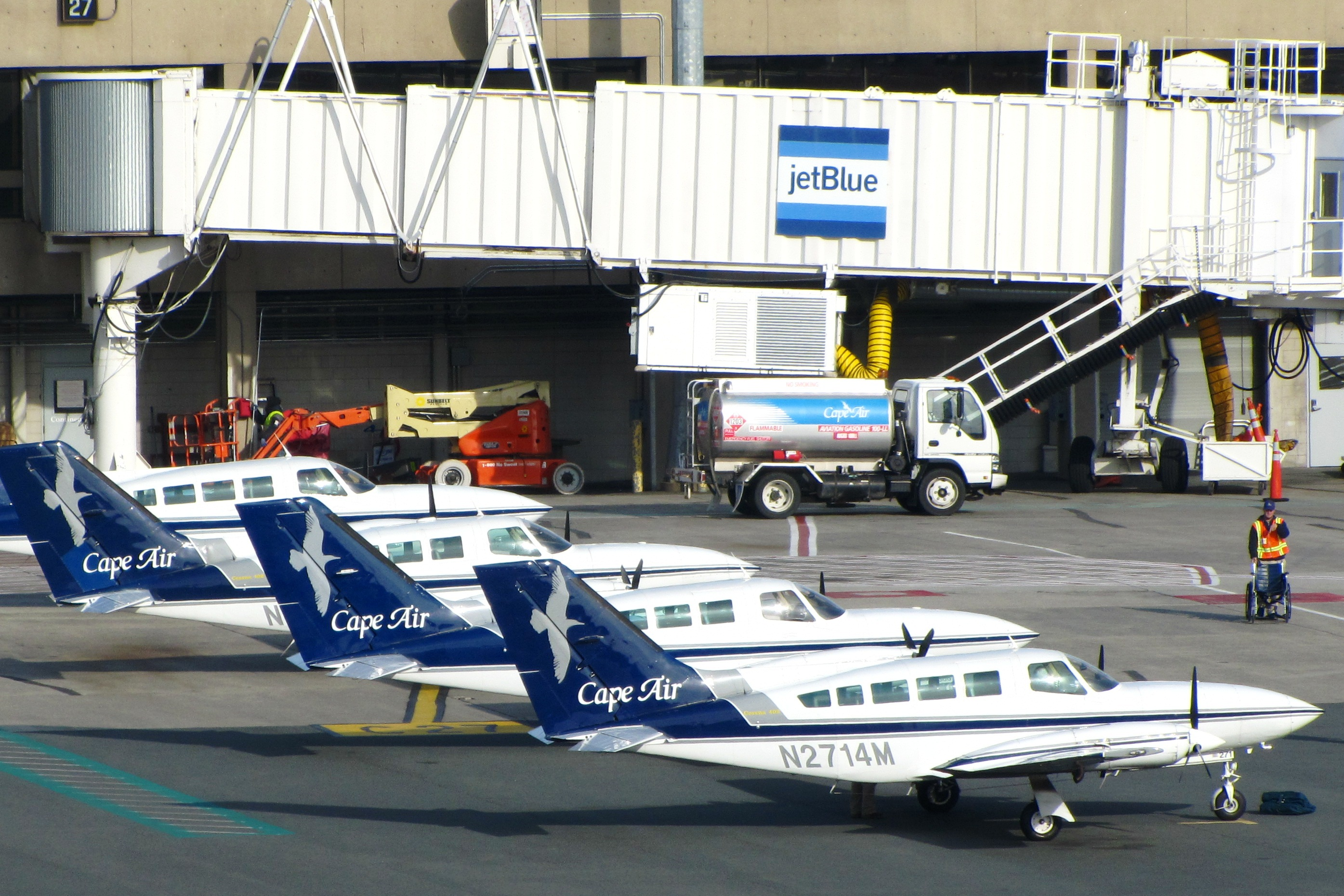
Cape Air Cessna 402's below a JetBlue jetway

==== JetBlue ====
Since February 2007, Cape Air and JetBlue Airways have had an interline agreement. The agreement allows Cape Air to carry JetBlue Airways passengers from Boston's Logan Airport and San Juan to Cape Air's destinations throughout the Northeast, Florida, and the Caribbean. The agreement allows customers on both airlines to purchase seats on both airlines under one reservation. Customers also get their baggage transferred, and Cape Air and JetBlue Airways are located in the same terminal in Boston, which allows for an easy connection. However, in San Juan, passengers must walk 10-20 minutes from Terminal A to Terminal D.

==== American Airlines ====
Cape Air and American Airlines (AA) announced a code-sharing agreement for the Caribbean in February 2013. The cities served by the AA codeshare are Anguilla, Nevis, Tortola, Vieques and Mayaguez. In the Midwest, Cape Air and American have had a code sharing agreement since 2010, which allows passengers from Marion, IL, Owensboro, KY, and Kirksville, MO, to connect in St. Louis, MO. This ended on July 31, 2023, and those airports now have service to Chicago, IL via Contour Airlines.

==== United Airlines ====
Cape Air has been a longtime partner with United Airlines (UA) and offers a code sharing agreement for many destinations. Passengers traveling through the Caribbean on select codeshare flights can enjoy special through-fares, advanced boarding passes and the ability to earn miles on a Cape Air flight.

=== Interline agreements ===
Cape Air partners with the following airlines to provide interline flow-through ticketing and baggage transfers:

- Alaska Airlines
- American Airlines
- Condor
- Delta Air Lines
- Hawaiian Airlines
- JetBlue
- Qatar Airways
- United Airlines

=== Seaplane base ===
The airline operates Cape Air Boston Harbor Seaplane Base near Logan International Airport, (IATA: BNH, FAA LID: MA87).

== Fleet ==
As of July 2024, Cape Air's fleet consists of the following aircraft:

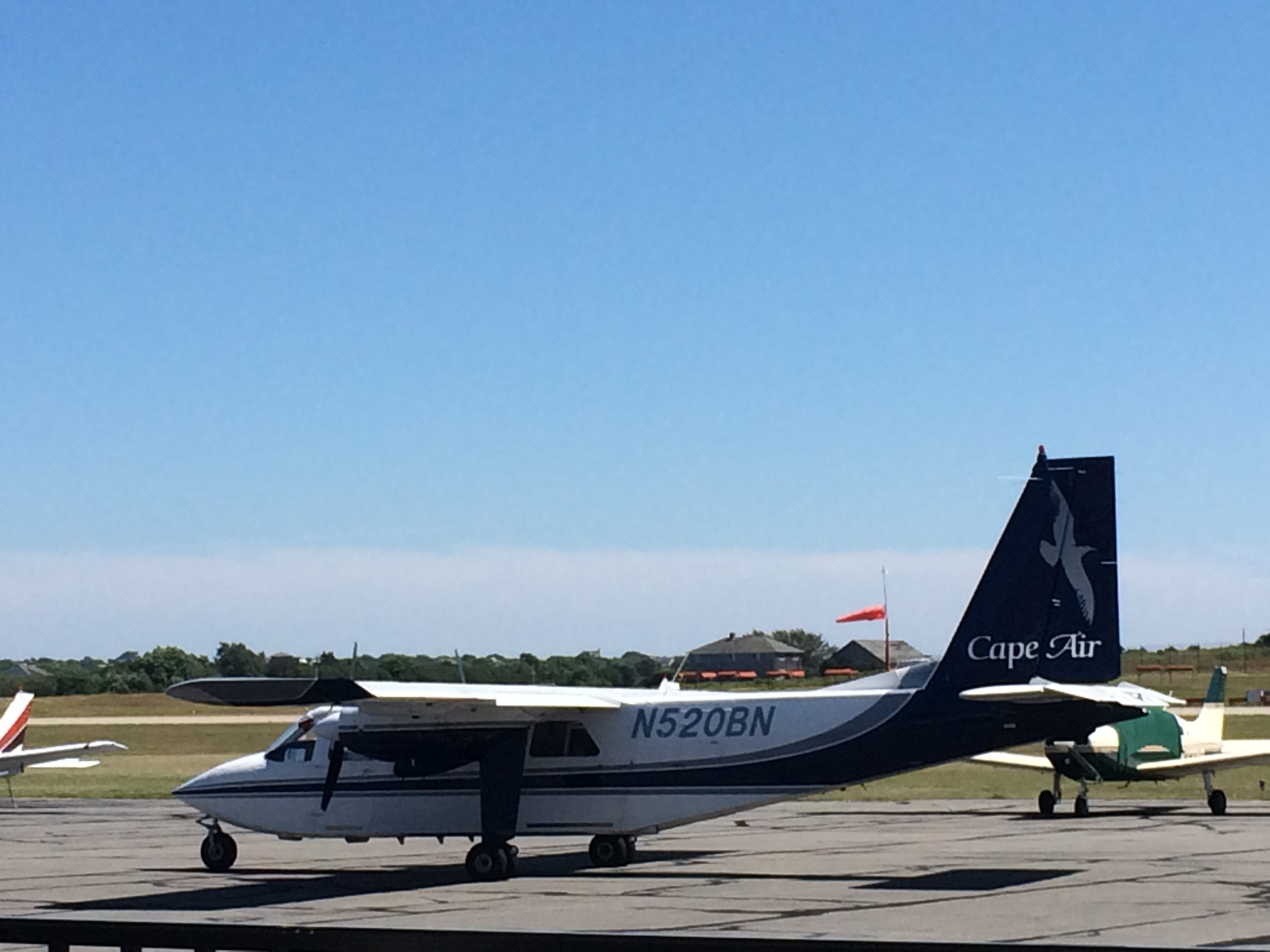
Cape Air Britten-Norman Islander

Type	Fleet	Orders	Passengers	Notes
Britten-Norman Islander	4	—	9	Operates in the Caribbean.
Cessna 208B Grand Caravan EX	—	8	TBA	Deliveries begin 2027. To operate Montana routes.
Cessna 402	64	—	9	9th seat is the unused co-pilot chair.
Tecnam P2012 Traveller	30	70	9	Remaining deliveries on hold.
Total	98	78		

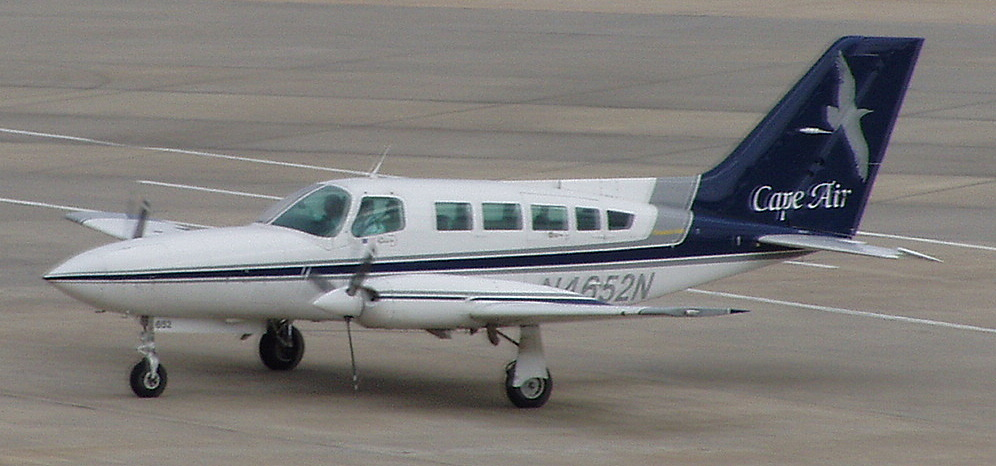
Cape Air Cessna 402C

In November 2010, Cape Air announced that it was considering new aircraft types to replace the Cessna 402. In April 2011, Italian aircraft producer Tecnam announced it will be producing the Tecnam P2012 Traveller. The aircraft made its first flight in July 2016. The first aircraft was delivered to Cape Air in March 2019. Cape Air formerly utilized the ATR 42 for United Express operations in Guam. However, when United retired its propeller fleet, the partnership ended between the two airlines. At the 2019 Paris Air Show, Eviation Aircraft announced that Cape Air would add the electric Eviation Alice aircraft to their fleet. However, the company halted operations in 2025.

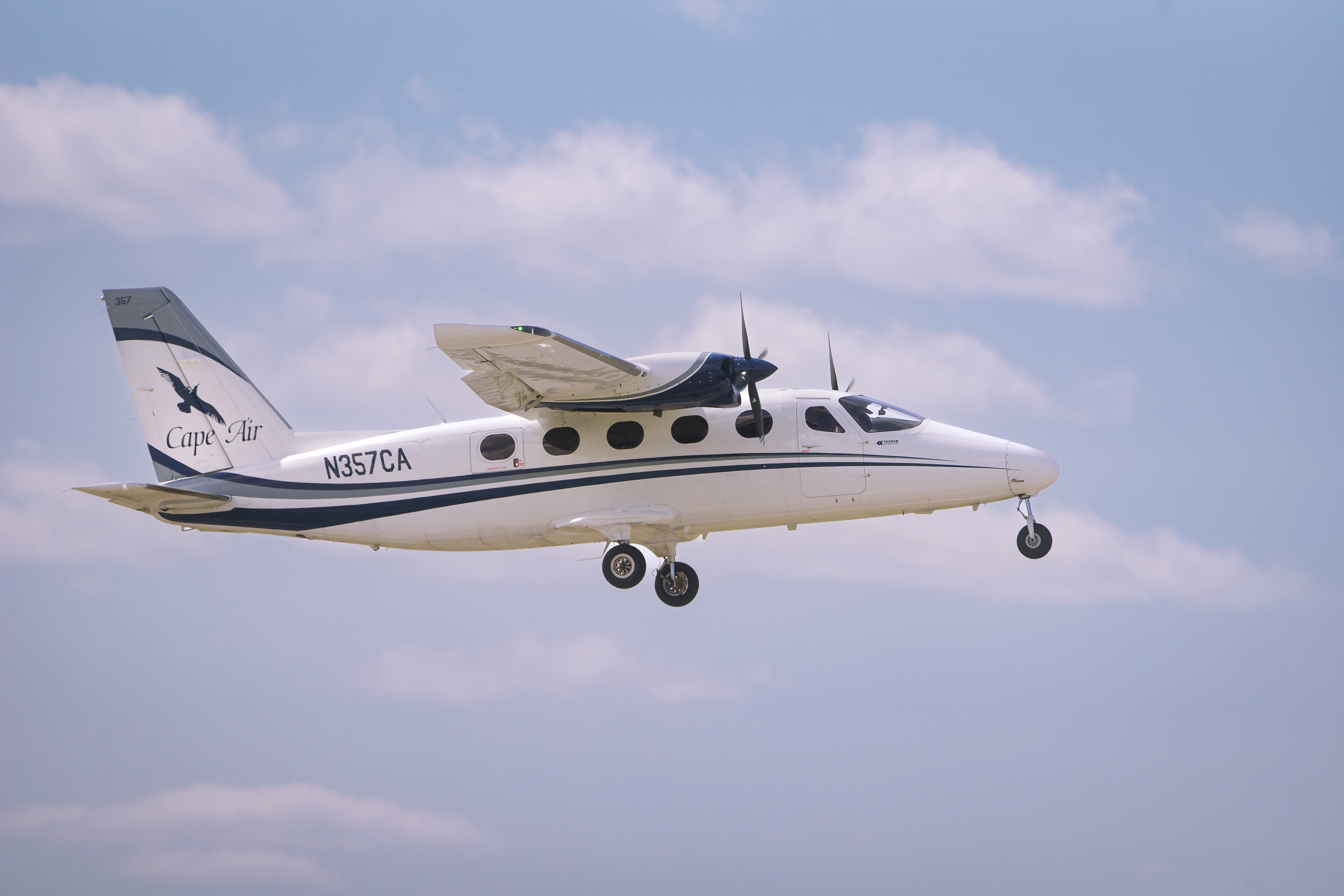
Cape Air Tecnam P2012 Traveller

== Accidents and incidents ==
- On January 30, 2001, a Cape Air Cessna 402C with one crew member and one passenger aboard impacted terrain while attempting a missed approach at Vineyard Haven Airport of Martha's Vineyard, coming from Providence, Rhode Island. The aircraft was destroyed. Both occupants survived but suffered serious injuries. The probable cause of the accident was later determined by the National Transportation Safety Board (NTSB) to be "the pilot's failure to maintain a stabilized approach with an adequate vertical and lateral track." The NTSB stated that "also causal was his failure to maintain obstacle clearance."
- On July 8, 2001, a repositioning flight to Nantucket crashed upon takeoff from Boston Logan. The Cessna 402C crashed into the runway after the pilot, the sole occupant, opted to waive the wake turbulence hold time and lost control when encountering wake turbulence from a Boeing 737-300 that had taken off prior. The aircraft was destroyed and the pilot survived with minor injuries. The NTSB later determined the probable causes of the accident to be "The pilot's improper decision to waive the wake turbulence hold time, and his subsequent loss of control when wake vortex turbulence was encountered."
- On June 12, 2007, Cape Air grounded its entire Cessna 402C fleet nationwide after three in-flight engine failures. The problem was blamed on premature wear on the crankshaft counterweight. All 402 services were canceled for two days while the counterweights were inspected and replaced as necessary. Normal service resumed about four days after the initial fleet grounding. The FAA stated that they were monitoring repairs, but that all action taken by Cape Air was voluntary and not ordered by the FAA.
- On September 26, 2008, a repositioning flight from Martha's Vineyard crashed while en route to Boston. Shortly after takeoff from runway 33, the Cessna 402C plane went down about two and a half miles from the airport, killing the pilot, who was the sole occupant. Prior to this date, Cape Air had maintained a fatality-free record over its 18-year history. The probable cause of the crash was later determined to be a loss of aircraft control due to spatial disorientation.
- On January 22, 2009, a Cape Air 402C with six passengers aboard during a night flight from Key West to Fort Myers, Florida, lost power in both engines as a result of fuel starvation due to faulty maintenance of the fuel selector. The aircraft made a successful emergency landing at Naples Municipal Airport.
- On February 1, 2010, a Cape Air 402C with one crew member and six passengers aboard suffered substantial damage following a runway excursion at Watertown International Airport in Watertown, New York. The airplane suffered an undetermined malfunction of its left airspeed indicator. The pilot opted to continue the approach despite this, likely due to feeling pressured by deteriorating weather conditions, rather than identifying and correcting the airspeed indicator anomaly or cross-referencing with other instruments. No occupant injuries were reported. The final NTSB found the probable cause of the accident to be "the pilot's decision to continue the approach with a known anomaly with the left airspeed indicator," and stated as well that "contributing to the accident was an undetermined malfunction of the left airspeed indicator and the condition of the runway, resulting in decreased braking capability."
- On September 9, 2021, a Cape Air 402C with one crew member and six passengers aboard went down in trees on approach to Provincetown Airport, coming from Boston. There were no fatalities, but occupants suffered burns and broken bones. The pilot told investigators that the aircraft was traveling faster than expected and the plane struck trees during an attempt for a go around.
- On September 17, 2024, a Cape Air 402C headed to Bar Harbor went back to Boston Logan and landed on one wheel. The pilot and two passengers exited safely.
