= List of airports in Puerto Rico =

This is a list of airports in Puerto Rico (an unincorporated territory of the United States), grouped by type and sorted by location. It contains public-use and military airports in the archipelago and island. Some private-use and former airports may be included where notable, such as airports that were previously public-use, those with commercial enplanements recorded by the FAA or airports assigned an IATA airport code.

== Maps ==
Commercial and General Aviation Airports
Red dot represents Luis Muñoz Marín International Airport (SJU) (main domestic and international airport with scheduled commercial service to the Caribbean, North, Central, and South America, and Europe)
Brown dot represents Fernando Luis Ribas Dominicci Airport (SIG) (domestic and international airport with scheduled commercial service within Puerto Rico handling private international flights)
Blue dots represent Rafael Hernández International Airport (BQN) and Mercedita International Airport (PSE) (domestic airports with scheduled commercial service to the contiguous United States)
Green dots represent Eugenio María de Hostos Airport (MAZ), José Aponte de la Torre Airport (NRR), Antonio Rivera Rodríguez Airport (VQS), and Benjamín Rivera Noriega Airport (CPX) (domestic airports with scheduled commercial service within Puerto Rico)
Orange dots represent Antonio (Nery) Juarbe Pol Airport (ARE) and Dr. Hermenegildo Ortiz Quiñones Airport (HUC) (general aviation airports without commercial service)
Airstrips and Seaplane Bases
Purple dots represent Mona Airport (PR-0001), Boquerón Airport (PR10), Lajas Airpark (PR25), Adjuntas Airport (PR20), Cuylers Airport (02PR), San Juan Seaplane Base (PR34), and Fajardo Harbor Seaplane Base (PR03)
Defunct Airports and Airstrips
Gray dots represent Cullingford Field (PR24), Santa Isabel Airport (PR27), Dorado Airport (DDP), Patillas Airport (X64), Diego Jiménez Torres Airport (FAJ), and Camp Garcia Vieques (PR18)

== Airports ==
This list contains the following information:

- **City served** – The city generally associated with the airport, as per the airport's master record with the Federal Aviation Administration. This is not always the actual location since some airports are located in smaller towns outside of the city they serve. It is not meant to be a complete list of cities served, which can be found in or added to each airport's Wikipedia article.
- **FAA** – The location identifier assigned by the Federal Aviation Administration (FAA). These are linked to each airport's page at the AirportIQ 5010 website (FAA contractor for the Master Record/Form 5010 database).
- **IATA** – The airport code assigned by the International Air Transport Association (IATA). Those that do not match the FAA code are shown in bold.
- **ICAO** – The location indicator assigned by the International Civil Aviation Organization (ICAO).
- **Airport name** – The official airport name. Those shown in **bold** indicate the airport has scheduled passenger service on commercial airlines.
- **Role** – One of four FAA airport categories, as per the 2021–2025 National Plan of Integrated Airport Systems (NPIAS) report released September 2025:
  - P-s: Commercial service – primary are publicly owned airports that receive scheduled passenger service and have more than 10,000 passenger boardings (enplanements) each year. Each primary airport is sub-classified by the FAA as one of the following four "hub" types (s):
    - L: Large hub that accounts for at least 1% of total U.S. passenger enplanements.
    - M: Medium hub that accounts for between 0.25% and 1% of total U.S. passenger enplanements.
    - S: Small hub that accounts for between 0.05% and 0.25% of total U.S. passenger enplanements.
    - N: Nonhub that accounts for less than 0.05% of total U.S. passenger enplanements, but more than 10,000 annual enplanements.
  - CS: Commercial service – nonprimary are publicly owned airports that receive scheduled passenger service and have at least 2,500 passenger boardings each year.
  - R: Reliever airports are designated by the FAA to relieve congestion at a large commercial service airport and to provide more general aviation access to the overall community.
  - GA: General aviation airports are the largest single group of airports in the U.S. airport system. They are public-use airports that do not have scheduled service or have scheduled service with less than 2,500 passenger boardings each year.
- **Enplanements** – The number of enplanements (commercial passenger boardings) that occurred at the airport in calendar year 2024, as per FAA records released September 2025.

City served	FAA	IATA	ICAO	Airport name	Role	Enplanements (2024)
				**Commercial service – primary airports**		
Aguadilla	BQN	BQN	TJBQ	**Rafael Hernández Airport**	P-N	360,345
Ceiba	RVR	NRR	TJRV	**José Aponte de la Torre Airport**	P-N	19,681
Culebra	CPX	CPX	TJCP	**Benjamín Rivera Noriega Airport**	P-N	14,663
Ponce	PSE	PSE	TJPS	**Mercedita Airport**	P-N	137,553
San Juan	SIG	SIG	TJIG	**Fernando Luis Ribas Dominicci Airport**	P-N	16,844
San Juan	SJU	SJU	TJSJ	**Luis Muñoz Marín International Airport**	P-M	6,490,669
Vieques	VQS	VQS	TJVQ	**Antonio Rivera Rodríguez Airport**	P-N	37,756
				**Commercial service – nonprimary airports**		
Mayagüez	MAZ	MAZ	TJMZ	**Eugenio María de Hostos Airport**	CS	9,207
				**General aviation airports**		
Arecibo	ABO	ARE	TJAB	Antonio (Nery) Juarbe Pol Airport	GA	–
Humacao	X63	HUC		Dr. Hermenegildo Ortiz Quiñones Airport	GA	–
				**Other public-use airports** (not listed in NPIAS)		
Mona				Mona Airport		
				**Notable private-use airports**		
Adjuntas	PR20			Adjuntas Airport		
Cabo Rojo	PR10			Boquerón Airport		
Vega Baja	02PR			Cuylers Airport		
Fajardo	PR03			Fajardo Harbor Seaplane Base		
Lajas	PR25			Lajas Airpark		
San Juan	PR34			San Juan Seaplane Base		
				**Notable former airports**		
Aguadilla			~~TJFF~~	Ramey Air Force Base (closed 1971, now Rafael Hernández Airport)		
Cabo Rojo	~~PR24~~			Cullingford Field (closed 2006)		
Ceiba	~~NRR~~	~~NRR~~	~~TJNR~~	Roosevelt Roads Naval Station (closed 2004, now José Aponte de la Torre Airport)		
Dorado		~~DDP~~		Dorado Airport (closed 1990s)		
Fajardo	~~X95~~	~~FAJ~~	~~TJFA~~	Diego Jiménez Torres Airport (closed 2008)	~~GA~~	
Patillas	~~X64~~			Patillas Airport (closed 2015)		
Santa Isabel	~~PR27~~			Santa Isabel Airport (closed 2015)		
Vieques	~~PR18~~			Camp Garcia Vieques (closed 1978)		

== See also ==
- Puerto Rico Ports Authority
- Transportation in Puerto Rico
- List of the busiest airports in Puerto Rico
- List of airports by ICAO code: T#TJ - Puerto Rico
- Wikipedia:WikiProject Aviation/Airline destination lists: North America#Puerto Rico (United States)
