= Fernando Luis Ribas Dominicci Airport =

Airport in San Juan, Puerto Rico

Fernando Luis Ribas Dominicci Airport Isla Grande Airport Aeropuerto Isla Grande
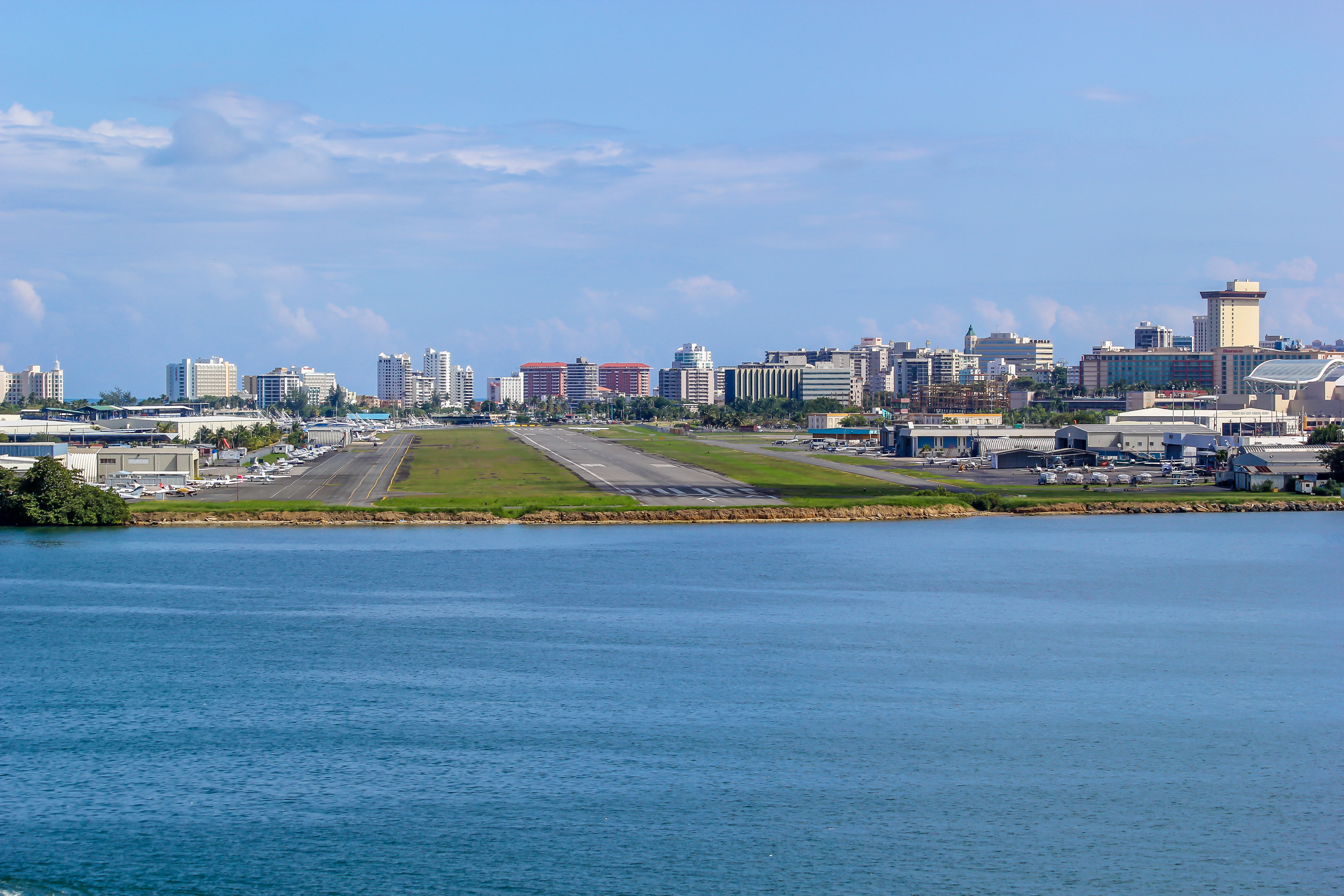
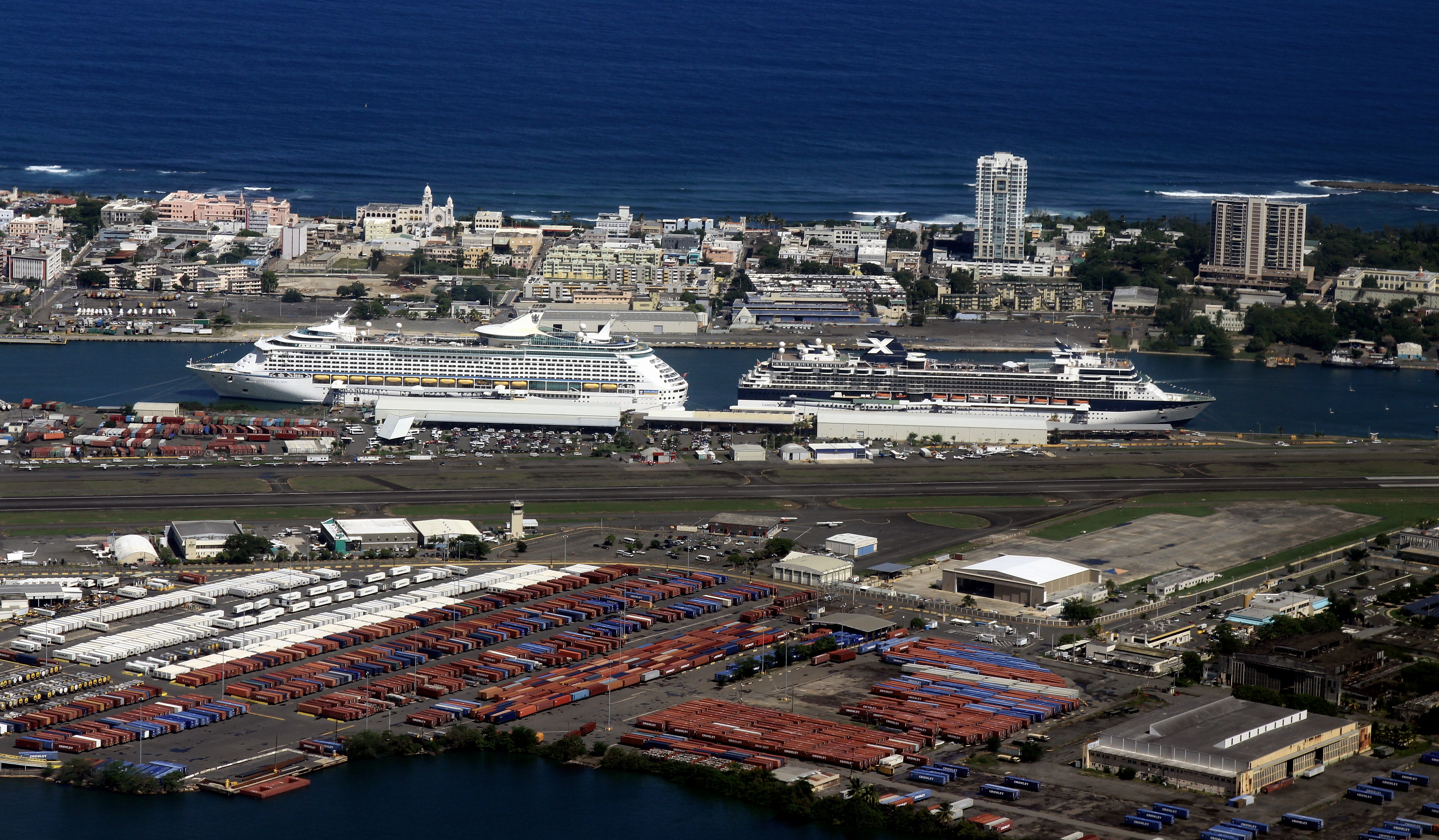
- West view of Fernando Luis Ribas Dominicci Airport from San Juan Bay, 2012 South view of Airport in-between San Juan Cruise Port and Port of San Juan, 2015
- IATA: SIG; ICAO: TJIG; FAA LID: SIG

Summary
- Airport type: Public
- Owner: Puerto Rico Ports Authority
- Serves: San Juan, Puerto Rico
- Location: San Juan, Puerto Rico
- Elevation AMSL: 10 ft (3.0 m)
- Coordinates: 18°27′24″N 66°05′54″W

Maps
- FAA airport diagram
- Location in Puerto Rico

Runways
Direction	Length		Surface
Direction	ft	m	Surface
9/27	5,539	1,688	Asphalt
- Source: FAA GCM Google Maps

Fernando Luis Ribas Dominicci Airport (Spanish: Aeropuerto Fernando Luis Ribas Dominicci) (IATA: SIG, ICAO: TJIG, FAA LID: SIG), commonly known as Isla Grande Airport (Spanish: Aeropuerto de Isla Grande) is a small airport in Puerto Rico serving the capital municipality of San Juan and its metropolitan area since 1929. Named after U.S. Air Force Major Fernando Luis Ribas Dominicci, the 102 acres (41 ha) airport is located on San Juan Bay in the Isla Grande district of Santurce barrio in San Juan, about 2 to 6 miles (3.2 to 9.7 km) from the Old San Juan historic quarter, Condado and Isla Verde resort areas, Hato Rey business center, and SJU main airport. It is situated in-between the San Juan Cruise Port, and the Puerto Rico Convention Center and the Distrito T-Mobile entertainment center.

While its primary activity is general aviation, Fernando Luis Ribas Dominicci Airport also handles small private international flights and commercial domestic flights, particularly between the main island and the Spanish Virgin Islands of Vieques and Culebra. It processed 35,871 total passengers in 2024.

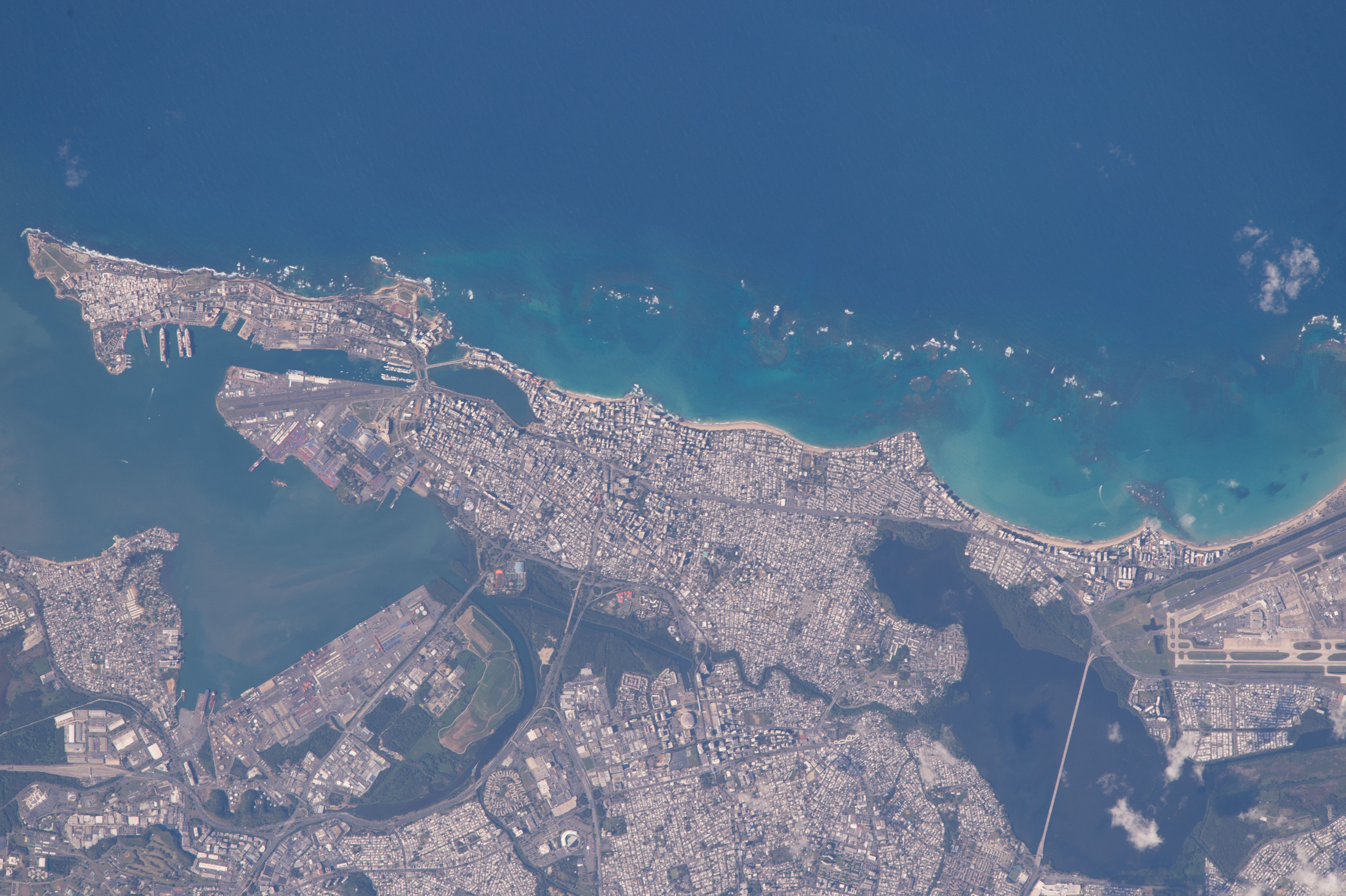
Satellite view from Old San Juan historic quarter (upper left) in San Juan Islet to Isla Verde resort area (upper right) in the Carolina municipality with SIG (upper left) and SJU (lower right) airports visible, 2016

== History ==
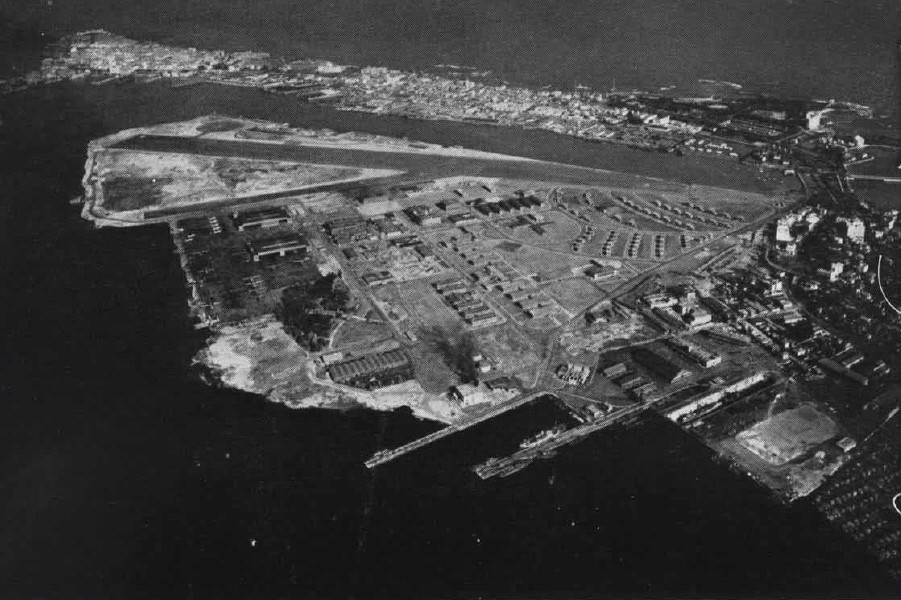
Naval Air Station Isla Grande of San Juan, Puerto Rico in the mid-1940s

Originally constructed by the U.S. Navy as Naval Air Station Isla Grande prior to World War II in 1929, the facility also served as Puerto Rico's main international airport until 1954, when Isla Verde International Airport (subsequently renamed Luis Muñoz Marín International Airport in 1985) was built. Until that year, all international airlines, such as Deutsche Luft Hansa, Iberia Airlines, Delta and Pan Am, flew to Isla Grande.

Until 1971, the airport also hosted Coast Guard Air Station San Juan. That year, the Coast Guard relocated its air station to Ramey Air Force Base on Puerto Rico's northwest coast.

Isla Grande was renamed in honor of United States Air Force Major Fernando Luis Ribas-Dominicci, an F-111 pilot who was killed in action during Operation El Dorado Canyon (the 1986 airstrike of Libya).

A controversy regarding Isla Grande and Dorado Airport surfaced in 2003. Dorado Airport wanted to expand and attract the private aviation sector that has been Isla Grande's main business for so long. Dorado airport eventually became a victim of urban development in Dorado and no longer exists.

In early 2003, it was announced that the Puerto Rico Grand Prix would be held on a 1.6 mile, 10-turn, temporary circuit on the airport's runway and taxiways as the season final of the 2003 SCCA Trans Am Series. The race, held on October 26, 2003, was won by Puerto Rican native Wally Castro. The event was initially on the 2004 Trans-Am Series schedule, but was cancelled a month before its running.

In 2006, after a detailed impact study and many rumors about the future of the airport, the Puerto Rico Ports Authority announced that Isla Grande airport would remain open for the foreseeable future, mostly because of its key function as the primary reliever for the Luis Muñoz Marín International Airport.

On August 4, 2011, the FAA announced that they were planning to close the airport's control tower due to budget cuts, since they operate it instead of the Puerto Rico Ports Authority.

On July 8, 2012, airport officials denied via written communication to a local newspaper of "any plans to eliminate or privatize the airport, since the airport is one of the most important airports for general aviation on Puerto Rico, taking into account that its operation approximates around 300 daily operations." On that same newspaper it was published that Seaborne Airlines, a regional air carrier, would transition its scheduled passenger operations to the neighboring San Juan Luis Muñoz Marin International Airport (SJU) with complete pullout on January 16, 2013.

For a short period of time between 2007 and 2009, the airport became the flight hub of Puerto Rico's unofficial flag carrier, Prinair, when that airline briefly returned to operating.

== Facilities and aircraft ==
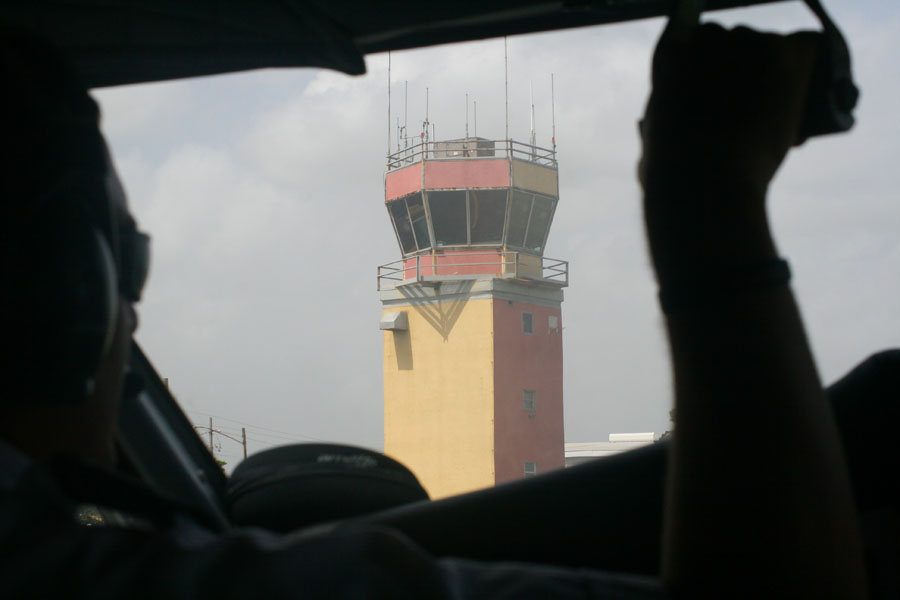
Control tower at the airport

Fernando Luis Ribas Dominicci Airport covers an area of 102 acres (41 ha) at an elevation of 10 feet (3.0 m) above mean sea level. It has one runway designated 9/27 with an asphalt surface measuring 5,539 by 100 feet (1,688 by 30 m).

For the 12-month period ending September 30, 2013, the airport had 116,447 aircraft operations, an average of 319 per day: 92% general aviation, 6% air taxi, and 2% military. At that time there were 232 aircraft based at this airport: 33% single-engine, 37% multi-engine, 1% jet, 24% helicopter, and 6% military.

== Airlines and destinations ==
=== Passenger ===
Airlines	Destinations
Air Flamenco	Culebra, Vieques
Vieques Air Link	Culebra, Vieques

=== Statistics ===
Carrier shares (May 2025 – April 2026)
Carrier	Passengers (arriving and departing)
Vieques	15,060(58.49%)
Air Flamenco	7,830(30.40%)
Fly the Whale	2,830(11.11%)

Top domestic destinations (May 2025 – April 2026)
Rank	City	Airport	Passengers
1	Vieques, Puerto Rico	Antonio Rivera Rodríguez Airport (VQS)	5,990
2	Culebra, Puerto Rico	Benjamín Rivera Noriega Airport (CPX)	5,530
3	Christiansted, United States Virgin Islands	Henry E. Rohlsen Airport (STX)	1,440

== San Juan Army Aviation Support Facility ==
The San Juan Army Aviation Support Facility operated by the Puerto Rico National Guard (PRNG) is the only military site on Fernando Luis Ribas Dominicci Airport. Its mission is to provide aviation maintenance support, and repair to the Puerto Rico Army National Guard and the following units:

- Company A, 1st Battalion, 111th Aviation Regiment
- Company D, 1st Battalion, 114th Aviation Regiment
- Detachment 1, Company B, 1st Battalion, 114th Aviation Regiment

The military aircraft at this facility are UH-72 Lakota and UH-60 Blackhawk helicopters and the Beechcraft C-12 Huron.

== Incidents and accidents ==
- On October 1, 1942, a Douglas C-39 (DC-2) of the U.S. Army Air Forces flying from Losey Field in southern Puerto Rico to Isla Grande crashed into a hill in Coamo instead, killing all 22 people on board.
- On April 11, 1952, Pan Am Flight 526A crashed into the sea just after takeoff due to engine failure, killing 52 out of 69 passengers and crew.
- On December 21, 1991, a United Airlines Boeing 757 flight en route to San Juan's Luis Muñoz Marín International Airport mistakenly landed at Fernando Luis Ribas Dominicci Airport. The aircraft, which was on a chartered flight as United Airlines Flight 5850, was later flown, without any passengers onboard (as the passengers departed from Isla Grande to their hotels by bus), to Luis Munoz Marin Airport.
- June 7, 1992: An Executive Air (for American Eagle) CASA 212 flying from Dominicci Airport crashed short of the runway in Mayagüez, killing both crew members and all three passengers.
- In December 2002, a helicopter that had been rented from a company that operates out of this airport was hijacked and taken to a jail in Ponce, where six inmates boarded the helicopter, forcing the pilot to drop them off at a farm. The pilot was able to fly back after he lied to the prisoners about their whereabouts, making them jump off the helicopter and zig-zagging the helicopter to prevent them from shooting at him. Soon after, all escapees were found by the police.
- On January 10, 2015, a Robinson R22 collided with the ocean (near Cataño Ferry terminal, San Juan bay) shortly after takeoff due to disorientation and failure to maintain rotor rpm, killing 1 (student performing a solo flight) and leaving the helicopter damaged beyond repair.
- On July 4, 2017, an aircraft that had taken off Ribas Dominicci Airport crashed nearby at a bay. The crash resulted in four injuries.

== See also ==
- Transport in Puerto Rico
- List of airports in Puerto Rico
- Aviation in Puerto Rico
