= José Aponte de la Torre Airport =

Airport in Ceiba, Puerto Rico

José Aponte De La Torre Airport Aeropuerto José Aponte De La Torre Aeropuerto Internacional de Ceiba
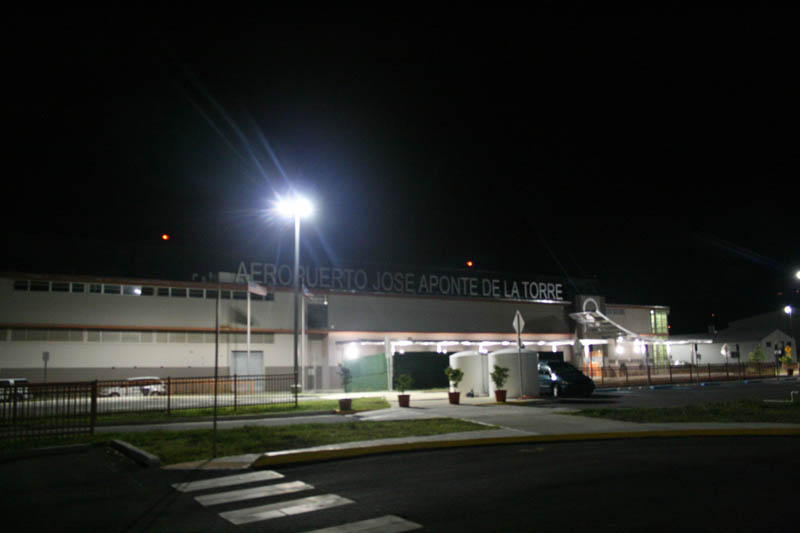
- Airport entrance, July 2009
- IATA: NRR; ICAO: TJRV; FAA LID: RVR

Summary
- Airport type: Public
- Owner: Puerto Rico Ports Authority
- Serves: Ceiba, Puerto Rico
- Elevation AMSL: 38 ft (12 m)
- Coordinates: 18°14′43″N 65°38′36″W

Map
- Location of airport in Puerto Rico

Runways
Direction	Length		Surface
Direction	ft	m	Surface
7/25	11,000	3,353	Asphalt/Concrete
- Sources: FAA GCM Google Maps

José Aponte de la Torre Airport (IATA: NRR, ICAO: TJRV, FAA LID: RVR) is a public use airport owned by Puerto Rico Ports Authority and located 2.3 mi (3.7 km) from Ceiba, a coastal town in Puerto Rico. It is included in the National Plan of Integrated Airport Systems for 2011–2015, which categorized it as a general aviation airport. The airport also offers scheduled passenger service via three commercial airlines to the islands of Vieques and Culebra, Puerto Rico.

The airport opened in November 2008 on the site of the former Roosevelt Roads Naval Station, replacing the Diego Jiménez Torres Airport (IATA: FAJ, ICAO: TJFA, FAA LID: X95) in Fajardo. The airport was used as a testing site for Google Loon, a project to deliver high-speed internet using high-altitude balloons.

== Facilities ==
José Aponte de la Torre Airport covers an area of 1,646 acres (666 ha) at an elevation of 38 ft (12 m) above mean sea level. It has one operating runway designated 7/25 with asphalt and concrete surface measuring 11,000 ft × 150 ft (3,353 m × 46 m). There is also a closed runway designated 18/36 which measures 5,800 ft × 100 ft (1,768 m × 30 m).

The San Juan VORTAC (Ident: SJU) is located 23.1 nautical miles (26.6 mi; 42.8 km) west-northwest of the airport. The Roosevelt Roads TACAN (Ident: NRR) is located on the field.

American Airlines donated an MD-82 to the Puerto Rico Aviation Maintenance Institute (PRAMI) mechanics school located at the airport, which sits on closed runway 18/36.

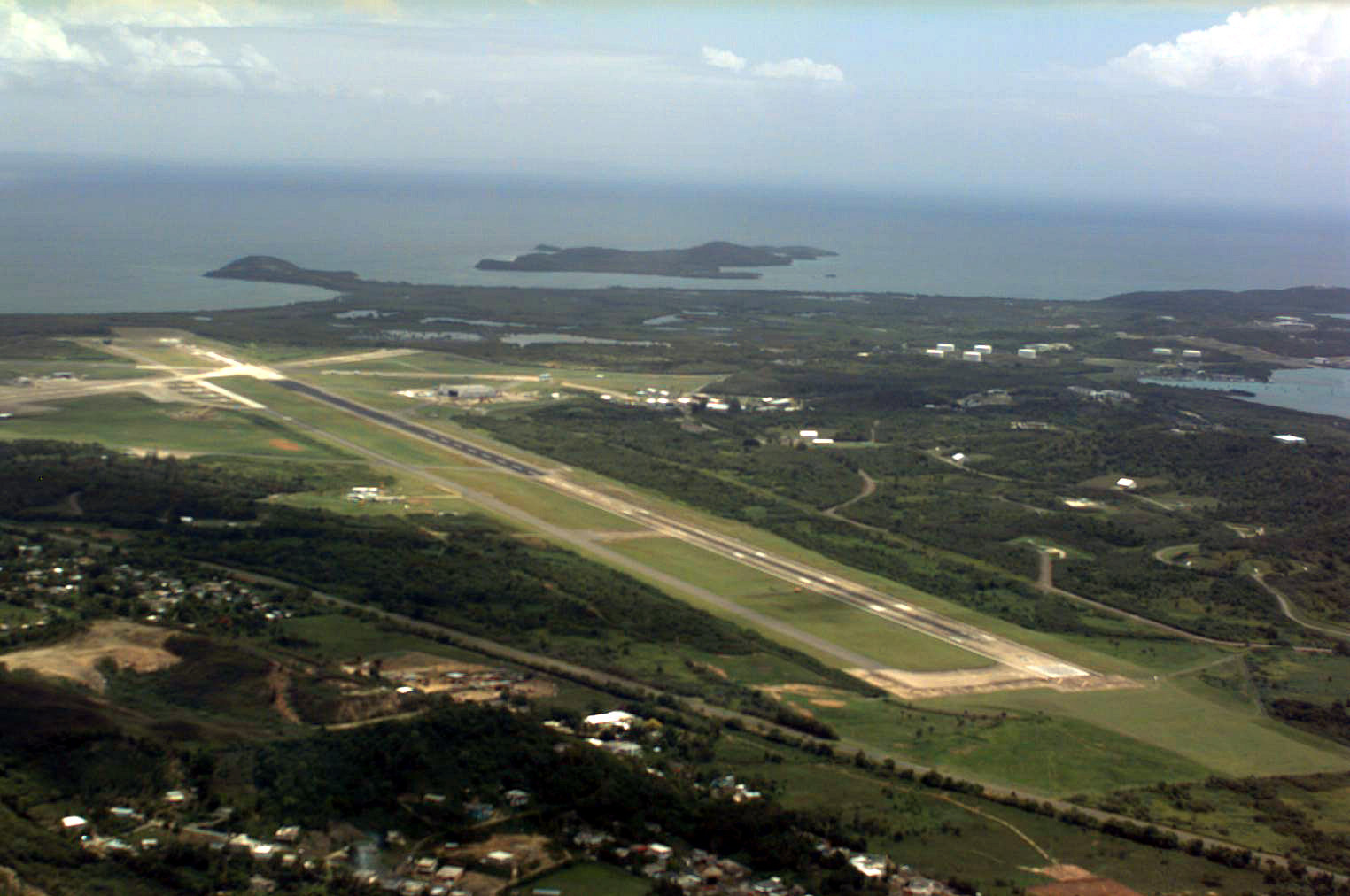
Aerial view of the former US Naval Air Station Roosevelt Roads, 1994.

== Airlines and destinations ==
=== Passenger ===
Airlines	Destinations
Air Flamenco	Culebra, Vieques
Vieques Air Link	Culebra, Vieques, St. Thomas

M&N Aviation operates charter flights.

== See also ==
- List of airports in Puerto Rico
- Transportation in Puerto Rico
