= Boquerón Airport =

Airport in Puerto Rico

- IATA: none; ICAO: none; FAA LID: PR10

Summary
- Airport type: Private
- Owner: Palmas Reales S.E.
- Location: Cabo Rojo, near Boquerón, Puerto Rico
- Elevation AMSL: 3 ft (0.91 m)
- Coordinates: 18°00′38″N 067°08′30″W

Map
- Location in Puerto Rico

Runways
Direction	Length		Surface
Direction	ft	m	Surface
6/24	3,000	914	Asphalt
- Source: FAA GCM Google Maps

Boquerón Airport (FAA LID: PR10) is a private airstrip 2.2 miles (3.5 km) east-southeast of the coastal town of Boquerón in the municipality of Cabo Rojo, Puerto Rico. It is located on road PR-301, and it has a single asphalt runway.

The Mayaguez VOR-DME (Ident: MAZ) is located 14.8 nautical miles (17.0 mi) north of the airstrip. The Borinquen VORTAC (Ident: BQN) is located 29.3 nautical miles (33.7 mi) north of the runway.

== See also ==
- Transport in Puerto Rico
- List of airports in Puerto Rico
