= Air Flamenco =

Airline of Puerto Rico

IATA	ICAO	Call sign
F4	WAF	FLAMENCO
- Founded: 1976
- AOC #: UOIA831U
- Fleet size: 13
- Destinations: 8
- Headquarters: Culebra, Puerto Rico
- Website: https://www.flyairflamenco.com

Air Flamenco is a commuter airline operated by Air Charter, Inc., based in Puerto Rico.

== History ==
Air Flamenco traces its history to Flamenco Airways, which was founded in 1976 by Rubén Torres. The first aircraft used was the Piper Cherokee 6 with flights between the islands of Culebra and Vieques. Six months after initial operation they acquired their first twin engine Britten-Norman Islander with a capacity of 9 passengers. With this new aircraft their service expanded with more passenger routes and US postal service between the two islands of Vieques and Culebra and the main island of Puerto Rico. Within the following five years, the airline increased its fleet to 6 aircraft expanding its services and charter flights throughout the Caribbean Islands including US and British Virgin Islands.In 2009 the airline acquired 2 other Britten Norman Islanders for cargo flights.

The airline is based at 4 locations: Fernando Luis Ribas Dominicci Airport better known as the Isla Grande Airport, San Juan; José Aponte de la Torre Airport, Ceiba, Puerto Rico; Benjamín Rivera Noriega Airport, Culebra; and Antonio Rivera Rodríguez Airport, Vieques. Current destinations are cities in Puerto Rico, the Leeward Islands, and the Dominican Republic. Air Flamenco is currently the largest Britten-Norman Islander operator.

== Fleet ==
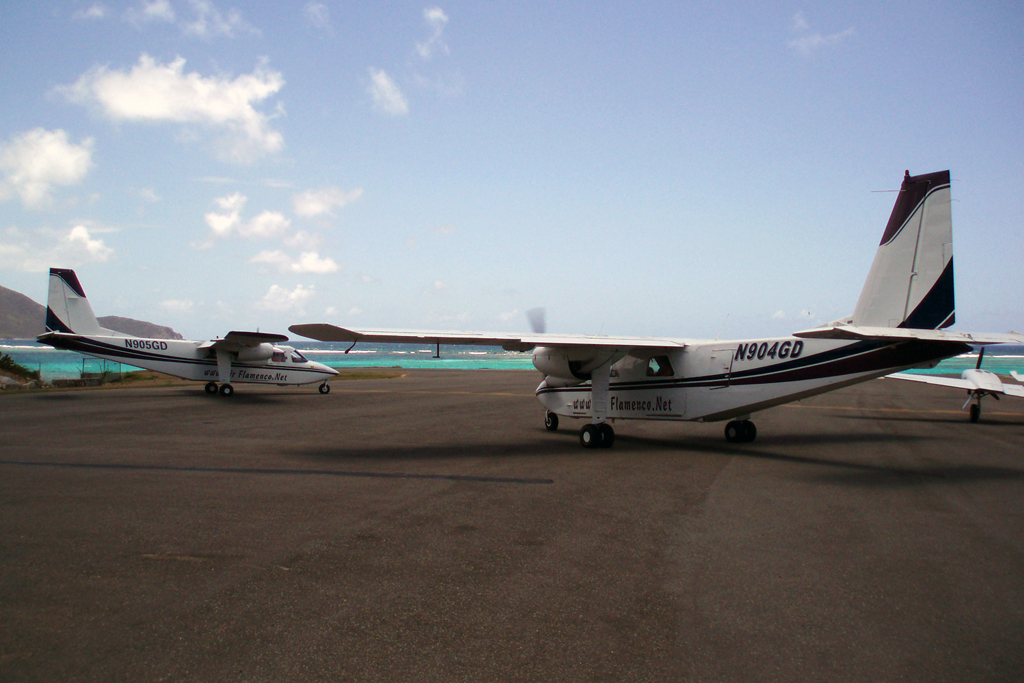
Air Flamenco Britten-Norman Islander II in Virgin Gorda

- 8 Britten-Norman Islander
- 1 Britten-Norman Trislander
- 4 Short 360-300F

Besides being operated in passenger service, versions of all three of types are flown in all-cargo configuration by Flamenco Cargo, a division of Air Flamenco.

== Accidents ==
- N902GD, a Pilatus Britten-Norman BN-2A-27 Islander en route from Mayagüez to Isla Grande Airport, San Juan crashed. The airplane, transporting a bank's financial documents, departed Mayagüez at 18:30 on 29 September 2004. En route the airplane approached and penetrated a level 4-5 rain shower. Control was lost and the plane crashed into the sea. There was one fatality.
- N909GD, a Britten-Norman BN-2A Islander, en route from Ceiba, PR to Culebra crashed on October 6, 2013, near Luis Peña while flying newspapers from the main island. No passengers were on board, however, the pilot did not survive.
- N821RR, a Britten-Norman BN-2A-9 Islander, crashed during landing at Culebra Airport on February 15, 2022. The aircraft landed hard, and veered off the right side of the runway. The aircraft was written off due to structural failure.
- N916GD, a Short 360-300, made a gear-up landing at St. Croix on May 14, 2024.
- N915GD, a Short 360-300, landed short of the runway at Terrance B. Lettsome International Airport in the British Virgin Islands on November 6, 2024. The aircraft was undamaged, however multiple runway lights and fence posts were destroyed. An investigation by the AAIB was unable to come to a definitive conclusion due to lack of evidence and information.
