= Vieques Air Link =

Puerto Rican airline

IATA	ICAO	Call sign
V4	VES	VIEQUES
- Founded: 1965
- AOC #: VLIA127A
- Hubs: Antonio Rivera Rodríguez Airport
- Secondary hubs: Roosevelt Roads Airport(TJRV), “Roosevelt Roads Aviation Services, LLC”
- Focus cities: CPX, RVR, SIG, VQS
- Fleet size: 11
- Destinations: 4 Destinations Scheduled(SIG, VQS, RVR, CPX), other 4 Dest. have to be Charter Flights.
- Parent company: Blue Water Air Charters, LLC
- Headquarters: VIG Tower, Santurce, Puerto Rico
- Key people: Carlos Rodriguez
- Employees: 29(Estimate)
- Website: viequesairlink.com

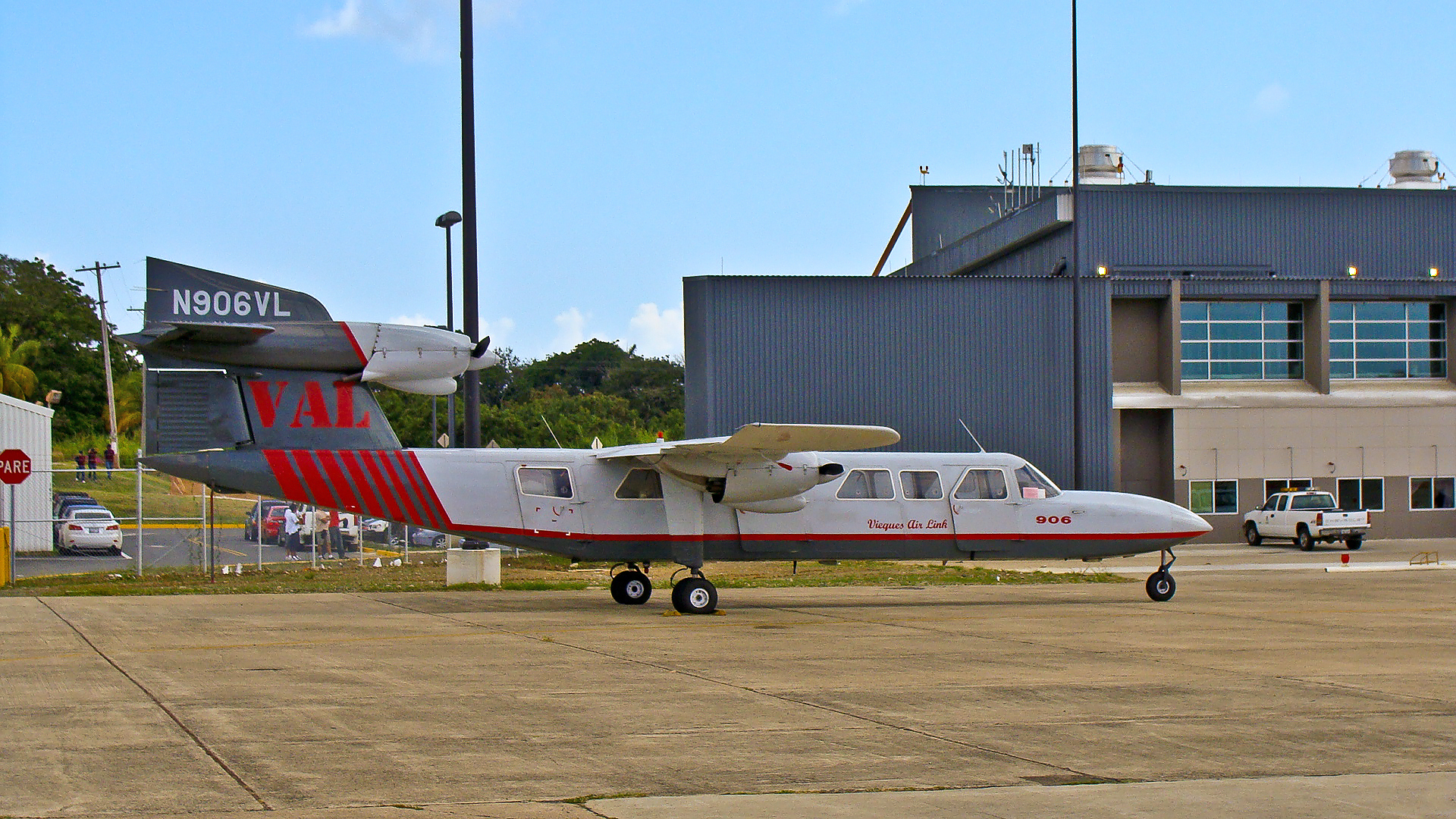
A Vieques Air Link Britten-Norman BN-2A Mk3-2 Trislander

Vieques Air Link (VAL, IATA code: V4) is a small VFR (Visual Flight Rules) Puerto Rico-based airline that operates under FAR Part 135, that links Vieques and Culebra with mainland Puerto Rico.

== History ==
Operations began during 1965, with owner Osvaldo "Val" Gonzalez-Duriex piloting a plane with three passengers from Vieques to Humacao. A Cherokee aircraft and another airplane were also acquired later, allowing the airline to serve Isla Verde International Airport.

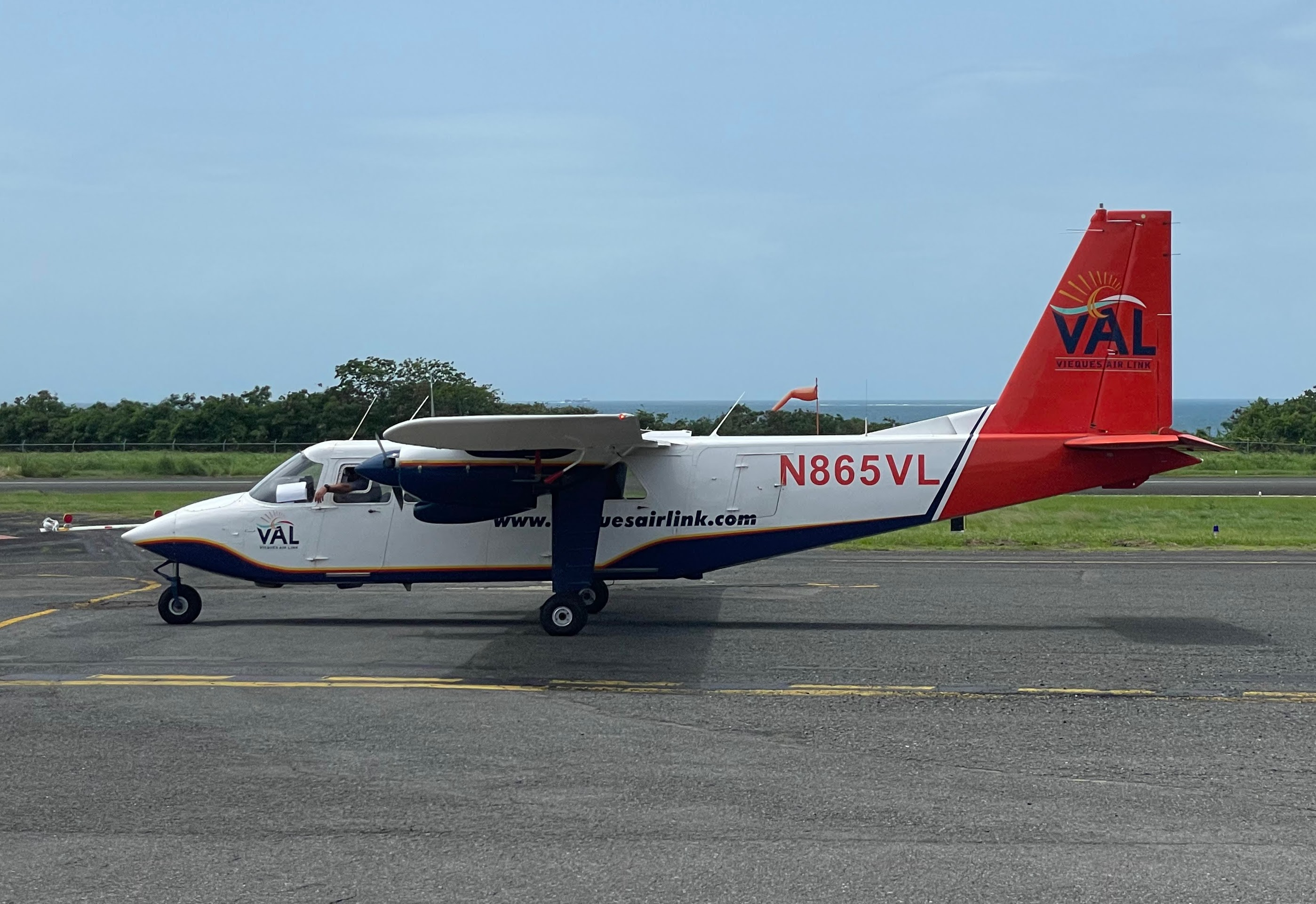
A Vieques Air Link BN-2B-27 Islander

In 1968, Vieques Air Link added a flight to St. Croix in the Virgin Islands.

In 1980 Fajardo Airport in Fajardo was built and Vieques Air Link started flights to the new airport immediately. In the 1980s the company increased the frequency of flights to San Juan, Humacao and Culebra. In 1989, Vieques Air Link lost its entire fleet to Hurricane Hugo. However, it soon acquired seven Britten-Norman Islanders and three Trislanders.

In the 1990s VAL got into financial trouble. However, with the Vieques conflict, more and more Puerto Ricans began flying Vieques Air Link every day to go to military camps to protest, and the police also had to fly their personnel and the people arrested in those areas on VAL planes at various times. Others, like political leaders Ruben Berrios and Fernando Martín, and the 2002 Miss Puerto Rico Carla Tricoli, who is a Viequense, have had pictures taken by the press aboard VAL planes while flying to Vieques, giving the airline a new wave of unpaid-for promotional attention. In addition, in June 2000, the airline made the cover of Islander News magazine, under the headline "Vieques Air Link: How To Survive a Hurricane", about the airline's fleet loss of 1989 and how it survived the potentially fatal financial disaster.

In 2008, VAL added a new route between Antonio Rivera Rodríguez Airport (TJVQ) in Vieques and the new José Aponte de la Torre Airport (TJRV) at the former Roosevelt Roads Naval Base (NRR) in Ceiba, shortening the flight between Vieques and the Puerto Rican mainland to seven or eight minutes in a Britten-Norman Islander (BN2P), or Piper Cherokee (PA-32-260).

== Destinations ==
Vieques Air Link, Inc provides flights at the following locations:

^{[Hub]}	Hub
^{[F]}	Future destination
^{[S]}	Seasonal
^{[T]}	Charter destinations
	Scheduled Destinations

City	Country	IATA	ICAO	Airport	Refs
Aguadilla, Puerto Rico	Puerto Rico	BQN	TJBQ	Rafael Hernandez Airport	
Ceiba, Puerto Rico	Puerto Rico	RVR	TJRV	José Aponte de la Torre Airport	
Culebra	Puerto Rico	CPX	TJCP	Benjamín Rivera Noriega Airport	
San Juan	Puerto Rico	SIG	TJIG	Isla Grande Airport	
San Juan	Puerto Rico	SJU	TJSJ	Luis Muñoz Marín International Airport	
St. Croix	United States Virgin Islands	STX	TISX	Henry E. Rohlsen Airport	
St. Thomas, USVI	United States Virgin Islands	STT	TIST	Cyril E. King Airport	
Vieques	Puerto Rico	VQS	TJVQ	Antonio Rivera Rodríguez Airport	

== Fleet ==
Aircraft	In fleet	Notes
Piper PA-32 Cherokee Six	4	Passenger
Britten-Norman Islander	7	Passenger/Med Transport/Cargo
Britten-Norman Trislander	1	Cargo

== Accidents and incidents ==
- On January 26, 1980, a bomb was found on a Vieques Air Link plane that was about to be flown by Raul Mari Pesquera, son of Juan Mari Bras (in Spanish).
- On August 2, 1984, an Islander, N589SA, operating as Vieques Air Link Flight 901A, crashed on initial climb out of Vieques en route to St. Croix. The Islander was overloaded by 600–700 pounds when it departed Vieques. Also, its centre of gravity was up to 5 inches behind the aft limit. After takeoff the left engine lost power. It lost altitude, banked abruptly to the left, nosed down and crashed into the ocean. It appeared that the fuel had been contaminated with water. On board were the pilot and 8 passengers, all were killed.
- On May 6, 2000, a Vieques Air Link pilot allegedly flew a company aircraft over Camp Garcia, a restricted US Navy area, on a scheduled flight an hour after protesters had been removed from the area by FBI agents and U.S. Marshals, resulting in the suspension of the pilot.
- On June 2, 2020, 2 people died and one was seriously injured when a Vieques Air Link Piper Aztec crashed against two sailboats at San Juan Bay. It's not clear which of the two San Juan airports the flight was heading to. This marked the first incident involving fatalities for the airline in almost 36 years.

== See also ==
- Transportation in Puerto Rico#Airlines based in Puerto Rico
- List of airports in Puerto Rico
