= Mona Airport =

Airstrip on Mona Island in Puerto Rico

- IATA: none; ICAO: none; LID: PR-0001

Summary
- Airport type: Permit required
- Owner: Department of Natural and Environmental Resources
- Location: Mona, Mayagüez, Puerto Rico
- Elevation AMSL: 1 ft / 0 m
- Coordinates: 18°04′38″N 067°55′57″W

Map
- Location in Puerto Rico

Runways
Direction	Length		Surface
Direction	ft	m	Surface
14/32	3,000	914	Sand
- Source: ourairports.com Google Maps

Mona Airport is an airstrip on Mona Island (Spanish: Isla de la Mona), the third largest island of Puerto Rico. Private and commercial flights require a permit for use of the landing strip. The permit can only be acquired through the Puerto Rico Department of Natural and Environmental Resources. The airport is also available to planes for emergency purposes.

Mona Island is a natural reserve and there are no permanent inhabitants. Rangers from the Department of Natural and Environmental Resources rotate residence on the island to manage visitors and take part in research projects.

The runway parallels the island's southwest shore. Approach and departures are over the water. An overrun to the northwest will hit some coral rock outcroppings.

The Mayaguez VOR/DME (Ident: MAZ) is located 45.8 nautical miles (52.7 mi) east-northeast of Mona Airport. The Punta Cana VOR/DME (Ident: PNA) is located in the Dominican Republic 39.2 nautical miles (45.1 mi) northwest of the airstrip.

== See also ==
- Transport in Puerto Rico
- List of airports in Puerto Rico
