= Patillas Airport =

Airport in Patillas, Puerto Rico

Patillas Airport Aeropuerto de Patillas
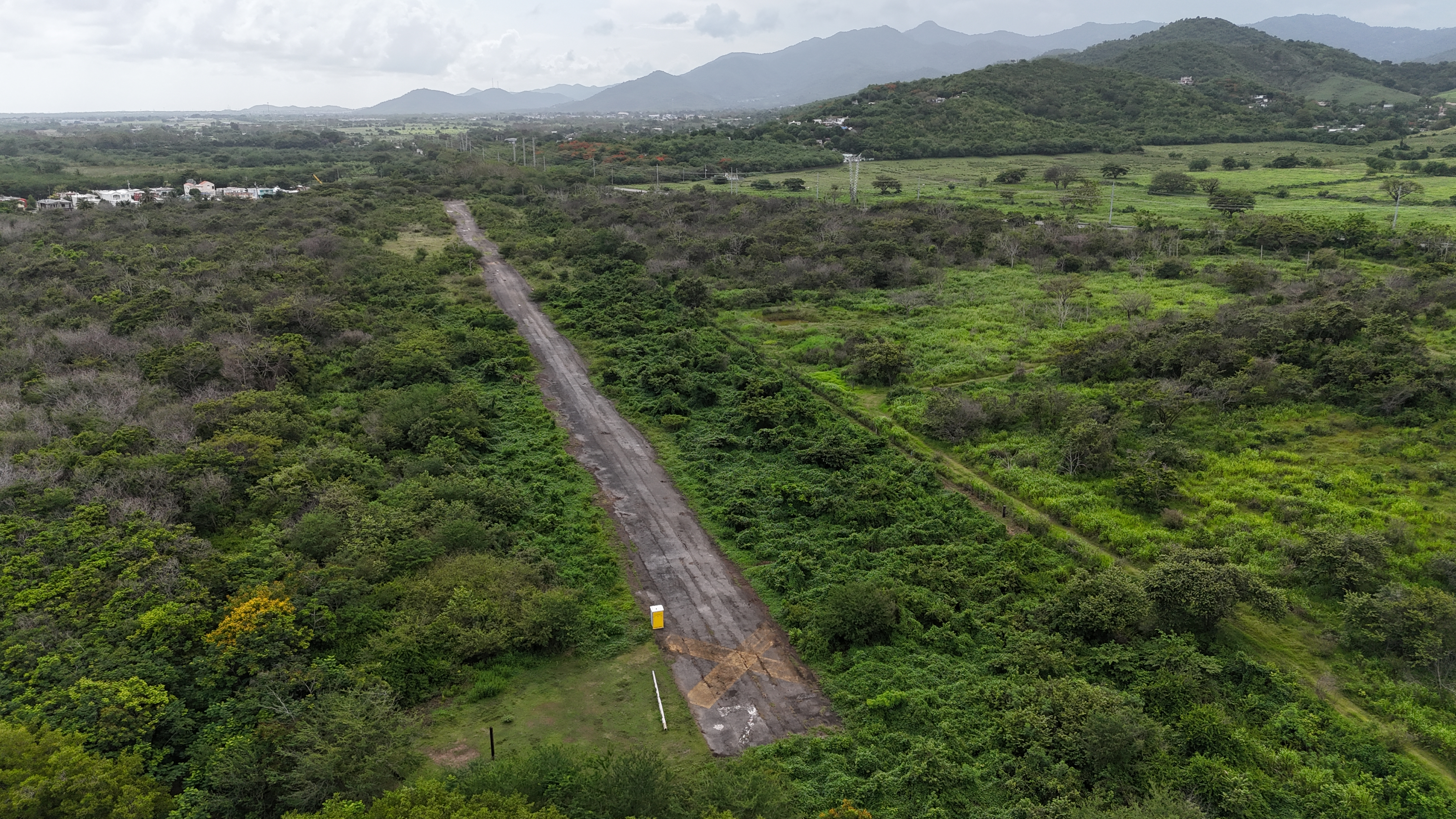
- The runway, viewed from above
- IATA: none; ICAO: none; FAA LID: X64

Summary
- Airport type: Closed
- Owner: Puerto Rico Ports Authority
- Location: Patillas, Puerto Rico
- Elevation AMSL: 10 ft (3.0 m)
- Coordinates: 17°58′56″N 66°01′10″W

Map
- Location in Puerto Rico

Runways
Direction	Length		Surface
Direction	ft	m	Surface
Closed	2,000	610	Asphalt Sources: Google Maps, FAA

Patillas Airport, (Spanish: Aeropuerto de Patillas) (FAA LID: X64) is a public airport 1.5 miles (2.4 km) south of the small town of Patillas, in Puerto Rico.

The airport is located on a 16-acre property owned by the Puerto Rico Ports Authority. The airport charges a non-commercial landing fee of an unspecified amount. For a 12-month period during operations lasting from July 15th, 1994 to July 15th, 1995, there were 2300 aircraft operations at the airport, with an average of 6 per day. There are 10 planes based out of Patillas at the time, 7 single-engine and 3 ultralight planes. The runway has a length of 2,000 feet (610 m) and a width of 50 feet (15 m).

== See also ==
- Transport in Puerto Rico
- List of airports in Puerto Rico
