= Benjamín Rivera Noriega Airport =

Airport in Culebra, Puerto Rico

Benjamín Rivera Noriega Airport Aeropuerto Benjamín Rivera Noriega
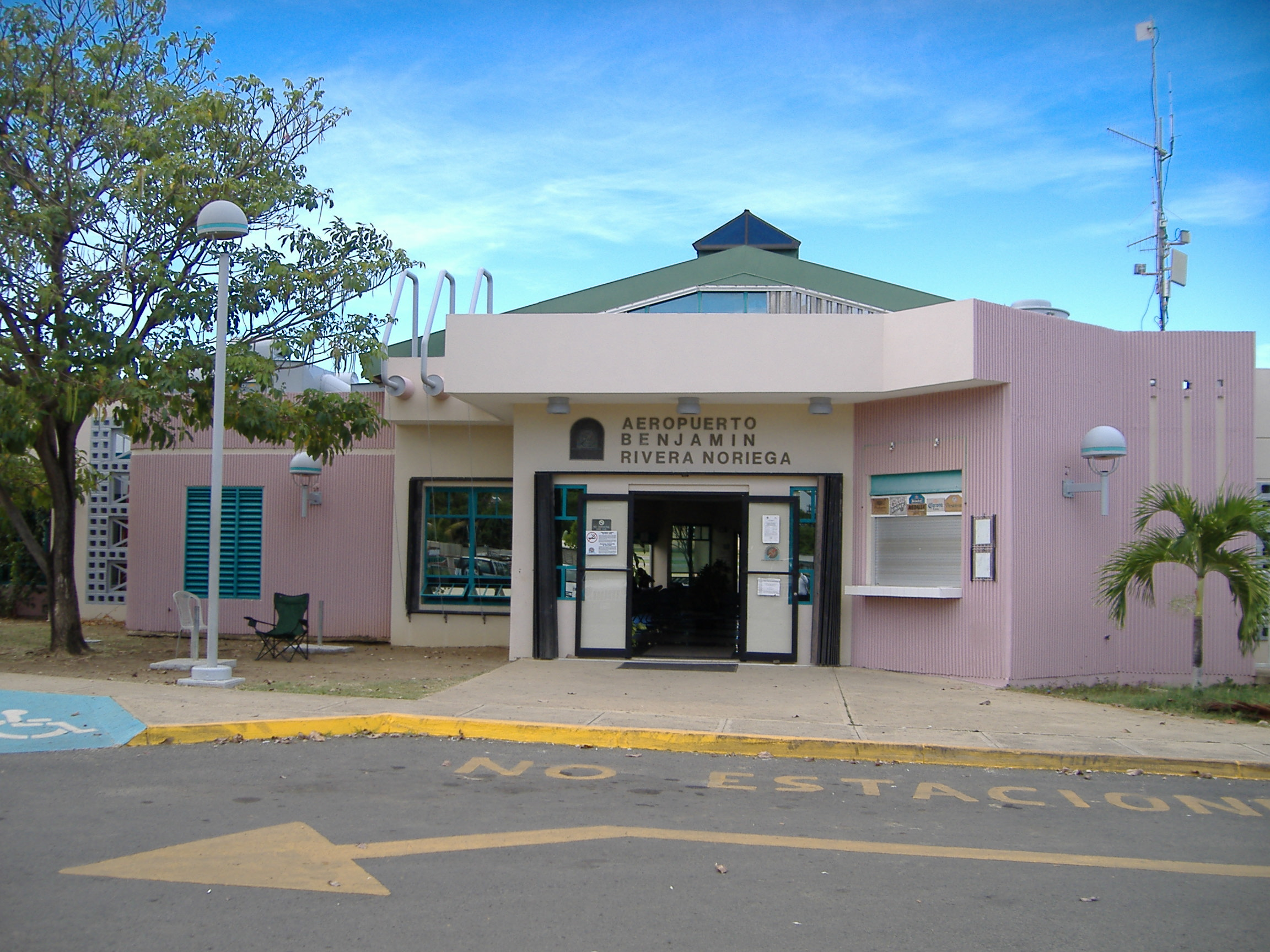
- Airport entrance, September 2007
- IATA: CPX; ICAO: TJCP; FAA LID: CPX

Summary
- Airport type: Public
- Owner/Operator: Puerto Rico Ports Authority
- Serves: Isla de Culebra, Puerto Rico
- Hub for: Culebra Air Services
- Elevation AMSL: 49 ft (15 m)
- Coordinates: 18°18′48″N 65°18′16″W

Map
- Location of airport in Puerto Rico

Runways
Direction	Length		Surface
Direction	ft	m	Surface
13/31	2,600	792	Asphalt
- Source: FAA GCM Google Maps

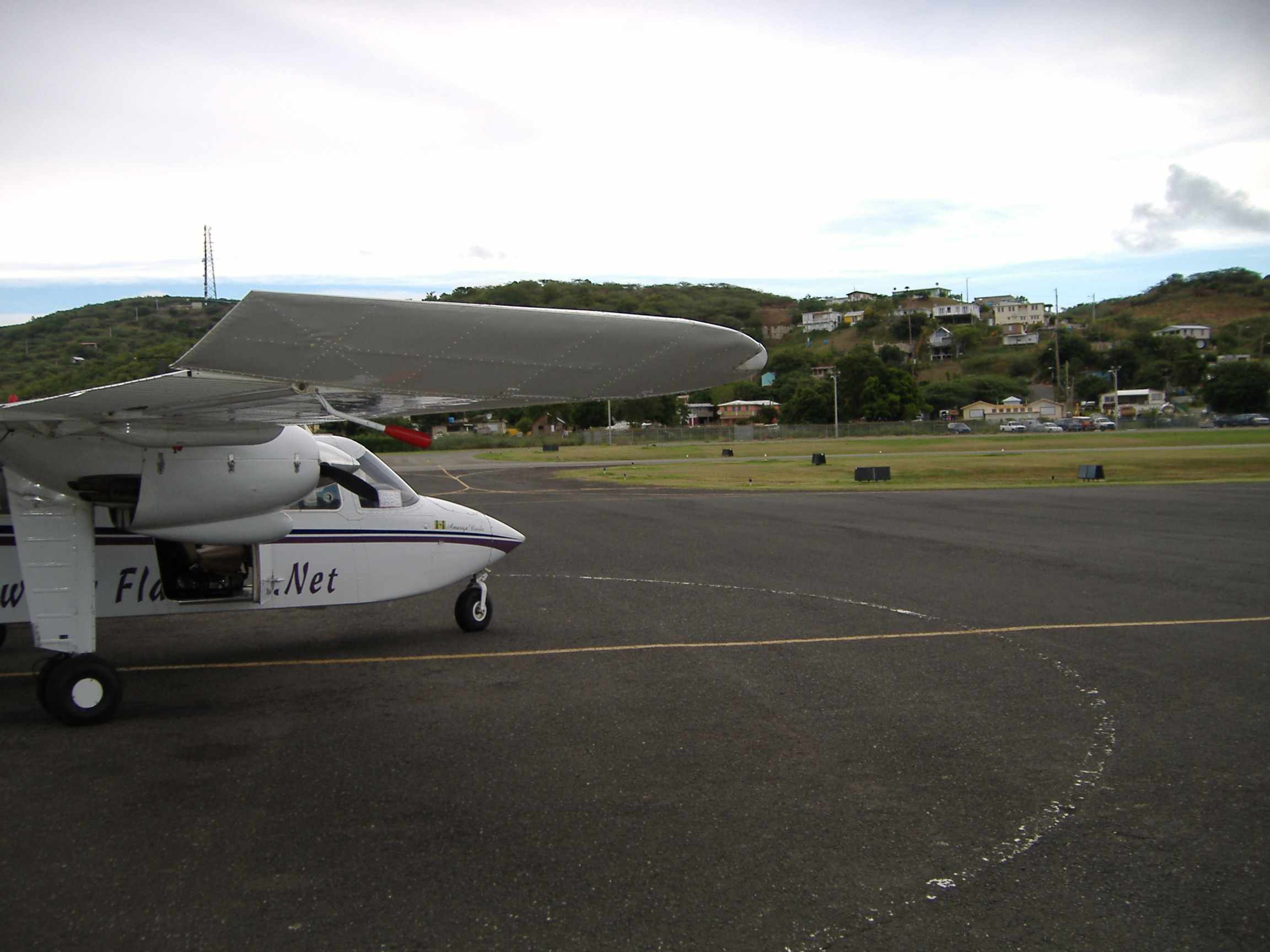
The airport has one paved runway.

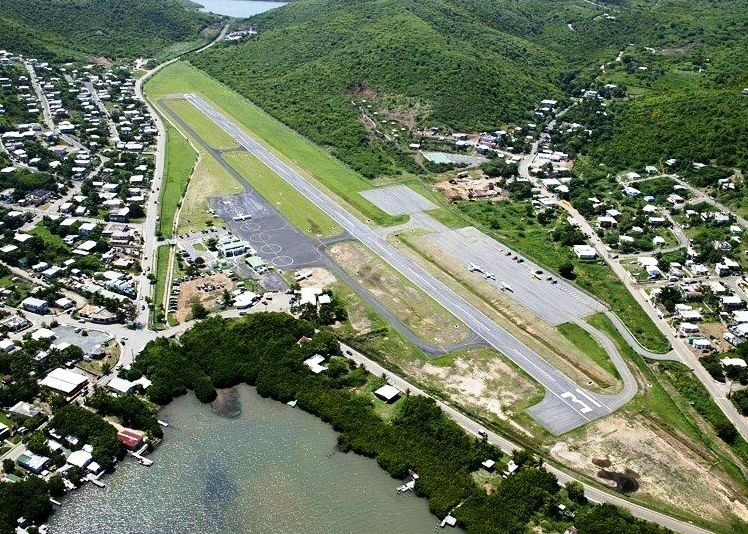
Aerial View of Airport

Benjamín Rivera Noriega Airport (IATA: CPX, ICAO: TJCP, FAA LID: CPX) is a public use airport on the island of Culebra in Puerto Rico. The airport is owned by the Puerto Rico Ports Authority. It is included in the National Plan of Integrated Airport Systems for 2011–2015, which categorized it as a general aviation airport. However, the airport does offer scheduled passenger service.

== History ==
The airport of Culebra was originally built as a military airport by the United States Marine Corps, opening in 1957. In 1965, the government of Puerto Rico started flying civilians from San Juan to the island with a Legislative compensation.

After the Navy-Culebra protests, the Puerto Rico Ports Authority started administering the civilian flight operations in Culebra, inaugurating the first passenger terminal on October 24, 1976. The airport and its 80 acres were officially transferred to the Ports Authority in 1980.

A new passenger terminal was inaugurated in 1994, and its name was changed to Benjamín Rivera Noriega, in honor of a pilot from Ciales. He became a community leader recognized by his service to the residents of Culebra.

== Facilities and aircraft ==
Benjamín Rivera Noriega Airport covers an area of 15 acres (6 ha) at an elevation of 49 feet (15 m) above mean sea level. It has one runway designated 13/31 with an asphalt surface measuring 2,600 by 50 feet (792 x 15 m).

The airport is noted for the mountain less than 1,000 feet (300 m) from the north end of the runway. This obstacle and the short length of the runway keep jet aircraft from using this airport. Commercial operations are currently limited to propeller aircraft with 10 seats or less. The approach to this airport is considered good practice for pilots before flying to Saint Barthélemy Airport.

The St Thomas VOR/DME (Ident: STT) is located 16.1 nautical miles (18.5 mi) east of the airport. The Roosevelt Roads TACAN (Ident: NRR) is located 19.9 nautical miles (22.9 mi) west-southwest of the airport.

== Airlines and destinations ==
Airlines	Destinations
Air Flamenco	Ceiba, San Juan–Isla Grande
Cape Air	San Juan–LMM, Vieques
Vieques Air Link	Ceiba, San Juan–Isla Grande, Vieques

=== Statistics ===
Carrier shares (December 2024 – November 2025)
Carrier	Passengers (arriving and departing)
Cape Air	14,000(38.58%)
Vieques	13,570(37.38%)
Air Flamenco	8,730(24.04%)

Top domestic destinations (December 2024 – November 2025)
Rank	City	Airport	Passengers
1	San Juan, Puerto Rico	San Juan–Muñoz Marín (SJU)	7,030
2	Ceiba, Puerto Rico	José Aponte de la Torre Airport (JRV)	5,640
3	San Juan, Puerto Rico	San Juan-Isla Grande (CPX)	4,540
4	Vieques, Puerto Rico	Antonio Rivera Rodríguez Airport (VQS)	420

== Incidents ==
On July 1, 2011, a Cessna 185 that took off from Benjamin Rivera Noriega airport with a family of five on board, registration number N8436Q, crashed while on its way to Mercedita Airport in Ponce. One body was found in Humacao. The other four passengers are presumed dead. The plane's wreckage was found immersed in water at the Atlantic Ocean, near Yabucoa.

== See also ==
- List of airports in Puerto Rico
- Transportation in Puerto Rico
