= Camp Garcia Vieques =

Defunct Marine Corps air station

Camp Garcia Vieques Airport
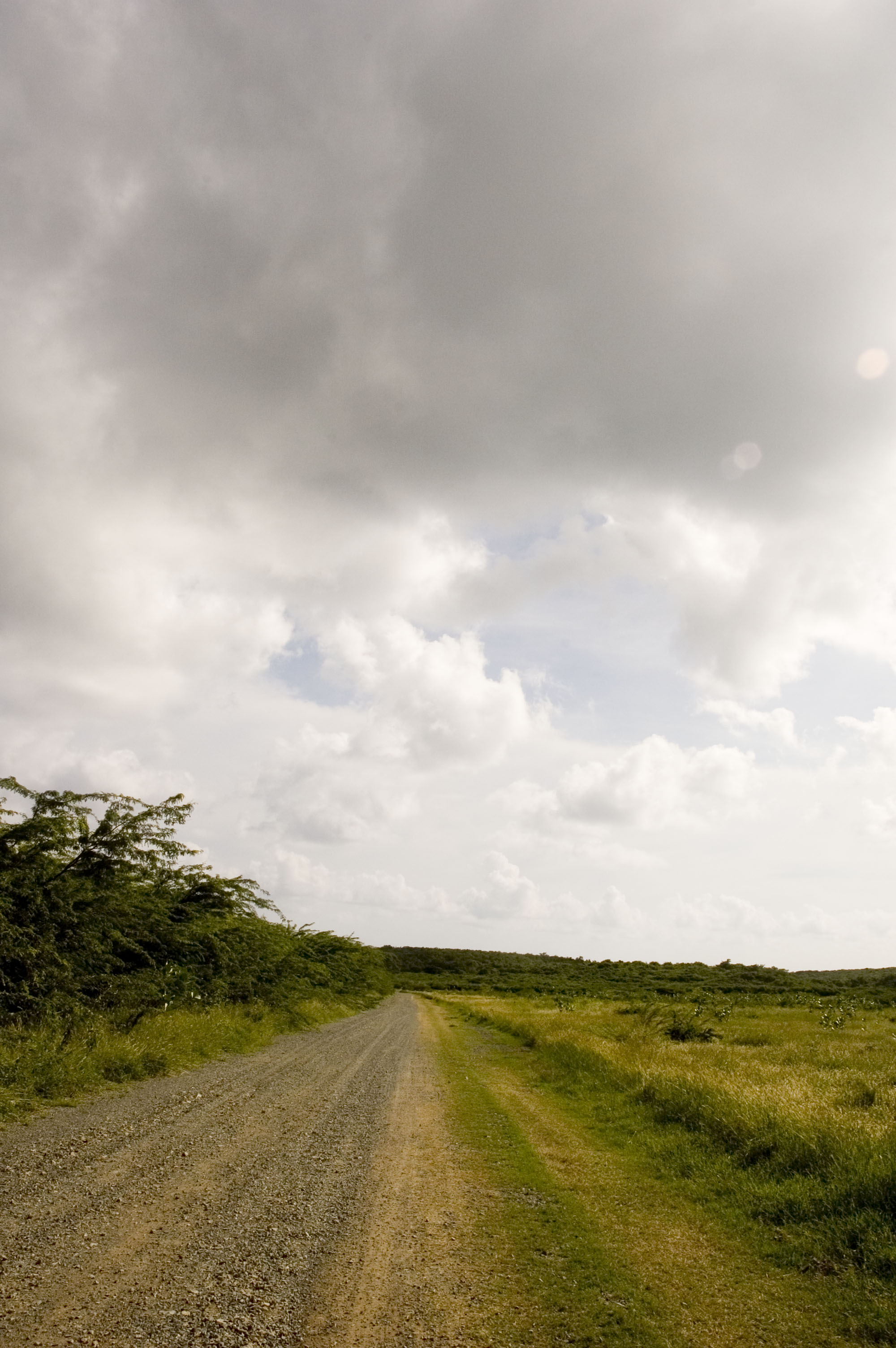
- IATA: none; ICAO: none

Summary
- Location: Vieques, Puerto Rico
- Coordinates: 18°06′57″N 065°25′22″W

Map
- Location in Puerto Rico

Runways
Direction	Length		Surface
Direction	ft	m	Surface
10/28	3,500	1,067	Paved

MCAS Vieques Airport was a Marine Corps Air Station (MCAS) at MCB Camp Garcia on the island-municipality of Vieques in Puerto Rico. It was built in 1960 by USMC engineers and consisted of a single 5,000 ft east–west runway. It was used to fly in troops, equipment and supplies to support amphibious landing training missions.

MCB Camp Garcia was a U.S. Marine Corps base, Camp Garcia Gate.

The base was used for amphibious landing training purposes. Camp Garcia hosted the Atlantic Fleet's Composite Training Unit Exercises and served as the premiere training area for the Atlantic Fleet for more than 60 years.

It also housed a MARS (Military Auxiliary Radio System) radio relay station.

Camp Garcia was named after Marine Corps Private 1st Class Fernando Garcia, a Medal of Honor recipient during the Korean War and a native of Puerto Rico. It was located on the island of Vieques (part of the Puerto Rico Commonwealth). The airport closed in 1978.
