= Puerto Rico Ports Authority =

Government-owned corporation of Puerto Rico

Agency overview
- Formed: March 19, 1955; 71 years ago
- Preceding agency: Puerto Rico Transport Authority
- Jurisdiction: Executive Branch
- Headquarters: San Juan, Puerto Rico
- Agency executive: Omar Marrero Díaz, Executive Director
- Parent department: Department of Transportation and Public Works
- Key document: Law No. 17 of 1955
- Website: www.prpa.pr.gov

The Puerto Rico Ports Authority (PRPA) (Spanish: Autoridad de los Puertos; AP) is a government-owned corporation of Puerto Rico charged with developing, operating, and overseeing all seaports and airports in Puerto Rico. The Authority is ascribed to the Department of Transportation and Public Works and is governed by a board of directors whose members are appointed by the Governor with the advice and consent of the Senate. Its day-to-day operations are under the charge of an executive director, currently Omar Marrero Díaz.

== Seaports overseen ==
Name	Municipality	Cardinality
Aguirre Port	Salinas	south
Port of Arecibo	Arecibo	north
Port of Ceiba	Ceiba	east
Port of Fajardo	Fajardo	east
Port of Guayanilla	Guayanilla	south
Port of Mayagüez	Mayagüez	west
Port of San Juan	San Juan	north
Port of Yabucoa	Yabucoa	southeast
Rafael Cordero Santiago Port of the Americas	Ponce	south

== Airports overseen ==
Name	Municipality	IATA
Antonio (Nery) Juarbe Pol Airport	Arecibo	ABO
Antonio Rivera Rodríguez Airport	Vieques	VQS
Benjamín Rivera Noriega Airport	Culebra	CPX
Eugenio María de Hostos Airport	Mayagüez	MAZ
Fernando Ribas Dominicci Airport	San Juan	SIG
Humacao Airport	Humacao	HUC
José Aponte de la Torre Airport	Ceiba	RVR
Luis Muñoz Marín International Airport	Carolina	SJU
Mercedita Airport	Ponce	PSE
Rafael Hernández Airport	Aguadilla	BQN

== Executive Directors ==
- 2017–present: Omar Marrero Díaz
