= Antonio Rivera Rodríguez Airport =

Airport on the island of Vieques in Puerto Rico

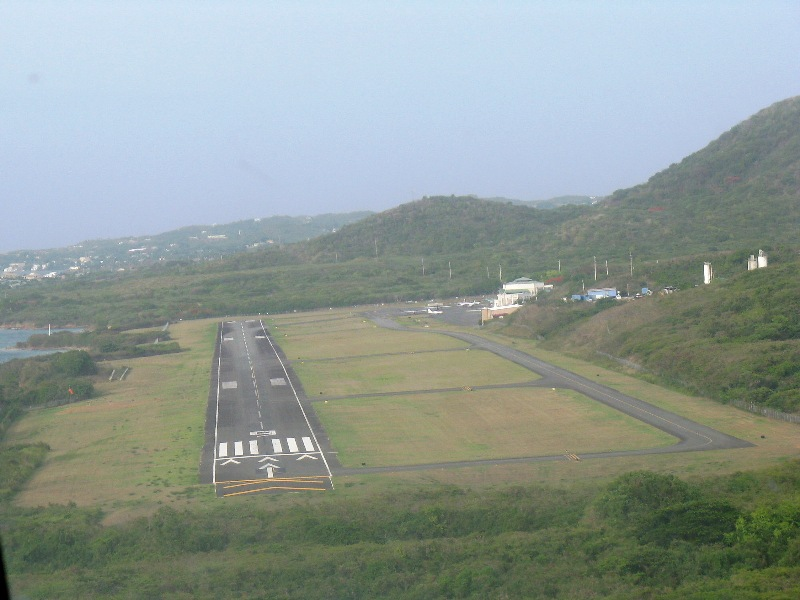
- IATA: VQS; ICAO: TJVQ; FAA LID: VQS

Summary
- Airport type: Public
- Owner: Puerto Rico Ports Authority
- Serves: Isla De Vieques, Puerto Rico
- Hub for: Vieques Air Link
- Elevation AMSL: 49 ft (15 m)
- Coordinates: 18°08′05″N 65°29′38″W

Map
- Location of airport in Puerto Rico

Runways
Direction	Length		Surface
Direction	ft	m	Surface
9/27	4,300	1,311	Asphalt
- Source: FAA GCM Google Maps

Antonio Rivera Rodríguez Airport (IATA: VQS, ICAO: TJVQ, FAA LID: VQS) is a public airport on the island of Vieques in Puerto Rico. Because a large amount of Vieques's yearly revenue comes from the tourism industry, this airport plays an important part in the Vieques economy. For decades, the airport has been the hub of Vieques Air Link, and also a destination for a number of small airlines.

It is included in the National Plan of Integrated Airport Systems for 2011–2015, which categorized it as a primary commercial service airport (more than 10,000 enplanements per year).

== History ==
When anti-military demonstrators started flocking into Vieques in 1999, Vieques Airport saw a considerable increase to its normal yearly average of passengers. In addition, many celebrities who travelled from all over Puerto Rico and the rest of Latin America to join the protesters arrived at Vieques through this airport. When Carla Tricoli, a Vieques native, won the 2002 Miss Puerto Rico contest, her first flight as a beauty queen landed at Vieques Airport.

The airport does not accept jet aircraft, but several international flights operate from it. Most of the commercial aviation operations are domestic flights such as to Ceiba, to Isla Grande Airport in San Juan, and to Luis Muñoz Marín International Airport in Carolina, a suburb of San Juan. Air ambulance flights to San Juan are also available.

Early in 2005, plans were announced to expand the airport's runway, so that the airport could accept flights by smaller jets. This would be done in preparation for American Eagle to start operations to the airport on behalf of American Airlines via a code sharing agreement. The airline was expected to start flights to Vieques from San Juan's Luis Muñoz Marín International Airport in early 2010; however, American Eagle decided not to begin service and then subsequently ceased all code sharing flights on behalf of American in the Caribbean.

== Facilities ==
Antonio Rivera Rodríguez Airport covers an area of 124 acres (50 ha) at an elevation of 49 feet (15 m) above mean sea level. It has one runway designated 9/27 with an asphalt surface measuring 4,300 by 75 feet (1,311 by 23 m).

== Airlines and destinations ==
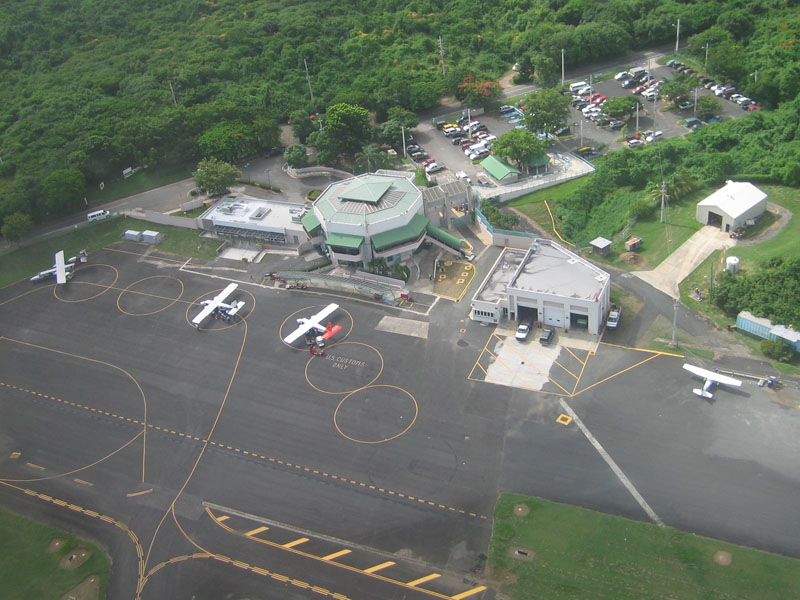
The airport's main building as seen from a departing airplane

Scheduled passenger service is provided by the following airlines:

Airlines	Destinations
Cape Air	Culebra, San Juan–LMM, St. Croix, St. Thomas
M&N Aviation	Charter: San Juan–Isla Grande
Vieques Air Link	Ceiba, Culebra, San Juan–Isla Grande

=== Statistics ===
Carrier shares (December 2024 – November 2025)
Carrier	Passengers (arriving and departing)
Vieques	41,940(62.90%)
Cape Air	24,740(37.10%)

Top domestic destinations (December 2024 – November 2025)
Rank	City	Airport	Passengers
1	San Juan, PR	Luis Muñoz Marín International Airport (SJU)	11,800
2	Ceiba, PR	José Aponte de la Torre Airport (JRV)	10,740
3	San Juan, PR	Fernando Luis Ribas Dominicci Airport (SIG)	9,030
4	Christiansted, VI	Henry E. Rohlsen Airport (STX)	540
5	Culebra, PR	Benjamín Rivera Noriega Airport (CPX)	390
6	Charlotte Amalie, VI	Cyril E. King Airport (STT)	200

== Accidents and incidents ==
- On December 19, 1977, a Britten-Norman BN-2 Islander operated by Vieques Air Link en route from St. Croix ditched off of Vieques due to fuel exhaustion. Five passengers of the 10 on board were killed.
- A Beechcraft A100 King Air which belonged to Padosa Productions-a musical label to which boy band Menudo belonged-crashed with 11 people on board, 2 crew members and nine passengers, on Wednesday, August 17, 1983. The plane was on a flight from Alexander Hamilton International Airport in St. Croix, U.S. Virgin Islands to Isla Verde International Airport in San Juan, with a stop-over at Vieques, when it confronted lifting problems on take-off from Vieques to San Juan, hitting citrus trees before it was able to stop. While there were no injuries reported, the airplane suffered substantial damage. It is unknown whether band director Edgardo Diaz or any of the band's members at the time (Johnny Lozada, Ricky Melendez, Charlie Masso, Ray Reyes and Roy Rossello) were in the plane when it crashed.
- Vieques Air Link Flight 901A – On August 2, 1984, a BN-2 Islander of Vieques Air Link crashed after take-off, killing all nine passengers and crew.

== See also ==
- Transport in Puerto Rico
- List of airports in Puerto Rico
