= Aviation in Puerto Rico =

Aviation in Puerto Rico has a complex and long history, almost as long as the history of aviation itself. Puerto Rican aviation history has been filled with events, well-known characters and airline companies which have shaped the country's transportation services and the way people travel between cities and to other countries.

== History of aviation in Puerto Rico ==
Before aviation became a popular means of travel in Puerto Rico, most Puerto Ricans and foreigners in the Puerto Rican archipelago did their travel to cities on the Puerto Rican islands by train (and sometimes by horse or carriages), except when boats were needed (such as travel to the island-cities of Culebra and Vieques) from around the 1870s to around 1926.

Félix Rigau Carrera, a Puerto Rican, became the first Hispanic pilot in the United States Marine Corps and is considered to be the first Puerto Rican airplane pilot.

During 1911, Ted Schrive and George Smith, two American pilots, landed an airplane in Puerto Rico, becoming the first two pilots to land a plane in the Caribbean country.

On February 2, 1928, American pilot Charles Lindbergh flew to San Juan on his Spirit of St. Louis airplane, as part of a goodwill tour through the Americas. He arrived from St. Thomas, United States Virgin Islands and took off on February 4 on a flight to Santo Domingo, Dominican Republic.

Clara Livingston, an American aviator, moved to her father's property in the town of Dorado during the 1930s, eventually receiving her friend Amelia Earhart at that property (see below). Ms. Livingston began flying for the Women's Army Corps and she made flights to Puerto Rico for the U.S. Army Air Corps, which led to her letting the Air Corps build an airport at her Dorado property, the Dorado Airport. Dorado Airport later became a commercial airport that received airline flights by Caribair and by Crown Air (later to become Dorado Wings). During the 2000s, Dorado Airport was bulldozed and an aviation-themed community park exists in the area now, which commemorates Ms. Livingston and the area's past as a commercial airport.

In 1936, ANPRI, later known as Puertorriqueña de Avíacion, started services from an airport in what later became Residencial Las Casas to other Puerto Rican cities (including some that lacked airports like Guanica and Guayama), and to other nearby islands, using a hydroplane for water landings.

By 1938, Dennis Powelson, who was a company pilot for the famed Don Q Puerto Rican rum brand, had established his own airline, Powelson Airlines (the later to be known as Caribair). The airline would provide Aerovías Nacionales (ANPRI) with stiff competition; from May 15 to May 21, 1938, the USPS organized a race between the two airlines in order to give the winning airline air mail routes. Aerovías Nacionales' airplane was not able to perform its duty and Felix Juan Serrallés Sanchez (1911-1985), who took off from Mercedita Airport in Ponce, won the race for the Powelson Airlines.

Pan American World Airways was operating services to the island using an air strip located in Isla Grande, San Juan, (near Cataño), late in the 1930s before, during World War II, the United States military decided to build an air station there, Naval Air Station Isla Grande. Shortly after the end of that war, in 1945, the air station, since known as Isla Grande airport, started getting used by other commercial airlines. Airlines such as Deutsche Luft Hansa, Iberia and Delta flew to Isla Grande airport.

In 1937, Amelia Earhart made a stop at Isla Grande airport, which had yet to be known by that name. Earhart spent the night at her friend Livingston's Dorado property.

In 1939, an air field was inaugurated in Aguadilla, at Puerto Rico's northwest coast. This air field would become the Ramey Air Force Base in 1948, and, later yet, in 1973, the Rafael Hernandez Airport.

Isla Grande airport handled propeller-driven aircraft that were in use during the 1930s and 1940s, but it was not prepared to receive jet aircraft such as the Boeing 707 that would become the staple of the fleets of many airlines worldwide in the up-coming years, so the Puerto Rican government began construction of a new airport, to be located in Isla Verde, a Carolina area near Carolina's city border with San Juan. The new airport, Isla Verde International airport, opened in 1954 with an inauguration address by governor Luis Muñoz Marin; it would be renamed after Marin in 1985, five years after his death. The Luis Muñoz Marin International airport allowed for jets such as Boeing 747, Douglas DC-10, Lockheed L-1011 Tri-Stars and others, such as Airbus A320, Boeing 727 and 737, etc. to land from North, Central and South America, Europe and other Caribbean countries in Puerto Rico, and thus, subsequently, additional airlines like Aerolineas Argentinas and KLM started services to the island.

Pan Am used Isla Verde airport as a hub; starting in 1969, Puerto Rico's unofficial flag carrier, Prinair, also used that airport as a hub, until it ceased operations in 1984. Prinair had started flying initially from Ponce Airport during 1966; it has restarted operations twice since it ceased flying in 1984 and as of 2022 was flying from Rafael Hernandez Airport in Aguadilla. Other airlines that have used Luis Muñoz Marin International airport as a hub include Eastern Airlines, American Airlines, JetBlue, Caribair, Aeronaves de Puerto Rico, Trans Caribbean Airways, Oceanair, Diaz Aviation (also known as Air Puerto Rico and by other names) and TWA.

Meanwhile, one year after Isla Verde Airport was inaugurated in the northern city of San Juan, to the south, at Puerto Rico's second largest city, the city of Ponce, Mercedita Airport was inaugurated in 1955. Mercedita airport became an international airport in 1990.

In 1983, Eastern Airlines opened a major terminal at Luis Muñoz Marin International Airport which it would use as a major operations center for Eastern's and Eastern Metro Express Airlines' operations from Puerto Rico to the United States and some Caribbean nations, and to domestic destinations in Puerto Rico. In 1987, American Airlines would obtain that terminal from Eastern and American and American Eagle Airlines used the terminal in the same role as Eastern had before.

During the early 1990s, a group of enthusiasts dedicated themselves to find one of Delta Airlines's five original DC-3s to restore it to flying conditions and found one, Delta Ship 41, (the airline's second DC-3) in Puerto Rico flying for Diaz Aviation (under the name Air Puerto Rico). Delta bought the airplane back and it was returned to the airline in June 1993. During 2018, Delta celebrated its 65th year of non-stop services to Puerto Rico, which had become the Latin American spot that had received Delta services non-stop for the longest time in the airline's history.

In February 2025, Governor Jennifer Gonzalez-Colón announced a request by the government of Puerto Rico for a permanent exemption from air cabotage laws in Puerto Rico.

== Commercial airports ==
Puerto Rico has a number of commercial airports located through the archipelago. Below is a list of those:

- Rafael Hernandez Airport in Aguadilla
- Jose Aponte de la Torre Airport in Ceiba
- Benjamin Rivera Noriega Airport in the island of Culebra.
- Eugenio Maria de Hostos Airport in Mayaguez
- Mercedita Airport in Ponce
- Fernando Ribas Dominicci Airport (Isla Grande Airport) in San Juan
- Luis Muñoz Marin International Airport in Carolina (next to San Juan)
- Antonio Rivera Rodríguez Airport in the island of Vieques

=== Closed commercial airports ===
- Dorado Airport in Dorado
- Diego Jiménez Torres Airport in Fajardo

=== Commercial airports no longer served by airlines ===
- Humacao Airport in Humacao

== Major accidents and incidents ==
Puerto Rico has been the scene of a number of aviation accidents and incidents. The following is a list of some of the most notable ones:

- A Douglas DC-2 of the USAAF crashed into a mountain in the city of Coamo on October 1, 1942, during a flight to Isla Grande air-strip, after taking off in Juana Diaz. All 22 occupants perished.
- Pan Am Flight 526A - 52 people were killed on April 11, 1952, when a Pan Am Douglas DC-4 airplane crashed minutes after taking off from Isla Grande on their way to Idlewild International Airport (now John F. Kennedy International Airport) in New York City, New York. 17 occupants survived.
- Prinair Flight 277: On March 5, 1969, a de Havilland Heron of Prinair, flying from St. Thomas, United States Virgin Islands, was attempting to land at the Isla Verde airport when it crashed into mountainous terrain near Luquillo, killing all 19 on board. An NTSB investigation found that an air traffic controller at the airport mistakenly thought the aircraft was near San Juan when it actually was near Fajardo instead.
- Prinair Flight 191: On 24 June 1972, Prinair Flight 191, flown on a DeHavilland DH-114 aircraft, which took off from Luis Muñoz Marín International Airport in San Juan, Puerto Rico, crashed while attempting to land at Mercedita Airport. Two crew and three passengers of the 20 on board died.
- 1972 Puerto Rico DC-7 crash: On December 31, 1972, baseball star Roberto Clemente and his companions died when their DC-7 crashed soon after takeoff from Isla Verde during a relief flight bound for Nicaragua. Neither the bodies of the victims (except for the pilot's) nor the plane's wreckage was ever found.
- 1977 Vieques Air Link crash: On December 19, 1977, five people died and five survived when a Vieques Air Link plane from St. Croix ditched at sea near Vieques when it was about to run out of fuel.
- Air Caribbean Flight 309: On September 26, 1978, an Air Caribbean airlines Beechcraft D185 passenger airplane was landing at Isla Verde airport from Rafael Hernandez Airport in Aguadilla, after a domestic flight, when it crashed into Barrio Obrero, near Residencial Las Casas, killing all 6 on board. The plane fell on top of a bar, injuring several bar clients, including mechanic Luciano Rivera. Wake turbulence from an Eastern Airlines L-1011 which was also landing was found to be the accident's main cause.
- American Eagle Flight 5452: An American Eagle CASA C-212 crashed while landing at Mayaguez on May 8, 1987, killing two and damaging the airport perimeter fence.
- American Eagle Flight 5456: On June 7, 1992, a CASA C-212 aircraft of American Eagle Airlines, flying from San Juan, crashed one mile short of runway 9 in Mayaguez, killing all five people on board.

== See also ==
- Aerospace industry in Puerto Rico
- Transportation in Puerto Rico
