= List of airlines of Puerto Rico =

This is a list of airlines which have an air operator's certificate issued by the Federal Aviation Administration of the United States.

Note:Destinations in bold indicate primary hubs, those in italic indicate secondary hubs, while those with regular font indicate focus cities.

Airline	Image	IATA	ICAO	Callsign	Hubs and focus cities	Founded	Notes
Air Flamenco		F4	WAF	FLAMENCO	**San Juan (International)**; Ceiba; Culebra; San Juan (Isla Grande); Vieques	1976	
Borinquen Air		FD; 3B	BNA		**San Juan (International)**	1960	
Culebra Air Services					**Culebra**; San Juan (International)	1998	
M&N Aviation					**San Juan (International)**	1992	
Merlin Express			MEI	MERIN EXPRESS	**Aguadilla**; Santiago de los Caballeros; Providenciales		
Prams Air						2005	
Prinair		PQ	PRU	COLOR BIRD	**San Juan (International)**	1966, 2007, 2019	
Pro-Air Services					**San Juan (International)**	1981	
San Juan Aviation		JI			**San Juan (International)**		
Seaborne Airlines		BB	SBS	SEABORNE	**San Juan (International)**; St. Croix; St. Thomas	1992	
Vieques Air Link		V4	VES	VIEQUES	**Vieques**	1965	

== See also ==
- List of airlines
- List of defunct airlines of Puerto Rico
