= Transportation in Puerto Rico =

Transportation in Puerto Rico includes a system of roads, highways, freeways, airports, ports and harbors, and railway systems, serving a population of approximately 4 million year-round. It is funded primarily with both local and federal government funds.

== Airports ==
Puerto Rico has a total of 30 airports (3 of which are international), including one in each of the smaller islands of Vieques and Culebra. The largest airport in terms of passenger traffic is Luis Muñoz Marín International Airport, and consists of two runways and three concourses. It is by far the busiest airport in Puerto Rico, with direct connections to most major cities in the mainland United States, Latin America, Canada, the Caribbean, and Spain.

- Puerto Rico has 21 airports with paved runways, of which:
  - 3 airports with more than 10,000 ft (3,048 m) of runway.
  - 3 airports with runways ranging between 5,000 ft (1,524 m) and 8,000 ft (2,438 m).
  - 15 airports with less than 5,000 ft (1,524 m) of runway.
- Puerto Rico also has 8 airports with unpaved runways, all of which have less than 5,000 ft (1,524 m) of runway.

=== Airlines based in Puerto Rico ===
The following are current and former passenger and cargo airlines based in Puerto Rico or with flights to Puerto Rico:

==== Historical ====
- Aeronaves de Puerto Rico (1982-1983)
- Aerovías Nacionales de Puerto Rico (1936)
- Puertorriqueña de Aviación (1941)
- Pan American World Airways
- Mexicana de Aviación
- Lufthansa
- Viasa
- Aerolíneas Argentinas
- KLM
- TWA
- Eastern
- Oceanair

==== Currently or recently operating/licensed ====
- Air Caribbean (defunct)
- Air Flamenco
- Dorado Wings (defunct)
- Executive Air (defunct)
- Fina Air (defunct)
- Isla Nena Air
- Roblex Aviation (defunct)
- San Juan Aviation
- Tol Air (defunct)
- Vieques Air Link
- American Airlines
- American Eagle
- Delta Air Lines
- Spirit Airlines
- JetBlue
- AirTran Airways (defunct)
- American Trans Air (defunct)
- United
- Continental (defunct, merged with United)
- Copa Airlines
- Insel Air (defunct)
- Iberia Airlines
- Virgin Atlantic
- US Airways (defunct, merged with American Airlines)
- PAWA Dominicana (defunct)
- Southwest Airlines
- Volaris
- Norwegian Air Shuttle
- FedEx Express
- Cargolux
- CAL Cargo Airlines
- Martinair
- Prinair

== Seaports & harbors ==
Sea-based transportation of any merchandise or persons shipped entirely or even partly by water between U.S. points—either directly or indirectly via one or any number of foreign points—U.S. Federal Law requires that said items or persons must travel in U.S.-built, U.S.-crewed, U.S.-citizen owned vessels that are U.S.-documented by the Coast Guard for such maritime "cabotage" carriage. This transportation/trade restriction includes Puerto Rico under the Jones Act of 1920 (Merchant Marine Act of 1920). The Jones Act and various other United States laws that govern the domestic and domestic-foreign-domestic transportation of merchandise and passengers by water between two points in the United States, including Puerto Rico, have been extended to that island-territory since the initial years of United States' political relations. Currently, the only providers who ship from the United States to Puerto Rico are Crowley Maritime, TOTE Maritime, and Trailer Bridge.

Strictly construed, the Jones Act refers only to Section 27 of the Merchant Marine Act of 1920, (46 U.S.C. § 883; 19 CFR 4.80 and 4.80(b)), which has come to bear the name of its original sponsor, Sen. Wesley L. Jones. Another law that was enacted in 1886 requires essentially the same standards for the transport of passengers between U.S. points, directly or indirectly transported through foreign ports or foreign points (46 App. U.S.C. 289; 19 CFR 4.80(a)). However, since the mid-1980s, as part of a joint effort between the cruise ship industry that serves Puerto Rico and Puerto Rican politicians such as then Resident Commissioner, U.S. non-voting Representative Baltasar Corrada del Río, obtained a limited-exception since no U.S. cruise ships that were Jones Act-eligible were participating in said market.

The application of these coastwise shipping laws and their imposition on Puerto Rico consist in a serious restriction of free trade and have been under scrutiny and controversy due to the apparent contradictory rhetoric involving the United States Government's sponsorship of free trade policies around the world, while its own national shipping policy (cabotage law) is essentially mercantilist and based on notions foreign to free-trade principles.

=== Major ports ===
- San Juan Port - Mainly divided in three: one in Old San Juan which includes cargo/freight and cruise ships, the Pan American Port Terminal in Isla Grande section mostly for cruise ships, and Puerto Nuevo Bay, exclusively for freight/cargo ships the belong to Guaynabo City not to San Juan. It is the main port of the island.
- Port of Ponce - The second largest port in Puerto Rico and can handle both freight/cargo and cruise ships. It is currently undergoing a significant expansion (see Port of the Americas), with plans to convert it to an international shipping hub.
- Port of Mayagüez - The third largest port in Puerto Rico. It is mainly used for freight/cargo ships but is also home to the Dominican Republic-Puerto Rico passenger ferry and has also been used for cruise ships.

In July 2025, is confirmed by the Department of Puerto Rico, the creation of an interactive map of the logistics and freight ecosystem in Puerto Rico, a tool that aims to centralize information on the sector and position the island as a competitive logistics hub on a global scale, compared to other leading jurisdictions in Latin America, Europe and Asia.

=== Minor ports and harbors ===
The following are minor ports and harbors used for small freight/cargo ships, fishing vessels, and private boats/yachts: Guánica, Guayanilla, Guayama, Fajardo, Culebra, and Vieques.

There are ferries between Ceiba-Culebra and Ceiba-Vieques; between San Juan and Cataño; and between Ponce and Caja de Muertos (Coffin Island).

There are several private marinas in Puerto Rico for boats and yachts, the largest being Puerto del Rey in Fajardo and Club Naútico de Ponce.

=== Federal restrictions ===
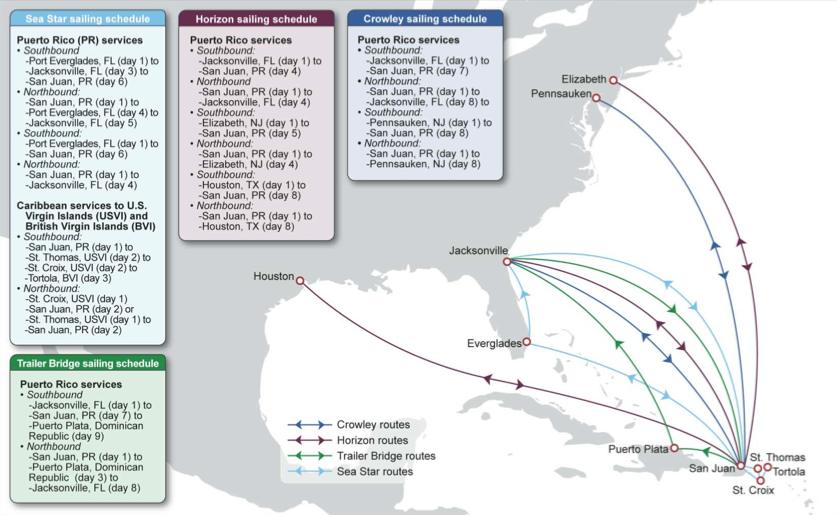
Map of Jones Act carrier routes for Puerto Rico.

The Merchant Marine Act of 1920 (also known as the Jones Act) prevents foreign-flagged ships from carrying cargo between two American ports (a practice known as cabotage). (Note: Gutierrez. "Mr. Chairman, we are here to express our support for any effort that would unburden the economy of the Commonwealth of Puerto Rico from the unfair and unreasonable restrictions that stem from dispositions of the Merchant Marine Acts of 1920 and 1936 on trade conducted between the Commonwealth and the United States mainland.") (Note: Gutierrez. "Being treated as an extension of the United States coastline by the protectionist merchant marine statutes has imposed a heavy and unfair cost on United States citizens in Puerto Rico.") (Note: Gutierrez. "The Merchant Marine Acts inflict costs to the Puerto Rican economy.") (Note: JOC (2013) "Repealing or amending the Jones Act cabotage law might cut Puerto Rico shipping costs") (Note: JOC (2013) "The GAO report said its interviews with shippers indicated they [...] believed that opening the trade to non-U.S.-flag competition could lower costs.") Because of the Jones Act, foreign ships inbound with goods from Central and South America, Western Europe, and Africa cannot stop in Puerto Rico, offload Puerto Rico-bound goods, load mainland-bound Puerto Rico-manufactured goods, and continue to U.S. ports. Instead, they must proceed directly to U.S. ports, where distributors break bulk and send Puerto Rico-bound manufactured goods to Puerto Rico across the ocean by U.S.-flagged ships. (Note: Gutierrez. "The "cabotage" laws impose significant restrictions on commerce between Puerto Rico and the U. S. mainland by requiring that merchandise and produce shipped by water between U.S. ports be shipped only on U.S.-built, U.S.- crewed, U.S.-flagged, and U.S.-citizen owned vessels.")

Puerto Rican consumers ultimately bear the expense of transporting goods again across the Atlantic and Caribbean Sea on U.S.-flagged ships subject to the extremely high operating costs imposed by the Jones Act. (Note: Gutierrez. "Because such restrictions boost shipping costs, American consumers pay the price.") This also makes Puerto Rico less competitive with Caribbean ports as a shopping destination for tourists from home countries with much higher taxes (like mainland states) even though prices for non-American manufactured goods in theory should be cheaper since Puerto Rico is much closer to Central and South America, Western Europe, and Africa.

The local government of Puerto Rico has requested several times to the U.S. Congress to exclude Puerto Rico from the Jones Act restrictions without success. (Note: Santiago (2021) "Local detractors of the Jones Act [...] for many years have unsuccessfully tried to have Puerto Rico excluded from the law's provisions[...]") The most recent measure has been taken by the 17th Legislative Assembly of Puerto Rico through R. Conc. del S. 21. These measures have always received support from all the major local political parties. In 2013 the Government Accountability Office published a report which concluded that "repealing or amending the Jones Act cabotage law might cut Puerto Rico shipping costs" and that "shippers believed that opening the trade to non-U.S.-flag competition could lower costs." The report, however, concluded that the effects of modifying the application of the Jones Act for Puerto Rico are highly uncertain for both Puerto Rico and the United States, particularly for the U.S. shipping industry and the military preparedness of the United States.

In February 2025, Governor Jennifer Gonzalez-Colón announced a request by the government of Puerto Rico for a permanent exemption from air cabotage laws in Puerto Rico.

== Rail transportation ==
=== Current systems ===
- Tren Urbano - Provides passenger train service between various points of the San Juan Metropolitan Area, between Bayamón, Guaynabo and several important sections of San Juan.
- Port of Ponce Railroad - The only industrial railroad operating on the entire island and located within the Puerto de Las Américas in Ponce, Puerto Rico. It consists of a small railroad yard and a railroad ferry terminal. About twice monthly, the railroad ferry transports tanker cars on a barge between Mobile, Alabama and the Ponce rail terminal, delivering chemicals for Puerto Rico's pharmaceutical industry.
- Tourism Railroads - Several locomotives are used for tourism and recreational services, such as "El Parque del Tren" in Bayamón (demolished to make way for the Tren Urbano) and the historic narrow gauge old sugarcane plantation "Tren del Sur" in Arroyo (currently abandoned but with plans for restoration).

=== Defunct systems ===
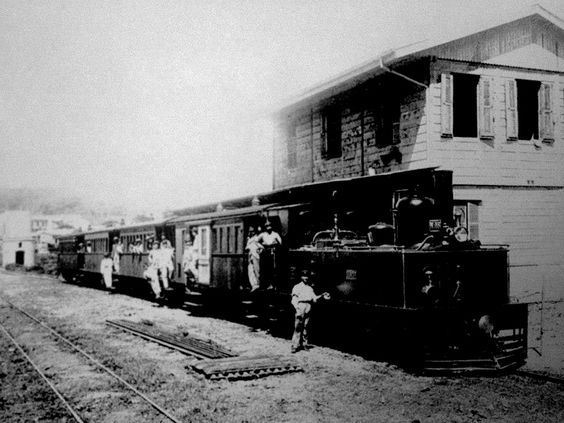
19th century train station in Yauco

The Puerto Rico train system flourished during the late 19th and early 20th century due to a large sugar cane industry there. Most, if not all, of these system were privately owned. Vieques, an island-municipality, also had the system connecting its sugar cane plantations.

During the 1870s and 1890s, Puerto Rico did not have a national railroad system, but the city of Mayagüez did have a small passenger rail system for transporting its residents mainly along the Mendez Vigo Avenue.

The main system can be traced back to 1891, when the northern line was built between San Juan (Martín Peña sector) and Manatí. The system was expanded to include all the western coastal towns, providing a link which would allow passengers to travel between the northern and southern parts of the island in less than a day for the first time in its history. Before its downfall, the Puerto Rico railroad system operated in all major cities, with tracks and stations along most of the coastal towns and direct lines to all major sugar refineries.

However, when Puerto Rico changed its mostly agricultural economy to an industrialized one, and the U.S. and Puerto Rican governments started investing heavily in interstate highways and freeways, the railroad business soon collapsed. Passenger travel ceased in 1953, while the commercial train system (mostly for the sugar cane industry) continued operating until 1957.

== Road transportation ==
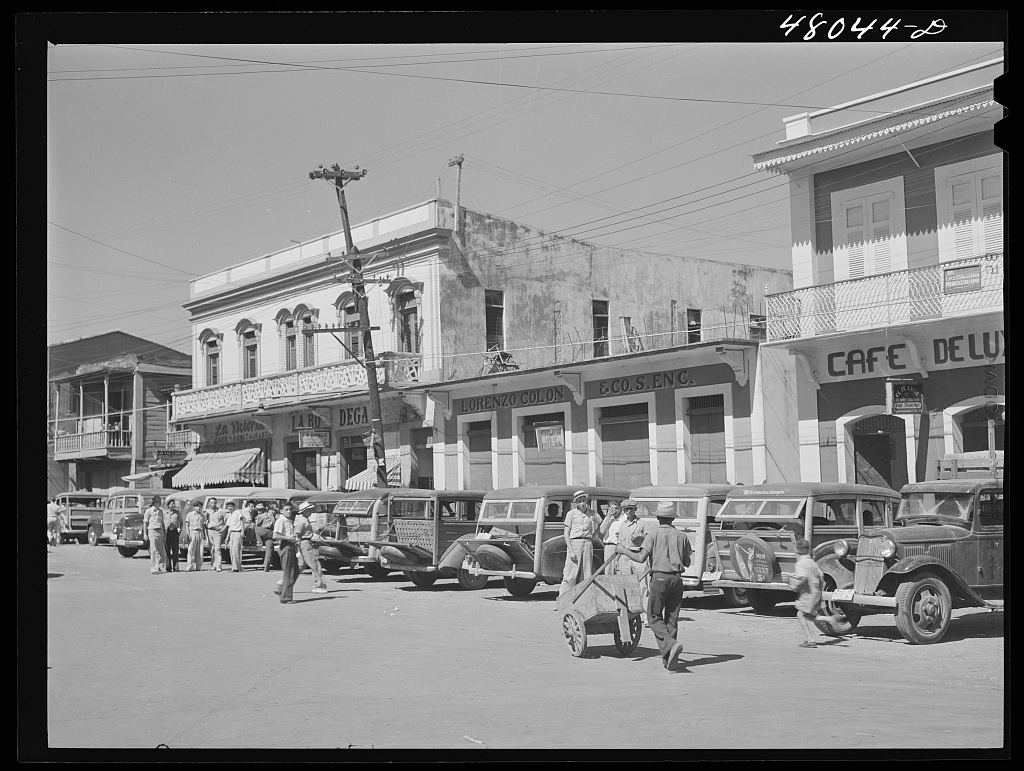
A row of station wagons or publicos waiting for loads and passengers in Arecibo, Puerto Rico, in January 1942.

Puerto Rico Interstates

Puerto Rico has an extensive system of roads and highways featuring tolled freeways (autopistas). Some are designated as Interstate Highways; although these routes do not connect to the contiguous United States, and are unsigned as such, they still receive funding in a similar fashion to the other Interstates on the U.S. mainland. In total, there are more than 8,950 miles (14,400 km, 1999 est.) of paved road. Some of the major highways are:

- PR-1 - Original main road between San Juan and Ponce before the completion of PR-52. It is now mostly used by people living nearby and as a scenic route.
- PR-2 - Main freeway/highway/urban primary highway between/through Ponce, Mayagüez, Aguadilla, and Arecibo. Original main highway between Arecibo and San Juan before completion of PR-22 (currently undergoing a conversion to a freeway between Ponce and Mayagüez). This is the longest road in Puerto Rico.
- PR-3 - (65th Infantry Avenue) Original main highway/urban primary highway between/through Salinas, Guayama, Humacao, Fajardo and San Juan (before completion of PR-52, PR-53, PR-66, and PR-26).
- PR-22 - Main freeway between San Juan and Hatillo (plans are under way to extend the freeway to Aguadilla).
- PR-52 (Las Américas Expressway and/or Luis A. Ferré Expressway) - Main freeway between San Juan and Ponce.
- PR-10 - Main highway between Ponce and Arecibo (Currently under construction. The final section between Adjuntas and Utuado was scheduled to open in 2015).
- PR-53 - Main freeway between Salinas, Guayama, Yabucoa, Humacao and Fajardo (currently under construction: section between Salinas and Guayama and Humacao to Fajardo are complete and open; while section between Guayama, Yabucoa and Humacao are currently under construction).
- PR-66 - Main freeway between Canóvanas, Carolina, San Juan, and Río Grande.

== Urban transportation ==
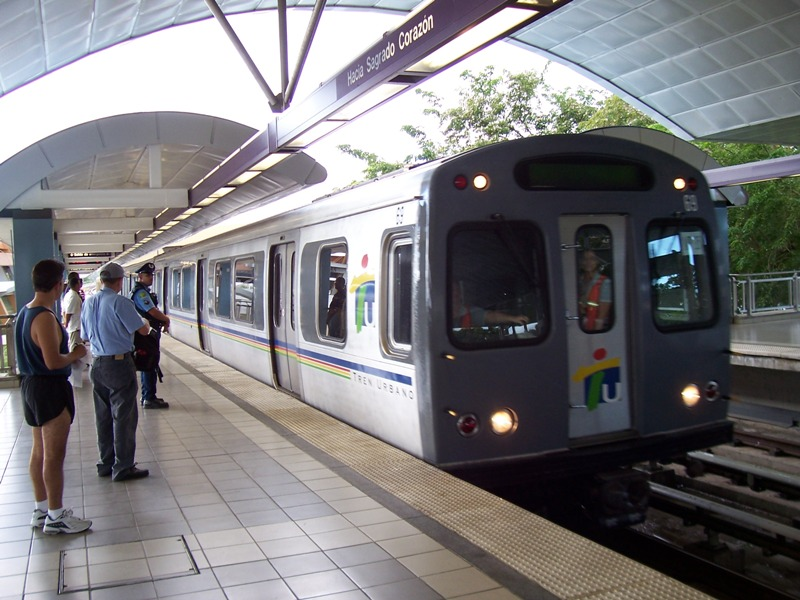
Tren Urbano at Bayamón Station

Transportation in Puerto Rico is heavily dependent on automobile transportation. Nevertheless, the government has increased investment in public transportation in an attempt to decrease vehicle dependency and road congestion. The island's metro area is serviced with three major public transportation systems:

- The 10.7 mile (17.2 km) metro system called "Tren Urbano" with a total of 16 stations. The project, which began operations in late 2004 cost a total of $2.25 billion and was more than $1 billion over budget and four years late. However, the "subsidized" Tren Urbano has received far less ridership than was originally projected and has failed to make a significant impact on reducing the island's metropolitan area traffic.
- A daily ferry service known as the Cataño Ferry, (La Lancha de Cataño in Spanish) which operates a route across San Juan Bay between Old San Juan and the municipality of Cataño.
- Metropolitan Bus Authority (Autoridad Metropolitana de Autobuses or AMA in Spanish) provides daily bus transportation to residents of San Juan, Guaynabo, Bayamón, Trujillo Alto, Cataño, and Carolina through 30 different routes. Its fleet consists of 277 regular buses and 35 buses for handicapped persons, and its ridership is estimated at 3,800 on work days.

Most cities and towns also have a Jitney-type taxi system locally called Carros Públicos. Each town has a central taxi terminal usually within walking distance of the town's central plaza where taxis are stationed, and they provide transportation through local and islandwide routes. In February 2014, the islandwide system of Carros Públicos consisted of over 3,000 vehicles authorized by the "Comisión de Servico Público" (Public Service Commission), and it covered almost 500 routes. At approximately 130,000 passengers per day, in 2014 the Públicos system handled over five times the daily passenger volume of the island's largest international airport, the Luis Muñoz Marín.

== See also ==
- T.U.S.C.A.
