= List of defunct airlines of Puerto Rico =

This is a list of defunct airlines of Puerto Rico.

Airline	Image	IATA	ICAO	Callsign	Commenced operations	Ceased operations	Notes
Air Caribbean					1975	1979	
Caribair		CB	CRB		1939	1973	Acquired by Eastern Air Lines
Dodita Air Cargo					1990	2006	
Dorado Wings					1964	1982	Purchased and renamed Crown Air
Executive Airlines		OW	EGF	EAGLE FLIGHT	1979	2013	
Fina Air					2003	2005	
Four Star Air Cargo		HK	FSC	FOUR STAR	1982	2009	
Oceanair		TJ			late 1970s	mid-1980s	
Puertorriqueña de Aviación					1936	1941	
Roblex Aviation					1997	2011	
Sundance Air					1986	1989	
Tol Air		TI	TOL	TOL AIR	1981	2006	

== See also ==
- List of airlines of Puerto Rico
- List of airports in Puerto Rico
