= Coral Air =

Airline from the U.S. Virgin Islands

Coral Air (IATA code: VY) was an airline from the United States Virgin Islands, based in St. Croix. It flew from February 1980 (45 years ago) to 1985 (40 years ago), serving Isla Verde International Airport in San Juan, Puerto Rico as well as Tortola, Nevis and St. Kitts from Alexander Hamilton Airport, St. Croix. It was owned by J.S. Jervis.

At one point, Coral Air received GAF Nomad and Shorts SD-330 aircraft, the latter of which allowed the airline to employ flight attendants for their relatively short flights. These aircraft were leased.

Eventually, the GAF Nomads were returned to lessor Hughes Aviation Services of the United States. Coral Air was then left with two aircraft, an SD-330 and a Britten Norman Islander. Lessors increased the rate of the SD-330's lease, so that aircraft was returned too.

In 1981, Coral Air filed a petition for reorganization under the Bankruptcy Act. It was rejected during August 6 of 1982, but, at that same date, the courts accepted a secondary plan submitted by the airline and a shell corporation named Sun Rae, which never became an actual corporation. Coral Air was then reorganized under the direction of Carol Rae Culliton, Harold M. Cohen and Joseph H. Jaffe, allowing the airline to fly for three more years.

== See also ==
- Aero Virgin Islands
- Prinair
