= Aeronaves de Puerto Rico =

Airline of Puerto Rico

Aeronaves de Puerto Rico was a short-lived Puerto Rican airline company which operated from November 1982 to 1983. The airline was initially certified to fly between Rafael Hernandez Airport in Aguadilla and the United States city of Newark, New Jersey. Later on, flights were begun from Luis Munoz Marin International Airport in San Juan to John F. Kennedy International Airport in New York, New York, using a Boeing 707 jet.

The airline's trademark, consisting of a local coqui frog inside a circle, was first filed on November 10, 1982.

An unsuccessful attempt at reviving Aeronaves with the slightly changed name of "Aeronaves de P.R." was made during 2003, and the airline has not been revived since.

== Destinations ==
| City | Country | IATA | ICAO | Airport | Refs |
|---|---|---|---|---|---|
| Aguadilla, Puerto Rico | Puerto Rico | BQN | TJBQ | Rafael Hernandez Airport | |
| San Juan | Puerto Rico | SJU | TJSJ | Luis Muñoz Marín International Airport | |
| Newark | United States | EWR | KEWR | Newark Liberty Airport | |
| New York | United States | JFK | KJFK | John F. Kennedy International Airport | |

== Fleet ==
- Boeing 707

== See also ==
- Air Caribbean
- Caribair
- Diaz Aviation
- Dorado Wings
- Oceanair
- Prams Air
- Prinair
- Puertorriqueña de Aviación
- Vieques Air Link

=== Airlines with a similar name ===
- Aeronaves de México
- Aeronaves del Perú
- Aeronaves del Sureste
- Aeronaves Dominicanas
- Aeronaves TSM
