= Aerospace industry in Puerto Rico =

The aerospace industry in Puerto Rico is a growing sector of the island's economy. It encompasses a wide range of activities, from manufacturing aircraft parts and components to research and development of new technologies. The industry benefits from Puerto Rico's strategic location, workforce, and government incentives.

== History ==
The aerospace industry in Puerto Rico has its roots in the 1950s, when the U.S. military established bases on the island. These bases attracted major aerospace companies, such as Pratt & Whitney and Honeywell, which set up operations to support military aircraft.

The Puerto Rico Aerospace and Defense (A+D) industry emerged in the early 1990s with Hamilton Sundstrand's acquisition of an existing manufacturer. Subsequent mergers saw Collins Aerospace and Pratt & Whitney become subsidiaries of Raytheon Technologies. In 2007, the industry took flight with major investments from Honeywell Aerospace and Lockheed Martin, both recruiting local engineering and IT talent. Honeywell grew substantially, building a world-class laboratory in Moca. AXON Puerto Rico (now DXC Technologies) arrived in 2010, employing hundreds. 2014 marked a historic agreement with Lufthansa Technik, establishing the first Americas maintenance, repair, and overhaul facility for the German company, with Avenger Aerospace Solutions providing testing and engineering support. Today, the industry continues to diversify and attract subsectors like research and development, space, and aircraft maintenance, solidifying its role as a strategic and emerging sector for Puerto Rico.

Several industrial parks dedicated to aerospace manufacturing were created, such as the Aguadilla International Airport and the Punta Salinas Industrial Complex.

== Current status ==
Major aerospace companies with operations in Puerto Rico include:

- Honeywell Aerospace
- Collins Aerospace
- Pratt & Whitney
- L3Harris Technologies
- UTC Aerospace Systems

These companies manufacture a wide range of aircraft parts and components, including engines, landing gear, and avionics. In addition to manufacturing, Puerto Rico is also home to a growing number of research and development facilities. These facilities are working on cutting-edge technologies, such as unmanned aerial vehicles (UAVs) and satellite systems.

There are currently proposals to create a spaceport at the Ceiba airport.

== Challenges and opportunities ==
The Puerto Rican aerospace industry faces a number of challenges, including competition from other countries with lower labor costs. However, the industry also has a number of advantages, such as its proximity to the U.S. market, its skilled workforce, and its government incentives. The Puerto Rican government is supporting the growth of the aerospace industry, and it has implemented a number of programs to attract investment and create jobs.

== See also ==
- Aviation in Puerto Rico
- Transportation in Puerto Rico
- List of airports in Puerto Rico
