= Puerto Rico Wing Civil Air Patrol =

Puerto Rican and US Virgin Islands auxiliary wing of U.S. Air Force

Associated branches
- United States Air Force

Command staff
- Commander: Col Ruben Hernandez
- Deputy Commander: Lt Col Samuel Rivera
- Chief of Staff: Lt Col Luis Herrera
- Senior Enlisted Leader: CMSgt Evaristo López

Current statistics
- Cadets: 700
- Seniors: 400
- Total Membership: 1100
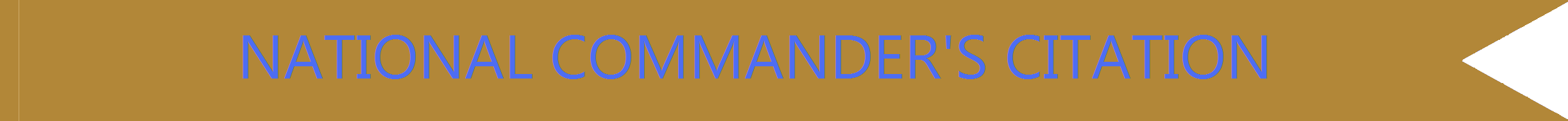
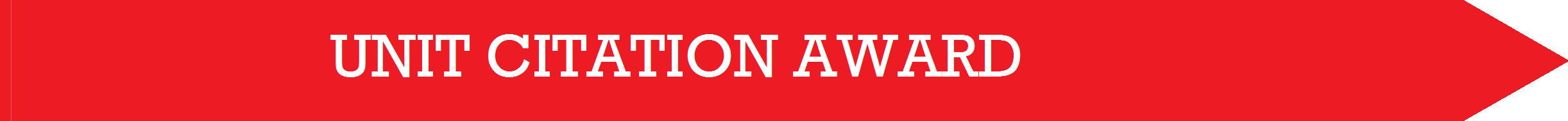
- Awards: National Commander's Unit Citation Unit Citation (5)
- Website: prwg.cap.gov
- Statistics as of January 2026

The Puerto Rico Wing of the Civil Air Patrol (CAP) –Spanish: Ala de Puerto Rico Patrulla Aérea Civil– is the highest echelon of Civil Air Patrol in the territories of Puerto Rico and the U.S. Virgin Islands. Puerto Rico Wing headquarters are located in San Juan, Puerto Rico. The Puerto Rico Wing consists of over 700 cadet and adult members at 28 locations across the island. Puerto Rico Wing was activated on November 22, 1949.

== Mission ==
The Puerto Rico Wing performs the three primary missions of the Civil Air Patrol: providing emergency services; offering cadet programs for youth; and providing aerospace education for Civil Air Patrol members and the general public.

=== Emergency services ===
The Civil Air Patrol performs emergency services, which includes performing air and ground search and rescue, disaster relief, counter-drug operations, homeland security missions, and assisting in humanitarian aid assignments. The Civil Air Patrol provides the Air Force support through conducting light transport, communications support, and low-altitude route surveys. CAP members can qualify in different operational qualifications to participate in emergency services missions.

=== Cadet programs ===
The Civil Air Patrol offers a cadet program for youth aged 12 to 20, which includes aerospace education, leadership training, physical fitness and moral leadership. CAP cadets wear modified versions of United States Air Force uniforms, hold rank and grade, and practice military customs and courtesies.

=== Aerospace education ===
The Civil Air Patrol offers aerospace education for CAP members and the general public, including providing training for its members, and offering workshops for youth throughout the nation through schools and public aviation events.

== Organization ==
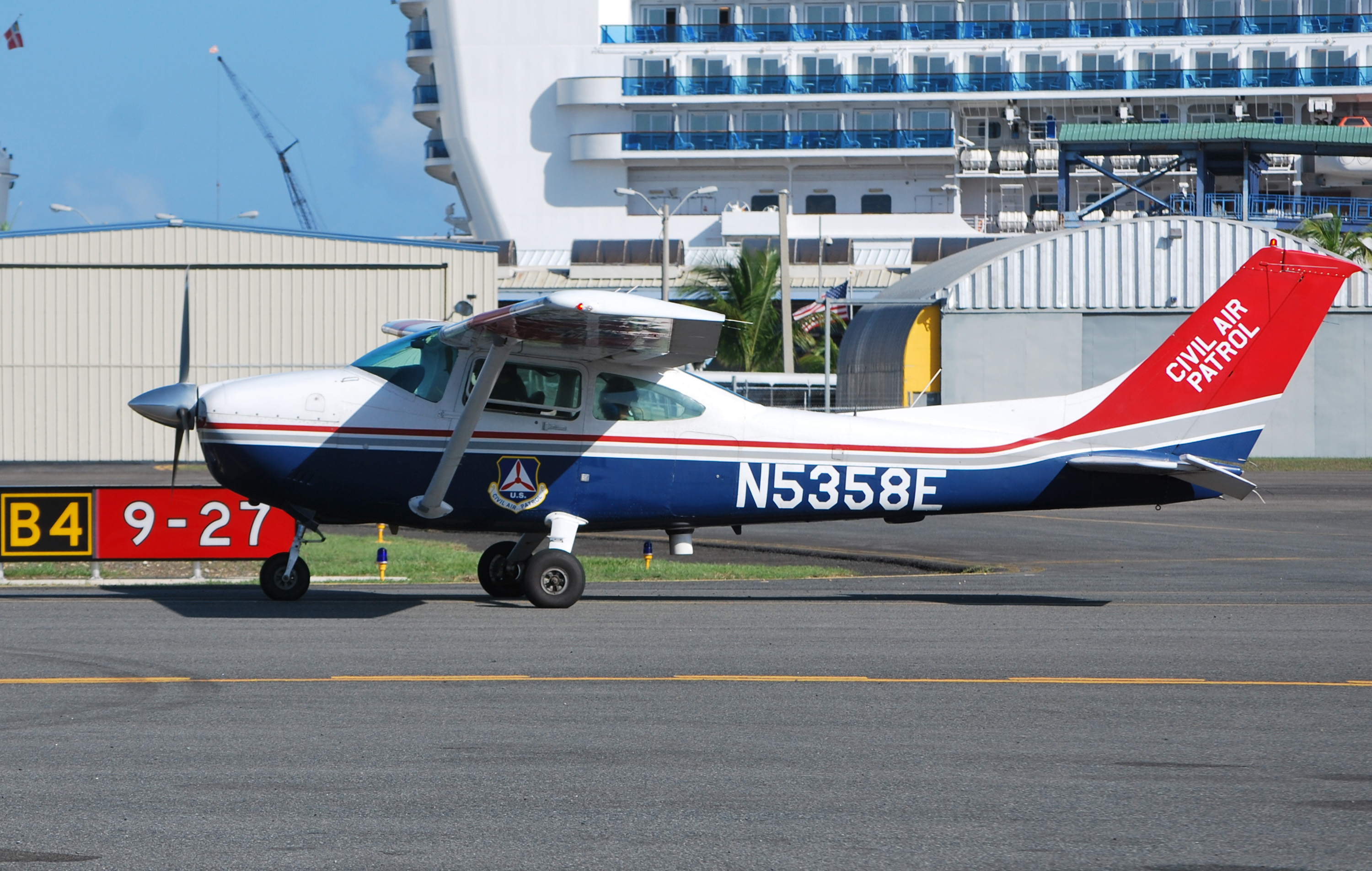
A Civil Air Patrol Cessna 182 belonging to the Puerto Rico Wing.

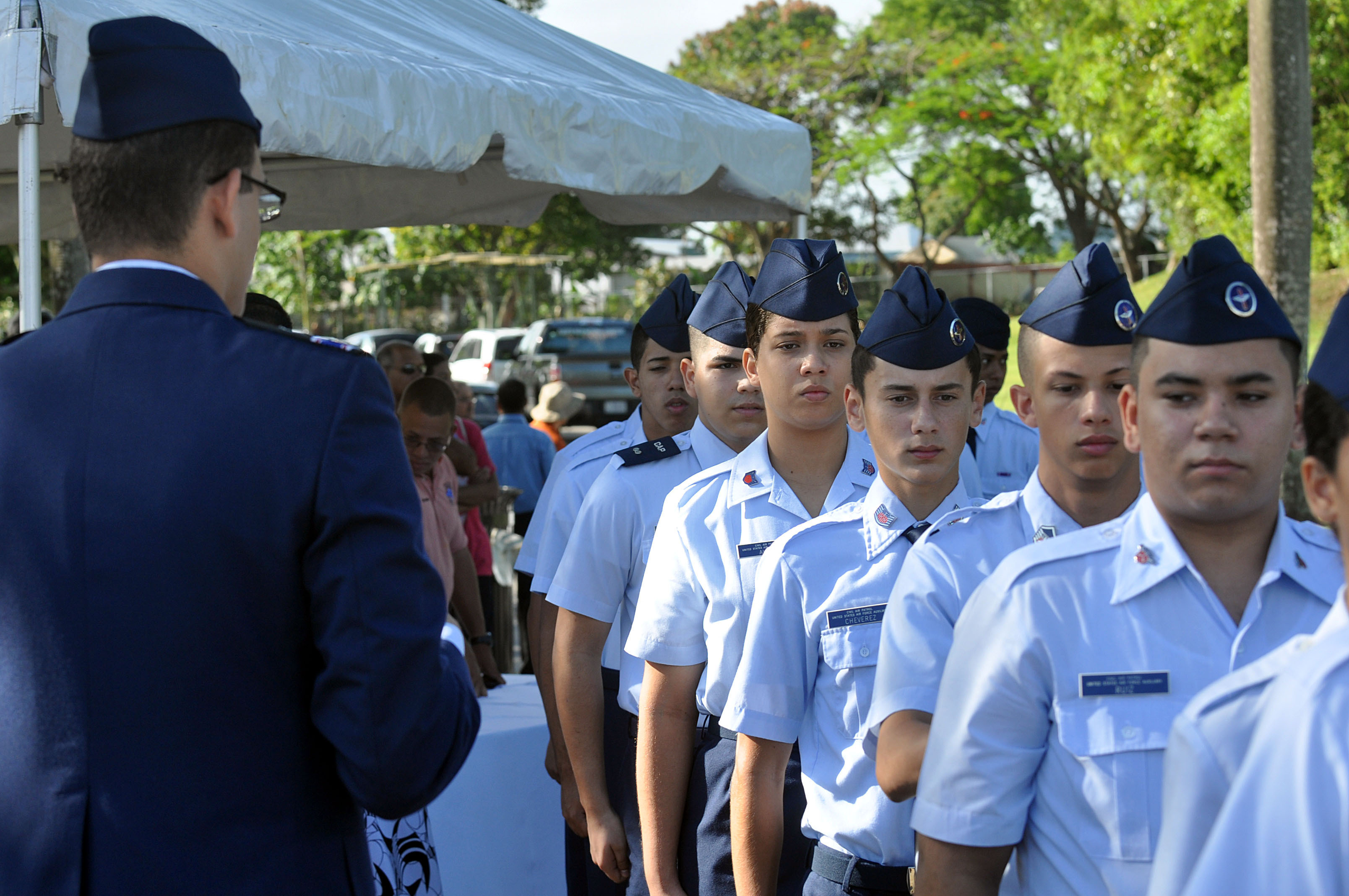
Cadets from the Puerto Rico Wing at the Puerto Rico National Cemetery in Bayamón.

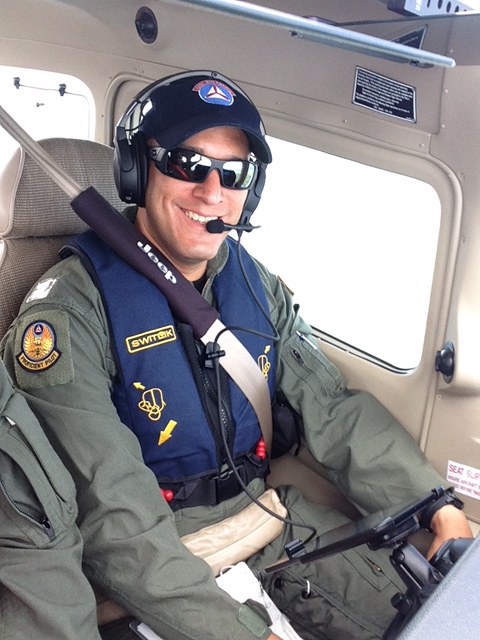
U.S. Air Force Capt. Luis Aponte, 455th Expeditionary Communication Squadron operations officer, flies a Cessna 182 while on a Civil Air Patrol Mission with the Puerto Rico Wing.

Squadrons of the Puerto Rico Wing
Group	Designation	Squadron Name	Location	Notes
	PR-000	Puerto Rico Wing Support Squadron	San Juan	
	PR-001	Puerto Rico Wing Headquarters	San Juan	
	PR-999	State Legislative Squadron	San Juan	
	PR-008	Isla Grande Senior Squadron	Fernando Luis Ribas Dominicci Airport	
Group 1	PR-059	Col Bartolo Ortiz Cadet Squadron	Ceiba	
	PR-081	St. Croix Composite Squadron	Kingshill	
	PR-126	Muñiz ANGB Cadet Squadron	Muñiz Air National Guard Base	
	PR-138	Humacao Cadet Squadron	Humacao	
	PR-903	St. Thomas Composite Squadron	St. Thomas	
Group 2	PR-012	Ponce High School Cadet Squadron	Ponce	
	PR-051	Maj William Biaggi Cadet Squadron	Yauco	
	PR-104	Guánica High School Cadet Squadron	Guánica	
	PR-110	Capt Pedro F. Guisti Piazza Cadet Squadron	Peñuelas	
	PR-120	Sabana Grande Cadet Squadron	Sabana Grande	
	PR-142	Ponce Senior Squadron	Ponce	
	PR-168	Capt Lawrence E. Erickson Senior Squadron	Guayanilla	
	PR-802	Adler Cadet Squadron	Gurabo	
Group 3	PR-035	Aguadilla Cadet Squadron	Punta Borinquen Radar Station	
	PR-066	Cabo Rojo Cadet Squadron	Cabo Rojo	
	PR-068	Lajas Cadet Squadron	Lajas	
	PR-079	Moca High School Cadet Squadron	Moca	
	PR-129	Añasco Senior Squadron	Añasco	
Group 4	PR-034	Arecibo Cadet Squadron	Arecibo	
	PR-092	Lt Col Agustín Díaz Cadet Squadron	Toa Baja	
	PR-094	Lt Col Elsa M. Soto-Torres Cadet Squadron	Bayamón	
	PR-122	Col Clara Livingston Cadet Squadron	San Juan	
	PR-123	Dr. Cesareo Rosa-Nieves Cadet Squadron	San Juan	
	PR-131	Bayamón Cadet Squadron	Bayamón	
	PR-161	Capt Saulo Solis-Molina Cadet Squadron	Cataño	
	PR-801	Kingdom Cadet Squadron	Dorado	

== Notable alumni ==
- Elmer Román - former Puerto Rico Secretary of State
- Eurípides Rubio - recipient of the Medal of Honor
- Clara Livingston - former PR wing commander and 200th woman to earn a pilot license
- Joseph O. Prewitt Diaz- recipient of the APA International Humanitarian Award

== See also ==
- Awards and decorations of the Civil Air Patrol
- Ranks of the Civil Air Patrol
- Puerto Rico Air National Guard
- Puerto Rico State Guard
  - 1st Air Base Group
