= Aero Virgin Islands =

Airline in St. Thomas, USA

- Commenced operations: 1977; 49 years ago
- Ceased operations: 1990; 36 years ago
- Destinations: Caribbean
- Headquarters: St. Thomas
- Key people: Joseph A. Cranston, Manager; Mark K. Odiorne, founder; Reuben B. Wheatley, President

Aero Virgin Islands was an airline based in St. Thomas, US Virgin Islands.

== History ==
Aero Virgin Islands Corp. began operating in the Caribbean during the late 1970s. Operations specifications issued by the Federal Aviation Administration under the Federal Aviation Regulations, part 121 issued on March 2, 1977, specialized in inter-island flights to and from St. Thomas Harry S Truman Airport, Alexander Hamilton Airport on Saint Croix and Luis Muñoz Marín International Airport in San Juan, Puerto Rico. The names of some of these airports have been changed over the years. The airline had scheduled flights to the three above Islands, plus charter flights to many points in the Caribbean. The airline used DC-3-202 airplanes in the early years for their flights. Around 1984, they began using the DC-3 A, B and C's (C-47). The aircraft, DC-3 A, B and C's were leased out of Puerto Rico and were formally Air BVI's fleet of aircraft.

Aero Virgin Islands' main competitor was the Puerto Rico based airline, Prinair, until 1984, when Prinair went bankrupt. Aero Virgin Islands was the major mover of passengers for the next few years. However, by middle 1989, most of the fleet was nonoperational with no engines on the aircraft. In September 1989, with only two DC-3 operating, Aero Virgin Islands suffered a setback when N28346 was destroyed in St. Thomas Cyril E. King Airport by Hurricane Hugo. Only the N5117X DC-3 (C-47) was able to be repaired of the damage it suffered during the hurricane and returned to service; it had been put in the hangar at Luis Muñoz Marín International Airport. The rest of the fleet outside on the ramp in San Juan Int'l Airport were totally destroyed by Hurricane Hugo.

In 1986, Aero Virgin Islands Corp. recruited four pilots with DC-3 experience to fly for the airline while they tried unsuccessfully to upgrade their FAA part 135 certificate back to a part 121 certificate and place a Martin 404 on the certificate. The four pilots would be used to offset other pilots who were to be pulled off the line to train on the 404, which they did get. Mr. Peter Pess and Mr. James Beekman were unsuccessful in transitioning Aero Virgin Islands back to be the flag carrier of the Caribbean. Mr. Pess was supposed to supply engines for the DC-3s.

Increased competition from such airlines as LIAT, and American Eagle forced Aero Virgin Islands out of operations by 1990.

== Key people ==
Joseph A. Cranston founded the airline and is listed as general manager in the manual issued on March 21, 1978. Mark K. Odiorne was also one of founders, and he has since died. Mark was listed as vice president of maintenance. James H. Masters was director of operations in one the memos dated March 1980. He was born on the island of St. Croix and grew up on that island. For a short period of time during 1982–1983, Melvin R. Mann (formerly with Peat Marwick Mitchell CPAs in Miami) served as financial VP. Reuben B. Wheatley was the president of Aero Virgin Islands Corp. from the beginning to the end of the airline.

== Fleet ==
- Douglas DC-3

== Accidents and incidents ==
- On January 2, 1978, Douglas DC-3 N15598 ditched in the sea 1,000 feet (300 m) off San Juan. The aircraft was on an international scheduled passenger flight from Saint Thomas Airport, United States Virgin Islands to San Juan. All five people on board survived. The cause of the accident was pilot mismanagement of the fuel system, running the starboard tanks dry when there was fuel available in the port tanks.
- On September 17, 1989, Douglas DC-3 N4425N, Douglas C-47s N100SD, N4471J and N4577Z, were damaged beyond economic repair by Hurricane Hugo at Luis Muñoz Marín International Airport in San Juan Puerto Rico. Douglas C-49J N28346 was damaged beyond economic repair at Cyril E. King Airport, Charlotte Amalie, United States Virgin Islands by Hurricane Hugo.

== See also ==
- Coral Air
- List of defunct airlines of the United States
