= Merlin Express =

Airline of Puerto Rico

IATA	ICAO	Call sign
—	MEI	AVALON
- Commenced operations: 1996; 30 years ago
- Ceased operations: 2000; 26 years ago
- Hubs: Rafael Hernandez International Airport
- Secondary hubs: Cibao International Airport
- Focus cities: Providenciales International Airport
- Destinations: 6
- Parent company: Corporate Air
- Headquarters: Aguadilla, Puerto Rico
- Website: corporateair.net

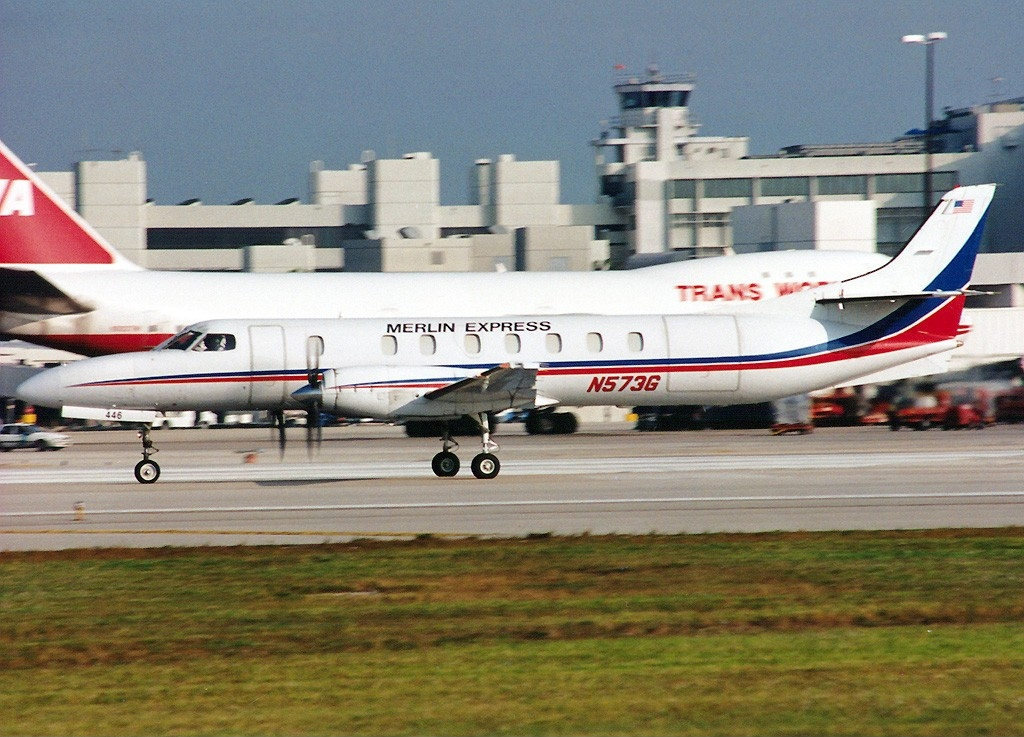
Merlin Express Fairchild Swearingen SA-227AT Merlin IVC

Merlin Express was a Part 135/121 cargo and passenger airline operating at its peak throughout the United States, North and South Caribbean, South America, Alaska, and Mexico. The airline began operations in 1983 as Sat-Air, a subsidiary of Fairchild Aircraft. UPS purchased 14 Merlin IV-C dedicated cargo aircraft from Fairchild and as part of the agreement, Fairchild agreed to provide crew and maintenance services for the aircraft. Similar contracts were signed with the United States Air Force for C-26 sales, though only maintenance add on services were included. Initially, all Merlin Express aircraft provided feeder service to United Parcel Service and were painted in UPS livery. In the ensuing years, the airline began to acquire additional aircraft from its parent Fairchild, and from the open market, incorporating freight service contracts for Federal Express, DHL, and Airborne Express. By 1998, Merlin Express was operating a fleet of approximately 30 Metro III, Merlin IV-C, and Metro II aircraft. In 1996, Merlin successfully gained certification as a passenger Part 121 carrier and operated passenger service routes in Alaska under contract for Yute Air. In 1997, Fairchild Aircraft acquired Dornier Aircraft of Germany and Merlin began preparations for the addition of D-328 aircraft to its fleet. As the airline's parent company began to confront cash problems, Merlin Express, Gen-Aero FBO Services, and other subsidiary companies of Fairchild Dornier Aerospace were sold-off in order to generate needed cash. Merlin Express was purchased by Corporate Air of Billings, Montana in 2000 and renamed "Merlin Airways". Fairchild Dornier Aerospace declared bankruptcy in 2002. Under new owners, Merlin Express' original route network was shrunk and was eventually centered on the airline's remaining hubs in Miami and San Juan, Puerto Rico. Currently based at Rafael Hernández International Airport in Aguadilla, Puerto Rico. The airline still flies to some Caribbean islands, the Turks and Caicos Islands and the Dominican Republic.

== Destinations ==
Regular destinations included Santiago, Dominican Republic, Providenciales, Aruba and Port of Spain.

== See also ==
- List of defunct airlines of the United States
