= Mercedita International Airport =

Airport in Ponce, Puerto Rico

Mercedita International Airport Aeropuerto Internacional Mercedita
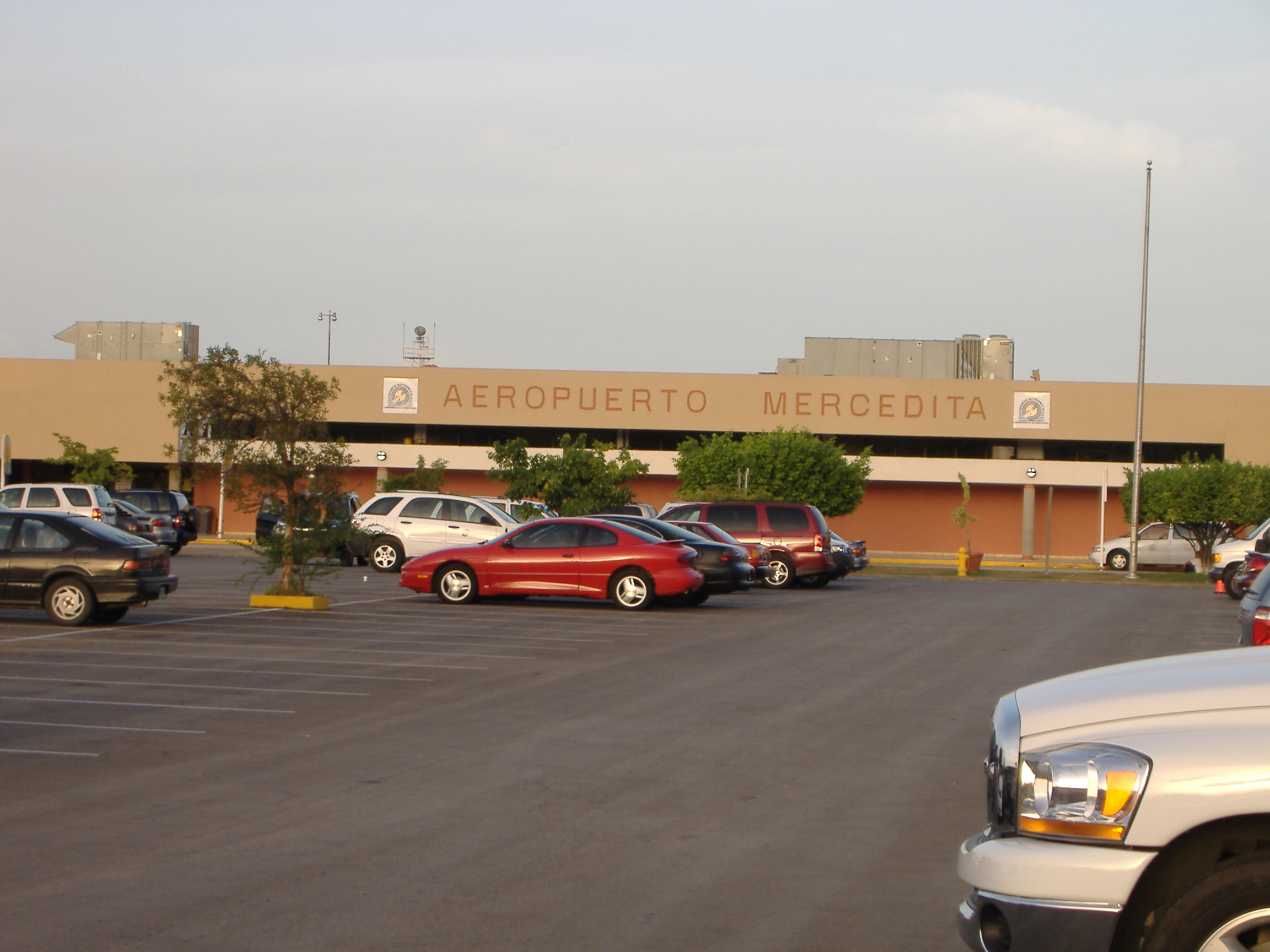
- IATA: PSE; ICAO: TJPS; FAA LID: PSE

Summary
- Airport type: Public
- Owner: Puerto Rico Ports Authority
- Serves: Ponce, Puerto Rico
- Location: Bo. Vayas / Bo. Sabanetas, Ponce, Puerto Rico
- Elevation AMSL: 28 ft (8.5 m)
- Coordinates: 18°00′30″N 66°33′47″W

Map
- Location of airport in Puerto Rico

Runways
Direction	Length		Surface
Direction	ft	m	Surface
12/30	8,004	2,440	Asphalt

Statistics (2014)
- Aircraft operations: 6,211
- Based aircraft: 20
- Passenger movement: 215,165
- Source: FAA SkyVector; Manager: José Riollano Irizarry

Mercedita International Airport (AIM) (Spanish: Aeropuerto Internacional Mercedita) (IATA: PSE, ICAO: TJPS, FAA LID: PSE) is an international airport located three nautical miles (6 km) east of the central business district of Ponce, Puerto Rico. The airport covers 270 cuerdas (approx. 262.2 acres) of land and has one runway. It was inaugurated as an international airport on 1 November 1990. It was built with combined funds from the Municipality of Ponce and the Commonwealth of Puerto Rico. (Note: See accompanying picture below of the building plaque at the airport.)

Mercedita International is Puerto Rico's largest airport in terms of military personnel volume, the second largest in terms of military freight, and the third largest in terms of scheduled commercial passenger traffic. The airport is certified under part 139 of the Federal Aviation Regulations.

As per Federal Aviation Administration records, there were 215,165 enplanements in fiscal year 2015–2016. It is included in the National Plan of Integrated Airport Systems for 2011–2015, which categorized it as a primary commercial service airport. Mercedita was the only one of Puerto Rico's three international airports to see an increase in passenger flow in 2012. The municipality of Ponce has been attempting to gain ownership of the airport from the government of the Commonwealth of Puerto Rico as it believes local management of the airport will help the municipal and regional economy.

== History ==
=== Early history ===
Built in 1939, Mercedita was originally a modest aerodrome used for the airborne irrigation of sugarcane fields belonging to Destilería Serrallés. The airport took the name of the sugarcane plantation that it was part of, Hacienda Mercedita. The founder of the plantation, Juan Serrallés, had named his plantation in honor of his wife Mercedes. To commemorate this, a portrait of Mrs. Mercedes Serrallés was unveiled in the airport on 30 December 1992 by then-governor of Puerto Rico Rafael Hernandez Colon.

The takeoff/landing strip was then only 850 feet (260 m) long by 50 feet (15 m) wide. During World War II it was turned into a military airport, and in 1947 the U.S. Navy ceded the airport to the Puerto Rico Ports Authority. The airport officially started operations in April 1948.

In 1949, however, it was determined that the runway of what was then the Ponce Airport at the nearby Losey Field (today, Fort Allen, Juana Diaz, Puerto Rico) no longer met the newer and more stringent minimum airport safety requirements, and airport operations were suspended. As a result, studies were initiated for the construction of a new airport at Mercedita Airfield. A wall plaque inside the airport states the airport was built with funds from both the Government of Puerto Rico and the Government of the Autonomous Municipality of Ponce and that it was inaugurated in November 1955. It was officially inaugurated on 6 November 1955, via a day-long program of ceremonies and activities transmitted live via radio, and filmed for subsequent TV broadcasting. During the ceremonies, the project's engineer, Raul Gayá Benejám, made delivery of the new facilities to Salvador V. Caro, executive director of the Puerto Rico Ports Authority.

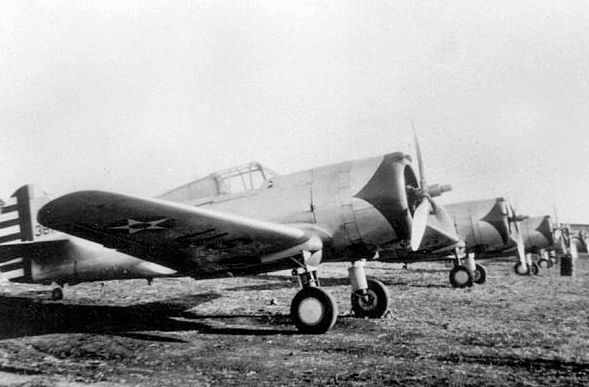
The US Air Force 32nd Fighter Squadron at Mercedita Airport during World War II

The first scheduled commercial flights at Mercedita occurred in 1965 when domestic flights started. International flights started in 1971. Meanwhile, Aerolineas de Ponce began services from Mercedita in 1966; the airline had a hub at the airport but soon had most of its flight operating from San Juan instead and changed its name to Prinair.

On 12 August 1981, an Air Florida plane with 125 Haitian refugees aboard landed at Mercedita en route to the Fort Allen facility in Juana Diaz, part of the 1981 Haitian refugees exodus.

=== New airport ===
The airport has been enlarged on various occasions. One of the architects credited with the airport's construction is Raúl Gayá Benejam. In 1962, Trade Winds started daily direct service to St. Thomas, U.S.V.I. One major construction project, in particular, took place in 1963 when the runway was extended from 3,000 feet (910 m) to 3,900 feet. In 1967, a master plan was adopted for the systematic development of the airport. In 1971 the runway was again extended, to 5,000 feet (1,500 m) to allow for the use by Boeing 727 aircraft. In 1987 the runway was once again extended, this time to 6,900 feet (2,100 m). The passenger terminal was also remodeled, a platform was built for use by general aviation as was a new building for the Air Rescue Unit of the Puerto Rico Police.

=== 1990s expansion work ===
In the fall of 1992, the runway was extended to make it possible for American Airlines to run flights to Miami, Florida. The cost of the expansion was $3 million. The expansion provided 1,900 feet (580 m) additional length, as well as 50 ft (15 m) additional width. Also in the fall of 1992, the Puerto Rico Ports Authority spent another $6 million in improvements to the terminal building. These included an additional 14,500 square feet (1,350 m^{2}) space in the baggage claim, immigration, customs, passenger waiting areas, vending areas, and Department of Agriculture installations.

The airport was formerly called Mercedita Airport, but on 1 November 1990 it was inaugurated as "Mercedita International Airport" after addition of customs and border control facilities.

=== 2000s-2010 ===
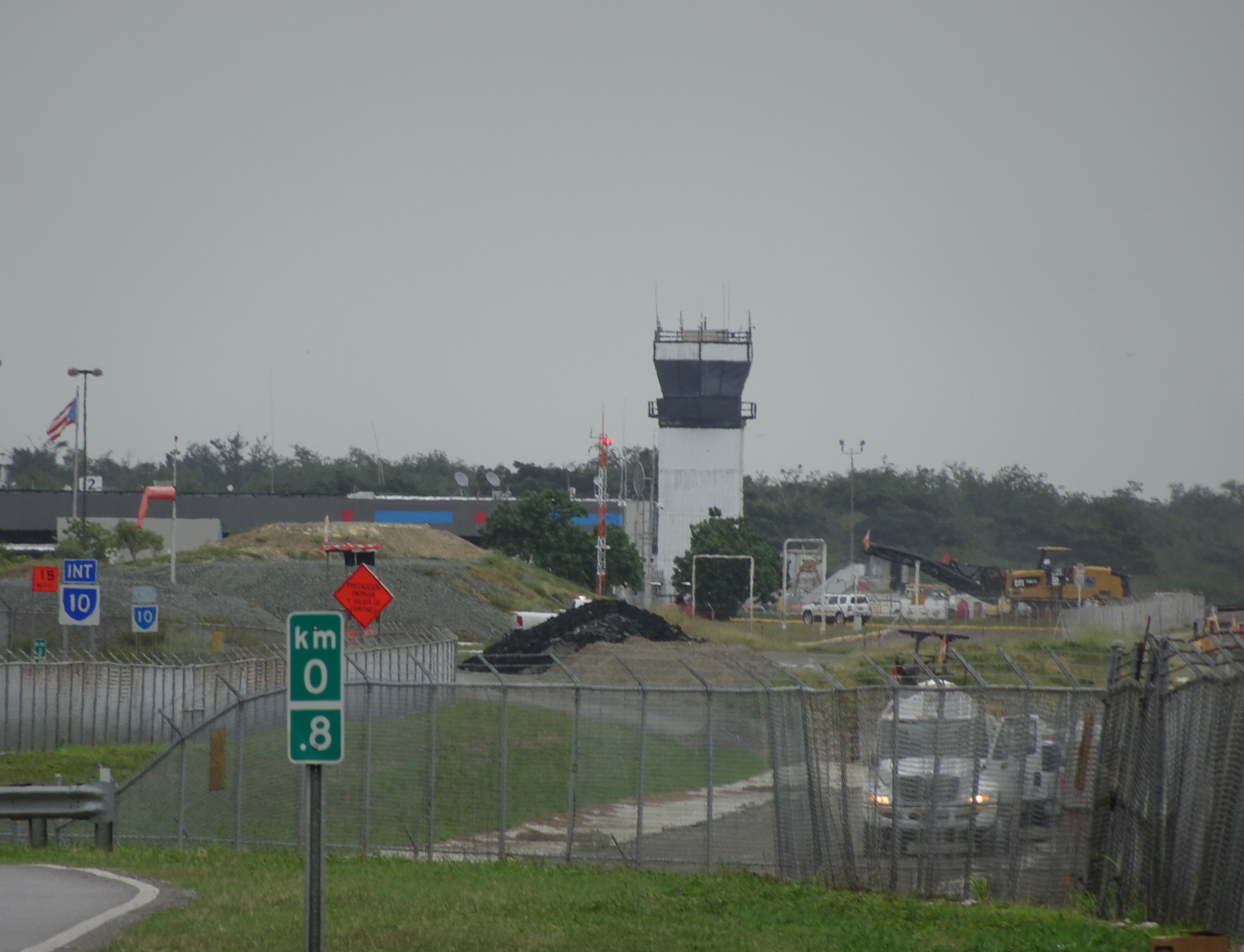
Airport's control tower looking east

After Ponce's mayor Rafael Cordero signed a contract to build a major seaport in the area, Mercedita's directors decided to expand the airport's runway to 8,000 ft (2,438 m) to accommodate anticipated growth in airline traffic.

On 17 June 2005, JetBlue began daily, non-stop service between John F. Kennedy International Airport in New York and Mercedita Airport. On 17 November 2005, Continental Airlines also commenced non-stop service, between Newark Liberty International Airport and Ponce. This service ended on 17 January 2008. On 3 June 2006, Delta Connection began servicing the airport, with twice-weekly, regional jet service to Atlanta, Georgia. The service ended on 20 January 2007. JetBlue has also added daily, non-stop service between Ponce and Orlando International Airport.

During 2007, more passengers passed through the airport than the population of the entire city of Ponce itself. "Ponce's Mercedita airport served 251,000 passengers in 2007, an increase of 28% over the previous year."

Passenger movement at the airport in FY 2008 was 278,911, a 1,228% increase over fiscal year 2003 and the highest of all the regional airports for that 5-year period. In February 2009, Ponce mayor María Meléndez sought transfer of the airport from the Puerto Rico central government to the Ponce Municipal government amidst discontent with the bureaucracy at the central government that could be avoided if the airport was locally managed.

In early 2010, members of the Ponce Chamber of Commerce strongly criticized the Puerto Rico Ports Authority and its director Alvaro Pilar Villagran after failure to execute on a legally binding agreement of November 2008, whereby the Ports Authority agreed to an investment of $8 million to build an airport drainage system needed as part of any additional expansion work.

In 2010, the Puerto Rico Ports Authority announced an investment of $7 million to extend Mercedita's runway to 8,000 feet (2,400 m). Construction began in February 2011. In 2012 the Authority installed two boarding bridges among other terminal improvements.

== Facilities and aircraft ==
Mercedita Airport covers an area of 274 acres (111 ha) at an elevation of 29 feet (9 m) above mean sea level. It has one runway designated 12/30 with an asphalt surface measuring 7,988 by 150 feet (2,435 by 46 m). Runway length includes 1,930 and 230 feet (588 and 70 m) displaced thresholds on Runways 12 and 30 respectively.

Most of the airport is located in Ponce's Vayas barrio, but the western end of the runway (west of Calle la Esperanza) extends into the Sabanetas barrio.

The airport is home to the southern aerial division of the Puerto Rico Police Department. It also has two heavy rescue vehicles.

== Airlines and destinations ==
=== Passenger ===
Airlines	Destinations
Frontier Airlines	Orlando
JetBlue	Fort Lauderdale, Orlando

Destinations map
Destinations from Mercedita Airport

=== Temporary closure ===
The airport stopped handling scheduled commercial passenger flights on 23 March 2020 due to the COVID-19 pandemic. Cargo flights as well as chartered passenger flights were not affected. Flights were scheduled to resume on 6 July 2020, but that date was later revised to 5 August. However, that August 5 date was also later revised to 1 January 2021. During its closure, repairs were made to the airport's taxiway at a cost of $12.8 million. It reopened on 1 April 2021.

== Statistics ==
=== Traffic statistics ===
Passenger statistics for PSE
Year	Passengers	% Change	Year	Passengers	% Change	Year	Passengers	% Change
2001	40,656	–	2010	207,467	▲6.4%	2019	218,753	▲8.7%
2002	27,364	▼32.7%	2011	202,617	▼2.3%	2020	42,528	▼80.6%
2003	19,681	▼28.1%	2012	205,647	▲1.5%	2021	64,198	▲51.0%
2004	20,732	▲5.3%	2013	200,916	▼2.3%	2022	230,691	▲259.3%
2005	78,167	▲277.0%	2014	201,645	▲0.4%	2023	298,334	▲29.3%
2006	196,445	▲151.3%	2015	206,815	▲2.6%	2024	281,901	▼5.5%
2007	249,044	▲26.8%	2016	231,798	▲12.1%	2025	202,024	▼28.3%
2008	236,898	▼4.9%	2017	189,143	▼18.4%	2026		
2009	194,942	▼17.7%	2018	201,260	▲6.4%	2027		

=== Top destinations ===
Carrier shares (August 2025 – July 2026)
Carrier	Passengers
JetBlue	117,000(60.51%)
Frontier	76,520(39.49%)

Top U.S. passenger destinations (departing only) (August 2025 – July 2026)
Rank	City	Airport	Passengers	Airlines
1	Orlando, Florida	Orlando International Airport (MCO)	89,480	Frontier, Jetblue
2	New York City	John F. Kennedy International Airport (JFK)	5,980	Jetblue
3	Fort Lauderdale, Florida	Fort Lauderdale–Hollywood International Airport (FLL)	2,210	Jetblue

== Air service history ==
=== United States ===
United States air service history at Mercedita has been as follows:

- In 1965, Eastern Airlines, together with Caribair, started direct connecting service at the airport. Airport starts the first scheduled domestic commercial service, providing service between Ponce and Mayagüez.
- In 1971, Eastern Airlines held hearing in Ponce with the intention of starting non-stop service to the United States. The Puerto Rico Ports Authority, in anticipation of such service, extended the runway to 5,000 feet (1,500 m) to permit the landing of Boeing 727 aircraft. The airport starts the first scheduled commercial flights from Ponce to the United States.
- In June 1975, Eastern Airlines started a weekly direct flight to New York City with a stop-over in San Juan. In the same year the Puerto Rico Ports Authority built a new runway, access road, parking lot, and shoulder.
- In 1990, Eastern Airlines restarted operations to Ponce with a flight to New York, but it ceased a year later, in January, 1991.
- In 1990, Carnival Airlines also started operations in Ponce, and flew to New York and Miami until February 1998.
- Meanwhile, American Airlines started to fly to Miami from 1 November 1992. The flight ended on 12 September 1993 due to poor load factor
- On 17 November 2005, Continental Airlines began daily non-stop service from Newark Liberty International Airport and Ponce. This service ended on 17 January 2008.
- In November 2007, Spirit Airlines started daily non-stop service from Fort Lauderdale. This service ended in September 2008.
- On 3 June 2006, Delta Connection began servicing the airport, with twice-weekly, regional jet service to Atlanta, Georgia. The service ended on 20 January 2007.
- JetBlue started service to New York in June 2005. Some time later it also started flying to Orlando and Fort Lauderdale

=== Intra-island ===
In addition, several carriers have flown intra-island from Ponce:

- During the 1970s, the airport had extensive domestic daily service by Prinair. Prinair flew to Ponce until it ceased operations in 1984.
- American Eagle, operated by Executive Airlines, began service from San Juan to Ponce in 1986. The service ended in January, 2001.
- Cape Air offered service to San Juan from 2000 flying to Mercedita until 30 April 2011.

=== Freight ===
DHL and FedEx operate air cargo services.

== Accidents and incidents ==
- On 24 June 1972, Prinair Flight 191, which took off from Luis Muñoz Marín International Airport in San Juan, Puerto Rico, crashed while attempting to land at Mercedita Airport. Two crew and three passengers of the 20 on board died.
- On 1 July 2011, a Cessna 185 that was supposed to land at Mercedita airport with a family of five on board, registration number N8438Q, crashed while on its way from Culebra. One body was found in Humacao. The other four passengers are presumed dead.

While not directly associated with this Ponce airport, it is worth noting that the first airplane accident in Puerto Rico occurred in Ponce on 2 December 1911. American airman Tod Schiever died while in an exhibition flight in Ponce, losing control of his plane at a height of 200 feet while making a turn and plunged into a sugar cane field. Another airman also taking part in the exhibition flight, George Smitt (sometimes spelled George Schmidt) completed his exhibition without any eventualities.

== See also ==
- Transportation in Puerto Rico
- List of airports in Puerto Rico
- Fort Allen
