= Clara Livingston =

Early helicopter pilot

Clara Livingstone
- Born: 1900; Chautauqua, New York, US
- Died: January 29, 1992 (92 years old); Dorado, Puerto Rico
- Military career
- Allegiance: United States of America
- Service: United States Army; Women's Army Corps; Civil Air Patrol
- Rank: Colonel (CAP)
- Commands: Puerto Rico Wing (CAP)
- Other work: Instructor pilot

Clara Livingston (1900 in Chautauqua, New York,– January 29, 1992 in Dorado, Puerto Rico) was the 200th licensed female pilot and 11th female helicopter pilot in the world.

Livingston made her first airplane trip in 1927. She was the daughter of Alfred Livingston. In the 1940s Livingston enlisted in the Women's Army Corps (WAC). She was also Wing Commander for the Puerto Rico Wing Civil Air Patrol. At the age of 25, her father died and she managed his property, in Dorado, Puerto Rico, for the next two decades. She built her own landing strip, known as Dorado Airport, on this 1,700 acres (6.9 km^{2}) property. In 1937, Amelia Earhart, who was a friend of Livingston's, made a stop during her last flight at the Isla Grande Airport and stayed overnight. Her home is well recognized in a community known as Dorado Beach for being a historical house which she rebuilt in 1928.

== Legacy ==
The Colonel Clara E. Livingston Good Citizen Award is a wing level educational scholarship named after the aviation pioneer is exclusively awarded each year to Puerto Rico Wing Civil Air Patrol cadets which awards $1,000 for four cadets that demonstrate characteristics of loyalty to nation, state, companions, family and friends.
