= Prinair Flight 191 =

1972 aviation accident

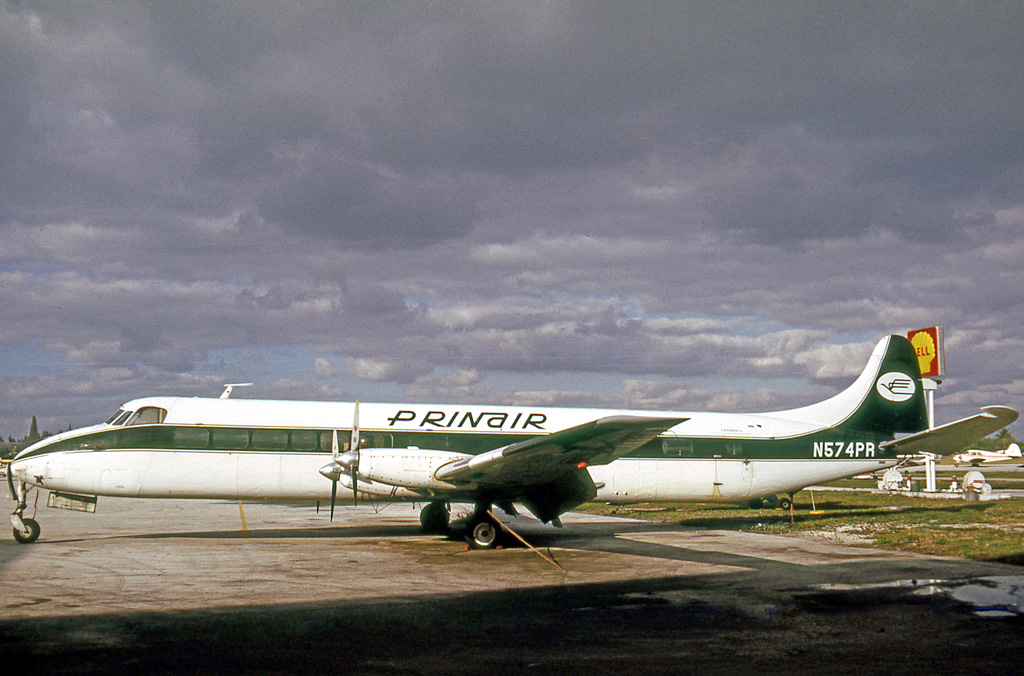
- A Prinair de Havilland DH.114, similar to the aircraft involved in the accident

Accident
- Date: June 24, 1972
- Summary: Pilot error
- Site: Ponce, Puerto Rico; 18°0′22″N 66°33′37″W

Aircraft
- Aircraft type: de Havilland DH.114 Heron 2B
- Operator: Prinair
- Registration: N554PR
- Flight origin: Luis Muñoz Marín Int'l Airport
- Destination: Mercedita Airport
- Occupants: 20
- Passengers: 18
- Crew: 2
- Fatalities: 5
- Injuries: 15
- Survivors: 15

Prinair Flight 191 was a Prinair (Puerto Rico International Airlines) flight from Luis Muñoz Marín International Airport in San Juan, Puerto Rico, to Mercedita Airport in Ponce, Puerto Rico. At approximately 11:15pm on June 24, 1972, the aircraft crashed while attempting to land at Mercedita Airport. Five people died in the accident and the remaining people were injured.

== Aircraft and crew ==
The flight was operated by a de Havilland DH.114 Heron 2B aircraft, registration number N554PR. The aircraft was almost fully loaded, with eighteen passengers and a crew of two on board. (Note: The two NTSB accident reports used as sources describe N554PR as being modified to have 20 passenger seats.) The flight was under the command of Captain Donald Price (28), a very experienced airman who had clocked approximately 8,300 total flight hours, more than 3,000 of which were accrued in the aircraft type. The first officer was Gary Belejeu (27). Far less experienced than the captain, Belejeu had logged roughly 1,400 total flight hours, with 102 hours in the DH-114.

== Flight and accident ==
The flight was uneventful up to the moment of landing. As the flight was late at night, the control tower at Mercedita Airport was closed, therefore the flight crew was responsible for the landing clearance. Just after touching down on the runway at Mercedita Airport the flight crew made a decision to go around. The pilot over-rotated the aircraft and caused it to stall at a low level and crash; three passengers and the two flight crew members died, the other fifteen passengers were injured, seven severely. Heavy fog was also a contributing factor in this accident.

== Investigation ==
The National Transportation Safety Board (NTSB) investigation concluded that the probable cause was the "presence of an unauthorized vehicle on the runway which caused the pilot to attempt a go-around after touchdown to avoid a collision. The maneuver resulted in an overrotation of the aircraft at too low an airspeed to sustain flight". This was based on eyewitness accounts of a set of lights visible on the runway as Flight 191 approached, and other eyewitness accounts of a vehicle owned by the Puerto Rico Ports Authority being parked shortly after the accident and the driver acting in a suspicious manner.

Three years after the accident the NTSB was compelled to re-open the investigation into the crash, after submissions were received that the person who was suspected of driving the "unauthorized vehicle" had actually left the airport about fifteen minutes before the aircraft crashed. The second investigation concluded that there was no airport vehicle on the runway, and that the reason for the go-around of the aircraft was unknown; a new report was issued, explaining the evidence as to the location of the airport vehicle and amending the Probable Cause to remove reference to a vehicle being on the runway.
