= Oceanair =

Regional airline that was based in San Juan, Puerto Rico

- Oceanair Logo
IATA	ICAO	Call sign
TJ	-	-
- Operating bases: Luis Muñoz Marín International Airport
- Destinations: Cyril E. King Airport; Henry E. Rohlsen Airport
- Headquarters: San Juan, Puerto Rico

Oceanair (IATA: TJ) was a regional airline that was based at Luis Muñoz Marín International Airport in San Juan, Puerto Rico. It competed on domestic routes with Prinair; and on routes to the Virgin Islands with Prinair and with Aero Virgin Islands; using propeller-driven aircraft.

The airline flew from the late 1970s, when it started flying as Trans Commuter Airline, to the mid-1980s.

According to the Oceanair February 15, 1982 system timetable, the airline operated up to thirteen flights a day between San Juan and St. Thomas, up to nine flights a day between San Juan and St. Croix, and two flights a day between St. Thomas and St. Croix. The airline was operating 40-passenger Fairchild F-27s and 10-passenger Beechcraft Queen Airs at this time.

== Fleet ==
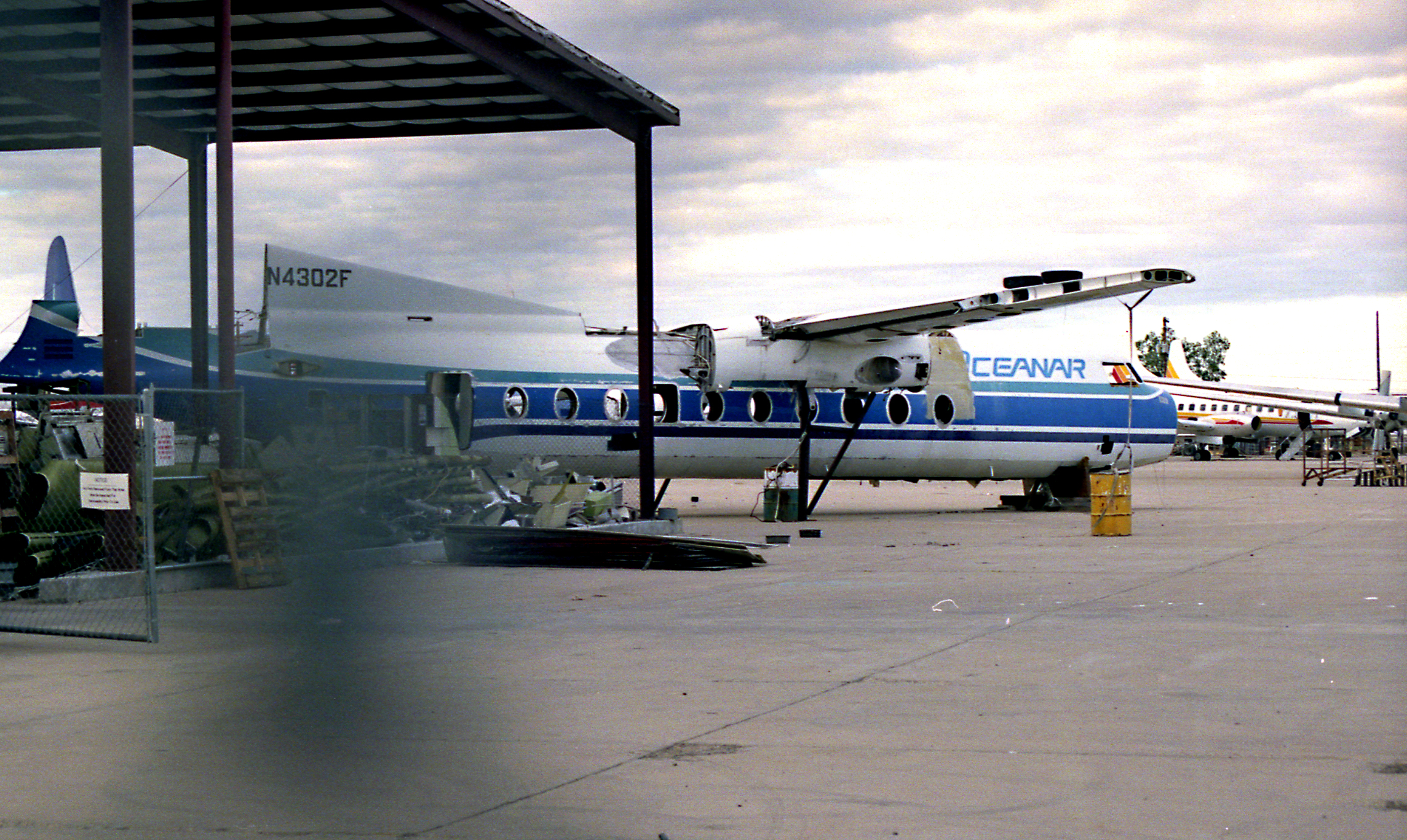
Fairchild F-27, formerly of Puerto Rican airline Oceanair, still bearing that company's livery years after being taken off service

The fleet consisted of Fairchild F-27 and CASA 212 turboprops as well as Beechcraft Queen Air piston-engine light aircraft.

== In popular culture ==
Oceanair was featured on Los Chicos' movie, Coneccion Caribe.

== See also ==
- List of defunct airlines of the United States
- Aeronaves de Puerto Rico
