= Dorado Wings =

Commuter airline that operated in Puerto Rico

- Commenced operations: 1964; 62 years ago
- Ceased operations: 1988; 38 years ago (as Crown Air)
- Operating bases: Luis Muñoz Marín International Airport, Puerto Rico
- Fleet size: 13 BN-2A Britten Norman Islanders; 3 Handley Page Jetstreams, 5 de Havilland Canada DHC-6 Twin Otters; 1 Piper Navajo; 1 Fairchild Swearingen Metroliner
- Destinations: Dorado Airport; See below
- Headquarters: San Juan, Puerto Rico

Dorado Wings was a small commuter airline that operated from Luis Muñoz Marín International Airport in San Juan, Puerto Rico to Dorado Airport in the tourist center of Dorado, Puerto Rico. Dorado Wings was the only commercial operator at Dorado Airport. Dorado Wings existed under that name from 1964 to 1981. In early 1981, the airline was purchased and its name was changed to Crown Air which operated until 1988.

Commuter turboprop and prop aircraft operated by Dorado Wings during its existence included:

- 13 Britten-Norman BN-2 Islander (BN-2A models)
- 5 de Havilland Canada DHC-6-300 Twin Otter
- 3 Handley Page Jetstream
- 1 Piper Navajo
- 1 Swearingen Metroliner

Flights from San Juan to Dorado took 15 minutes. Because of the shortness of their flights, Dorado Wings airplanes were a constant sight every day at many airports throughout this part of the Caribbean. Airports served in Puerto Rico were San Juan International (SJU), Isla Grande (SIG), Dorado Beach (DBA), Mayagüez (MAZ), Palmas Del Mar (PDM) and Aguadilla (BQN) (former Ramey Air Force Base). Other Caribbean airports served were St. Thomas (STT), St. Croix (STX), Tortola/Beef Island BVI (EIS), Virgin Gorda BVI (VIJ), St. Kitts (SKB), St. Maarten/St. Martin (SXM), St. Barts (SBH) and Anguilla (AXA). Still more airports were served on a charter basis.

== Incidents and accidents ==
In 1981, a Dorado Wings airplane suffered an accident on a non revenue flight after takeoff at San Juan airport. There were no major injuries or fatalities, though the aircraft was totaled.

The airline was, at the time, part of a group of smaller Puerto Rican airlines that were seen commonly at San Juan's international airport. These also included Flamenco Airways, Prinair, Oceanair and Vieques Air Link, of which, as of 2012, only Vieques Air Link and Flamenco Airways survived (Prinair returned to the skies during 2019).

== See also ==
- List of defunct airlines of the United States
