= Pro-Air Services =

Puerto Rican airline

IATA	ICAO	Call sign
-	-	-
- Commenced operations: 1981
- Operating bases: Luis Muñoz Marín International Airport
- Fleet size: See Fleet below
- Headquarters: San Juan, Puerto Rico

Pro-Air Services is an air charter operator based at Luis Muñoz Marín International Airport, San Juan, Puerto Rico. This small charter airline has been in operation since 1981.

== Fleet ==
- 1 - Aero Commander
- 1 - Piper Aztec
