= Dorado Airport =

Airport in Dorado, Puerto Rico

- IATA: DDP; ICAO: none

Summary
- Location: Dorado, Puerto Rico
- Coordinates: 18°27′52″N 066°17′33″W

Map
- Location in Puerto Rico

Runways
Direction	Length		Surface
Direction	ft	m	Surface
10/28	3,500	1,067	Paved
- Sources: IATA, coordinates, runway, well

Dorado Airport or Dorado Beach Airport (IATA: DDP) was a small single runway airport in Dorado, Puerto Rico.

Clara Livingston, the owner of the property at the time, ordered the strip be built, and her friend, Amelia Earhart, may have used the facility as well. Later on, the United States military, during World War II, paved the runway.

Much later on, a large airline named Caribair (later overtaken by Eastern Air Lines), began flights there. When Caribair became part of Eastern, flights to Dorado Airport were suspended.

During the mid 1960s, Dorado was served by Dorado Wings (later renamed Crown Air), a small airline that operated charter flights between Dorado Airport and Luis Muñoz Marín International Airport in San Juan. The airline operated propeller airplanes.

In the early 1990s, the airport was officially closed. In 1996, the parcel was rezoned and construction commenced of a master planned community: Dorado Beach East. In memory of Dorado Airport and its founder, Ms. Clara Livingston, the developers built a children's playground themed with unique play airplanes, a hangar for activities, and a runway plaza.
