= Puerto Rico Air Management Services =

Airline of Puerto Rico

Puerto Rico Air Management Services (PRAMS)
- Operating bases: Miami International Airport
- Destinations: US, Caribbean (including Cuba), South America

Puerto Rico Air Management Services (PRAMS) is an air charter and cargo operator based out of the Miami International Airport. The airline was founded in 2005. Its operating certificate allows it to fly to the US, the entire Caribbean (including Cuba) and South America. At one point, the company also had a then-unique operating permit, that allowed it to operate flights from the United States mainland to Cuba, operating charter flights that usually carry excess baggage and other cargo for companies that arranged these unique flights leaving the Miami International Airport to the otherwise U.S. embargoed Caribbean island.

== Fleet ==
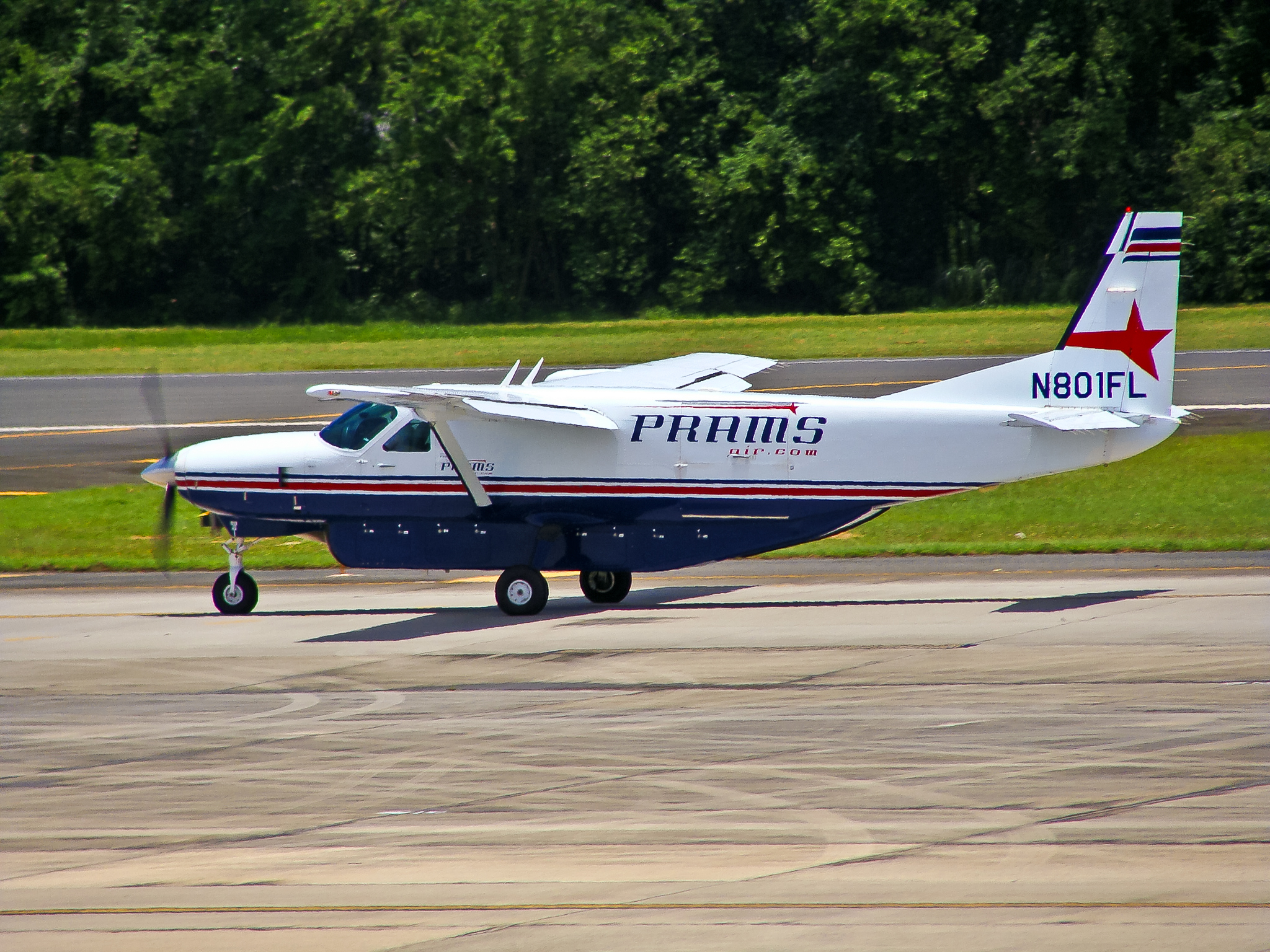
Prams Air plane N801FL at Luis Muñoz Marín International Airport

- Cessna 210

== Accident & incidents ==
On November 11, 2015, a Cessna Cargo Configuration was added to certificate(C-210). No injuries were reported.
