= Puertorriqueña de Aviación =

Puerto Rican airline company

IATA	ICAO	Call sign
-	-	-
- Founded: 1936; 90 years ago
- Ceased operations: 1941; 85 years ago
- Operating bases: San Juan, Puerto Rico
- Fleet size: See Fleet below
- Destinations: See Destinations below
- Headquarters: San Juan, Puerto Rico
- Key people: Horacio and Narciso Basso

Puertorriqueña de Aviación, previously known as Aerovías Nacionales de Puerto Rico (alternatively known as ANPRI) was an airline company that operated during the 1930s. It was the first documented attempt by Puerto Ricans to have a flag carrier in the country.

== History ==
In 1936, brothers Horacio and Narciso Basso acquired a hydroplane to start commercial airline flights around the Caribbean.

ANPRI started flights from San Juan to Vieques, St. Thomas, St. Croix and Culebra. These flights allegedly took off from Residencial Las Casas, which at the time was a military base and was the place where the first Puerto Rican pilot, Félix Rigau Carrera, took off on his first flight as a pilot. The hydroplane that Aerovías Nacionales used was named "Kofresi", after the famous pirate, Roberto Cofresi.

1937 was an important year for the airline, as the company tried to get air mail contracts. The company struggled in its attempt at getting proper authorization to use postage stamps as a way to suffrage their air mail transports. On April 27, however, Aerovías Nacionales got permission to proceed with the charge of stamps, and by April 28, customers had to pay shipping of goods on Aerovías Nacionales. Costs for shipping were 3 cents on inter-Puerto Rican island flights and 10 cents on other flights. In 1938, Aerovías Nacionales began issuing their own logo-stamps, which cost 5 cents each. These were used as tax payments, therefore the range of air mail shipping costs on Aerovías Nacionales rose to 8 cents for inter-Puerto Rican islands flights and 15 cents for flights to other Caribbean spots.

At this point in their history, Aerovias Nacionales de Puerto Rico had US$120,000 ($2.69 million in 2025 dollars) of authorized capital; it flew routes from San Juan to Ponce, Guanica, Guayama, Aguadilla, Mayaguez, Fajardo, and Saint Thomas as well as from Fajardo to Vieques and from Saint Thomas to Saint Croix. The airline apparently had plans to buy a Beechcraft airplane which would have allowed the airline to operate flights carrying up to 600 pounds (weight) each.

By then, Dennis Powelson, who was a company pilot for the famed Don Q Puerto Rican rum brand, had established his own airline, Powelson Airlines. The Airline would provide Aerovías Nacionales with stiff competition; from May 15 to May 21 of 1938, the USPS organized a race between the two airlines in order to give the winning airline air mail routes. Aerovías Nacionales' airplane was not able to perform its duty and Felix Juan Serrallés Sanchez (1911–1985), who took off from Mercedita Airport in Ponce, won the race for the Powelson Airlines.

On March 22, 1941, a second set of stamps to be used by package senders on Aerovías Nacionales was issued. The total number of different Aerovías Nacionales stamps released in 1941 was eight. Currently, Aerovías Nacionales de Puerto Rico stamps are considered to be collector's items because of the scarcity of such stamps.

== Fleet ==
1 Hydroplane

== Destinations ==
- Culebra, Puerto Rico
- St. Croix, United States Virgin Islands
- St. Thomas, USVI
- Vieques, Puerto Rico
- Aguadilla
- Fajardo
- Guanica
- Guayama
- Mayaguez
- Ponce

== See also ==
- List of defunct airlines of the United States
- Cabotage
