= San Juan Aviation =

Airline of Puerto Rico

San Juan Aviation is a company with hangars located in Anacortes, Washington. It was founded 2001.
