= Prinair =

Puerto Rican airline company

IATA	ICAO	Call sign
PQ	PRU	COLORBIRD
- Founded: 1964; 62 years ago, as Aerolíneas de Ponce (Ponce Airlines)
- Commenced operations: 1966; 60 years ago, 2007; 19 years ago, 2019; 7 years ago
- Ceased operations: 1 June 1985; 41 years ago, 2010; 16 years ago
- Operating bases: Mercedita Airport
- Hubs: Ponce, Aguadilla (2019)
- Focus cities: San Juan
- Fleet size: 39
- Destinations: St. Thomas; St. Croix; Mayaguez; San Juan; Aguadilla; Tortola; Antigua; St. Kitts; St. Maarten; Santo Domingo; Santiago, D.R. Caicos Islands
- Parent company: Aerolíneas de Ponce
- Headquarters: Ponce, Puerto Rico
- Key people: Jaime S. Carrión, President (1972); Cesar Toledo, President (1979); Juan C Hernandez, President 2014 (actual)
- Employees: 600

Prinair is a Puerto Rican charter operator airline. It was Puerto Rico's domestic and international flag carrier airline for almost two decades from the mid-1960s to the mid-1980s. Despite previously ceasing scheduled commercial operations twice, it restarted flights on March 19, 2019.

== History ==
Service began in 1966 under the name Aerolíneas de Ponce (Ponce Airlines) with Aero Commander aircraft. The initial service flew from Mercedita Airport in Ponce to Luis Muñoz Marín International Airport (then known as Isla Verde International Airport) in San Juan. The company's name was changed to Prinair the following year (Puerto Rico International Airlines).

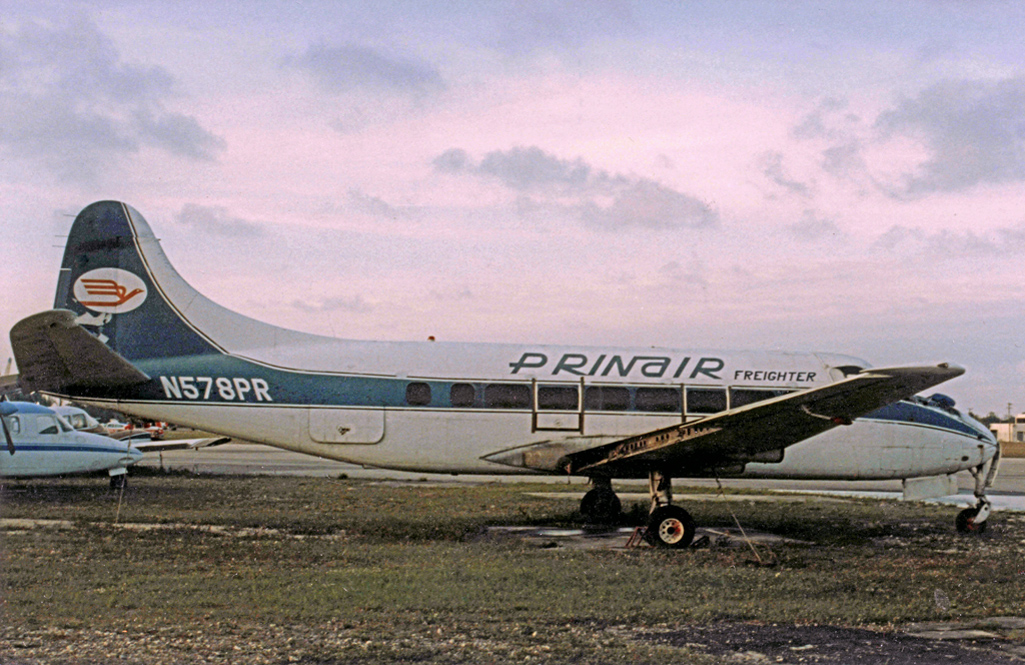
De Havilland Heron freighter of Prinair at Opa-locka Airport near Miami in 1987

The airline later used de Havilland Heron piston-engined aircraft for its services. Prinair introduced their own version of the Heron by converting the aircraft to use 300 hp Continental IO-520 engines in place of the original 250 hp Gipsy Queen 30-2 engines. The Prinair fleet which grew to over 20 aircraft was the largest Heron fleet in the world. During the 1970s, expansion saw the airline start cargo freighter services to Opa-locka (a Florida location near Miami) as well as passenger service to Santo Domingo, the Virgin Islands (U.S. and British), Martinique, Barbados, Puerto Plata, and other Caribbean destinations, as well as Vieques, Mayagüez, Culebra and Aguadilla on the domestic side.

During 1978, Nicolas Nogueras, a Puerto Rican politician, sought a writ of certiorari against Prinair at the United States Supreme Court; he was denied.

In the early 1980s, Prinair introduced into service larger and more capable Convair 580 turboprop aircraft. This provided the plane spotter at San Juan with another interesting aircraft type to look out for, but did little for the airline other than help increase the earnings from the Virgin Islands routes. Increased competition for these routes from Aero Virgin Islands and Oceanair, in addition to a measure of distrust from the public that had not forgotten a number of fatal crashes, resulted in Prinair ceasing operations in 1985. It was the intention that Prinair would have been one of the launch customers of the CASA CN-235 and at the roll-out of the new aircraft in September 1983 the prototype was actually painted in Prinair colors (right side only).

However, the demise of Prinair prevented delivery. The airline did operate an earlier CASA-manufactured aircraft, the C-212 Aviocar turboprop.

In 2007, the airline resumed operations with Piper Chieftain propeller-driven aircraft. The airline again ceased all flights in 2010.

The company's Prinairtours announced that in 2019 Prinair would relaunch flights as a charter airline, starting with services between Aguadilla on Puerto Rico's northwest coast and Punta Cana, Dominican Republic.

== Incidents and accidents ==
Prinair suffered three fatal accidents and two non-fatal hijacking incidents during its existence.

On March 5, 1969 Prinair Flight 277 departed Saint Thomas, U.S. Virgin Islands for a flight to San Juan. Seventeen minutes after take-off, the crew contacted San Juan Approach Control. The approach controller on duty (a trainee) replied; "Prinair Two Seven Seven, San Juan Approach Control, radar contact three miles east of Isla Verde...maintain four thousand." The aircraft was actually three miles east of the Fajardo waypoint instead of the Isla Verde waypoint (which is located about 10 miles west of the Fajardo waypoint). Six minutes later the aircraft crashed in the Sierra de Luquillo mountains at an elevation of about 2400 feet; all 19 occupants were killed. The accident investigation found that Air Traffic Control was to blame.

On June 24, 1972 Prinair Flight 191 crashed after going around just after touching down at Ponce's Mercedita Airport, killing five of the 20 occupants (including both pilots). An accident investigation found that the go-around was prompted by a vehicle on the runway, but the investigation was re-opened three years after the accident due to evidence that there was no vehicle on the runway; the second investigation concluded that the go-around was for unknown reasons.

Prinair Flight 610 crashed moments after taking off at Saint Croix, U.S. Virgin Islands on July 24, 1979, with the loss of eight lives. An accident investigation found that the aircraft had been overloaded by 1,060 pounds and that the center of gravity (CG) was 8 inches beyond the maximum rear limit.

== Destinations in 1981 ==
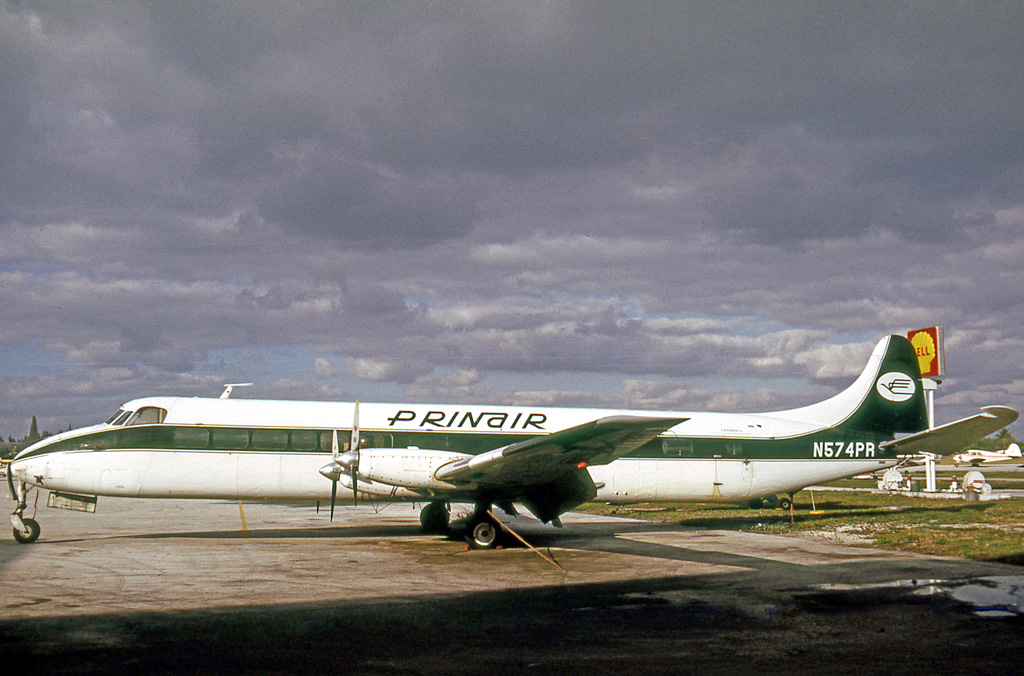
A Prinair DH.114 Heron 2

According to the February 1, 1981 Prinair system timetable route map, the airline was operating scheduled passenger service to the following destinations in the Caribbean. All flights were operated with either Convair 580 turboprop or de Havilland Heron prop aircraft at this time:

- Antigua, West Indies
- Guadeloupe, Caribbean
- Mayaguez, Puerto Rico
- Ponce, Puerto Rico - Airline headquarters
- St. Croix, U.S. Virgin Islands
- St. Kitts, West Indies
- St. Maarten, Netherlands Antilles
- St. Thomas, U.S. Virgin Islands
- San Juan, Puerto Rico - Hub
- Santo Domingo, Dominican Republic
- Tortola, British Virgin Islands

== In popular culture ==
A Prinair Beechcraft King Air 100 aircraft appears in the 2022 film The Lost City

== See also ==
- List of airlines of Puerto Rico
- Aeronaves de Puerto Rico
- Oceanair
- Puertorriquena de Aviacion
- VAL
