= Caribair (Puerto Rico) =

Airline based in Puerto Rico (1939–1973)

IATA	ICAO	Call sign
CB^{(1)}	CB^{(1)}	CARIBAIR
- Founded: 27 February 1939 (incorporated in Puerto Rico)
- Commenced operations: 1 June 1939
- Ceased operations: 15 May 1973
- Operating bases: San Juan, Puerto Rico
- Fleet size: See Fleet below
- Destinations: See Destinations below
- Headquarters: San Juan, Puerto Rico, United States

Notes
- (1) IATA, ICAO codes were the same until the 1980s

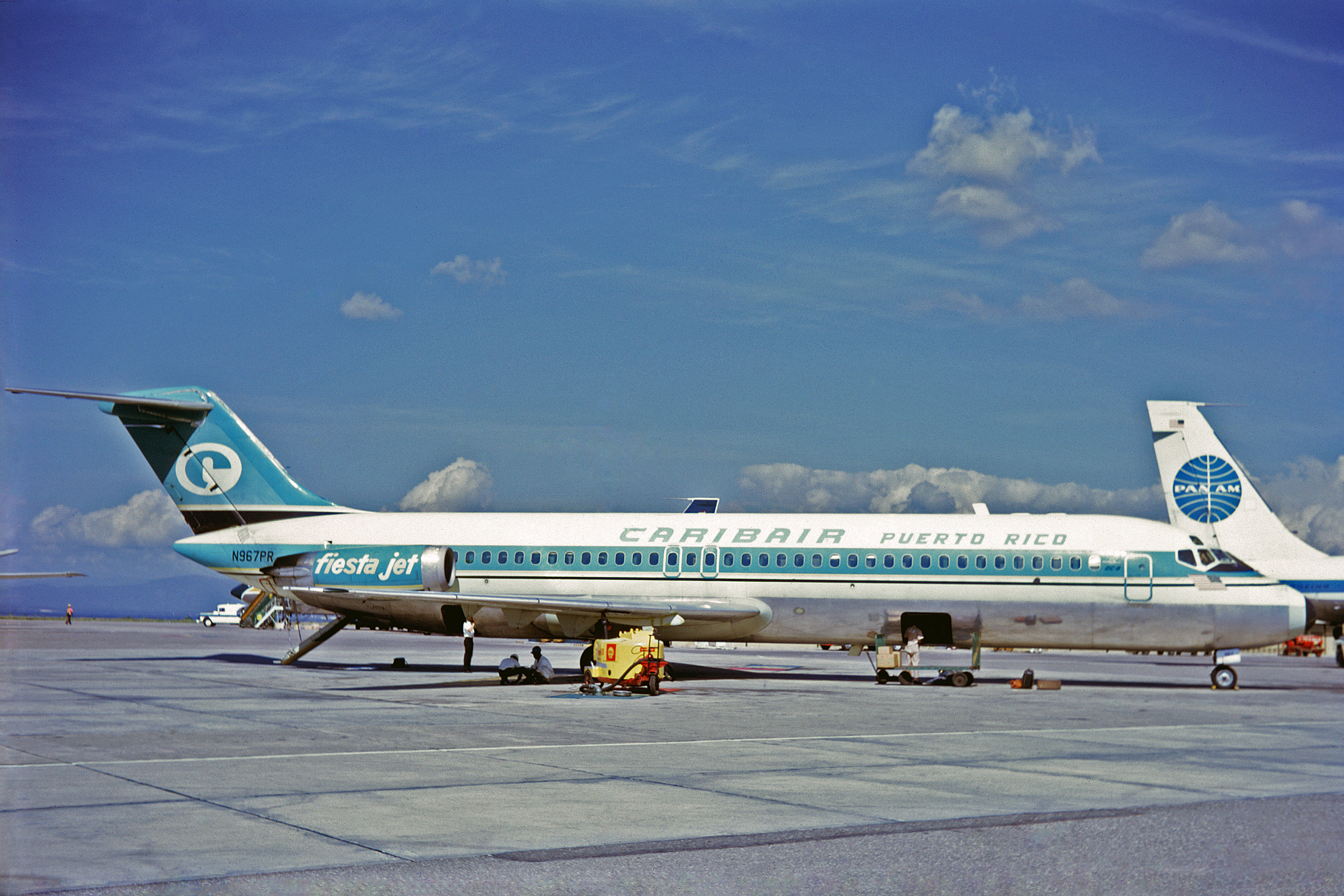
DC-9-30 at Kingston in 1971

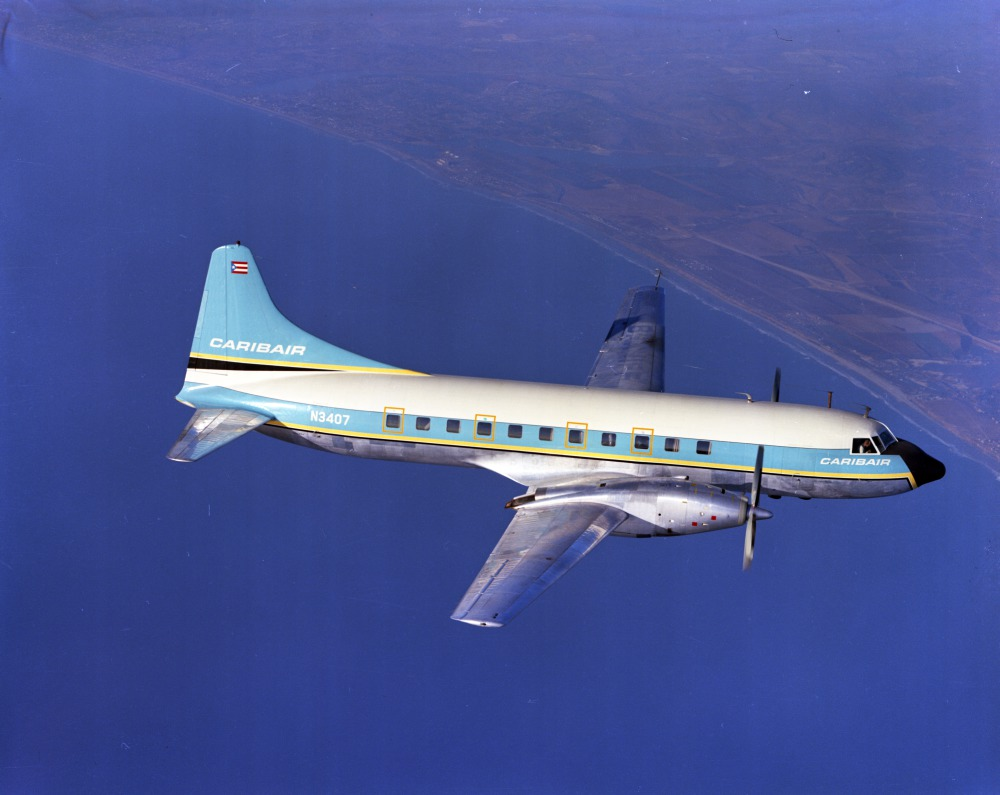
Convair 640 1965 predelivery flight

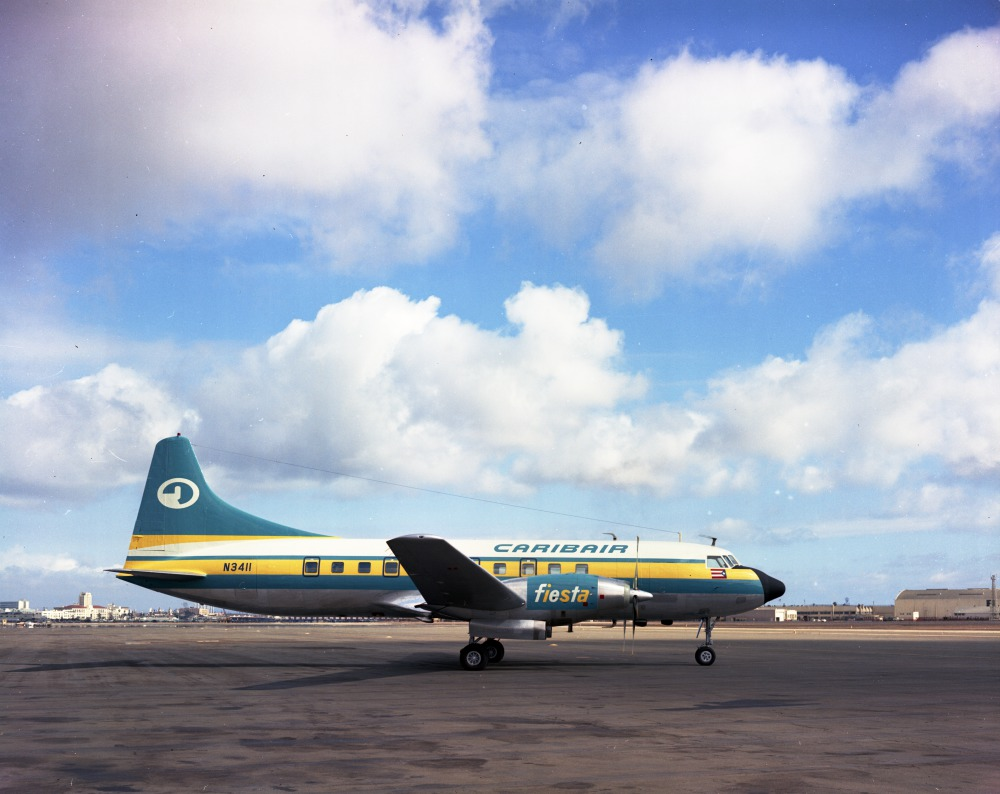
Convair 640 San Diego 1966

Caribair was a Puerto Rican airline based in San Juan, Puerto Rico, that served over a dozen destinations in the Caribbean as well as Miami. In 1970, the air carrier was serving sixteen destinations on fourteen Caribbean islands with some flights offering direct, no change plane service to and from Miami. The airline offered McDonnell Douglas DC-9-30 jet service via a number of intermediate stops including San Juan (SJU) for its direct flight services between Miami (MIA) and Port of Spain, Trinidad. Caribair was the first Puerto Rico-based airline to operate jet aircraft on scheduled passenger services. The air carrier was acquired by Eastern Air Lines in 1973. In 1967, the Eastern system timetable listed Caribair flights operated with Convair 640 "prop jet" aircraft as connecting services between San Juan and both St. Croix and St. Thomas in the U.S. Virgin Islands.

== History ==
The history of Caribair dates to Powelson Airlines (aka, the Powelson Line and Powelson Air Service), an airline founded in 1938 by Dennis Powelson, a former pilot for Destileria Serralles in Ponce. On 27 February 1939, Powelson Air Service changed its name to Caribbean-Atlantic Airlines (aka, Caribair) simultaneous with the incorporation of Caribair. In 1946 Mr. Powelson sold Caribbean-Atlantic Airlines (Caribair) to Dionisio, Benigno and Juan Trigo, three Puerto Rican brothers with an import-export business and business interests in Spain. Caribair was absorbed by Eastern Air Lines on 15 May 1973.

The Caribair service was popular both with local residents and tourists alike, traveling between Puerto Rico and other Caribbean islands. By 1950, the airline's name had officially changed to Caribair and service to the Dominican Republic were initiated. Caribair continued to expand during the 1950s and 1960s, and by 1962, the Puerto Rico-based airline was serving a number of international destinations including Santo Domingo, Guadeloupe, St. Thomas, St. Croix and St. Maarten. Domestic destinations included Mayaguez and Ponce. In the early 1960s, Caribair began operating select flights on behalf of Eastern Airlines using Convair 640 turboprop aircraft. In order to compete with an increase in jet flight activity from other airlines, including British West Indian Airways (BWIA) and Leeward Islands Air Transport (LIAT), Caribair placed into service new McDonnell Douglas DC-9-30 jetliners, becoming the first Puerto Rico-based airline to offer modern jet service.

== Destinations ==
The following destination information is taken from the Caribair system timetable dated April 1, 1970. According to this timetable, Caribair was operating all scheduled passenger flights at this time with McDonnell Douglas DC-9-30 jetliners as the airline's Convair 640 turboprop aircraft had been withdrawn from scheduled services.

- Bridgetown, Barbados (BGI)
- Castries, St. Lucia - Vigie Airport, now known as George F.L. Charles Airport (SLU)
- Fort-de-France, Martinique (FDF)
- Kingston, Jamaica (KIN)
- Miami, Florida (MIA)
- Montego Bay, Jamaica (MBJ)
- Oranjestad, Aruba (AUA)
- Pointe-a-Pitre, Guadeloupe (PTP)
- Port-au-Prince, Haiti (PAP)
- Port of Spain, Trinidad (POS)
- Santo Domingo, Dominican Republic (SDQ)
- St. Croix, U.S. Virgin Islands (STX)
- St. John's, Antigua (ANU)
- St. Maarten (SXM)
- St. Thomas, U.S. Virgin Islands (STT)
- San Juan, Puerto Rico (SJU) - Home Base
- Willemstad, Curaçao (CUR)

In 1968, Caribair was operating a mixed fleet consisting of both McDonnell Douglas DC-9-30 jets and Convair 640 turboprops with the latter being used to provide scheduled flights into destinations that were either operationally constrained with regard to DC-9 service or simply could not support the passenger numbers required for profitable jet operations. A number of these destinations were eliminated from the Caribair route system when the airline decided to operate only DC-9 jet service. These former destinations included the islands of Dominica, Grenada, St. Vincent and St. Kitts as well as Mayaguez, Dorado and Ponce on the island of Puerto Rico.

== Fleet ==
As of September 1961:

- 8 Douglas DC-3

Known types operated by Caribair:

- Douglas DC-3 (11 aircraft) - this was also the workhorse of the Caribair fleet well into the 1960s, making regular jaunts between San Juan, Ponce and Mayagüez, particularly before the construction of modern highways on the island.
- McDonnell Douglas DC-9-31 (3 aircraft) - The DC-9 was the only jet aircraft type operated by Caribair.
- Convair CV-340 (9 aircraft)
- Convair CV-440 (leased) (2 aircraft)
- Convair CV-640 (7 aircraft) - The CV-640 was the only turboprop aircraft type operated by Caribair.
- Lockheed Model 50 (leased) (2 aircraft)
- Stinson SM-6000-A/B (5 aircraft)

== Alleged UFO sightings ==
In June 1970, the Puerto Rican Air National Guard apparently received reports from a Caribair jet as well as from a Pan American World Airways (Pan Am) jetliner concerning a mysterious object in the air. Pilots in both aircraft claimed to have seen an unidentified flying object (UFO) close to San Juan's Isla Verde International Airport. The Federal Aviation Administration (FAA) released a statement about this incident in 1977.

== See also ==
- List of defunct airlines of the United States
