= Henry E. Rohlsen Airport =

Airport in the United States Virgin Islands

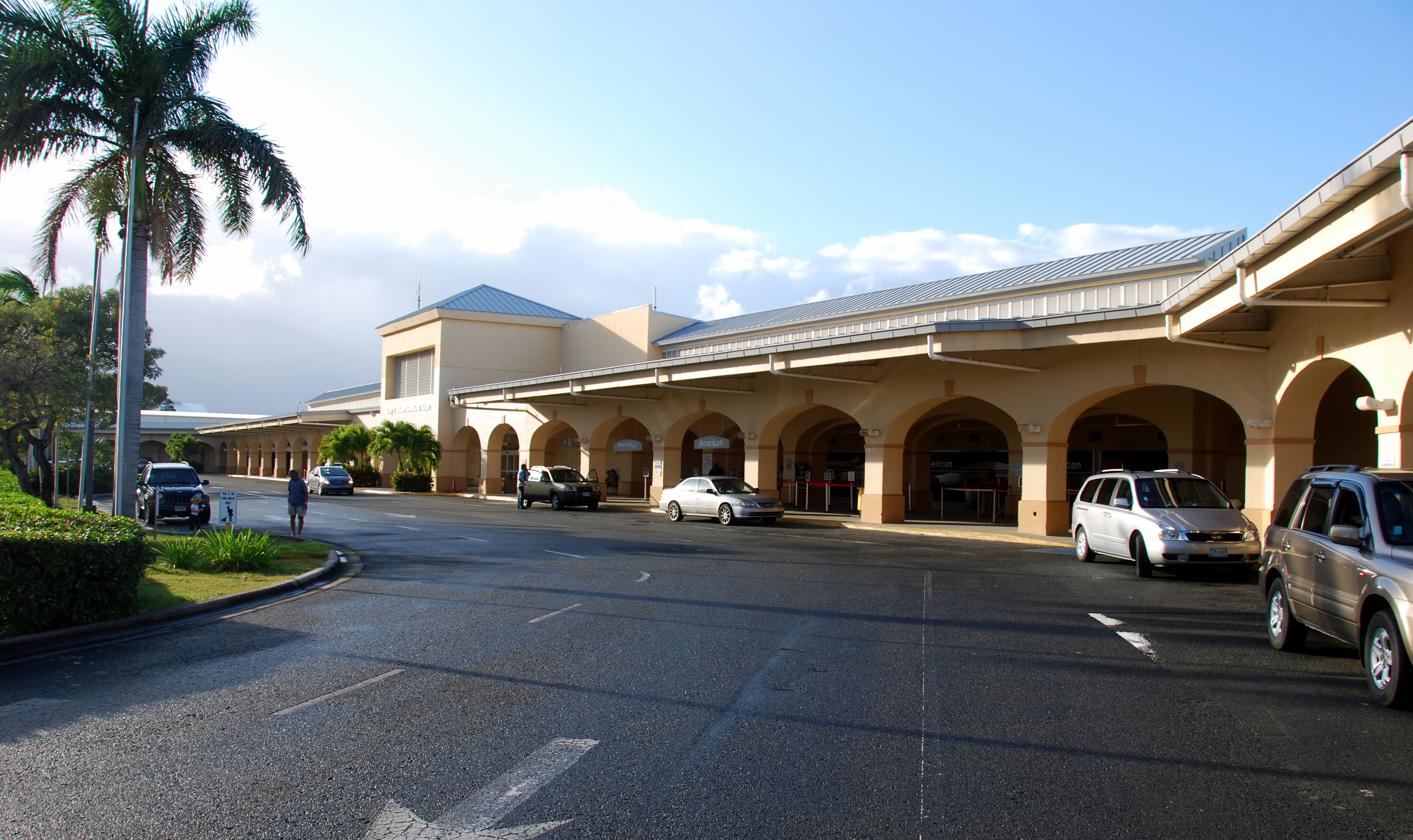
- IATA: STX; ICAO: TISX; FAA LID: STX

Summary
- Airport type: Public
- Owner: Virgin Islands Port Authority
- Serves: St. Croix, United States Virgin Islands
- Elevation AMSL: 74 ft (23 m)
- Coordinates: 17°42′16″N 064°48′06″W
- Website: www.viport.com/herastx

Maps
- FAA airport diagram
- Interactive map of Henry E. Rohlsen Airport

Runways
Direction	Length		Surface
Direction	ft	m	Surface
10/28	10,002	3,049	Asphalt

Statistics (2025)
- Total passengers: 527,000
- Aircraft movements: 31,547
- Based aircraft: 37
- Source: Federal Aviation Administration

Henry E. Rohlsen Airport (IATA: STX, ICAO: TISX, FAA LID: STX) is a public airport six miles (10 km) southwest of Christiansted on the island of St. Croix in the United States Virgin Islands. The airport is named after Henry E. Rohlsen, a St. Croix native who was one of the Tuskegee Airmen during World War II.

The airport, which was a hub for Aero Virgin Islands in the 1970s and 1980s, can receive jets up to the size of the Boeing 747s. Before 1996 the airport was known as Alexander Hamilton International Airport.

== History ==
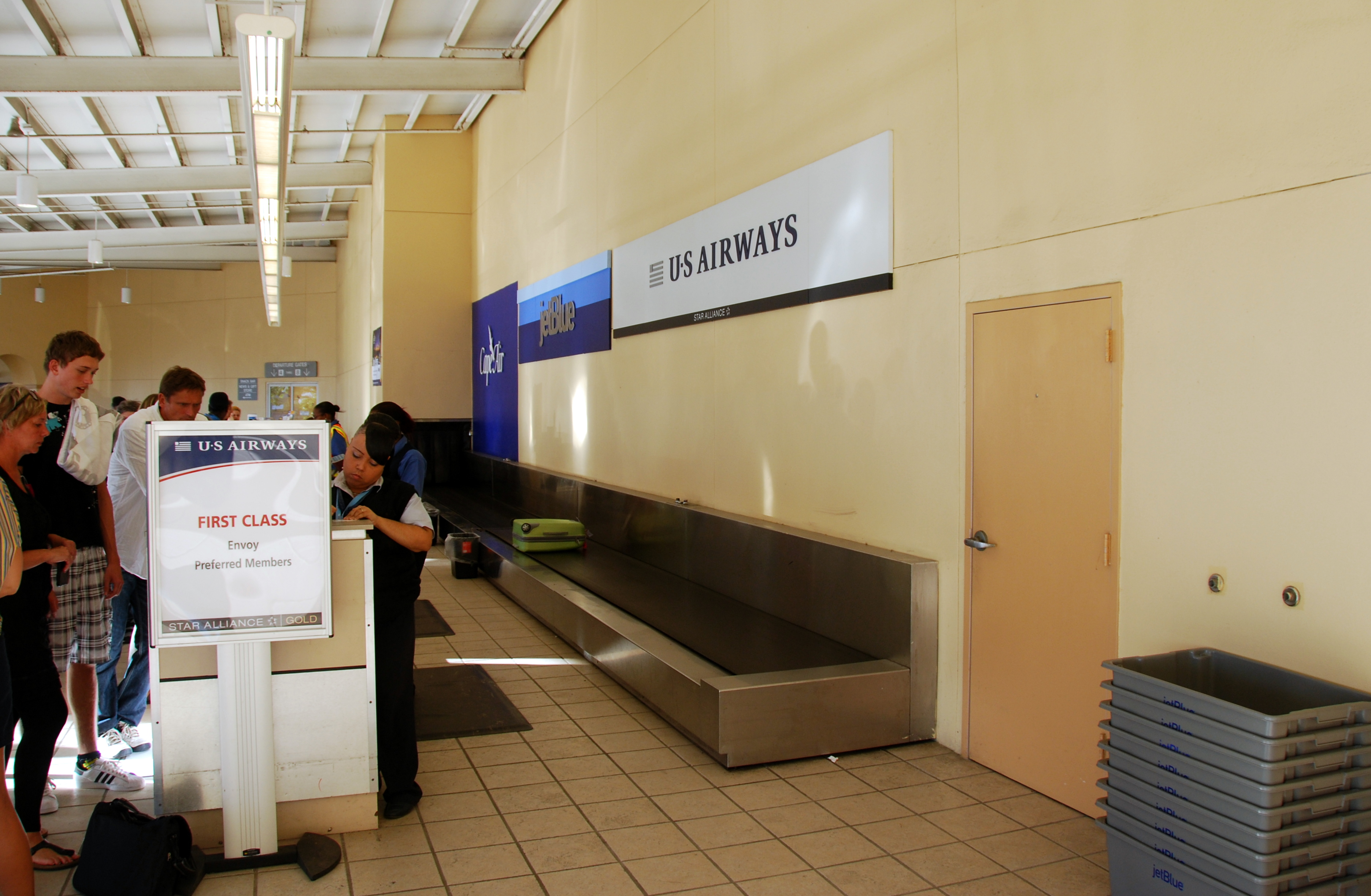
Check-in area

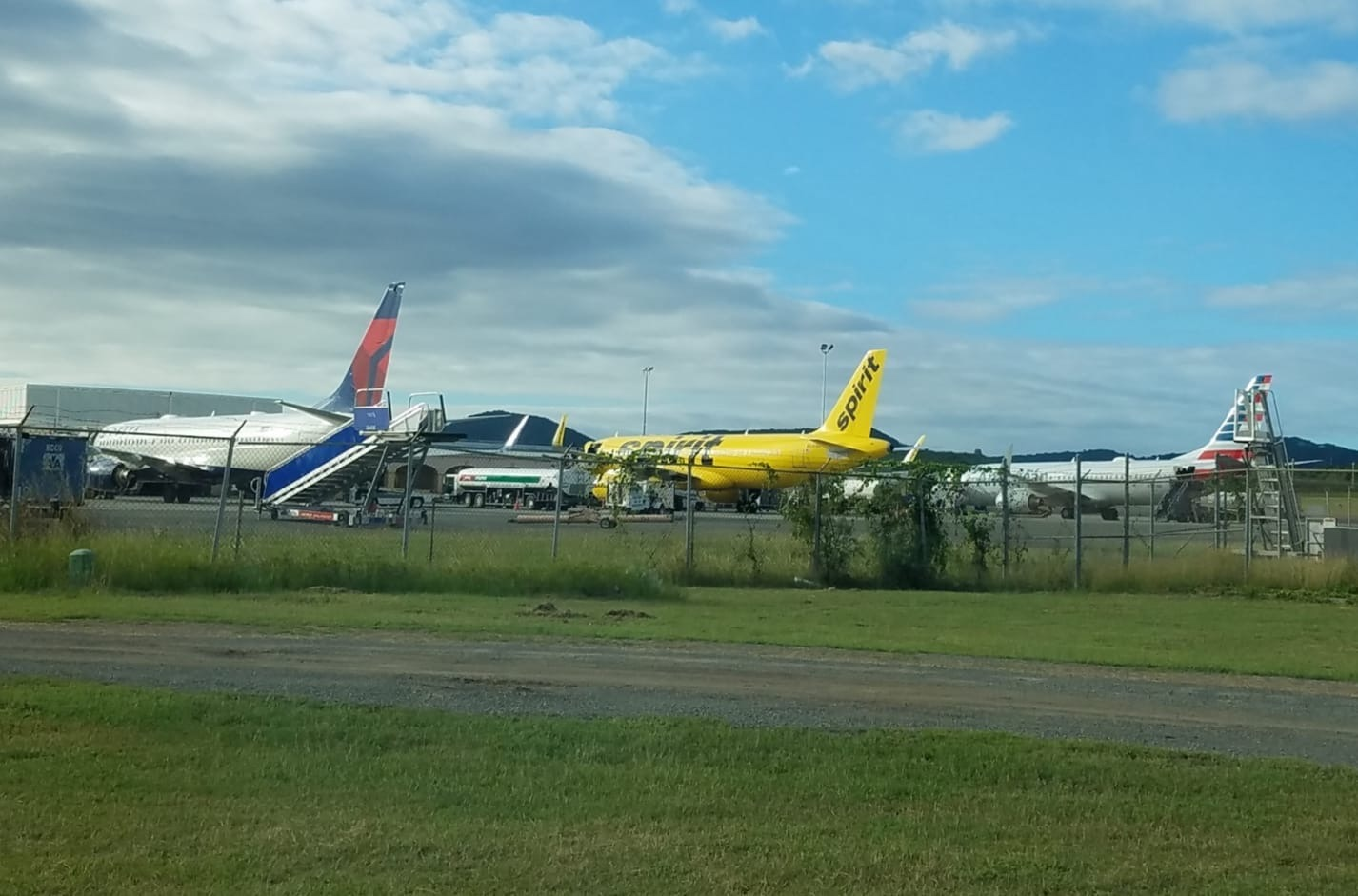
Apron view

During World War II, the United States Army Air Forces Sixth Air Force stationed the 12th Bombardment Squadron (25th Bombardment Group) at the airport for antisubmarine patrols flying B-18 Bolo aircraft from November 8, 1941, to November 10, 1942. During the time the military operated the airport, it was called Benedict Airfield. When the airport was transferred to civilian control, it was renamed to honor former St. Croix resident Alexander Hamilton.

Several airlines have operated scheduled passenger jet service to St. Croix in the past, including Air Florida with Douglas DC-9-10s, Caribair with McDonnell Douglas DC-9-30s, Continental Airlines with Boeing 727-200s, Eastern Airlines with Boeing 727-100s, 727-200s and 757-200s, Midway Airlines with Boeing 737-200s, Pan Am with Boeing 727-200s as well as wide-body Airbus A300B4s, and Trans Caribbean Airways with Boeing 727-200s. American Airlines has served St. Croix for many years. In 1974, American served the airport with Boeing 707 and Boeing 727-100 jetliners with nonstop flights to New York City. In 1994, American operated Airbus A300-600R wide-body jets into St. Croix with nonstop service to Miami. A Boeing 747 carrying relief supplies during the aftermath of Hurricane Marilyn landed at the airport in 1995. Satellite imagery shows the presence of C-17 and C-130 military transports in 2006 and 2015.

On November 11, 2018, the world's second-largest cargo airplane, the Antonov An-124, landed on St. Croix to deliver building supplies for houses as part of the hurricane recovery.

== Facilities and aircraft ==
Henry E. Rohlsen Airport covers an area of 1,455 acres (589 ha), which contains one asphalt-paved runway (10/28) measuring 10,002 ft × 150 ft (3,049 m × 46 m). For the 12-month period ending September 30, 2013, the airport had 36,287 aircraft operations, an average of 99 per day: 68% air taxi, 25% general aviation, 6% scheduled commercial and 1% military. In the same period, 36 aircraft were based at this airport, including 11 single-engine, 15 multi-engine, five jets, four military aircraft and one helicopter.

=== Terminal modernization and expansion project ===
In August 2018, the Virgin Islands Port Authority (VIPA) held a charrette to announce and discuss the terminal's expansion and renovation. On March 14, 2019, the VIPA announced that bidding for phase one of the upgrade project would be in September. The renovation was expected to be complete within a year.

VIPA had begun the Henry E. Rohlsen Airport Terminal Expansion and Modernization Project as of September 2020. The improvements to the terminal will be completed in four phases over a six-year period.

Phase one entails enclosing 5,500 square feet of walkway space to increase the lounge's seating capacity, refurbishing the existing passenger lounge space and restrooms, enclosing the 1,100-square-foot open-air gardens with a new roof structure to provide additional concessions space, and upgrading the mechanical systems for the additional air-conditioned area.

Phase one is estimated to cost $8.6 million and was funded by a $7 million grant from the U.S. Department of Commerce Economic Development Administration in 2019 with a local match of $1.6 million from the VI Port Authority. The construction was anticipated to take 18 months and end in March 2022, but was ahead of schedule and ended on December 21, 2021.

Phases two through four include the addition of a second level to accommodate jet bridges, additional hold room, concession and retail space, improvement of passenger flow and baggage handling in the terminal; redesign, expansion, and modernization of the interior of the terminal to make the best use of the existing floor plan; the addition of tropical landscaping; and changes to improve the flow of vehicular traffic. Expanding the terminal will allow St. Croix to take full advantage of its 10,000-foot runway.

While Phase 1 of the HERA Terminal Expansion is fully funded, VIPA is actively seeking funding sources for Phases 2 through 4. The project is estimated to cost $140 million.

== Airlines and destinations ==
=== Passenger ===
Airlines	Destinations
American Airlines	Miami; Seasonal: Charlotte, Chicago–O'Hare
Cape Air	Nevis, Saint Thomas, San Juan
Delta Air Lines	Seasonal: Atlanta
Fly The Whale	Saint Thomas, San Juan
JetBlue	San Juan
Sky High	Seasonal: Santo Domingo–Las Américas
United Airlines	Seasonal: Newark

Destination map
Destinations from Henry E. Rohlsen Airport (STX)
Red = Year-round destination
Green = Seasonal destination
Blue = Future destination

Destination map - regional
Destinations from Henry E. Rohlsen Airport (STX)
Red = Year-round destination
Green = Seasonal destination
Blue = Future destination

=== Cargo ===
Airlines	Destinations
DHL Aviation	San Juan
FedEx Feeder	San Juan

== Statistics ==
=== Top destinations ===
Busiest domestic routes from STX (May 2025 – April 2026)
Rank	Airport	Passengers	Carriers
1	Miami, Florida	100,550	American
2	(United States Virgin Islands) Saint Thomas, U.S. Virgin Islands	52,090	Cape Air, Sea Flight, Fly The Whale
3	San Juan, Puerto Rico	45,320	Cape Air, Fly The Whale, JetBlue
4	Fort Lauderdale, Florida	22,230	Spirit
5	(Georgia (U.S. state)) Atlanta, Georgia	17,060	Delta
6	Charlotte, North Carolina	17,000	American
6	Chicago–O'Hare, Illinois	2,040	American
7	San Juan–Isla Grande, Puerto Rico	1,420	Fly The Whale

=== Airline market share ===
Largest airlines at STX (May 2025 – April 2026)
Rank	Airline	Passengers	Share
1	American Airlines	239,000	46.49%
2	Fly The Whale	68,230	13.25%
3	JetBlue	64,950	12.51%
4	Spirit Airlines	43,570	8.46%
5	Cape Air	42,710	8.29%
	Other	56,100	10.89%

== Accidents and incidents ==
- On July 24, 1979, Prinair Flight 610 crashed shortly after takeoff from Alexander Hamilton Airport. One crew member and seven passengers were killed.
- On December 7, 2017, at about 8:54 p.m., a private plane, a Beech Baron on its way to St. Thomas, had to return to St. Croix due to an emergency and crashed before it could make it to the runway, resulting in five fatalities. A preliminary investigation revealed that engine failure caused the crash. It was also revealed that the pilot operating the aircraft was unqualified to fly multi-engine airplanes.
