= List of defunct airlines of the United States =

The following is a list of defunct airlines of the United States. However, some of these airlines have ceased operations completely, changed identities and/or FAA certificates and are still operating under a different name (e.g. America West Airlines changed to use the identity of US Airways in 2005 – which itself also changed identity to American Airlines in 2015).

For reasons of size, this article is broken into four parts:

- List of defunct airlines of the United States (A–C)
- List of defunct airlines of the United States (D–I)
- List of defunct airlines of the United States (J–P)
- List of defunct airlines of the United States (Q–Z)

== See also ==
- List of airlines of the United States
- List of airports in the United States
- List of defunct airlines of Guam
- List of defunct airlines of Puerto Rico
- List of defunct airlines of the United States Virgin Islands
