= List of the busiest airports in Puerto Rico =

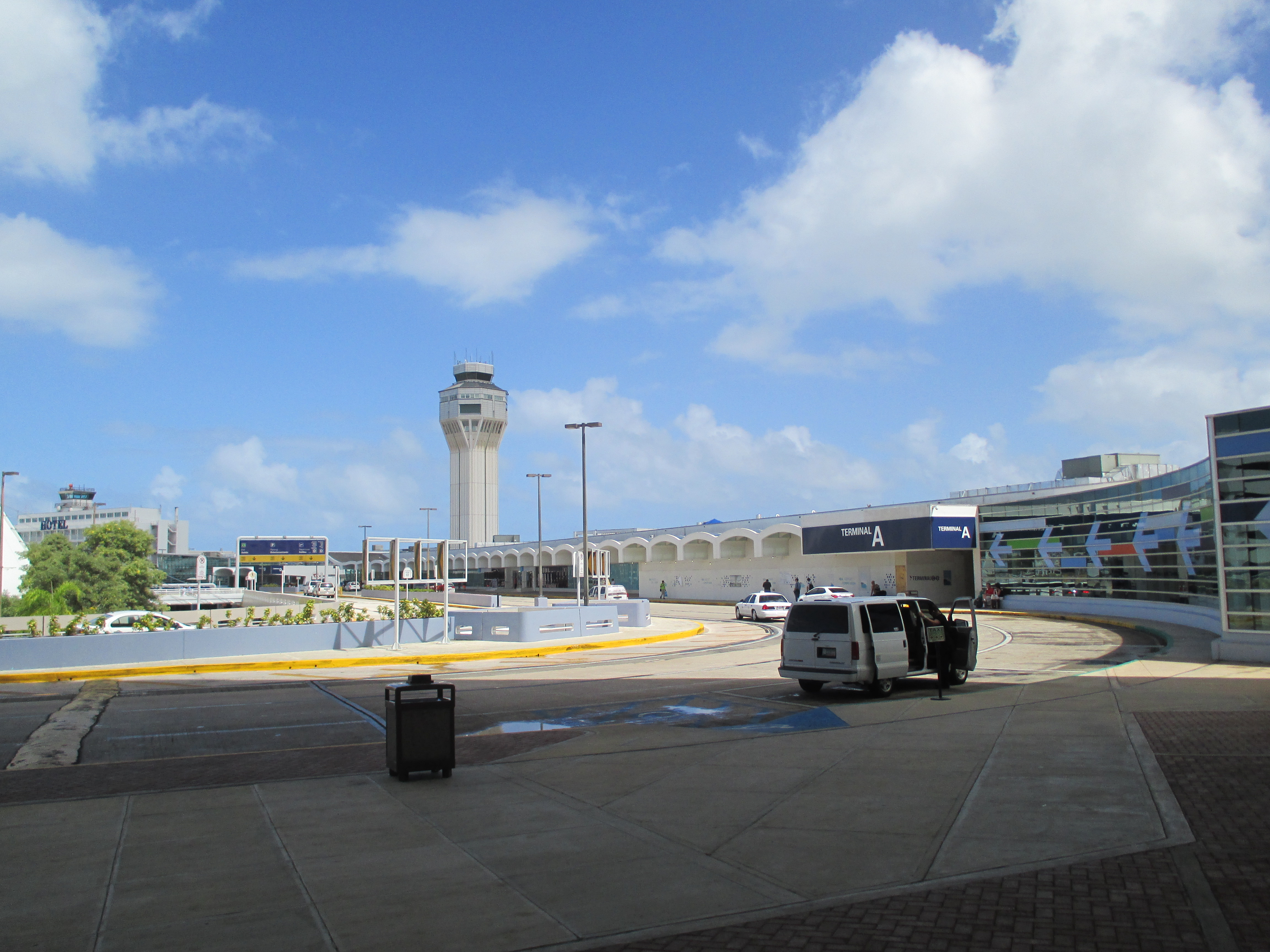
Luis Muñoz Marín International Airport, currently the busiest airport in Puerto Rico and the insular Caribbean by total passenger traffic

This is a list of the busiest airports in Puerto Rico by passenger traffic, international passenger traffic, cargo throughput, and aircraft operations. Including all commercial and general aviation airports in the archipelago and island, the ranking is ordered according to total movement per calendar year based on the statistics provided by the U.S. Department of Transportation, the Puerto Rico Ports Authority, and the Grupo Aeroportuario del Sureste, operator of the Luis Muñoz Marín International Airport.

== Map ==
Commercial and General Aviation Airports
Red dot represents Luis Muñoz Marín International Airport (SJU) (main domestic and international airport with scheduled commercial service to the Caribbean, North, Central, and South America, and Europe)
Brown dot represents Fernando Luis Ribas Dominicci Airport (SIG) (domestic and international airport with scheduled commercial service within Puerto Rico handling private international flights)
Blue dots represent Rafael Hernández International Airport (BQN) and Mercedita International Airport (PSE) (domestic airports with scheduled commercial service to the contiguous United States)
Green dots represent Eugenio María de Hostos Airport (MAZ), José Aponte de la Torre Airport (NRR), Antonio Rivera Rodríguez Airport (VQS), and Benjamín Rivera Noriega Airport (CPX) (domestic airports with scheduled commercial service within Puerto Rico)
Orange dots represent Antonio (Nery) Juarbe Pol Airport (ARE) and Dr. Hermenegildo Ortiz Quiñones Airport (HUC) (general aviation airports without commercial service)

== Total passenger traffic ==
This list includes all yearly passengers per airport, counting domestic and international arrivals and departures.

=== Summary ===
==== 2024–2001 ====
	Airport	IATA/ICAO	City	Total passengers (domestic and international arrivals and departures)																							
	Airport	IATA/ICAO	City	2024	2023	2022	2021	2020	2019	2018	2017	2016	2015	2014	2013	2012	2011	2010	2009	2008	2007	2006	2005	2004	2003	2002	2001
1	Luis Muñoz Marín International Airport	SJU/TJSJ	San Juan	13,247,382	12,197,553	10,310,990	9,684,227	4,845,353	9,448,253	8,373,679	8,407,404	9,032,627	8,733,161	8,569,622	8,347,119	8,448,172	7,993,381	8,491,257	8,245,895	9,378,924	10,409,464	10,506,118	10,768,698	10,568,986	9,716,687	9,389,232	9,453,564
2	Rafael Hernández International Airport	BQN/TJBQ	Aguadilla	738,766	869,942	699,525	461,227	149,162	753,996	608,352	498,424	519,603	412,565	428,413	407,664	432,651	471,226	490,103	461,506	492,180	400,473	356,145	253,730	230,976	132,668	80,018	75,754
3	Mercedita International Airport	PSE/TJPS	Ponce	281,901	298,334	230,691	64,198	42,528	218,753	201,260	189,143	231,798	206,815	201,645	200,916	205,647	202,617	207,467	194,942	236,898	249,044	196,445	78,167	20,732	19,681	27,364	40,656
4	Antonio Rivera Rodríguez Airport	VQS/TJVQ	Vieques	81,120	78,989	82,039	84,929	48,251	83,285	70,374	108,414	131,980	156,207	150,843	144,926	150,497	143,064	165,043	145,276	160,326	167,362	165,165	172,132	127,955	112,241	110,042	113,127
5	José Aponte de la Torre Airport	NRR/TJRV	Ceiba	52,351	61,385	68,906	75,768	42,226	63,262	57,202	84,422	97,037	90,593	81,815	82,981	99,966	90,095	119,887	111,004	148,469	—						
6	Benjamín Rivera Noriega Airport	CPX/TJCP	Culebra	39,143 (Note: Does not include the month of June, as no statistics were provided for it.)	49,974	54,959	70,451	32,971	57,748	41,531	64,303	82,612	79,462	73,843	60,859	63,765	51,749	70,595	69,579	75,964	—						
7	Fernando Luis Ribas Dominicci Airport	SIG/TJIG	San Juan	35,871	37,084	38,459	37,754	21,995	36,973	29,110	42,842	50,201	51,131	51,981	51,865	51,887	50,989	105,107	80,785	102,390	109,244	120,973	107,608	62,127	66,202	68,828	59,416
8	Eugenio María de Hostos Airport	MAZ/TJMZ	Mayagüez	20,249	18,849	17,005	12,714	10,015	16,670	16,117	15,281	11,781	13,290	14,499	12,909	13,569	11,866	12,568	16,767	19,447	19,580	19,572	28,194	55,702	55,869	65,858	93,883
9	Antonio (Nery) Juarbe Pol Airport	ARE/TJAB	Arecibo	15,022	13,433	15,074	21,119	11,941	18,248	11,619	14,026	10,139	4,305	8,496	9,744	9,649	4,186	3,969	9,538	10,363	—						
10	Dr. Hermenegildo Ortiz Quiñones Airport	HUC/none	Humacao	1,307	1,844	3,028	3,624	720	490	772	1,000	1,154	3,799	1,389	1,691	1,688	893	1,515	1,976	1,097	—						
Total				14,513,112	13,627,387	11,520,676	10,516,011	5,205,162	10,697,678	9,410,016	9,425,259	10,168,932	9,751,328	9,582,546	9,320,674	9,447,491	9,020,066	9,667,511	9,337,268	10,626,058	11,355,167	11,364,418	11,408,529	11,066,478	10,103,348	9,741,342	9,836,400

=== Yearly ===
==== 2024 ====
	Airport	IATA/ICAO	City	Passengers	Change
1	Luis Muñoz Marín International Airport	SJU/TJSJ	San Juan	13,247,382	▲8.6%
2	Rafael Hernández International Airport	BQN/TJBQ	Aguadilla	738,766	▼ -15.1%
3	Mercedita International Airport	PSE/TJPS	Ponce	281,901	▼ -5.5%
4	Antonio Rivera Rodríguez Airport	VQS/TJVQ	Vieques	81,120	▲2.7%
5	José Aponte de la Torre Airport	NRR/TJRV	Ceiba	52,351	▼ -14.7%
6	Benjamín Rivera Noriega Airport	CPX/TJCP	Culebra	39,143	▼ -21.8%
7	Fernando Luis Ribas Dominicci Airport	SIG/TJIG	San Juan	35,871	▼ -3.3%
8	Eugenio María de Hostos Airport	MAZ/TJMZ	Mayagüez	20,249	▲7.4%
9	Antonio (Nery) Juarbe Pol Airport	ARE/TJAB	Arecibo	15,022	▲11.8%
10	Dr. Hermenegildo Ortiz Quiñones Airport	HUC/none	Humacao	1,307	▼ -29.1%
Total				14,513,112	▲6.5%

==== 2023 ====
	Airport	IATA/ICAO	City	Passengers	Change
1	Luis Muñoz Marín International Airport	SJU/TJSJ	San Juan	12,197,553	▲18.3%
2	Rafael Hernández International Airport	BQN/TJBQ	Aguadilla	869,942	▲24.4%
3	Mercedita International Airport	PSE/TJPS	Ponce	298,334	▲29.3%
4	Antonio Rivera Rodríguez Airport	VQS/TJVQ	Vieques	78,989	▼ -3.7%
5	José Aponte de la Torre Airport	NRR/TJRV	Ceiba	61,385	▼ -10.9%
6	Benjamín Rivera Noriega Airport	CPX/TJCP	Culebra	49,974	▼ -9.1%
7	Fernando Luis Ribas Dominicci Airport	SIG/TJIG	San Juan	37,084	▲3.6%
8	Eugenio María de Hostos Airport	MAZ/TJMZ	Mayagüez	18,849	▲10.8%
9	Antonio (Nery) Juarbe Pol Airport	ARE/TJAB	Arecibo	13,433	▼ -10.9%
10	Dr. Hermenegildo Ortiz Quiñones Airport	HUC/none	Humacao	1,844	▼ -39.1%
Total				13,627,387	▲18.3%

==== 2022 ====
	Airport	IATA/ICAO	City	Passengers	Change
1	Luis Muñoz Marín International Airport	SJU/TJSJ	San Juan	10,310,990	▲6.5%
2	Rafael Hernández International Airport	BQN/TJBQ	Aguadilla	699,525	▲51.7%
3	Mercedita International Airport	PSE/TJPS	Ponce	230,691	▲259.3%
4	Antonio Rivera Rodríguez Airport	VQS/TJVQ	Vieques	82,039	▼ -3.4%
5	José Aponte de la Torre Airport	NRR/TJRV	Ceiba	68,906	▼ -9.1%
6	Benjamín Rivera Noriega Airport	CPX/TJCP	Culebra	54,959	▼ -29.0%
7	Fernando Luis Ribas Dominicci Airport	SIG/TJIG	San Juan	38,459	▲1.9%
8	Eugenio María de Hostos Airport	MAZ/TJMZ	Mayagüez	17,005	▲33.8%
9	Antonio (Nery) Juarbe Pol Airport	ARE/TJAB	Arecibo	15,074	▼ -28.6%
10	Dr. Hermenegildo Ortiz Quiñones Airport	HUC/none	Humacao	3,028	▼ -16.4%
Total				11,520,676	▲9.6%

==== 2021 ====
	Airport	IATA/ICAO	City	Passengers	Change
1	Luis Muñoz Marín International Airport	SJU/TJSJ	San Juan	9,684,227	▲99.9%
2	Rafael Hernández International Airport	BQN/TJBQ	Aguadilla	461,227	▲209.2%
3	Antonio Rivera Rodríguez Airport	VQS/TJVQ	Vieques	84,929	▲76.0%
4	José Aponte de la Torre Airport	NRR/TJRV	Ceiba	75,768	▲79.4%
5	Benjamín Rivera Noriega Airport	CPX/TJCP	Culebra	70,451	▲113.8%
6	Mercedita International Airport	PSE/TJPS	Ponce	64,198	▲51.0%
7	Fernando Luis Ribas Dominicci Airport	SIG/TJIG	San Juan	37,754	▲71.6%
8	Antonio (Nery) Juarbe Pol Airport	ARE/TJAB	Arecibo	21,119	▲76.9%
9	Eugenio María de Hostos Airport	MAZ/TJMZ	Mayagüez	12,714	▲26.9%
10	Dr. Hermenegildo Ortiz Quiñones Airport	HUC/none	Humacao	3,624	▲403.3%
Total				10,516,011	▲102.0%

==== 2020 ====
	Airport	IATA/ICAO	City	Passengers	Change
1	Luis Muñoz Marín International Airport	SJU/TJSJ	San Juan	4,845,353	▼ -48.7%
2	Rafael Hernández International Airport	BQN/TJBQ	Aguadilla	149,162	▼ -80.2%
3	Antonio Rivera Rodríguez Airport	VQS/TJVQ	Vieques	48,251	▼ -42.0%
4	Mercedita International Airport	PSE/TJPS	Ponce	42,528	▼ -80.5%
5	José Aponte de la Torre Airport	NRR/TJRV	Ceiba	42,226	▼ -33.2%
6	Benjamín Rivera Noriega Airport	CPX/TJCP	Culebra	32,971	▼ -42.9%
7	Fernando Luis Ribas Dominicci Airport	SIG/TJIG	San Juan	21,995	▼ -40.5%
8	Antonio (Nery) Juarbe Pol Airport	ARE/TJAB	Arecibo	11,941	▼ -34.5%
9	Eugenio María de Hostos Airport	MAZ/TJMZ	Mayagüez	10,015	▼ -39.9%
10	Dr. Hermenegildo Ortiz Quiñones Airport	HUC/none	Humacao	720	▲68.0%
Total				5,205,162	▼ -51.3%

==== 2019 ====
	Airport	IATA/ICAO	City	Passengers	Change
1	Luis Muñoz Marín International Airport	SJU/TJSJ	San Juan	9,448,253	▲12.8%
2	Rafael Hernández International Airport	BQN/TJBQ	Aguadilla	753,996	▲23.9%
3	Mercedita International Airport	PSE/TJPS	Ponce	218,753	▲8.7%
4	Antonio Rivera Rodríguez Airport	VQS/TJVQ	Vieques	83,285	▲18.3%
5	José Aponte de la Torre Airport	NRR/TJRV	Ceiba	63,262	▲10.6%
6	Benjamín Rivera Noriega Airport	CPX/TJCP	Culebra	57,748	▲39.0%
7	Fernando Luis Ribas Dominicci Airport	SIG/TJIG	San Juan	36,973	▲27.0%
8	Antonio (Nery) Juarbe Pol Airport	ARE/TJAB	Arecibo	18,248	▲57.1%
9	Eugenio María de Hostos Airport	MAZ/TJMZ	Mayagüez	16,670	▲3.4%
10	Dr. Hermenegildo Ortiz Quiñones Airport	HUC/none	Humacao	490	▼ -38.1%
Total				10,697,678	▲13.7%

==== 2018 ====
	Airport	IATA/ICAO	City	Passengers	Change
1	Luis Muñoz Marín International Airport	SJU/TJSJ	San Juan	8,373,679	▼ -0.4%
2	Rafael Hernández International Airport	BQN/TJBQ	Aguadilla	608,352	▲22.1%
3	Mercedita International Airport	PSE/TJPS	Ponce	201,260	▲6.4%
4	Antonio Rivera Rodríguez Airport	VQS/TJVQ	Vieques	70,374	▼ -35.1%
5	José Aponte de la Torre Airport	NRR/TJRV	Ceiba	57,202	▼ -32.2%
6	Benjamín Rivera Noriega Airport	CPX/TJCP	Culebra	41,531	▼ -35.4%
7	Fernando Luis Ribas Dominicci Airport	SIG/TJIG	San Juan	29,110	▼ -32.1%
8	Eugenio María de Hostos Airport	MAZ/TJMZ	Mayagüez	16,117	▲5.5%
9	Antonio (Nery) Juarbe Pol Airport	ARE/TJAB	Arecibo	11,619	▼ -17.2%
10	Dr. Hermenegildo Ortiz Quiñones Airport	HUC/none	Humacao	772	▼ -22.8%
Total				9,410,016	▼- 0.2%

==== 2017 ====
	Airport	IATA/ICAO	City	Passengers	Change
1	Luis Muñoz Marín International Airport	SJU/TJSJ	San Juan	8,407,404	▼ -6.9%
2	Rafael Hernández International Airport	BQN/TJBQ	Aguadilla	498,424	▼ -4.1%
3	Mercedita International Airport	PSE/TJPS	Ponce	189,143	▼ -18.4%
4	Antonio Rivera Rodríguez Airport	VQS/TJVQ	Vieques	108,414	▼ -17.9%
5	José Aponte de la Torre Airport	NRR/TJRV	Ceiba	84,422	▼ -13.0%
6	Benjamín Rivera Noriega Airport	CPX/TJCP	Culebra	64,303	▼ -22.2%
7	Fernando Luis Ribas Dominicci Airport	SIG/TJIG	San Juan	42,842	▼ -14.7%
8	Eugenio María de Hostos Airport	MAZ/TJMZ	Mayagüez	15,281	▲29.7%
9	Antonio (Nery) Juarbe Pol Airport	ARE/TJAB	Arecibo	14,026	▲38.3%
10	Dr. Hermenegildo Ortiz Quiñones Airport	HUC/none	Humacao	1,000	▼ -5.1%
Total				9,425,259	▼ -7.3%

==== 2016 ====
	Airport	IATA/ICAO	City	Passengers	Change
1	Luis Muñoz Marín International Airport	SJU/TJSJ	San Juan	9,032,627	▲3.4%
2	Rafael Hernández International Airport	BQN/TJBQ	Aguadilla	519,603	▲25.9%
3	Mercedita International Airport	PSE/TJPS	Ponce	231,798	▲12.1%
4	Antonio Rivera Rodríguez Airport	VQS/TJVQ	Vieques	131,980	▼ -16.0%
5	José Aponte de la Torre Airport	NRR/TJRV	Ceiba	97,037	▲7.1%
6	Benjamín Rivera Noriega Airport	CPX/TJCP	Culebra	82,612	▲4.0%
7	Fernando Luis Ribas Dominicci Airport	SIG/TJIG	San Juan	50,201	▼ -1.8%
8	Eugenio María de Hostos Airport	MAZ/TJMZ	Mayagüez	11,781	▼ -11.4%
9	Antonio (Nery) Juarbe Pol Airport	ARE/TJAB	Arecibo	10,139	▲135.5%
10	Dr. Hermenegildo Ortiz Quiñones Airport	HUC/none	Humacao	1,154	▼ -69.6%
Total				10,168,932	▲4.3%

==== 2015 ====
	Airport	IATA/ICAO	City	Passengers	Change
1	Luis Muñoz Marín International Airport	SJU/TJSJ	San Juan	8,733,161	▲1.9%
2	Rafael Hernández International Airport	BQN/TJBQ	Aguadilla	412,565	▼ -3.7%
3	Mercedita International Airport	PSE/TJPS	Ponce	206,815	▲2.6%
4	Antonio Rivera Rodríguez Airport	VQS/TJVQ	Vieques	156,207	▲3.6%
5	José Aponte de la Torre Airport	NRR/TJRV	Ceiba	90,593	▲10.7%
6	Benjamín Rivera Noriega Airport	CPX/TJCP	Culebra	79,462	▲8.6%
7	Fernando Luis Ribas Dominicci Airport	SIG/TJIG	San Juan	51,131	▼ -1.6%
8	Eugenio María de Hostos Airport	MAZ/TJMZ	Mayagüez	13,290	▼ -8.3%
9	Antonio (Nery) Juarbe Pol Airport	ARE/TJAB	Arecibo	4,305	▼ -49.3%
10	Dr. Hermenegildo Ortiz Quiñones Airport	HUC/none	Humacao	3,799	▲173.5%
Total				9,751,328	▲1.8%

==== 2014 ====
	Airport	IATA/ICAO	City	Passengers	Change
1	Luis Muñoz Marín International Airport	SJU/TJSJ	San Juan	8,569,622	▲2.7%
2	Rafael Hernández International Airport	BQN/TJBQ	Aguadilla	428,413	▲5.1%
3	Mercedita International Airport	PSE/TJPS	Ponce	201,645	▲0.4%
4	Antonio Rivera Rodríguez Airport	VQS/TJVQ	Vieques	150,843	▲4.1%
5	José Aponte de la Torre Airport	NRR/TJRV	Ceiba	81,815	▼ -1.4%
6	Benjamín Rivera Noriega Airport	CPX/TJCP	Culebra	73,843	▲21.3%
7	Fernando Luis Ribas Dominicci Airport	SIG/TJIG	San Juan	51,981	▲0.2%
8	Eugenio María de Hostos Airport	MAZ/TJMZ	Mayagüez	14,499	▲11.9%
9	Antonio (Nery) Juarbe Pol Airport	ARE/TJAB	Arecibo	8,496	▼ -12.8%
10	Dr. Hermenegildo Ortiz Quiñones Airport	HUC/none	Humacao	1,389	▼ -17.9%
Total				9,582,546	▲2.8%

==== 2013 ====
	Airport	IATA/ICAO	City	Passengers	Change
1	Luis Muñoz Marín International Airport	SJU/TJSJ	San Juan	8,347,119	▼ -1.2%
2	Rafael Hernández International Airport	BQN/TJBQ	Aguadilla	407,664	▼ -5.8%
3	Mercedita International Airport	PSE/TJPS	Ponce	200,916	▼ -2.3%
4	Antonio Rivera Rodríguez Airport	VQS/TJVQ	Vieques	144,926	▼ -3.7%
5	José Aponte de la Torre Airport	NRR/TJRV	Ceiba	82,981	▼ -17.0%
6	Benjamín Rivera Noriega Airport	CPX/TJCP	Culebra	60,859	▼ -4.5%
7	Fernando Luis Ribas Dominicci Airport	SIG/TJIG	San Juan	51,865	0.0%
8	Eugenio María de Hostos Airport	MAZ/TJMZ	Mayagüez	12,909	▼ -4.7%
9	Antonio (Nery) Juarbe Pol Airport	ARE/TJAB	Arecibo	9,744	▲1.0%
10	Dr. Hermenegildo Ortiz Quiñones Airport	HUC/none	Humacao	1,691	▼ -0.2%
Total				9,320,674	▼ -1.3%

==== 2012 ====
	Airport	IATA/ICAO	City	Passengers	Change
1	Luis Muñoz Marín International Airport	SJU/TJSJ	San Juan	8,448,172	▲5.7%
2	Rafael Hernández International Airport	BQN/TJBQ	Aguadilla	432,651	▼ -8.2%
3	Mercedita International Airport	PSE/TJPS	Ponce	205,647	▲1.5%
4	Antonio Rivera Rodríguez Airport	VQS/TJVQ	Vieques	150,497	▲ -5.2%
5	José Aponte de la Torre Airport	NRR/TJRV	Ceiba	99,966	▲11.0%
6	Benjamín Rivera Noriega Airport	CPX/TJCP	Culebra	63,765	▲23.2%
7	Fernando Luis Ribas Dominicci Airport	SIG/TJIG	San Juan	51,887	▲1.8%
8	Eugenio María de Hostos Airport	MAZ/TJMZ	Mayagüez	13,569	▲14.4%
9	Antonio (Nery) Juarbe Pol Airport	ARE/TJAB	Arecibo	9,649	▲130.5%
10	Dr. Hermenegildo Ortiz Quiñones Airport	HUC/none	Humacao	1,688	▲89.0%
Total				9,447,491	▲4.7%

==== 2011 ====
	Airport	IATA/ICAO	City	Passengers	Change
1	Luis Muñoz Marín International Airport	SJU/TJSJ	San Juan	7,993,381	▼ -5.9%
2	Rafael Hernández International Airport	BQN/TJBQ	Aguadilla	471,226	▼ -3.9%
3	Mercedita International Airport	PSE/TJPS	Ponce	202,617	▼ -2.3%
4	Antonio Rivera Rodríguez Airport	VQS/TJVQ	Vieques	143,064	▼ -13.3%
5	José Aponte de la Torre Airport	NRR/TJRV	Ceiba	90,095	▼ -24.9%
6	Benjamín Rivera Noriega Airport	CPX/TJCP	Culebra	51,749	▼ -26.7%
7	Fernando Luis Ribas Dominicci Airport	SIG/TJIG	San Juan	50,989	▼ -51.5%
8	Eugenio María de Hostos Airport	MAZ/TJMZ	Mayagüez	11,866	▼ -5.6%
9	Antonio (Nery) Juarbe Pol Airport	ARE/TJAB	Arecibo	4,186	▲5.5%
10	Dr. Hermenegildo Ortiz Quiñones Airport	HUC/none	Humacao	893	▼ -41.1%
Total				9,020,066	▼ -6.7%

==== 2010 ====
	Airport	IATA/ICAO	City	Passengers	Change
1	Luis Muñoz Marín International Airport	SJU/TJSJ	San Juan	8,491,257	▲3.0%
2	Rafael Hernández International Airport	BQN/TJBQ	Aguadilla	490,103	▲6.2%
3	Mercedita International Airport	PSE/TJPS	Ponce	207,467	▲6.4%
4	Antonio Rivera Rodríguez Airport	VQS/TJVQ	Vieques	165,043	▲13.6%
5	José Aponte de la Torre Airport	NRR/TJRV	Ceiba	119,887	▲8.0%
6	Fernando Luis Ribas Dominicci Airport	SIG/TJIG	San Juan	105,107	▲30.1%
7	Benjamín Rivera Noriega Airport	CPX/TJCP	Culebra	70,595	▲1.5%
8	Eugenio María de Hostos Airport	MAZ/TJMZ	Mayagüez	12,568	▼ -25.0%
9	Antonio (Nery) Juarbe Pol Airport	ARE/TJAB	Arecibo	3,969	▼ -58.4%
10	Dr. Hermenegildo Ortiz Quiñones Airport	HUC/none	Humacao	1,515	▼ -23.3%
Total				9,667,511	▲3.5%

==== 2009 ====
	Airport	IATA/ICAO	City	Passengers	Change
1	Luis Muñoz Marín International Airport	SJU/TJSJ	San Juan	8,245,895	▼ -12.1%
2	Rafael Hernández International Airport	BQN/TJBQ	Aguadilla	461,506	▼ -6.2%
3	Mercedita International Airport	PSE/TJPS	Ponce	194,942	▼ -17.7%
4	Antonio Rivera Rodríguez Airport	VQS/TJVQ	Vieques	145,276	▼ -9.4%
5	José Aponte de la Torre Airport	NRR/TJRV	Ceiba	111,004	▼ -25.2%
6	Fernando Luis Ribas Dominicci Airport	SIG/TJIG	San Juan	80,785	▼ -21.1%
7	Benjamín Rivera Noriega Airport	CPX/TJCP	Culebra	69,579	▼ -8.4%
8	Eugenio María de Hostos Airport	MAZ/TJMZ	Mayagüez	16,767	▼ -13.9%
9	Antonio (Nery) Juarbe Pol Airport	ARE/TJAB	Arecibo	9,538	▼ -8.0%
10	Dr. Hermenegildo Ortiz Quiñones Airport	HUC/none	Humacao	1,976	▲80.1%
Total				9,337,268	▼ -12.1%

==== 2008 ====
	Airport	IATA/ICAO	City	Passengers	Change
1	Luis Muñoz Marín International Airport	SJU/TJSJ	San Juan	9,378,924	▼ -9.9%
2	Rafael Hernández International Airport	BQN/TJBQ	Aguadilla	492,180	▲22.9%
3	Mercedita International Airport	PSE/TJPS	Ponce	236,898	▼ -4.9%
4	Antonio Rivera Rodríguez Airport	VQS/TJVQ	Vieques	160,326	▼ -4.2%
5	José Aponte de la Torre Airport	NRR/TJRV	Ceiba	148,469	—
6	Fernando Luis Ribas Dominicci Airport	SIG/TJIG	San Juan	102,390	▼ -6.3%
7	Benjamín Rivera Noriega Airport	CPX/TJCP	Culebra	75,964	—
8	Eugenio María de Hostos Airport	MAZ/TJMZ	Mayagüez	19,447	▼ -0.8%
9	Antonio (Nery) Juarbe Pol Airport	ARE/TJAB	Arecibo	10,363	—
10	Dr. Hermenegildo Ortiz Quiñones Airport	HUC/none	Humacao	1,097	—
Total				10,626,058	▼ -6.4%

==== 2007 ====
	Airport	IATA/ICAO	City	Passengers	Change
1	Luis Muñoz Marín International Airport	SJU/TJSJ	San Juan	10,409,464	▼ -0.9%
2	Rafael Hernández International Airport	BQN/TJBQ	Aguadilla	400,473	▲12.4%
3	Mercedita International Airport	PSE/TJPS	Ponce	249,044	▲26.8%
4	Antonio Rivera Rodríguez Airport	VQS/TJVQ	Vieques	167,362	▲1.3%
5	José Aponte de la Torre Airport	NRR/TJRV	Ceiba	—	
6	Fernando Luis Ribas Dominicci Airport	SIG/TJIG	San Juan	109,244	▼ -9.7%
7	Benjamín Rivera Noriega Airport	CPX/TJCP	Culebra	—	
8	Eugenio María de Hostos Airport	MAZ/TJMZ	Mayagüez	19,580	0.0%
9	Antonio (Nery) Juarbe Pol Airport	ARE/TJAB	Arecibo	—	
10	Dr. Hermenegildo Ortiz Quiñones Airport	HUC/none	Humacao	—	
Total				11,355,167	▼ -0.1%

==== 2006 ====
	Airport	IATA/ICAO	City	Passengers	Change
1	Luis Muñoz Marín International Airport	SJU/TJSJ	San Juan	10,506,118	▼ -2.4%
2	Rafael Hernández International Airport	BQN/TJBQ	Aguadilla	356,145	▲40.4%
3	Mercedita International Airport	PSE/TJPS	Ponce	196,445	▲151.3%
4	Antonio Rivera Rodríguez Airport	VQS/TJVQ	Vieques	165,165	▼ -4.0%
5	José Aponte de la Torre Airport	NRR/TJRV	Ceiba	—	
6	Fernando Luis Ribas Dominicci Airport	SIG/TJIG	San Juan	120,973	▲12.4%
7	Benjamín Rivera Noriega Airport	CPX/TJCP	Culebra	—	
8	Eugenio María de Hostos Airport	MAZ/TJMZ	Mayagüez	19,572	▼ -30.6%
9	Antonio (Nery) Juarbe Pol Airport	ARE/TJAB	Arecibo	—	
10	Dr. Hermenegildo Ortiz Quiñones Airport	HUC/none	Humacao	—	
Total				11,364,418	▼ -0.4%

==== 2005 ====
	Airport	IATA/ICAO	City	Passengers	Change
1	Luis Muñoz Marín International Airport	SJU/TJSJ	San Juan	10,768,698	▲1.9%
2	Rafael Hernández International Airport	BQN/TJBQ	Aguadilla	253,730	▲9.9%
3	Mercedita International Airport	PSE/TJPS	Ponce	78,167	▲277.0%
4	Antonio Rivera Rodríguez Airport	VQS/TJVQ	Vieques	172,132	▲134.5%
5	José Aponte de la Torre Airport	NRR/TJRV	Ceiba	—	
6	Fernando Luis Ribas Dominicci Airport	SIG/TJIG	San Juan	107,608	▲73.2%
7	Benjamín Rivera Noriega Airport	CPX/TJCP	Culebra	—	
8	Eugenio María de Hostos Airport	MAZ/TJMZ	Mayagüez	28,194	▼ -49.4%
9	Antonio (Nery) Juarbe Pol Airport	ARE/TJAB	Arecibo	—	
10	Dr. Hermenegildo Ortiz Quiñones Airport	HUC/none	Humacao	—	
Total				11,408,529	▲3.1%

==== 2004 ====
	Airport	IATA/ICAO	City	Passengers	Change
1	Luis Muñoz Marín International Airport	SJU/TJSJ	San Juan	10,568,986	▲8.8%
2	Rafael Hernández International Airport	BQN/TJBQ	Aguadilla	230,976	▲74.1%
3	Mercedita International Airport	PSE/TJPS	Ponce	20,732	▲5.3%
4	Antonio Rivera Rodríguez Airport	VQS/TJVQ	Vieques	127,955	▲14.0%
5	José Aponte de la Torre Airport	NRR/TJRV	Ceiba	—	
6	Fernando Luis Ribas Dominicci Airport	SIG/TJIG	San Juan	62,127	▼ -6.2%
7	Benjamín Rivera Noriega Airport	CPX/TJCP	Culebra	—	
8	Eugenio María de Hostos Airport	MAZ/TJMZ	Mayagüez	55,702	▼ -0.3%
9	Antonio (Nery) Juarbe Pol Airport	ARE/TJAB	Arecibo	—	
10	Dr. Hermenegildo Ortiz Quiñones Airport	HUC/none	Humacao	—	
Total				11,066,478	▲9.5%

==== 2003 ====
	Airport	IATA/ICAO	City	Passengers	Change
1	Luis Muñoz Marín International Airport	SJU/TJSJ	San Juan	9,716,687	▲3.5%
2	Rafael Hernández International Airport	BQN/TJBQ	Aguadilla	132,668	▲65.8%
3	Mercedita International Airport	PSE/TJPS	Ponce	19,681	▼ -28.1%
4	Antonio Rivera Rodríguez Airport	VQS/TJVQ	Vieques	112,241	▲2.0%
5	José Aponte de la Torre Airport	NRR/TJRV	Ceiba	—	
6	Fernando Luis Ribas Dominicci Airport	SIG/TJIG	San Juan	66,202	▼ -3.8%
7	Benjamín Rivera Noriega Airport	CPX/TJCP	Culebra	—	
8	Eugenio María de Hostos Airport	MAZ/TJMZ	Mayagüez	55,869	▼ -15.2%
9	Antonio (Nery) Juarbe Pol Airport	ARE/TJAB	Arecibo	—	
10	Dr. Hermenegildo Ortiz Quiñones Airport	HUC/none	Humacao	—	
Total				10,103,348	▲3.7%

==== 2002 ====
	Airport	IATA/ICAO	City	Passengers	Change
1	Luis Muñoz Marín International Airport	SJU/TJSJ	San Juan	9,389,232	▼ -0.7%
2	Rafael Hernández International Airport	BQN/TJBQ	Aguadilla	80,018	▲5.6%
3	Mercedita International Airport	PSE/TJPS	Ponce	27,364	▼ -32.7%
4	Antonio Rivera Rodríguez Airport	VQS/TJVQ	Vieques	110,042	▼ -2.8%
5	José Aponte de la Torre Airport	NRR/TJRV	Ceiba	—	
6	Fernando Luis Ribas Dominicci Airport	SIG/TJIG	San Juan	68,828	▲15.8%
7	Benjamín Rivera Noriega Airport	CPX/TJCP	Culebra	—	
8	Eugenio María de Hostos Airport	MAZ/TJMZ	Mayagüez	65,858	▼ -29.9%
9	Antonio (Nery) Juarbe Pol Airport	ARE/TJAB	Arecibo	—	
10	Dr. Hermenegildo Ortiz Quiñones Airport	HUC/none	Humacao	—	
Total				9,741,342	▼ -1.0%

==== 2001 ====
	Airport	IATA/ICAO	City	Passengers	Change
1	Luis Muñoz Marín International Airport	SJU/TJSJ	San Juan	9,453,564	—
2	Rafael Hernández International Airport	BQN/TJBQ	Aguadilla	75,754	—
3	Mercedita International Airport	PSE/TJPS	Ponce	40,656	—
4	Antonio Rivera Rodríguez Airport	VQS/TJVQ	Vieques	113,127	—
5	José Aponte de la Torre Airport	NRR/TJRV	Ceiba	—	
6	Fernando Luis Ribas Dominicci Airport	SIG/TJIG	San Juan	59,416	—
7	Benjamín Rivera Noriega Airport	CPX/TJCP	Culebra	—	
8	Eugenio María de Hostos Airport	MAZ/TJMZ	Mayagüez	93,883	—
9	Antonio (Nery) Juarbe Pol Airport	ARE/TJAB	Arecibo	—	
10	Dr. Hermenegildo Ortiz Quiñones Airport	HUC/none	Humacao	—	
Total				9,836,400	—

== International passenger traffic ==
This list includes yearly international passengers per airport, counting international arrivals and departures based outside the United States and its territories.

=== Summary ===
==== 2024–1999 ====
	Airport	IATA/ICAO	City	International passengers (international arrivals and departures based outside the United States and its territories)																									
	Airport	IATA/ICAO	City	2024	2023	2022	2021	2020	2019	2018	2017	2016	2015	2014	2013	2012	2011	2010	2009	2008	2007	2006	2005	2004	2003	2002	2001	2000	1999
1	Luis Muñoz Marín International Airport	SJU/TJSJ	San Juan	1,458,172	1,158,996	802,613	468,287	253,114	866,088	780,300	825,630	922,147	758,155	918,408	897,983	1,085,514	—	—	1,165,457	1,479,011	1,842,525	1,970,042	1,943,139	1,910,013	1,872,040	1,974,102	2,377,045	2,383,510	2,234,020

=== Yearly ===
==== 2024 ====
	Airport	IATA/ICAO	City	Passengers	Change
1	Luis Muñoz Marín International Airport	SJU/TJSJ	San Juan	1,458,172	▲25.8%

==== 2023 ====
	Airport	IATA/ICAO	City	Passengers	Change
1	Luis Muñoz Marín International Airport	SJU/TJSJ	San Juan	1,158,996	▲44.4%

==== 2022 ====
	Airport	IATA/ICAO	City	Passengers	Change
1	Luis Muñoz Marín International Airport	SJU/TJSJ	San Juan	802,613	▲71.4%

==== 2021 ====
	Airport	IATA/ICAO	City	Passengers	Change
1	Luis Muñoz Marín International Airport	SJU/TJSJ	San Juan	468,287	▲85.0%

==== 2020 ====
	Airport	IATA/ICAO	City	Passengers	Change
1	Luis Muñoz Marín International Airport	SJU/TJSJ	San Juan	253,114	▼ -70.8%

==== 2019 ====
	Airport	IATA/ICAO	City	Passengers	Change
1	Luis Muñoz Marín International Airport	SJU/TJSJ	San Juan	866,088	▲11.0%

==== 2018 ====
	Airport	IATA/ICAO	City	Passengers	Change
1	Luis Muñoz Marín International Airport	SJU/TJSJ	San Juan	780,300	▼ -5.5%

==== 2017 ====
	Airport	IATA/ICAO	City	Passengers	Change
1	Luis Muñoz Marín International Airport	SJU/TJSJ	San Juan	825,630	▼ -10.5%

==== 2016 ====
	Airport	IATA/ICAO	City	Passengers	Change
1	Luis Muñoz Marín International Airport	SJU/TJSJ	San Juan	922,147	▲21.6%

==== 2015 ====
	Airport	IATA/ICAO	City	Passengers	Change
1	Luis Muñoz Marín International Airport	SJU/TJSJ	San Juan	758,155	▼ -17.4%

==== 2014 ====
	Airport	IATA/ICAO	City	Passengers	Change
1	Luis Muñoz Marín International Airport	SJU/TJSJ	San Juan	918,408	▲2.3%

==== 2013 ====
	Airport	IATA/ICAO	City	Passengers	Change
1	Luis Muñoz Marín International Airport	SJU/TJSJ	San Juan	897,983	▼ -17.3%

==== 2012 ====
	Airport	IATA/ICAO	City	Passengers	Change
1	Luis Muñoz Marín International Airport	SJU/TJSJ	San Juan	1,085,514	—

==== 2009 ====
	Airport	IATA/ICAO	City	Passengers	Change
1	Luis Muñoz Marín International Airport	SJU/TJSJ	San Juan	1,165,457	▼ -21.2%

==== 2008 ====
	Airport	IATA/ICAO	City	Passengers	Change
1	Luis Muñoz Marín International Airport	SJU/TJSJ	San Juan	1,479,011	▼ -19.7%

==== 2007 ====
	Airport	IATA/ICAO	City	Passengers	Change
1	Luis Muñoz Marín International Airport	SJU/TJSJ	San Juan	1,842,525	▼ -6.5%

==== 2006 ====
	Airport	IATA/ICAO	City	Passengers	Change
1	Luis Muñoz Marín International Airport	SJU/TJSJ	San Juan	1,970,042	▲1.4%

==== 2005 ====
	Airport	IATA/ICAO	City	Passengers	Change
1	Luis Muñoz Marín International Airport	SJU/TJSJ	San Juan	1,943,139	▲1.7%

==== 2004 ====
	Airport	IATA/ICAO	City	Passengers	Change
1	Luis Muñoz Marín International Airport	SJU/TJSJ	San Juan	1,910,013	▲2.0%

==== 2003 ====
	Airport	IATA/ICAO	City	Passengers	Change
1	Luis Muñoz Marín International Airport	SJU/TJSJ	San Juan	1,872,040	▼ -5.2%

==== 2002 ====
	Airport	IATA/ICAO	City	Passengers	Change
1	Luis Muñoz Marín International Airport	SJU/TJSJ	San Juan	1,974,102	▼ -17.0%

==== 2001 ====
	Airport	IATA/ICAO	City	Passengers	Change
1	Luis Muñoz Marín International Airport	SJU/TJSJ	San Juan	2,377,045	▼ -0.3%

==== 2000 ====
	Airport	IATA/ICAO	City	Passengers	Change
1	Luis Muñoz Marín International Airport	SJU/TJSJ	San Juan	2,383,510	▲6.7%

==== 1999 ====
	Airport	IATA/ICAO	City	Passengers	Change
1	Luis Muñoz Marín International Airport	SJU/TJSJ	San Juan	2,234,020	—

== Cargo throughput ==
This list includes the weight of all yearly landed cargo in pounds per airport, counting freight and mail.

=== Summary ===
==== 2024–2000 ====
	Airport	IATA/ICAO	City	Weight of landed cargo in pounds (freight and mail)																								
	Airport	IATA/ICAO	City	2024	2023	2022	2021	2020	2019	2018	2017	2016	2015	2014	2013	2012	2011	2010	2009	2008	2007	2006	2005	2004	2003	2002	2001	2000
1	Luis Muñoz Marín International Airport	SJU/TJSJ	San Juan	1,776,938,952	1,751,263,616	1,700,308,624	1,666,915,382	1,479,233,218	1,225,582,692	1,253,233,704	1,208,323,492	1,084,961,328	1,008,603,300	850,270,758	847,031,376	849,842,262	867,078,992	882,936,872	1,086,774,488	862,034,200	1,044,179,900	1,211,392,900	1,249,975,700	903,839,700	1,303,478,900	1,073,496,600	834,861,000	969,801,720
2	Rafael Hernández International Airport	BQN/TJBQ	Aguadilla	360,703,946	365,413,640	377,703,400	427,603,730	359,767,920	530,189,810	488,086,330	523,499,150	532,393,460	713,335,570	660,524,330	716,596,030	822,224,300	666,221,700	514,800,900	509,888,900	643,473,100	621,002,600	594,486,200	572,613,000	548,988,500	626,221,500	290,991,470	312,415,786	683,238,730

=== Yearly ===
==== 2024 ====
	Airport	IATA/ICAO	City	Cargo (lb)	Change
1	Luis Muñoz Marín International Airport	SJU/TJSJ	San Juan	1,776,938,952	▲1.47%
2	Rafael Hernández International Airport	BQN/TJBQ	Aguadilla	360,703,946	▼ -1.29%

==== 2023 ====
	Airport	IATA/ICAO	City	Cargo (lb)	Change
1	Luis Muñoz Marín International Airport	SJU/TJSJ	San Juan	1,751,263,616	▲3.00%
2	Rafael Hernández International Airport	BQN/TJBQ	Aguadilla	365,413,640	▼ -3.25%

==== 2022 ====
	Airport	IATA/ICAO	City	Cargo (lb)	Change
1	Luis Muñoz Marín International Airport	SJU/TJSJ	San Juan	1,700,308,624	▲2.00%
2	Rafael Hernández International Airport	BQN/TJBQ	Aguadilla	377,703,400	▼ -11.67%

==== 2021 ====
	Airport	IATA/ICAO	City	Cargo (lb)	Change
1	Luis Muñoz Marín International Airport	SJU/TJSJ	San Juan	1,666,915,382	▲12.69%
2	Rafael Hernández International Airport	BQN/TJBQ	Aguadilla	427,603,730	▲18.86%

==== 2020 ====
	Airport	IATA/ICAO	City	Cargo (lb)	Change
1	Luis Muñoz Marín International Airport	SJU/TJSJ	San Juan	1,479,233,218	▲20.70%
2	Rafael Hernández International Airport	BQN/TJBQ	Aguadilla	359,767,920	▼ -32.14%

==== 2019 ====
	Airport	IATA/ICAO	City	Cargo (lb)	Change
1	Luis Muñoz Marín International Airport	SJU/TJSJ	San Juan	1,225,582,692	▼ -2.20%
2	Rafael Hernández International Airport	BQN/TJBQ	Aguadilla	530,189,810	▲1.47%

==== 2018 ====
	Airport	IATA/ICAO	City	Cargo (lb)	Change
1	Luis Muñoz Marín International Airport	SJU/TJSJ	San Juan	1,253,233,704	▲3.72%
2	Rafael Hernández International Airport	BQN/TJBQ	Aguadilla	488,086,330	▼ -6.76%

==== 2017 ====
	Airport	IATA/ICAO	City	Cargo (lb)	Change
1	Luis Muñoz Marín International Airport	SJU/TJSJ	San Juan	1,208,323,492	▲11.37%
2	Rafael Hernández International Airport	BQN/TJBQ	Aguadilla	523,499,150	▼ -1.67%

==== 2016 ====
	Airport	IATA/ICAO	City	Cargo (lb)	Change
1	Luis Muñoz Marín International Airport	SJU/TJSJ	San Juan	1,084,961,328	▲7.57%
2	Rafael Hernández International Airport	BQN/TJBQ	Aguadilla	532,393,460	▼ -25.37%

==== 2015 ====
	Airport	IATA/ICAO	City	Cargo (lb)	Change
1	Luis Muñoz Marín International Airport	SJU/TJSJ	San Juan	1,008,603,300	▲18.62%
2	Rafael Hernández International Airport	BQN/TJBQ	Aguadilla	713,335,570	▲8.00%

==== 2014 ====
	Airport	IATA/ICAO	City	Cargo (lb)	Change
1	Luis Muñoz Marín International Airport	SJU/TJSJ	San Juan	850,270,758	▲0.38%
2	Rafael Hernández International Airport	BQN/TJBQ	Aguadilla	660,524,330	▼ -7.82%

==== 2013 ====
	Airport	IATA/ICAO	City	Cargo (lb)	Change
1	Luis Muñoz Marín International Airport	SJU/TJSJ	San Juan	847,031,376	▼ -0.33%
2	Rafael Hernández International Airport	BQN/TJBQ	Aguadilla	716,596,030	▼ -12.85%

==== 2012 ====
	Airport	IATA/ICAO	City	Cargo (lb)	Change
1	Luis Muñoz Marín International Airport	SJU/TJSJ	San Juan	849,842,262	▼ -1.99%
2	Rafael Hernández International Airport	BQN/TJBQ	Aguadilla	822,224,300	▲23.42%

==== 2011 ====
	Airport	IATA/ICAO	City	Cargo (lb)	Change
1	Luis Muñoz Marín International Airport	SJU/TJSJ	San Juan	867,078,992	▼ -1.80%
2	Rafael Hernández International Airport	BQN/TJBQ	Aguadilla	666,221,700	▲29.41%

==== 2010 ====
	Airport	IATA/ICAO	City	Cargo (lb)	Change
1	Luis Muñoz Marín International Airport	SJU/TJSJ	San Juan	882,936,872	▼ -18.76%
2	Rafael Hernández International Airport	BQN/TJBQ	Aguadilla	514,800,900	▲0.96%

==== 2009 ====
	Airport	IATA/ICAO	City	Cargo (lb)	Change
1	Luis Muñoz Marín International Airport	SJU/TJSJ	San Juan	1,086,774,488	▲26.07%
2	Rafael Hernández International Airport	BQN/TJBQ	Aguadilla	509,888,900	▼ -20.76%

==== 2008 ====
	Airport	IATA/ICAO	City	Cargo (lb)	Change
1	Luis Muñoz Marín International Airport	SJU/TJSJ	San Juan	862,034,200	▼ -17.44%
2	Rafael Hernández International Airport	BQN/TJBQ	Aguadilla	643,473,100	▲3.62%

==== 2007 ====
	Airport	IATA/ICAO	City	Cargo (lb)	Change
1	Luis Muñoz Marín International Airport	SJU/TJSJ	San Juan	1,044,179,900	▼ -13.80%
2	Rafael Hernández International Airport	BQN/TJBQ	Aguadilla	621,002,600	▲4.46%

==== 2006 ====
	Airport	IATA/ICAO	City	Cargo (lb)	Change
1	Luis Muñoz Marín International Airport	SJU/TJSJ	San Juan	1,211,392,900	▼ -3.09%
2	Rafael Hernández International Airport	BQN/TJBQ	Aguadilla	594,486,200	▲3.82%

==== 2005 ====
	Airport	IATA/ICAO	City	Cargo (lb)	Change
1	Luis Muñoz Marín International Airport	SJU/TJSJ	San Juan	1,249,975,700	▲38.30%
2	Rafael Hernández International Airport	BQN/TJBQ	Aguadilla	572,613,000	▲4.30%

==== 2004 ====
	Airport	IATA/ICAO	City	Cargo (lb)	Change
1	Luis Muñoz Marín International Airport	SJU/TJSJ	San Juan	903,839,700	▼ -30.66%
2	Rafael Hernández International Airport	BQN/TJBQ	Aguadilla	548,988,500	▼ -12.33%

==== 2003 ====
	Airport	IATA/ICAO	City	Cargo (lb)	Change
1	Luis Muñoz Marín International Airport	SJU/TJSJ	San Juan	1,303,478,900	▲21.42%
2	Rafael Hernández International Airport	BQN/TJBQ	Aguadilla	626,221,500	▲115.20%

==== 2002 ====
	Airport	IATA/ICAO	City	Cargo (lb)	Change
1	Luis Muñoz Marín International Airport	SJU/TJSJ	San Juan	1,073,496,600	▲28.58%
2	Rafael Hernández International Airport	BQN/TJBQ	Aguadilla	290,991,470	▼ -6.86%

==== 2001 ====
	Airport	IATA/ICAO	City	Cargo (lb)	Change
1	Luis Muñoz Marín International Airport	SJU/TJSJ	San Juan	834,861,000	▼ -13.91%
2	Rafael Hernández International Airport	BQN/TJBQ	Aguadilla	312,415,786	▼ -54.27%

==== 2000 ====
	Airport	IATA/ICAO	City	Cargo (lb)	Change
1	Luis Muñoz Marín International Airport	SJU/TJSJ	San Juan	969,801,720	—
2	Rafael Hernández International Airport	BQN/TJBQ	Aguadilla	683,238,730	—

== See also ==
- Puerto Rico Ports Authority
- Transportation in Puerto Rico
- List of the busiest airports in the Caribbean
- List of the busiest airports in Central America
- List of busiest airports in Africa
- List of the busiest airports in Europe
- List of the busiest airports in Latin America
- List of the busiest airports in North America
- List of the busiest airports in South America
- List of the busiest airports in the United States
