= Bagicz =

- Settlement
- Location within Poland
- Coordinates: 54°12′1″N 15°42′0″E
- Country: Poland
- Voivodeship: West Pomeranian
- County: Kołobrzeg
- Gmina: Ustronie Morskie
- Population: 38

Bagicz [ˈbaɡit͡ʂ] (German Bodenhagen) is a settlement in the administrative district of Gmina Ustronie Morskie, within Kołobrzeg County, West Pomeranian Voivodeship, in north-western Poland. It lies approximately 4 km (2 mi) south-west of Ustronie Morskie, 10 km (6 mi) north-east of Kołobrzeg, and 114 km (71 mi) north-east of the regional capital Szczecin.

The settlement has a population of 38.

Bagicz is known to be a site of significance for the Wielbark culture, a Roman Iron Age civilization around the 1st century, with multiple graves found in the region contributing to the study, including the Princess of Bagicz.

Bagicz has an active airfield, Kołobrzeg-Bagicz Airfield, which has been converted from a Cold War era Soviet airbase, where the ill-fated MiG-23 involved in the 1989 Belgium MiG-23 crash departed from.

For the history of the region, see History of Pomerania.
