= Princess of Bagicz =

Wielbark Culture remains of a Woman from Bagicz (120 AD)

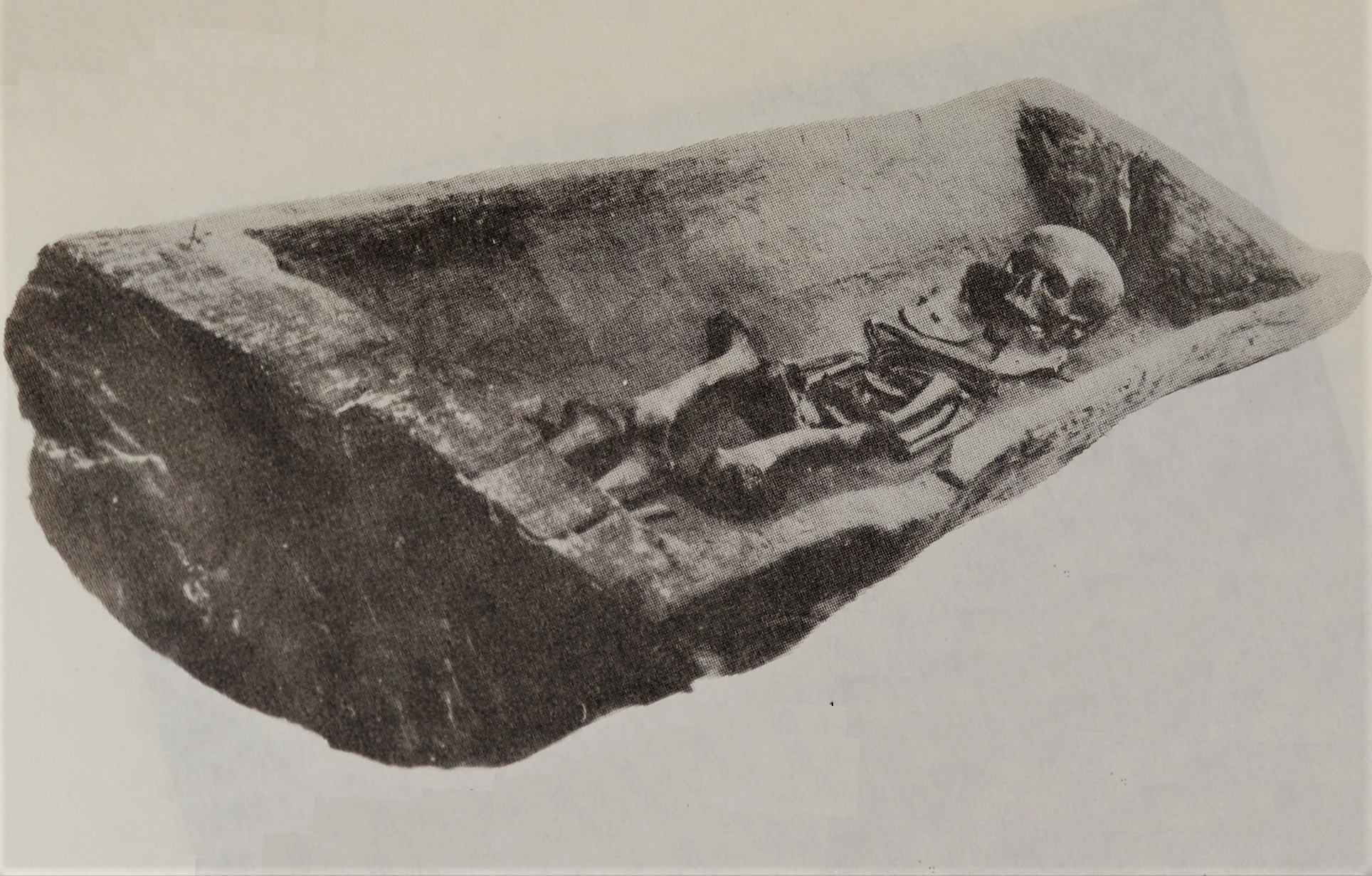
- Material: Human skeleton, treetrunk coffin made of oak, assorted jewelry
- Size: 145-147 cm
- Created: 120 AD
- Discovered: 1899; Bagicz, Kołobrzeg County, West Pomeranian Voivodeship, Poland
- Present location: National Museum in Szczecin
- Culture: Wielbark Culture

The Princess of Bagicz is the name given to the human skeleton of a young female from the Roman Iron Age discovered in 1899 due to cliff erosion in the village of Bagicz, West Pomeranian Voivodeship, Poland (previously called Bodenhagen bei Kolberg). Dating to the mid-2nd century, the skeleton is considered an important find for the study of the Wielbark culture, and though not all of material survived upon discovery, the tomb finds are currently maintained at the National Museum in Szczecin.

== Discovery ==
In 1899, the remains of the Princess of Bagicz fell from a seaside cliff near the village of Bagicz, with followed with additional excavations conducted by archaeologist Adolf Stubenrauch. The woman was found deposited in a log coffin, with a brooch, two bronze bracelets, a necklace, and a bone pin. Inside the coffin, additional organic artifacts included a wooden stool, bovine pelt, woolen clothes, which were well preserved due to its humidified surroundings. The remains of the woman were incomplete during the excavation. Though referenced a few times in German academia, the findings were famous in Polish archaeology due to its well-preserved nature.

Though documented in a museum, the organic artifacts unfortunately did not survive decomposition on top of World War II, and the items that did survive did so with more modern facilities once the National Museum in Szczecin was established. The woman and the coffin were on display in the National Museum in 1980–2011, with an additional special exhibit display in 2018 at the Museum of Polish Arms, Kołobrzeg.

== Description and dating ==
The Princess of Bagicz is a petite female who is approximately 25-35 years old, with an estimated height of 145-147 cm. Her skull, small fragments of her right rib, parts of her scapula, part of her arms (missing the left humerus), and both of her legs are extant. The grave was not known to be tied to any cemetery, and the grave goods gave speculation that she was a "princess", though the knowledge of Wielbark culture hierarchy is limited. With the cliffside of Bagicz eroding at a rate of 70 cm annually, a few more graves were discovered in the area in 2018 due to a warm spring, hot summer, and intense autumn storms, with only one set of remains successfully excavated. With the progression of the rate of erosion, it is believed that the Princess of Bagicz was buried 120 meters from the shoreline. She was cremated upon death.

Her speculated social social status was also based upon additional Wielbark remains, which were discovered during the construction of Kołobrzeg-Bagicz Airfield in 1935, which had four graves, and also dated to the same time period.

Multiple dating analysis was utilized on the tomb findings. In the 1980s, the typologicla analysis indicated that the burial took place in the mid-2nd century, narrowed to 110-160 AD. Radiocarbon dating, placed an earlier date of 113 BC - 65 AD with 93.8% certainty; which was extracted from the third molar, one of two surviving teeth found from the skull. Factoring a seaside diet, and proximity to aquatic ecosystems, the presence of Carbon-14 is seen to be more diminished around the region, leading to an older reading.

The composition of her diet was heavy in fish, though not from the Baltic Sea, but rather more freshwater in nature from lakes and inland rivers based upon the isotopes and proteins found on the surviving teeth.

Osteological analysis indicated that the Princess had osteoarthritis of the lower spine, possibly from a lot of physical work.

On 31 July 2024, a core from the coffin was drilled as part of the dendrochronological study. The wood used for the coffin is oak, with 112 annual growth rings counted. Based upon similar samples from the Roman Iron Age in Greater Poland, the coffin is consistent with samples from 3 BC to 108 AD, the estimated felling narrowed down to 120 AD, with the assumption that the tree was immediately worked on for the funeral. The study falls in line with the consistency of the 1980s typological study.

It is believed that further erosion from the cliffs of Bagicz will unveil further graves and remains that can provide further insight into the Princess of Bagicz and Wielbark culture.
