= 32nd Air Operations Squadron =

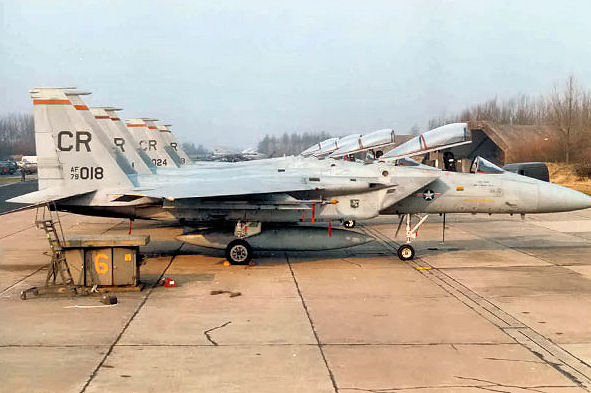
- F-15 Eagles on the flight line at Soesterberg Air Base, about 1985
- Active: 1 Feb 1940 – 15 Oct 1946; 8 Sep 1955 – 1 July 1994; 1 Aug 1994 – 1 Nov 2005
- Country: United States
- Branch: United States Air Force
- Nickname(s): Wolfhounds
- Engagements: World War II; Gulf War
- Decorations: Presidential Unit Citation; Air Force Outstanding Unit Award

Insignia
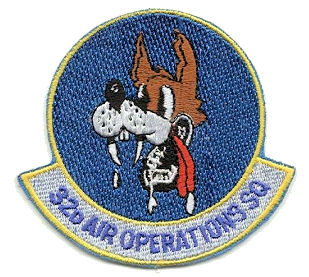
- Patch with 32nd Air Operations Squadron emblem (approved 2 August 1945) (Note: Heraldry: On a light turquoise blue disc, border light yellow orange, edged black, a caricatured, brown and white wolf's head, with mouth open and fangs bared, dripping saliva, proper, white facing to the dexter.)

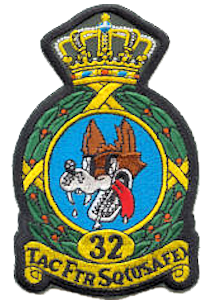
- Patch with 32nd Tactical Fighter Squadron emblem (Note: During the time the squadron was stationed in the Netherlands, it adopted the wreath used by squadrons of the Royal Netherlands Air Force as part of its emblem.)

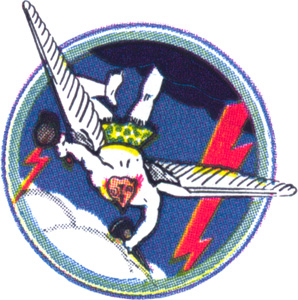
- Early WWII 32nd Fighter Squadron emblem
- Squadron code: CR (1970 – April 1994)

The 32nd Air Operations Squadron, nicknamed the Wolfhounds, is an inactive United States Air Force unit. Its last assignment was with 32nd Air Operations Group, based at Ramstein Air Base, Germany. It was inactivated on 1 November 2005. Between 1955 and 1994, the unit was based at Soesterberg Air Base in the Netherlands, providing air defence on behalf of NATO as a fighter squadron.

== History ==
=== World War II ===
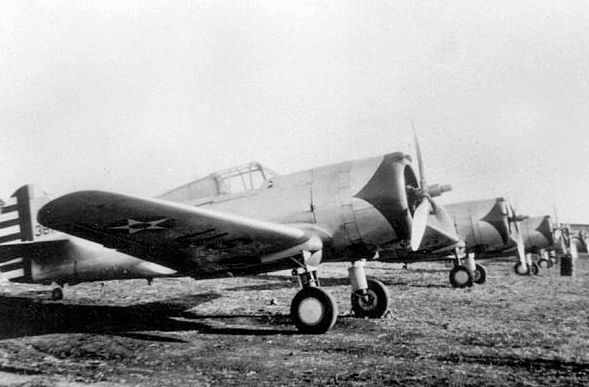
32nd Pursuit Squadron P-36 Hawks at Ponce Field, Puerto Rico, 1941

The US Army Air Corps constituted the 32nd Pursuit Squadron (Interceptor). Seven weeks later, on 1 February 1940, the squadron activated at Kelly Field, Texas. After completing this training, in November 1940, the 32nd transferred to Langley Field in Virginia to join the 36th Pursuit Group. Once there, the 36th equipped the squadron with Curtiss P-36A Hawk aircraft. During its stay at Langley, the 32nd Pursuit Squadron flew a number of Curtiss YP-37 aircraft for a short period.

==== Panama Canal defense ====
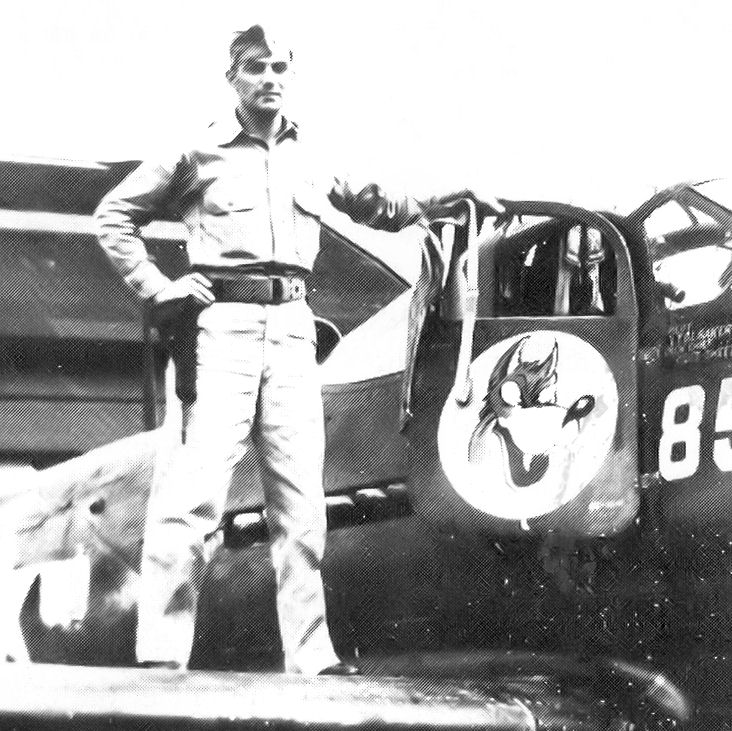
32nd Fighter Squadron P-39 with squadron emblem, Hato Field, Curaçao, March 1944

On 6 January 1941, the squadron moved to Losey Field, on the island of Puerto Rico as a reaction to the German presence in South America. By June the Squadron had a mix of Curtiss P-40 Warhawks and Bell P-39 Airacobras at Ponce Field, although several Curtiss P-36As had been briefly assigned earlier during its first days on Puerto Rico. This strength remained essentially unchanged up to 7 December 1941.

After the Pearl Harbor Attack, the Squadron dispatched a detachment to Arecibo Field, Puerto Rico. In early 1942, the German Navy began anti-shipping operations using U-boats in the Caribbean. The subs sank several tankers in the harbor at San Nicholas, Aruba and even shelled an oil refinery on the island. The Squadron standardized on the P-39, and established detachments at Arecibo Field. The Squadron moved entirely to Arecibo by 19 February. Another detachment was established at Hato Field, Curaçao. The mission was to provide air defense for the bomber and anti-submarine units that had been assembled there. The Puerto Rico-based elements of the Squadron went through a training program, which included maneuvers with Puerto Rican Infantry and Artillery units. Redesignated as the 32nd Fighter Squadron on 15 May 1942, by the end of June the main body was still at Arecibo, although the detachments at St. Thomas and Hato Field continued.

The 32nd Fighter Squadron had the responsibility for tracking down German U-boat Wolfpacks. The Wolfpacks, three or more subs together in a mission known as search and destroy, this led to the famous name and insignia "Wolfhounds". In the fall of 1942, the Germans reduced their submarine activity in the Caribbean region to concentrate its activity on the North Atlantic convoy route and the approaches to northwest Africa. With the withdrawal of submarines from the Caribbean region the Antilles Air Task Force, which included the 32nd, concentrated its efforts as a striking force on its primary function of guarding against possible attacks on the Panama Canal.

With the departure of its parent 36th Fighter Group to the United States in June 1943, the 32nd remained in the Caribbean. On 3 August 1943, the squadron was transferred to the Antilles Air Command. The Squadron was further assigned to the Trinidad Detachment and VI Fighter Command, Antilles Air Command. However, despite the assignment to Antilles Air Command, a detachment of the Squadron was noted at Howard Field in the Panama Canal Zone detached to XXVI Fighter Command. Effective 13 March 1944, the entire Squadron moved to France Field in the Panama Canal Zone to replace the 52d Fighter Squadron. The squadron was placed under XXVI Fighter Command, whose task was to defend the Panama Canal and to perform reconnaissance missions.

The unit moved from France Field to Howard Field between 7 and 10 January 1945, where it was to replace the 43d Fighter Squadron and prepare for the transition to Lockheed P-38 Lightnings. On 1 February 1945, the unit was redesignated as the 32nd Fighter Squadron, Twin Engine. However, no sooner had conversion to the P-38's been completed than the entire complement of P-38s was hangared and the unit activities ran down with the end of the war in Europe. The squadron ceased all flying activities in June, and the P-38s were stored in a hangar. By October 1945, the squadron was reduced to a non-operational administrative organization. Inactivated on 15 October 1946.

=== Air defense in the Netherlands (1955–1994) ===
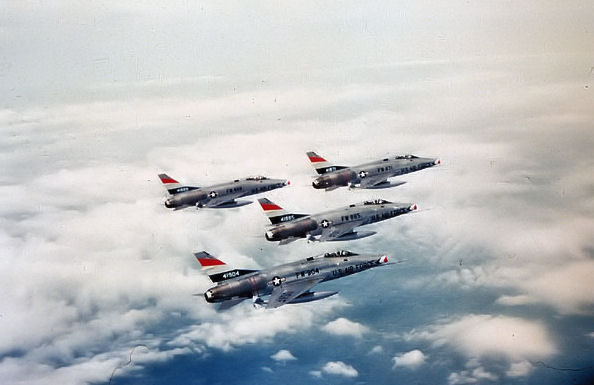
32nd TFS North American F-100C Super Sabres in flight, 1959

In 1954, the Netherlands government agreed, at the instigation of NATO, to accept the offer of the American government to deploy a squadron of American military planes. The task of the squadron would be to provide a contribution to Dutch air defense, within the context of NATO. The 512th Fighter Day Squadron, stationed at RAF Manston in Great Britain, was detailed by the Headquarters of the USAFE for transference to the Netherlands. Its new home base would be Soesterberg Air Base. The first group of American airmen, compromised quartermasters and air traffic controllers, arrived at Soesterberg on 6 October 1954.

In September 1955, the 512th moved to RAF Bentwaters, England without personnel or equipment. Its 28 North American F-86F Sabres, personnel and equipment however stayed in the Netherlands and were assigned to the newly activated 32nd Fighter-Day Squadron (32nd FDS). The squadron designation was chosen by the USAF in light of the World War II ties by the squadron to the defense of Dutch possessions in the Caribbean, giving the unit a historical link to the Netherlands. The 32nd was assigned to the 36th Fighter-Day Wing at Bitburg Air Base in West Germany, its historical parent unit at the time of its activation. On 15 August 1956, the 32nd FDS began to receive the North American F-100C Super Sabre.

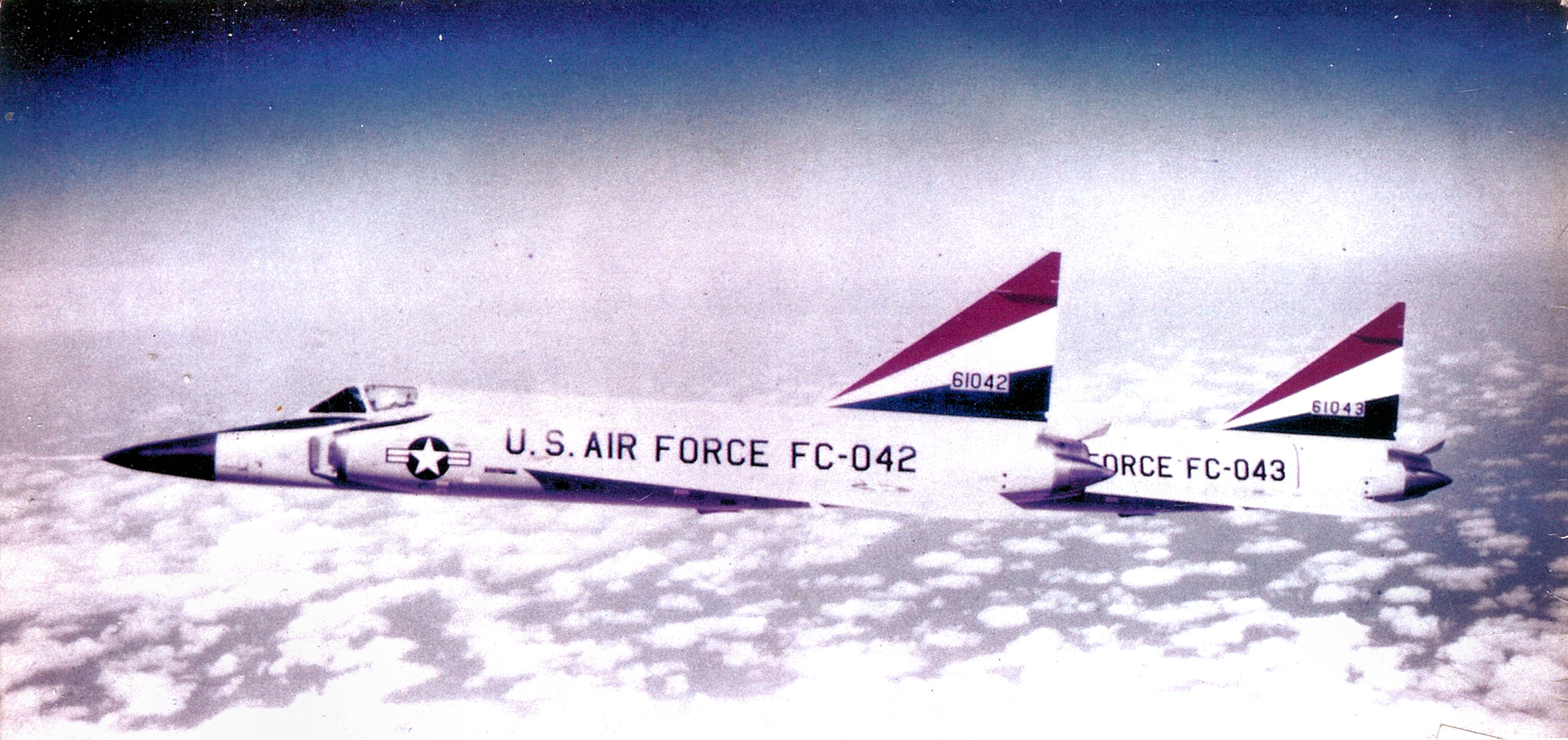
Convair F-102A Delta Daggers of the 32nd FIS in formation, circa 1960s

On 18 July 1958, the USAFE redesignated the unit as the 32nd Tactical Fighter Squadron (32nd TFS), as part of the 36th Tactical Fighter Wing as a result of an Air Force–wide redesignation of tactical air units. In 1959, the 32nd received the signature "Royal", the crown and wreath of the Dutch royal family (the House of Orange) were added to the emblem, giving it its unique look. This unique honor was granted in recognition of the unit's contribution to the defense of The Netherlands and graphically illustrates the 32nd's close ties with the Royal Netherlands Air Force. This designation was brief, however, and the squadron became the 32nd Fighter-Interceptor Squadron (32nd FIS) a year later.

On 17 December 1960, the Wolfhounds received their first eight Convair F-102A Delta Daggers.

On 1 November 1968, the USAF transferred the 32nd Fighter Interceptor Squadron to the command of Seventeenth Air Force stationed at Sembach Air Base, Germany.

==== Tactical fighter operations (1969–1989) ====
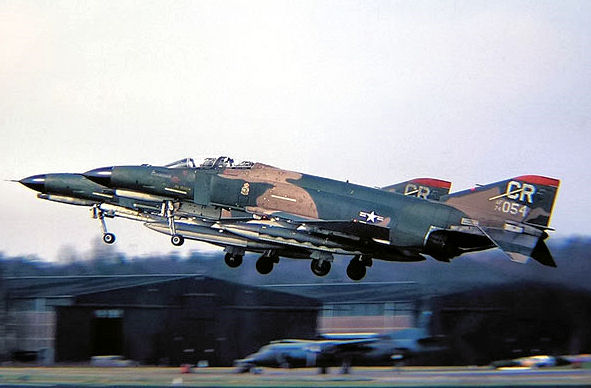
McDonnell Douglas F-4E Phantom IIs of the 32nd TFS taking off from Soesterberg Air Base, 1976

On 1 July 1969, the USAF redesignated the unit as the 32nd Tactical Fighter Squadron (32nd TFS) and reequipped the squadron with the McDonnell Douglas F-4E Phantom II, with the first two (68-0401 and 68-0405) arriving on 6 August 1969. On 14 November 1969, the 32nd TFS lost their first Phantom when F-4E 68-0422 crashed on approach to Aviano Air Base, Italy, after running out of fuel – both crew ejected safely.

On 21 June 1971, F-4E 68-0433 crashed near Maurik, the Netherlands, killing both the crew after the pilot over corrected when trying to avoid a flock of birds.

In March 1976, the Wolfhounds began receiving newer FY1974 F-4Es to replace their older models.

On 22 August 1977, F-4E Phantom II 74-1051 crashed into the North Sea near Terschelling after suffering an engine flame out, killing both crew members. On 19 October 1977, the USAF decided that the 32nd would receive the McDonnell Douglas F-15 Eagle as part of Project Ready Eagle.

Throughout 1978, the majority of Phantoms were flown to Ramstein Air Base in West Germany where they were assigned to the 86th Tactical Fighter Wing, while others went to Spangdahlem Air Base and Hahn Air Base. While the Wolfhounds underwent conversion from the Phantom, the 71st Tactical Fighter Squadron and 94th Tactical Fighter Squadron deployed to Soesterberg from 13 September to 20 December 1978 as part of Coronet Sandpiper to fulfil NATO's air defence commitment. The first two F-15As (77-0074 and 77-0075) for the 32nd TFS arrived at Soesterberg on 13 September 1978, with the last jets arriving on 17 January 1979. The 32nd TFS began receiving the more advanced F-15C in June 1980.

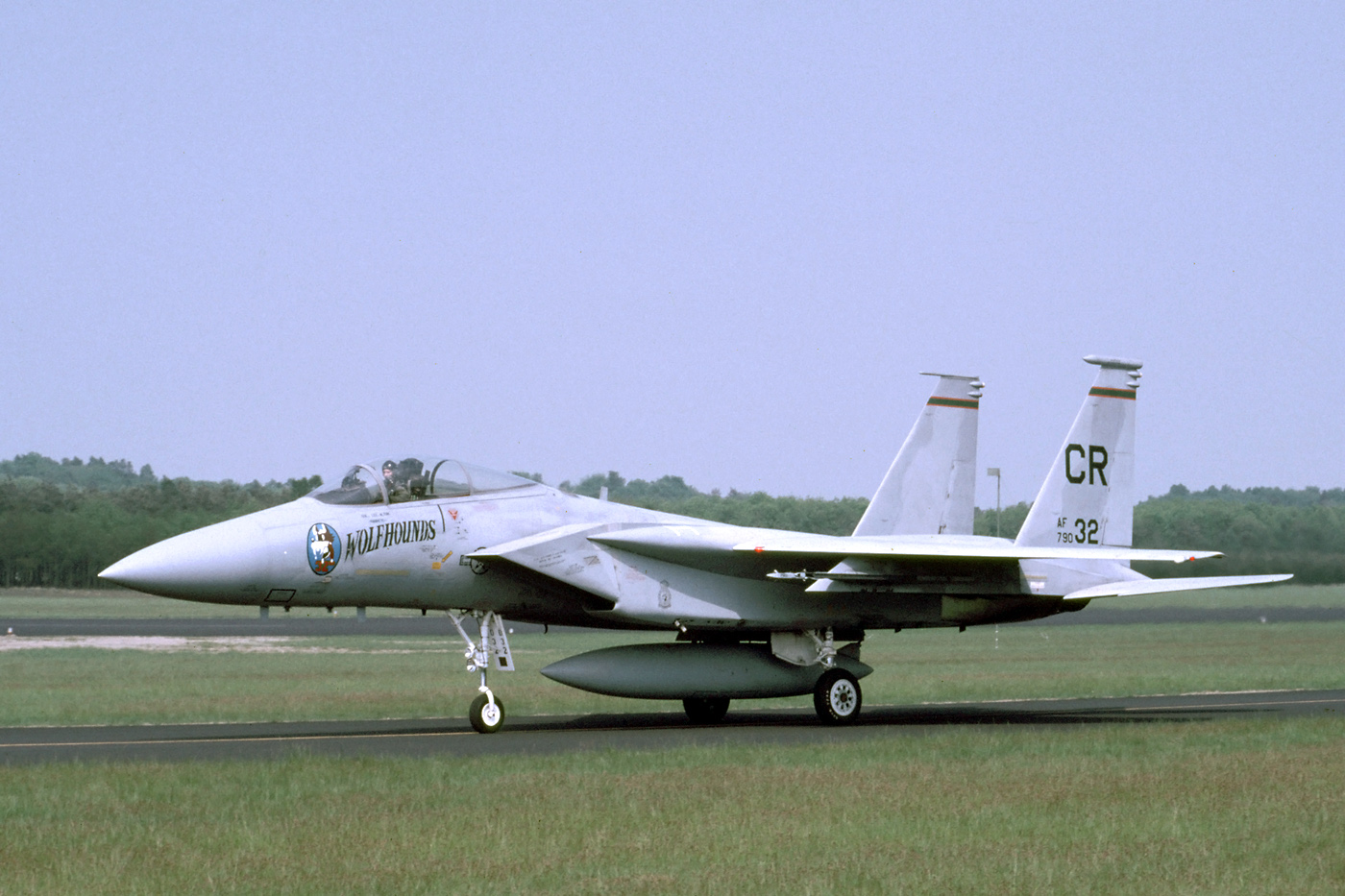
McDonnell Douglas F-15C Eagle 79-0032 of the 32nd TFS taxiing at Soesterberg, May 1986

Between 7 and 23 June 1982, the Wolfhounds hosted the 71st TFS who had deployed to Soesterberg as part of Coronet Sidewinder II. The 32nd TFS hosted the 71st TFS once more between 1 and 29 June 1984 as part of Coronet Hawk. The 9th Tactical Fighter Squadron deployed to Soesterberg between 20 May and 20 June 1986 under Coronet Apache.

On 4 July 1989, a pair of 32nd TFS F-15Cs scrambled to intercept what turned out to be an unoccupied Soviet Air Forces MiG-23M 'Flogger' which had flown on autopilot from its base in Bagicz, Poland, to West Germany after the pilot had ejected. The pilots were instructed to shoot it down over the North Sea however the MiG-23 ran out of fuel and crashed into a house in Kortrijk, Belgium, killing an occupant.

In 1989, the Dutch government allowed USAF to expand its headquarters unit at Soesterberg from squadron to group. The 32nd Tactical Fighter Group was activated at Soesterberg on 16 November 1989 and took over functions of old 32nd Squadron headquarters element and support flights (later squadrons) received support responsibilities.

On 25 April 1990, F-15C 81-0049 crashed into the North Sea after its engines caught fire – the pilot ejected safely. The 32nd TFS hosted the 60th Tactical Fighter Squadron between 31 May and 25 June 1990 as part of Coronet Trigger.

==== Gulf War to inactivation (1990–1994) ====
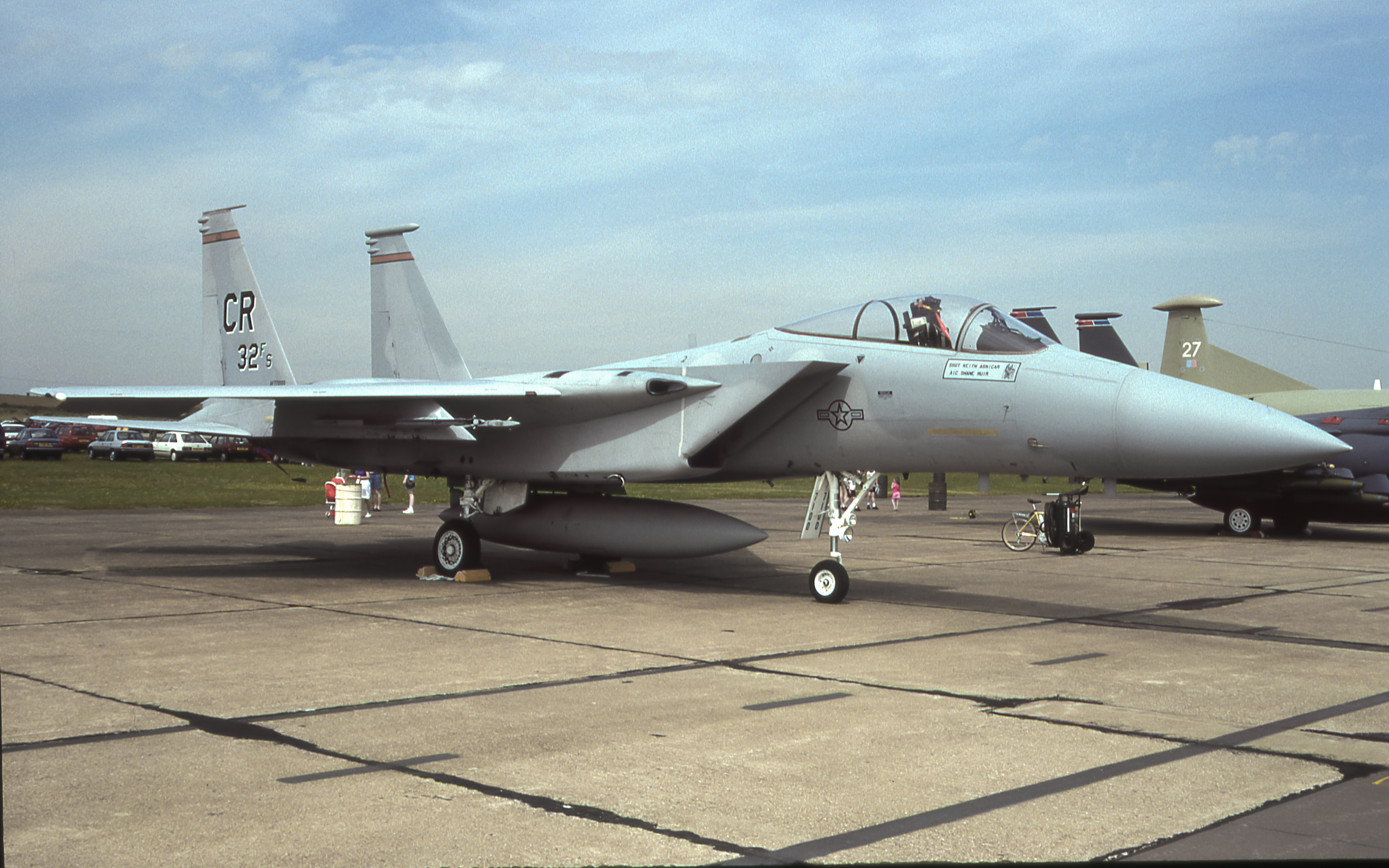
McDonnell Douglas F-15A Eagle 77-0100 of the 32nd FS at RAF Lakenheath, August 1992

During the 1991 Gulf War, after more than forty years, the Wolfhounds saw action again. Aircrew and ground support personnel were deployed, during the Operations DESERT SHIELD and DESERT STORM, August 1990 until March 1991, at Incirlik Air Base, Turkey. On 28 January 1991, Capt. "Muddy" Watrous shot down an Iraqi Air Force MiG-23 'Flogger', the Wolfhounds' only victory of the war.

After the war, they continued their air activities in theatre as a part of Operation Provide Comfort from April 1991 until April 1993. Headquarters USAFE replaced the 32nd Fighter Group on 1 July with the 632nd Air Base Squadron; its duty was to complete the closure actions.

In late 1991 and throughout 1992, the Wolfhounds began re-equipping with the F-15A/B. On 1 November 1991, the unit was redesignated the 32nd Fighter Squadron (32nd FS). Between 9 June and 1 July 1992, the 60th Fighter Squadron deployed to Soesterberg as part of Coronet Volunteer.

On 19 April 1994, the group furled its colors in formal ceremonies attended by members of the royal family and the American ambassador. The 32nd Group's subordinate units were inactivated on 1 July and the group on 1 October 1994.

=== Air operations unit (1994–2005) ===
In the spring of 1994, USAFE received permission from HQ USAF to use the 32nd designation for the new 32nd Air Operations Group. The 32nd Fighter Squadron was redesigned the 32nd Air Operations Squadron on 1 August 1994 following their inactivation at Soesterberg Air Base in July. The squadron assigned to the 32nd Air Operations Group, formerly the 32nd Fighter Group, which was also redesigned on 1 August 1994. Both the group and the squadron were stationed at Ramstein Air Base, Germany, under the USAFE Theater Air and Space-operations Center. The 32nd Air Operations Squadron was inactivated on 1 November 2005.

== Lineage ==
- Constituted as the 32nd Pursuit Squadron (Interceptor) on 22 December 1939

Activated on 1 February 1940
Redesignated 32nd Fighter Squadron (Single Engine) on 15 May 1942
Redesignated 32nd Fighter Squadron (Single Engine) on 1 February 1944
Inactivated on 15 October 1946

- Redesignated 32nd Fighter-Day Squadron on 9 May 1955

Activated on 8 September 1955
Redesignated: 32nd Tactical Fighter Squadron on 8 July 1958
Redesignated: 32nd Fighter-Interceptor Squadron on 8 July 1959
Redesignated: 32nd Tactical Fighter Squadron on 1 July 1969
Redesignated: 32nd Fighter Squadron on 1 November 1991
Inactivated 1 July 1994

- Redesignated 32nd Air Operations Squadron 1 August 1994 and activated

Inactivated 1 November 2005

=== Assignments ===
- 36th Pursuit Group (later 36th Fighter Group), 1 February 1940
- Antilles Air Command, 3 August 1943
- XXVI Fighter Command, 13 March 1944
- 6th Fighter Wing, 25 August-15 October 1946
- 36th Fighter-Day Group, 8 September 1955 (attached to 36th Fighter-Day Wing after October 1956)
- 36th Fighter-Day Wing (later 36th Tactical Fighter Wing), 8 December 1957
- 86th Fighter-Interceptor Wing (later 86th Air Division), 8 April 1960
- Seventeenth Air Force, 1 November 1968
- 32nd Tactical Fighter Group, 16 November 1989 – 1 July 1994
- 32nd Air Operations Group, 1 August 1994 – 1 November 2005

=== Stations ===
- Kelly Field, Texas, 1 February 1940
- Brooks Field, Texas, 1 February 1940
- Langley Field, Virginia, 18 November 1940
- Losey Field, Puerto Rico, 6 January 1941

Detachment operated from Arecibo Field, Puerto Rico, 11 December 1941 – 19 February 1942

- Arecibo Field, Puerto Rico, 19 February 1942
- Hato Field, Curaçao, Netherlands West Indies, 9 March 1943

Detachment operated from: Dakota Field, Aruba, Netherlands West Indies, 9 March 1943 – March 1944
Detachment operated from: Losey Field, Puerto Rico, 9 March – 4 June 1943

- France Field, Panama Canal Zone, 13 March 1944
- Howard Field, Panama Canal Zone, 10 January 1945 – 15 October 1946
- Soesterberg Air Base, Netherlands, 8 September 1955 – 1 July 1994
- Ramstein Air Base, Germany, 1 July 1994 – 1 November 2005

=== Aircraft ===
Aircraft operated include:

- Curtiss YP-37 Hawk (1940)
- Curtiss P-36 Hawk (1940–1943)
- Curtiss P-40 Warhawk (1942–1944)
- Bell P-39 Airacobra (1942–1945)
- Lockheed P-38 Lightning (1945–1946)
- Republic P-47 Thunderbolt (1946)
- North American F-86F Sabre (1955–1956)
- North American F-100C Super Sabre (1956–1960)
- Lockheed T-33A Shooting Star (1959–1967)
- Convair TF/F-102A Delta Dagger (1960–1969)
- McDonnell Douglas F-4E Phantom II (1969–1978)
- McDonnell Douglas F-15A/B Eagle (1978–1980; 1991–1994)
- McDonnell Douglas F-15C/D Eagle (1980–1992)

== Bibliography ==
- Hagdedorn, Dan (1995). Alae Supra Canalem: Wings Over the Canal. Nashville, TN: Turner Publishing. ISBN 1-56311-153-5.
- Maurer, Maurer, ed. (1983) [1961]. Air Force Combat Units of World War II (PDF) (reprint ed.). Washington, DC: Office of Air Force History. ISBN 0-912799-02-1. LCCN 61060979. Archived from the original (PDF) on 15 January 2021.
- Maurer, Maurer, ed. (1982) [1969]. Combat Squadrons of the Air Force, World War II (PDF) (reprint ed.). Washington, DC: Office of Air Force History. ISBN 0-405-12194-6. LCCN 70605402. OCLC 72556. Archived from the original (PDF) on 20 August 2023.
- Ravenstein, Charles A. (1984). Air Force Combat Wings, Lineage & Honors Histories 1947-1977. Washington, DC: Office of Air Force History. ISBN 0-912799-12-9.
