= Bellegem =

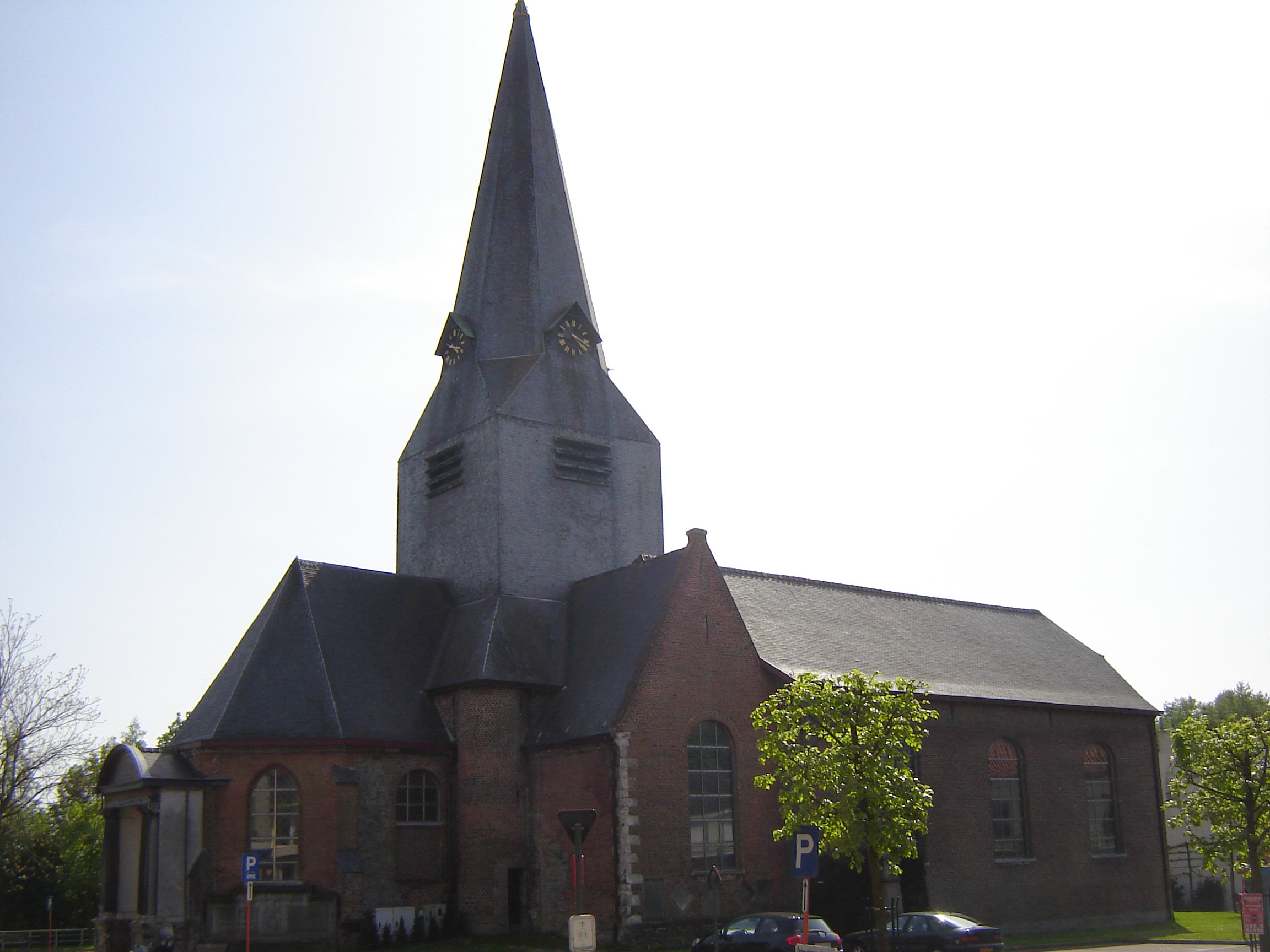

- Location in Belgium
- Coordinates: 50°46′N 3°16′E
- Country: Belgium
- Province: West Flanders
- Municipality: Kortrijk

Area
  - Total: 13.98 km^{2} (5.40 sq mi)

Population (2024)
  - Total: 3,860
- Time zone: UTC+1 (CET)
  - Summer (DST): UTC+2 (CEST)
- 8510: 8510
- Area code: 056
- Website: www.kortrijk.be

Bellegem is a part of the Belgian city Kortrijk situated in West Flanders, Belgium. Bellegem was an independent municipality until the municipal reorganization of 1977. In 2024, it had an estimated population of 3,860.

== History ==
The higher parts of the area were already inhabited during the Neolithic period, as evidenced by finds such as end scrapers, mining blades, and axes. In the middle of the 1st century, Roman influences were introduced, as evidenced by the remains of Roman villas.

In 1111, Bellegem was first mentioned in writing, referencing a certain Morantus de Bellgim. In addition to numerous smaller lordships, there was the village lordship known as Ter Kercke. From 1624 until the French period, this was in the possession of the Petitpas family. There must have been an independent parish before 1195, as there was also a Romanesque church building.

The 16th century brought famine, a plague epidemic (1555-1556), and then religious strife, in which the Calvinists were replaced by gangs of malcontents. The Nine Years' War (1688-1697) followed, during which French troops regularly plundered the village. From February 27 to March 7, 1814, Bellegem was the focus of a battle between Prussian and French troops.

In 1827, the congregation Sisters of Mary, also called Sisters of Saint Joseph, was founded in Bellegem. The monastery was closed in 1967.

From 1865 onwards, industrialization began with the establishment of the chicory factory Delberghe. In 1874 and 1892, breweries were established, and in 1928, the NV Zijdemaatschappij of Victor Cambien and Jozef Van de Maele was founded. In 1927, Maurice Dierick started a furniture factory that grew significantly.

== History of Bockor Brewery (Brouwerij Omer Vander Ghinste) ==
Bockor Brewery, now known as Brouwerij Omer Vander Ghinste, was founded in 1892 by Remi Vander Ghinste for his son Omer Vander Ghinste. Initially, the brewery produced a brown ale typical of the West Flanders region. Over the years, it expanded its offerings and became known for its Bockor Pils and Omer beers. The brewery is currently in its fourth generation of family ownership and continues to produce a variety of traditional and spontaneously fermented beers.

== Trivia ==
- On July 4, 1989, an unmanned Soviet-Russian MiG-23 fighter jet crashed into a house in the Bellegem plane crash, killing a young resident.
- According to the 2008 census, there were 170 people living in Belgium who bore the surname Van Bellegem. Most of them lived in Ghent and the surrounding area. Another 1098 bore the name Van Belleghem.
- Amandus of Maastricht is the patron saint of Bellegem.
