= 1989 Belgium MiG-23 crash =

Aviation accident

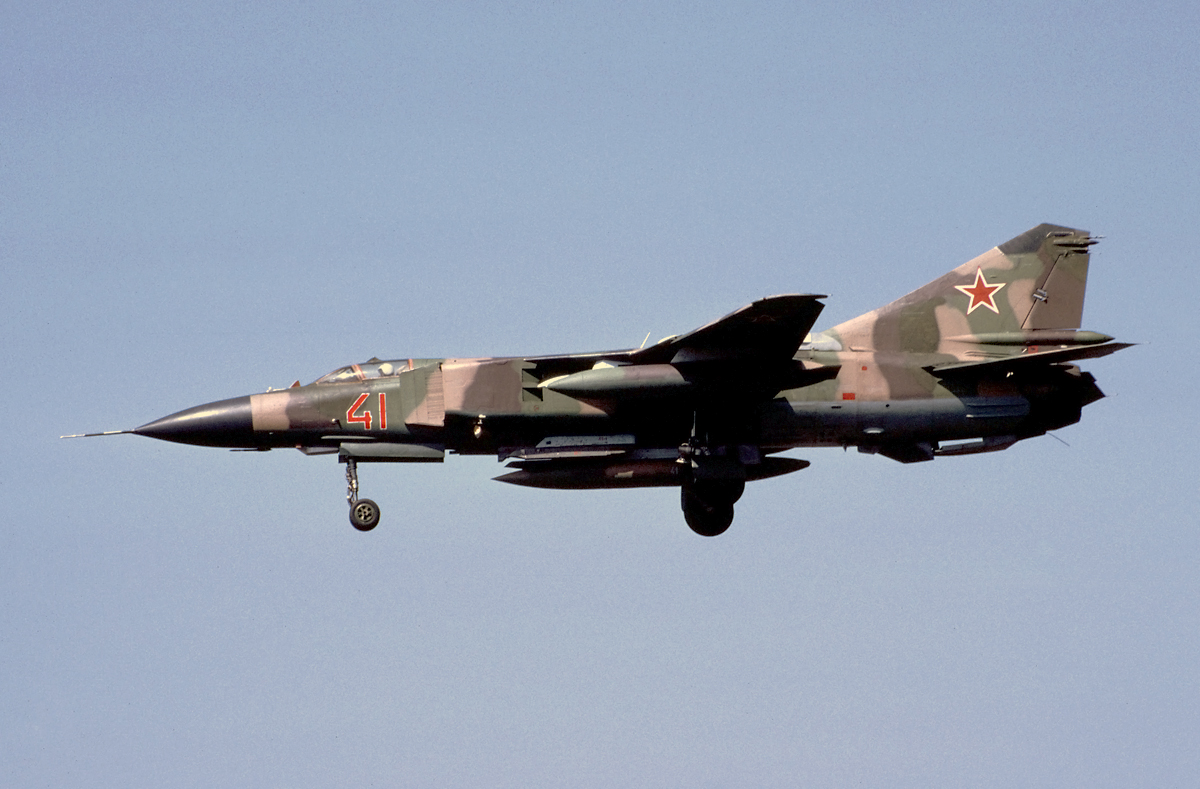
- A Soviet MiG-23 similar to the one involved in the accident

Accident
- Date: 4 July 1989
- Summary: Crashed into a house following pilot ejection and fuel exhaustion
- Site: Bellegem, Kortrijk, Belgium; 50°45′33.8″N 3°18′41.4″E
- Total fatalities: 1
- Total survivors: 1

Aircraft
- Aircraft type: Mikoyan-Gurevich MiG-23M
- Operator: Soviet Air Forces
- Flight origin: Bagicz airbase, Kołobrzeg, Poland
- Occupants: 1
- Crew: 1
- Fatalities: 0
- Survivors: 1

Ground casualties
- Ground fatalities: 1

On 4 July 1989, a pilotless MiG-23 jet fighter of the Soviet Air Forces crashed into a house in Bellegem, near Kortrijk, Belgium, killing one person. The pilot had ejected over an hour earlier near Kołobrzeg, Poland, after experiencing technical problems, but the aircraft continued flying for around 900 km (600 mi) before running out of fuel and crashing into the ground.

== History of the flight ==
The incident started as a routine training flight. Colonel Nikolai Skuridin, the pilot, was to fly a MiG-23M Flogger-B from the Bagicz Airbase near Kołobrzeg, Poland. During takeoff, the engine's afterburner failed, causing a partial loss of power. At an altitude of 150 m (500 ft) and descending, Skuridin elected to abandon the aircraft and ejected safely. However, the engine kept running and the aircraft remained airborne, flying on autopilot in a westerly direction.

The unmanned aircraft left Polish airspace, crossing into East Germany and then West Germany, where it was intercepted by a pair of F-15s from the 32nd Tactical Fighter Squadron of the United States Air Forces Europe, stationed at Soesterberg Air Base in the Netherlands. The F-15 pilots reported that the MiG had no crew. At that stage the aircraft was potentially heading towards the United Kingdom's airspace, so a live armed Quick Reaction Alert (QRA) Phantom FGR2 of 56(F) Squadron was scrambled from RAF Wattisham in Suffolk and instructed to fly at maximum subsonic speed to the Kent coast and be prepared to shoot the MiG down if it crossed the English Channel.

The MiG-23 crossed into Dutch airspace and continued into Belgium. The escorting F-15s were instructed to shoot down the plane, but as the MiG ran out of fuel, it started a slow turn to the south, prompting the French Air Force to put its fighters on alert. After flying over 900 km (560 mi), the MiG eventually crashed into the house at 273 Doornikserijksweg, in the town of Bellegem, near Kortrijk, some 5–10 km (3–6 mi) from the French border, killing a local resident.

== Victim ==
The only victim of the accident was Wim Delaere, a computer science student reported to have been either 18 or 19 years old. He was sleeping alone after celebrating the end of his university exams the previous day when the MiG crashed and killed him at 10:30 am. His mother and brother were shopping for groceries in Kortrijk, and his father was working in Ypres.

== Political aftermath ==
The Belgian government made a formal protest to the Soviet Union for the lack of notification about the stray aircraft. The Belgian Foreign Minister Mark Eyskens expressed concern that there was no warning from the Soviet side during the flight and that there was a "notable slowness" on the part of the Soviets in disclosing whether the jet was carrying nuclear or toxic weapons. The Soviet Union paid Belgium $685,000 in compensation.
