= Antonio (Nery) Juarbe Pol Airport =

Airport in Puerto Rico

- IATA: ARE; ICAO: TJAB; FAA LID: ABO

Summary
- Airport type: Public
- Owner: Puerto Rico Ports Authority
- Serves: Arecibo, Puerto Rico
- Elevation AMSL: 23 ft (7.0 m)
- Coordinates: 18°27′04″N 66°40′32″W

Map
- Location of airport in Puerto Rico

Runways
Direction	Length		Surface
Direction	ft	m	Surface
8/26	3,975	1,212	Asphalt
- Source: FAA GCM

Antonio (Nery) Juarbe Pol Airport (IATA: ARE, ICAO: TJAB, FAA LID: ABO) is a public use airport located 3 miles (4.8 km) southeast of Arecibo, Puerto Rico. It is owned by the Puerto Rico Ports Authority. This airport is included in the National Plan of Integrated Airport Systems for 2011–2015, which categorized it as a general aviation airport.

The IATA and FAA airport codes differ because IATA had already assigned the "ABO" code to Aboisso Airport in Côte d'Ivoire.

== History ==
=== World War II ===
During World War II, the airport was used by the United States Army Air Forces Sixth Air Force conducting antisubmarine patrols. It was known as Arecibo Field. Flying units using the airfield were:

- 32d Fighter Squadron (36th Fighter Group) 11 December 1941 – 19 February 1942; 19 February – 9 March 1942 (P-36 Hawk)
- 23rd Fighter Squadron (36th Fighter Group), 11 March – 16 May 1943 (P-39 Airacobra)

=== Name ===
The airport was named after a prominent Arecibo-born businessman and pilot, who perished along with his wife and two passengers, on a flight from Isla Grande airport in San Juan to Arecibo on Mother's day, 1979. His wife's body was recovered the next day being picked up by fishermen from La Perla in San Juan. His body, the two other passengers, and the aircraft (a Cessna) were recovered from the sea on Father's day 1979. They were visiting his parents in San Juan for Mother's day. The weather was particularly rough that evening and is believed to be the cause of the accident.

== Facilities and aircraft ==
Antonio Nery Juarbe Pol Airport covers an area of 178 acres (72 ha) at an elevation of 23 feet (7 m) above mean sea level. It has one runway designated 8/26 with an asphalt surface measuring 3,975 by 60 feet (1,212 × 18 m).

Antonio (Nery) Juarbe Pol Airport has a large number of light-sport aircraft and ultralights. It has become the main center of Sport Aviation in Puerto Rico. The airport is very popular with the skydiving community, with a private skydiving school located there.

== See also ==
- Transport in Puerto Rico
- List of airports in Puerto Rico
