= Humacao Airport =

Airport in Humacao, Puerto Rico

Humacao Airport Dr Hermenegildo Ortiz Quinones Airport
- IATA: HUC; ICAO: none; FAA LID: X63

Summary
- Airport type: Public
- Owner: Puerto Rico Ports Authority
- Serves: Humacao, Puerto Rico
- Elevation AMSL: 33 ft (10 m)
- Coordinates: 18°08′17″N 65°48′03″W

Map
- Location in Puerto Rico

Runways
Direction	Length		Surface
Direction	ft	m	Surface
10/28	2,450	747	Asphalt
- Source: FAA GCM Google Maps

Humacao Airport (IATA: HUC, FAA LID: X63) is a public use airport owned by the Puerto Rico Ports Authority and located 1.6 miles (2.6 km) southeast of Humacao, a city in Puerto Rico.

== History ==
The airport once had domestic airline service from Luis Munoz Marin International Airport in San Juan, on an airline named Dorado Wings.

== Facilities ==
Humacao Airport covers an area of 14 acres (5.7 ha) at an elevation of 33 ft (10 m) above mean sea level. It has one asphalt paved runway designated 10/28 which measures 2,450 ft × 60 ft (747 m × 18 m).

The San Juan VORTAC (Ident: SJU) is located 21.4 nautical miles (24.6 mi) north-northwest of the airport. The Patty non-directional beacon (Ident: SJ) is located 23.1 nautical miles (26.6 mi) northwest of the airport.

== See also ==
- Transport in Puerto Rico
- List of airports in Puerto Rico
