= Kołobrzeg-Bagicz Airfield =

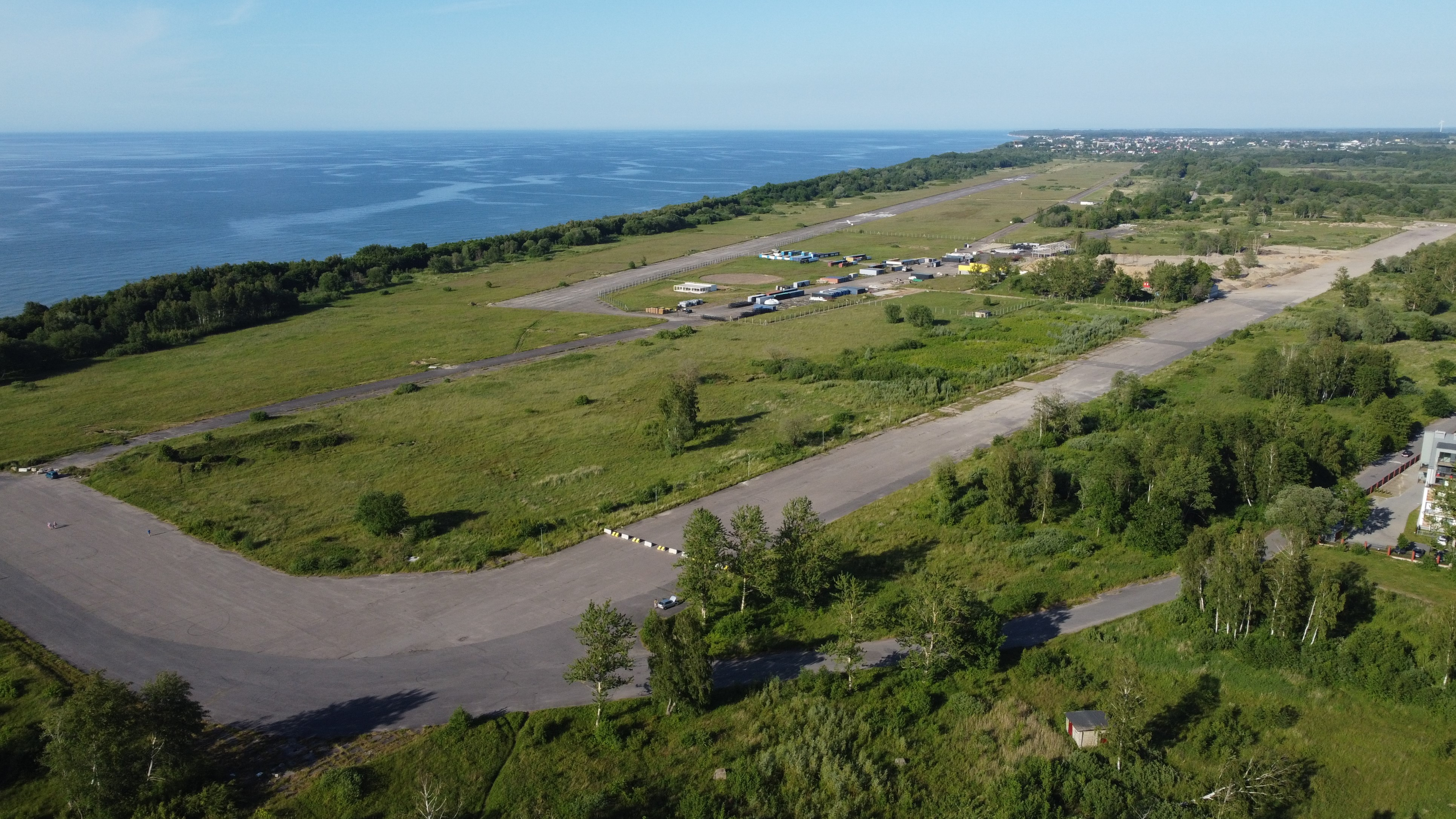
- Airfield in 2021
- IATA: none; ICAO: EPKG

Summary
- Operator: formerly Soviet Air Force
- Location: Kołobrzeg, Poland
- Built: 1936
- Elevation AMSL: 20 ft / 6 m
- Coordinates: 54.2007°N 15.6869°E

Map
- Location of airport in West Pomeranian Voivodeship Kołobrzeg-Bagicz Airfield (Poland)

Runways
Direction	Length		Surface
Direction	ft	m	Surface
07/255		2,500	concrete

Kołobrzeg-Bagicz Airfield is an airfield near the town of Kołobrzeg near Bagicz in West Pomeranian Voivodeship, Poland. The airfield was built between 1935 and 1936 as Kolberg Air Base for the Luftwaffe in the then province of Pomerania and is located directly on the Baltic Sea.

== History ==
=== 1935-1945 ===
The air base was built between 1935 and 1936 near Kolberg, located directly on the Baltic Sea in the area of the municipality of Bodenhagen. The runway had a grass surface. To the southeast of the air base were four large aircraft hangars and a large repair hangar. There were also other farm and accommodation buildings here. From April 1938, the first flying unit to be stationed here was the IV (Supplementary) Group of Jagdgeschwader 152. At the end of August 1939, Major General Egloff von Freyberg-Eisenberg was appointed commander of the airport area. During the German invasion of Poland in September 1939, the I Group of Kampfgeschwader 1 was based here.

=== 1945-1992 ===
On 18 March 1945, Polish and Soviet troops occupied the air base.

On 4 July 1989, a Mikoyan-Gurevich MiG-23 of the 871st Fighter Regiment of the Soviet Air Force took off from here. After an incident shortly after take-off, the pilot ejected from the aircraft, which flew more than 900km further west without a pilot before crashing near the Belgian town of Kortrijk, killing an 18-year-old resident.

The Soviet Air Force used the airfield until 28 May 1992.

=== 1992-present ===
Since October 2012, the site has been used as an airfield for general aviation under visual flight conditions (VFR).
