= Skytrain (Miami International Airport) =

Automated people mover at Miami International Airport, United States

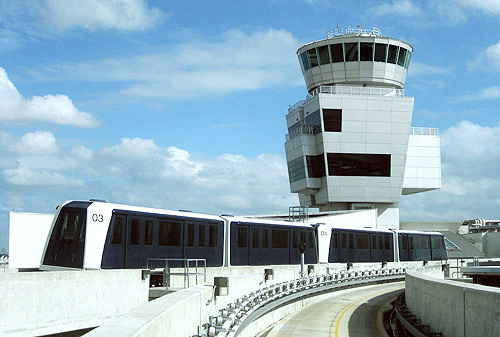
- Skytrain vehicle near the airport's control tower

Overview
- Status: Operational
- Owner: Miami-Dade Aviation Department
- Locale: North Terminal, Miami International Airport, Miami-Dade County, Florida
- Stations: 4

Service
- Type: Automated people mover
- Operator: Crystal Mover Services Inc.
- Rolling stock: 20 Crystal Mover cars
- Daily ridership: 40,000 (2015)

History
- Opened: September 15, 2010
- Suspended: September 15, 2023
- Reopened: March 29, 2024 (Note: Station 1 reopened on August 29, 2025.)

Technical
- Line length: 0.70 miles (1.12 km)
- Track length: 1.61 miles (2.59 km)
- Number of tracks: 2
- Character: Fully elevated
- Track gauge: 6 ft 27/32 in (1,850 mm)
- Electrification: 750 V DC via power rails
- Operating speed: 34 mph (55 km/h)
- Signaling: Fixed block signaling
- Train protection system: Automatic train control
- Highest elevation: 56 ft (17 m)
Route map
Legend
Legend
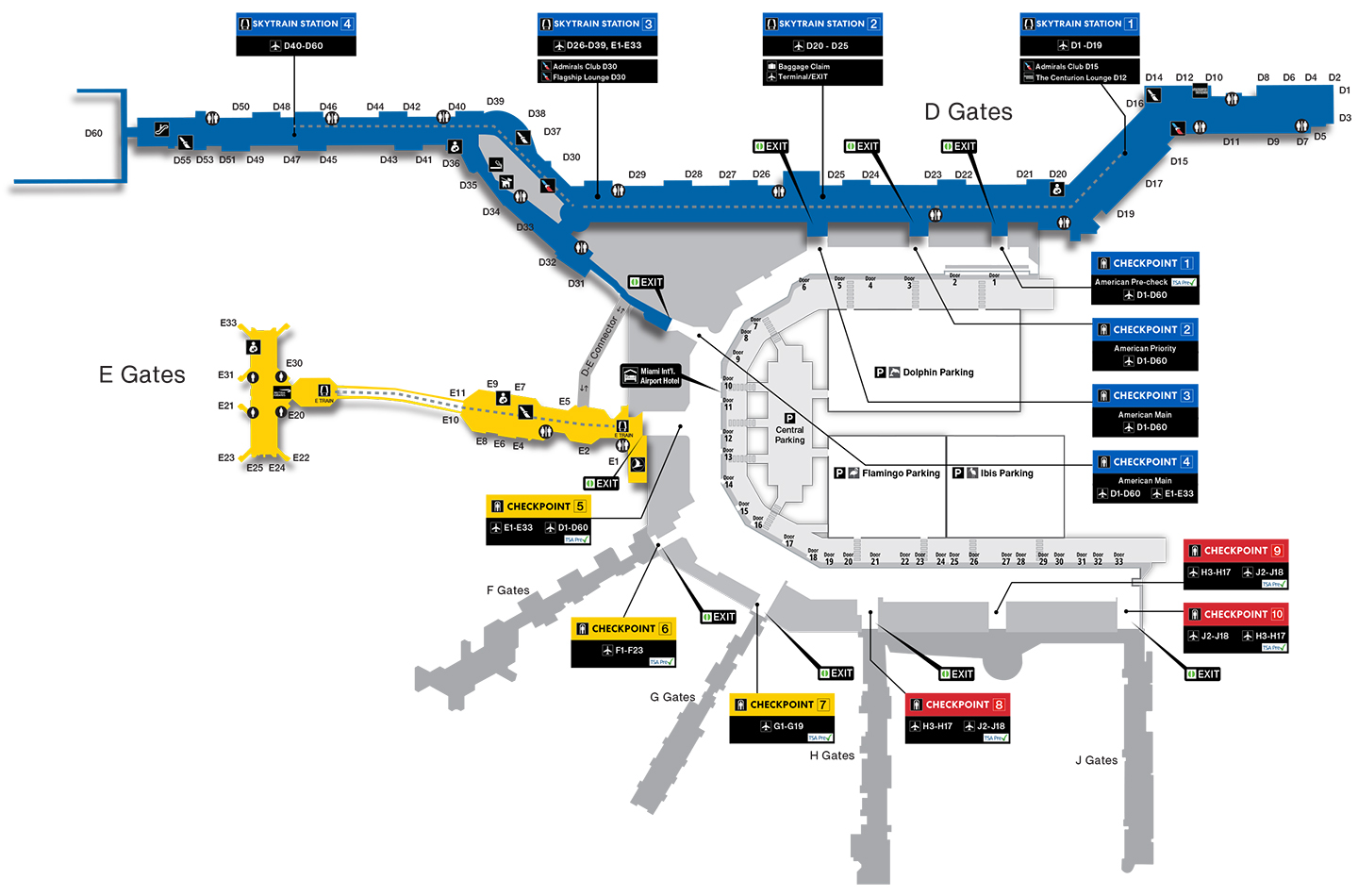

The Skytrain is an automated people mover (APM) at Miami International Airport (MIA) in Miami-Dade County, Florida, United States. One of three APMs at MIA, it operates within the airport's North Terminal and serves passengers in Concourse D, with four stations over a distance of 0.70 miles (1.12 km). It uses Crystal Mover technology with fully-automated trains that travel along the roof of the terminal. The system has transported up to 40,000 passengers daily.

The Skytrain was built as part of an airport expansion project, which included the construction of a new mile-long (1.6 km) terminal. Due to the building's length, the Skytrain was built to reduce walking times for passengers. Construction on the new terminal began in 2007 and Skytrain operations began in September 2010.

Due to extensive cracking detected in the system's infrastructure, Skytrain service was suspended for six months starting in September 2023. Three of the stations reopened in March 2024, and the full services commenced in August 2025.

== History ==
=== Planning and construction ===
In 1989, American Airlines made a decision to create an airline hub at MIA for its flights to Latin America and the Caribbean. A $6.5 billion capital improvement program was started in 1994 to expand the facilities at MIA, which included the construction of a new passenger terminal to be used exclusively by American Airlines. This new $2.95-billion facility, known as the North Terminal, would ultimately consolidate four of the airport's seven pier concourses into a single mile-long (1.6 km) linear concourse. This arrangement would allow for more daily aircraft operations per gate. To reduce connection times, an automated people mover (APM) was planned to transport passengers along the terminal's roof. It would become the second APM at MIA after the Concourse E people mover, a 0.5-mile (0.80 km) system with two stations that opened in 1980.

The proposed APM was designed with a level of service goal for domestic passengers to complete their connection within 30 minutes after entering the terminal. This would decrease walking distances by 70 percent for domestic connecting passengers and 40 percent for international connecting passengers, with 60 percent of all terminal passengers using the system daily. A contract was awarded in 1999 to Mitsubishi Heavy Industries of America (MHIA) and Sumitomo Corporation of Americas (SCOA) to design the APM system and build its rolling stock, with an original completion date scheduled for June 2005.

The North Terminal project was originally managed by American Airlines; however, following a series of schedule delays and budget overruns, project management was transferred in 2005 to the Miami-Dade Aviation Department (MDAD), the Miami-Dade County government agency that operates MIA. The trains were completed in Mihara, Japan the same year and remained there until the terminal infrastructure construction was complete. A storage area and test track were constructed adjacent to the manufacturing facilities in Mihara to "exercise" the trains' tires and electrical systems; MDAD paid SCOA $54,000 per month to keep the trains operational until they were ready for delivery.

The contract for the terminal's construction was awarded to the Parsons–Odebrecht joint venture, and construction began in March 2007. The cars were shipped from Japan and placed on the train guideway at MIA in June 2008. The first phase of the North Terminal opened to the public in November 2009; three stations and approximately 5,000 feet (1,500 m) of guideway were constructed at the time, and the remainder of the Skytrain construction was scheduled for completion the following year. Skytrain began operations on September 15, 2010, and the total cost of the system was $130 million (equivalent to $182 million in 2024).

The Skytrain was recognized in 2011 when MDAD received an "Award of Merit" for its construction (Note: The award was given to MDAD for the construction of both the Skytrain and the Regional Commuter Facility, a facility within the North Terminal for regional flights served by American Eagle.) from Engineering News-Record's annual competition for best construction projects in the Southeastern United States.

=== 2023–2025 suspension and repairs ===
During an inspection by engineers in May 2023, extensive cracking was discovered in three of the concrete piers underneath Station 1, prompting an engineering investigation. The cracking had been identified during an inspection in 2021, but the issues were determined to be "minor" at the time. By early September 2023, engineers had discovered "accelerated deterioration" of the piers. The investigation ultimately recommended an immediate closure of the system, and the Skytrain was suspended indefinitely at the end of the day on September 15. To supplement the lack of train service, American Airlines increased golf cart shuttle service inside the concourse, and MIA operated a temporary shuttle bus service.

After $4.2 million of emergency repairs, service resumed on March 29, 2024 between Stations 2, 3, and 4. Station 1 remained closed as it had greater damage and required "more extensive repair", which involved refilling the concrete in the damaged piers and wrapping the pier caps in a waterproof carbon-fiber membrane. Initially planned for mid-2024, the system resumed full operations following the reopening of Station 1 on August 29, 2025. The total cost of the structural repairs was $7.8 million.

== System ==
=== Stations ===
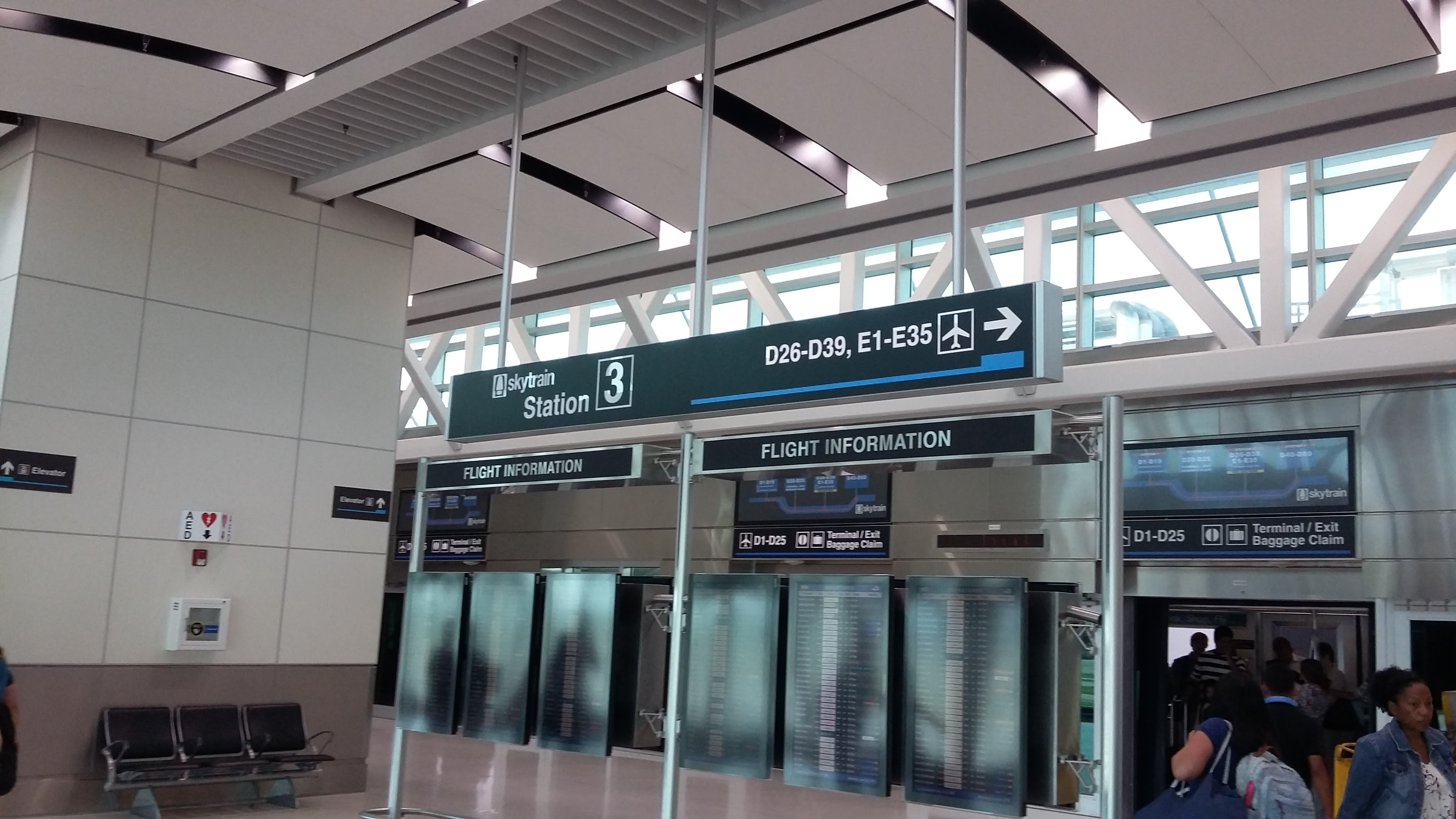
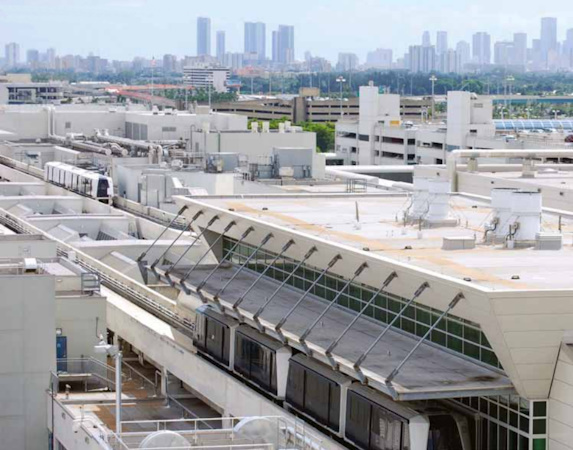
Station 3 platform (top) and building exterior (bottom)

The Skytrain travels above Concourse D, the airside zone of the North Terminal, and serves arriving and departing passengers who have cleared airport security. The concourse is located on the second level of the building and houses 50 gates, numbered D1 to D60. The Skytrain route runs for 0.70 miles (1.12 km), beginning at Station 1 on the east side of the concourse near Gate D17, and travels west to Station 4 on the opposite end of the concourse near Gate D47. The two intermediate stations include Station 2, which connects to the exit to the landside terminal area and baggage claim, and Station 3, which connects to Concourse E in the Central Terminal. The stations are located on the fifth level and can be accessed via entrances throughout the concourse. Passengers arriving from international flights can access the Skytrain from the third floor to travel to passport control at Station 3; these passengers board and alight using a separate lobby on the east side of each station and travel exclusively in the vehicle on the east side of the train.

As part of MIA's art and exhibitions program, two site-specific art pieces were installed at Skytrain stations in 2012: Roberto Juarez' mural MIA Flower Fence (2011) is featured on a wall in the Station 1 mezzanine, and Paul Villinski's sculpture Air Chair (2005) hangs from the ceiling of the concourse outside the Station 2 entrance.

List of stations
Station	Location	Connections	Coordinates
1	Near Gate D17	Gates D1–D19	25°47′53″N 80°16′26″W
2	Near Gate D24	Gates D20–D25; Terminal / exit; Baggage claim	25°47′50″N 80°16′36″W
3	Near Gate D30	Gates D26–D39; Concourse E (Gates E1–E33); Passport control (international arrivals only)	25°47′50″N 80°16′47″W
4	Near Gate D47	Gates D40–D60	25°47′52″N 80°17′01″W

=== Operations ===
The system uses automatic train operation in a pinched-loop configuration, where trains travel in a loop by reversing direction and changing tracks using crossovers at the end stations. As of 2023, it operates 19 hours a day, from 5:00 am until midnight, with four trains in service during peak hours from 8:00 am to 8:00 pm, and two or three trains in service at other times. The headway between trains is two to three minutes, and travel time along the entire route is four minutes. By contrast, walking the length of the concourse between the two farthest gates can take 22–30 minutes.

As a medium-capacity rail system, the Skytrain can transport up to 9,000 passengers per hour per direction, and had an average ridership of 40,000 passengers daily in 2015. It is one of three individual APMs at MIA, in addition to the eTrain (opened in 1980) and the MIA Mover (opened in 2011). Since its opening in 2010, Skytrain operations and maintenance (O&M) have been provided under contract by Crystal Mover Services Inc. (CMSI), a joint subsidiary of MHIA and SCOA. MDAD renewed CMSI's contract in 2022 to continue O&M services for an additional five years.

=== Infrastructure ===
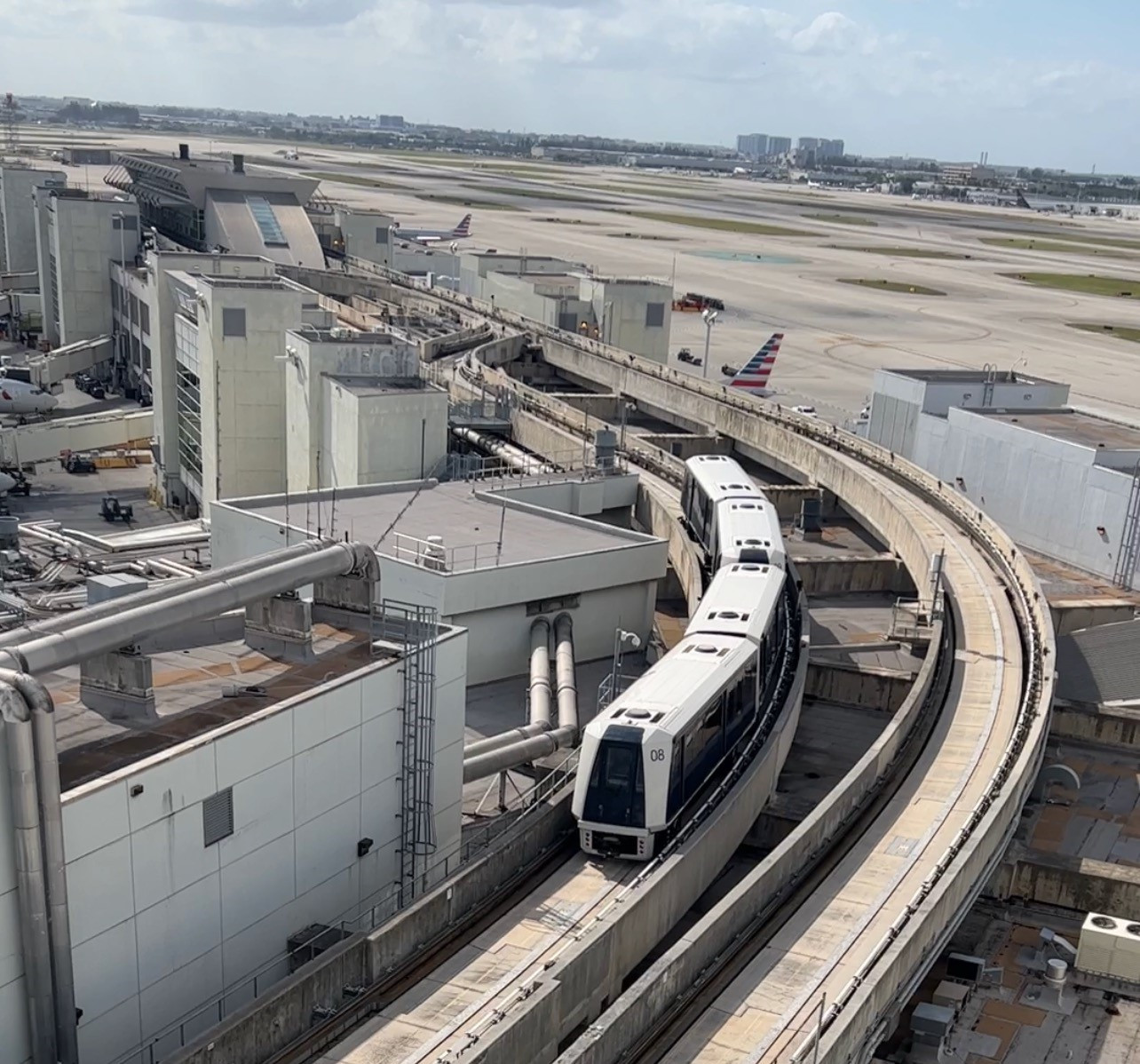
Guideway and track infrastructure along the terminal building's roof

Track infrastructure is entirely elevated above the roof of the North Terminal building, approximately 56 feet (17 m) above ground level, and is supported by over 100 concrete piers spaced 60 feet (18 m) apart. Trains travel along a double-track concrete fixed guideway with a track gauge of 6 ft 27/32 in (1,850 mm); the entire system includes 1.61 miles (2.59 km) of guideway and was designed to withstand hurricanes. To prevent train noise and vibrations from entering the building, parapet walls along the guideway serve as noise barriers, and rubber pads between the guideway girders and their supporting structures form a vibration isolation system. Each of the four stations have an island platform layout 4 feet (1.2 m) above the guideway with platform screen doors. The system's maintenance and storage facility, located to the south of Station 3, features a car wash and four maintenance tracks, which can store up to 18 cars; the facility also houses the system's control room and administrative offices.

=== Rolling stock ===
Skytrain rolling stock includes 20 automated Crystal Mover cars configured into five trains; each train compromises four cars split into two fixed married-pair vehicles. The separate vehicles in each train allow for secure transport of passengers arriving from international flights to the passport control facility. A single car is 38 feet 7 inches (11.75 m) long and 8 feet 10 inches (2.69 m) wide; it can accommodate up to 93 passengers, including eight seats and two spaces for wheelchairs, in compliance with the Americans with Disabilities Act. Up to four trains are put into operation simultaneously, with at least one kept in standby. The trains use rubber tires and can accelerate at a rate of 3.2 ft/s^{2} (0.97 m/s^{2}), with a maximum speed of 34 miles per hour (54 km/h). Service braking is performed by a combination of electronically controlled pneumatic brakes and regenerative braking, which can decelerate at 3.2 ft/s^{2} (0.97 m/s^{2}) in normal operations and at 4.4 ft/s^{2} (1.33 m/s^{2}) using emergency brakes. Trains are powered by a 750 V DC electrical system via power rails along the guideway sidewalls, which transmit power from two ground-level substations. Its protection system includes automatic train control with fixed block signaling. Plans to purchase two additional four-car trains were approved in 2022, and are scheduled to be delivered by the end of 2026.

== Incidents ==
On December 22, 2015, a train collided with the buffer stop at the end of the track at Station 4 during an overnight maintenance test. The lead vehicle derailed onto the roof of the concourse, while the rear vehicle remained on the track. Only one employee was on board at the time and no injuries were reported. Passenger service was suspended for investigation and the cause of the accident was ultimately determined to be the result of a short circuit that disabled the train's braking system. The circuiting was modified to remove the brake bypass function during normal train operations, and passenger service resumed on December 26.

== See also ==
- List of airport people mover systems
