= Yolanda Sanchez =

Cuban-American artist, professor and fine arts director

Yolanda Sanchez (1953-) is a Cuban-American artist, professor, and former fine arts director for the art program at Miami International Airport . She is known for non-figurative, abstract, expressionistic painting. Sanchez lives in Miami, Florida.

== Early life and education ==
Yolanda Sanchez was born in Havana, Cuba to a concert pianist mother. She emigrated with her mother at seven years old to Miami, where she was raised . Sanchez initially received her PhD in clinical psychology from Florida State University in 1979 and then proceeded to be involved in 24 years of practicing and teaching psychology. She later received a degree in fine arts from Florida International University in 1991 and then a Masters in Fine Arts from Yale University in painting in 1994. Sanchez was a Fulbright scholar from her fellowship in Spain studying El Greco, Goya, Miró, and Tapies .

== Career and style ==
Sanchez creates her work where she lives in Miami Beach. She created and managed the Arts and Cultural Affairs division of the Miami-Dade Aviation Department, while also holding an administrative position in the art program of the Miami International Airport, including oversight of the airport galleries, children’s art program, and curating the temporary exhibitions. Sanchez also acted as a liaison to the Professional Advisory Committee for the Miami Dade Art in Public Places program.

Sanchez is represented in the Museo Siyasa in Spain and the Museum of Craft and Folk Art in San Francisco, as well as in the permanent collections of the Graham University center and The Art Museum at FIU, the Museum of Art in Fort Lauderdale, and the Museum of Contemporary Art in Jacksonville. Sanchez describes her work as being influenced by color, light, texture, and the natural landscape, depicting the experience or memory of something rather than an exact representation. Her work also takes influence from poetry, dance, calligraphy, and Asian art, while also not straying from the syncretic culture of the Caribbean. Sanchez has prior study, training, and a personal background in both calligraphy and dance, explaining her use of the movement and energy of both in her works. When it comes to Asian art, it is the Chinese and Japanese ink painting that is integrated into her paintings. Sanchez aligns herself with American artists such as Franz Kline and Cy Twombly, and cited her historical influences as Matisse, Bonnard, Pollock, and Monet. In addition to her Cuban heritage, Sanchez also draws from the South Florida landscape, in the colors of the sea and flora.

== Development ==
Sanchez is originally a figurative painter and transitioned over into abstract painting, gradually using less and less recognizable imagery.

== Selected exhibitions, awards, and projects ==
- The Earth Laughs in Flowers, MIA Galleries, Miami International Airport, 2022
- Along the Road of Dreams, Kathryn Markel Fine Arts Gallery, New York City, NY, 2016
- Bojagi: The Living Tradition, Suwon/Hwasung Museum, South Korea, 2016
- Pigment and Paper, Kenise Barnes Fine Art, Larchmont, NY, 2016
- There is Only the Dance, J. Johnson Gallery, Jacksonville, FL, 2015
