= MIA Mover =

People mover at Miami International Airport

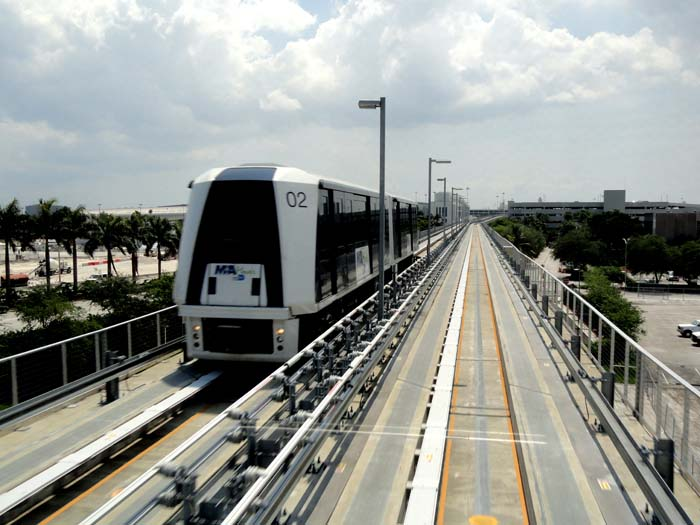
- MIA Mover en route to the MIA Station

Overview
- Status: Operating
- Locale: Miami International Airport
- Termini: Central Terminal; Miami Intermodal Center
- Stations: 2

Service
- Type: People mover
- Services: 1
- Operator: Miami-Dade Aviation Department
- Rolling stock: Mitsubishi Crystal Mover vehicles

History
- Opened: September 9, 2011

Technical
- Line length: 1.27 miles (2.04 km)
- Character: Serves non-sterile areas of the airport
- Electrification: Third rail
- Operating speed: 43 miles per hour (69 km/h) (top)
- Highest elevation: Elevated

The MIA Mover is an automated people mover (APM) system which opened at the Miami International Airport (MIA) in metropolitan Miami, Florida, United States on September 9, 2011. The MIA Mover is designed to quickly transport landside passengers between Miami International Airport's Main Terminal and the Miami Intermodal Center (MIC). The MIA Mover is one of three separate automated people movers operating at the airport. The others are the Skytrain, which operates within Concourse D, and the MIA e Train people mover connecting Concourse E's satellite building.

== History ==
In 2007, construction of a people mover instead of an extension of the existing Metrorail system to the airport became the preferred option for local authorities to provide greater connectivity to the airport terminals (Metrorail will connect at Miami Airport Station). On March 2, 2009, ground was officially broken for the project. Projected to transport 48,000 daily visitors by 2020, the MIA Mover construction utilized design-build methods and was paid for from a combination of revenue from the Miami-Dade Aviation Department's Capital Improvement Program and the Florida Department of Transportation (FDOT).

In May 2012, MIA Mover suffered a minor derailment, and a breakdown in July 2017 required riders to walk along the tracks escorted by fire fighters.

Starting in 2026, the MIA Mover connects riders from the airport to Nu Stadium, which is a about half a mile away from the Miami Intermodal Center. Dam S25-B is currently being used as a temporary footbridge to cross the Tamiami Canal and connect the two sites. A more permanent footbridge could be built in the future.

== System ==
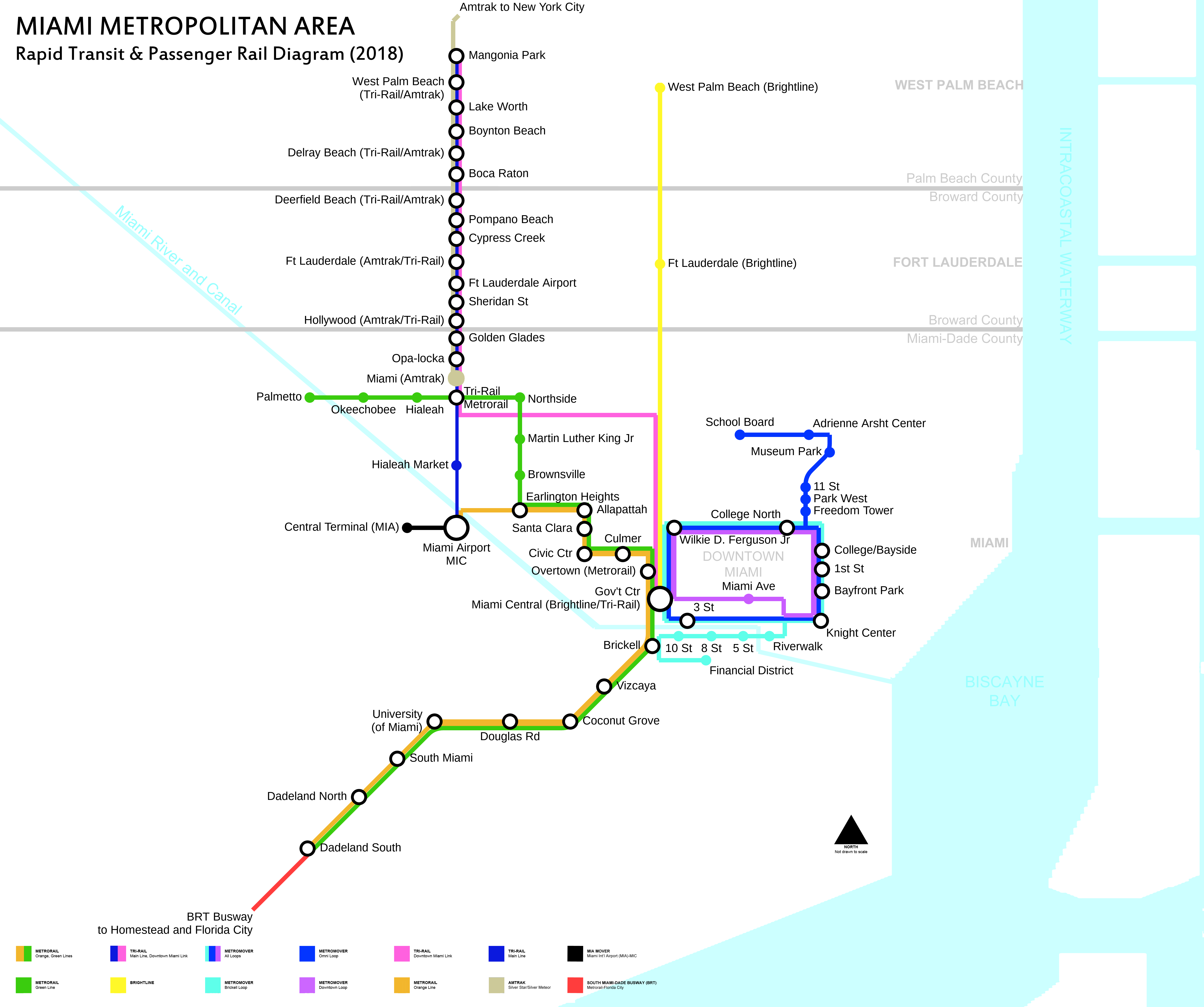
MIA Mover (black) connects to many transit systems at the Miami Intermodal Center (MIC).

Costing an estimated $259 million to complete, the 1.27 miles (2.04 km) link travels east from the MIA Station along Central Boulevard and NW 21st Street, where it curves north into the MIC Station. The ride lasts approximately three minutes. The concrete guideways are generally elevated an average of 40 feet (12 m) above grade and are supported by concrete piers every 120 feet (37 m). The vehicles used are Mitsubishi Heavy Industries Crystal Movers (The same model also operates on the Skytrain in Concourse D).

=== Stations ===
The MIA Mover has two stations:

- MIC Station is the eastern terminus of the line located on the fourth floor of the Miami Intermodal Center. The station contains direct access to the MIC's rental car center and Miami Airport Station where connections can be made to Metrorail, Tri-Rail, buses and taxicabs. The station is being constructed by FDOT.
- MIA Station is the western terminus of the line, located on the third floor of the main Miami International Airport terminal building between the Flamingo and Dolphin parking garages. Constructed by the Miami-Dade Aviation Department, a storage and maintenance facility for the automated people mover vehicles is located beneath the MIA Station.

== See also ==
- List of airport people mover systems
- Transportation in Miami
- Metromover
- Metrorail
- Tri-Rail
- Tomorrowland Transit Authority PeopleMover

== Bibliography ==
- Schroeder, B.M. "MIA Mover APM: A Fixed Facilities Design-Build Perspective." Automated People Movers, 2009: Connecting People, Connecting Places, Connecting Modes: Proceedings of the Twelfth International Conference, May 31-June 3, 2009 : Atlanta, Georgia. Ed. Robert R. Griebenow. American Society of Civil Engineers.
