= ETrain (Miami International Airport) =

Automated people mover at Miami International Airport, United States

eTrain
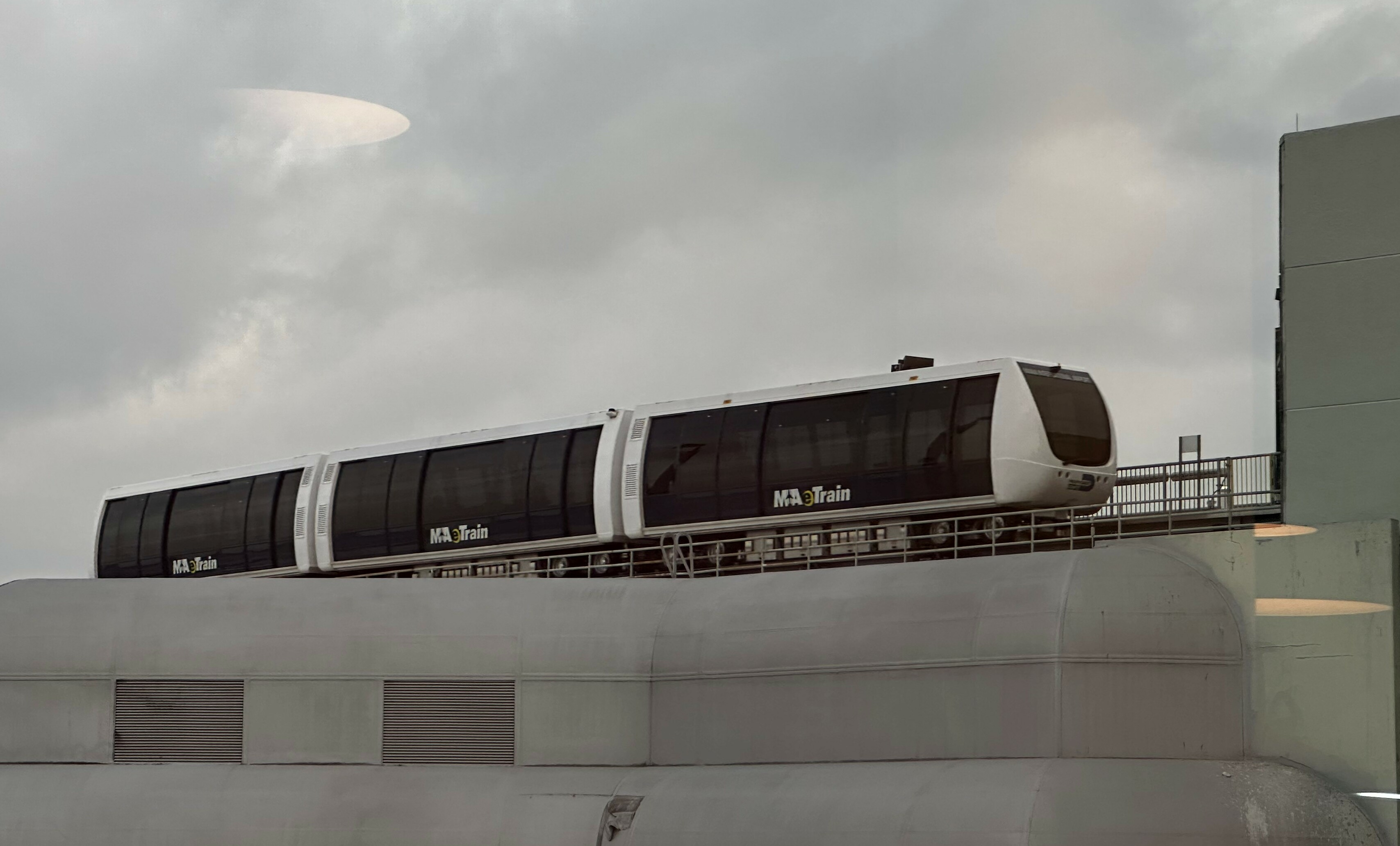
- eTrain vehicle in transit

Overview
- Status: Operating
- Locale: Miami International Airport
- Stations: 2

Service
- Type: People mover
- Rolling stock: 6 Leitner-Poma MiniMetro vehicles

History
- Opened: 1980 (rebuilt 2016)

Technical
- Character: Serves Concourse E
- Highest elevation: Elevated

The eTrain is one of three automated people mover systems operating at Miami International Airport (along with the Skytrain and the MIA Mover). It connects the satellite building of Concourse E (which contains gates E20-E33) with the rest of Concourse E (Gates E2-E11) which is connected to the main terminal. The system opened in 2016 replacing an earlier system and was built at a cost of $87 million.

== Operation ==
The MIA eTrain consists of two three-car cable-driven MiniMetro trains developed by Leitner-Poma (unlike the Skytrain and MIA Mover which use Mitsubishi Crystal Mover vehicles). The two trains run on parallel independent guideways and shuttle back and forth between the two stations.

== History ==
The eTrain opened in 2016 and replaced an earlier system that was built in 1980. The original system, which did not have an official name, was built by the Westinghouse Electric Corporation, whose transportation division is now owned by Bombardier Transportation. It was Westinghouse's second airport people mover system in Florida, after the Tampa International Airport People Movers. It operated in a similar fashion to the current system and used six Westinghouse C-100 vehicles in two three-car trains, which were also the same vehicles that originally operated on Downtown Miami's Metromover, which opened in 1986.

By the mid 2000s, the system was showing its age. On November 28, 2008, the train on the south guideway failed to stop at the main station and crashed into the wall at the end of the line, injuring seven people. After the crash, the system continued to operate with only the train on the north guideway with the south guideway taken out of service. When the system was replaced with the eTrain, the out-of-service south guideway was converted first with the north train and guideway being converted and replaced once the south train was operational.

== See also ==
- List of airport people mover systems
