= Miami International Airport =

Airport serving Miami, Florida, United States

- Miami International Airport in January 2026
- IATA: MIA; ICAO: KMIA; FAA LID: MIA; WMO: 72202

Summary
- Airport type: Public
- Owner/Operator: Miami-Dade Aviation Department
- Serves: Miami metropolitan area
- Location: Miami-Dade County, Florida, U.S.
- Opened: September 15, 1928; 98 years ago
- Hub for: ABX Air; American Airlines; Amerijet International; Atlas Air; Avianca Cargo; Eastern Air Express; FedEx Express; IBC Airways; Northern Air Cargo; Sky Lease Cargo; USA Jet Airlines; UPS Airlines; Western Global Airlines; World Atlantic Airlines
- Focus city for: Avianca; SKYhigh Dominicana; LATAM Airlines; Polar Air Cargo
- Operating base for: Frontier Airlines; Global Crossing Airlines
- Time zone: EST (UTC−05:00)
  - Summer (DST): EDT (UTC−04:00)
- Elevation AMSL: 3 m (9.8 ft)
- Coordinates: 25°47′36″N 080°17′26″W
- Website: miami-airport.com

Maps
- FAA airport diagram
- Interactive map of Miami International Airport

Runways
Direction	Length		Surface
Direction	m	ft	Surface
8L/26R	2,621	8,600	Asphalt
8R/26L	3,202	10,506	Asphalt
9/27	3,967	13,016	Asphalt
12/30	2,853	9,360	Asphalt

Statistics (2025)
- Total passengers: 55,314,661 ▼1.09%
- Aircraft operations: 502,771
- Total cargo (freight+mail) (tons): 3,448,913
- Source:Miami Airport

Miami International Airport (IATA: MIA, ICAO: KMIA, FAA LID: MIA), historically known as Wilcox Field, is the primary international airport serving Miami and its surrounding metropolitan area in the U.S. state of Florida. It hosts over 1,000 daily flights to 195 domestic and international destinations, including most countries in Central and South America and the Caribbean. The airport is in an unincorporated area in Miami-Dade County, Florida, It is located approximately 6 miles (9.7 km) west-northwest of downtown Miami, adjacent to the cities of Miami and Miami Springs, and the village of Virginia Gardens. Nearby cities include Hialeah, Doral, and the census-designated place of Fontainebleau.

In 2021, Miami International Airport became the busiest international cargo airport in the U.S. and the busiest U.S. gateway for international passengers, surpassing John F. Kennedy International Airport in New York City. As of 2021, it is the 10th busiest airport in the U.S. with 17,500,096 passengers for the year. It is Florida's busiest airport by total aircraft operations and total cargo traffic. The airport is American Airlines' third-largest hub and serves as its primary gateway to Latin America and the Caribbean. Miami also serves as a focus city for Avianca, Frontier Airlines, and LATAM, both for passengers and cargo operations.

In 2024, MIA Airport served nearly 56 million passengers and saw 3 million tons of cargo passing through MIA, recording three consecutive record years for passenger volume and five straight years of cargo volume.

Miami International Airport covers 3,300 acres (1,300 ha). It is South Florida's main airport for long-haul international flights and a hub for the Southeastern United States with passenger and cargo flights to cities throughout the Americas, Europe, Africa, and Asia. It is the largest gateway between the U.S. and Central, South America and the Caribbean and one of the largest airline hubs in the nation.

== History ==
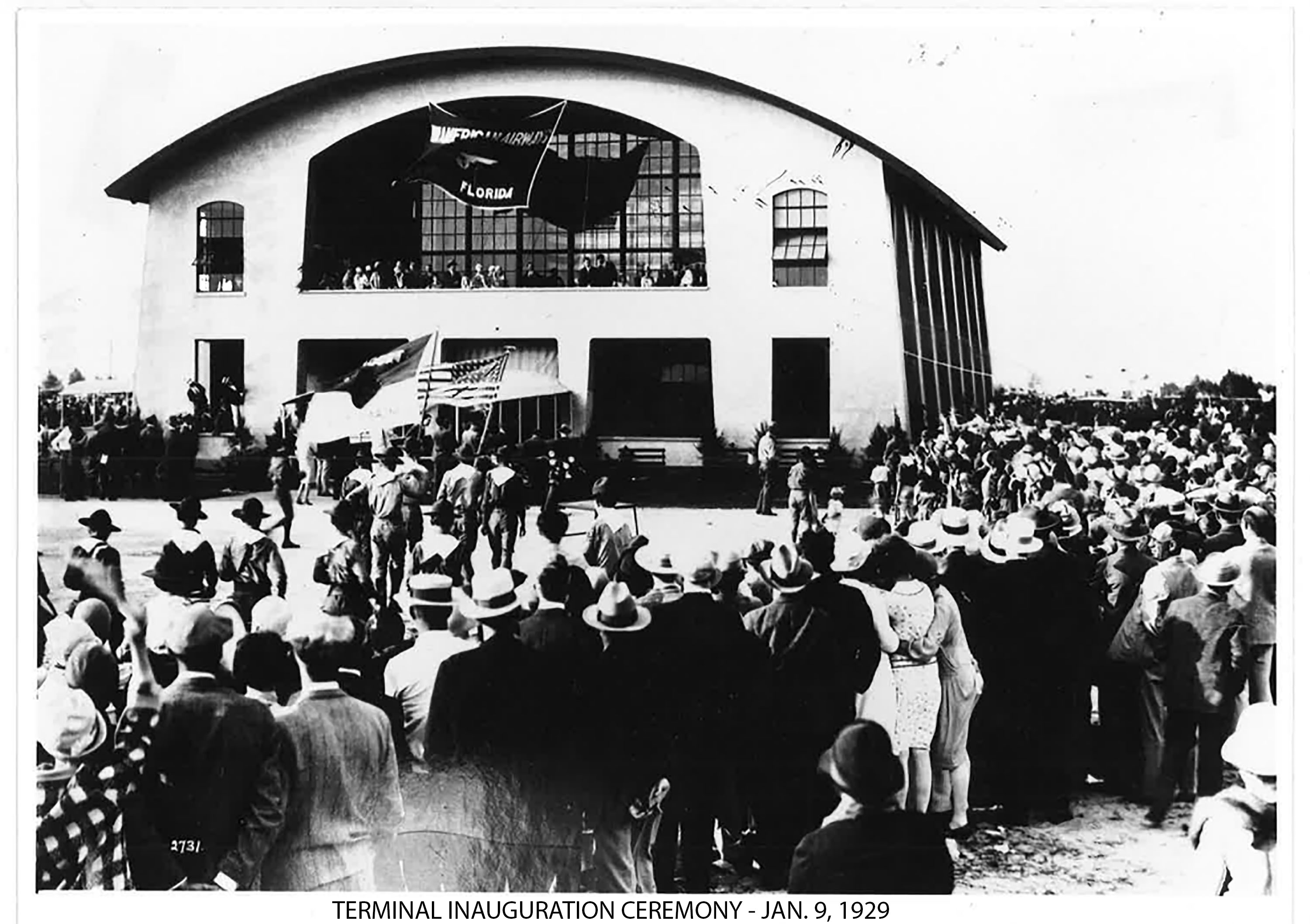
Crowds gather around Pan American Airways' new international passenger terminal, the first U.S. mainland port of entry for visitors arriving in the U.S. via air, during the terminal's opening on January 9, 1929.

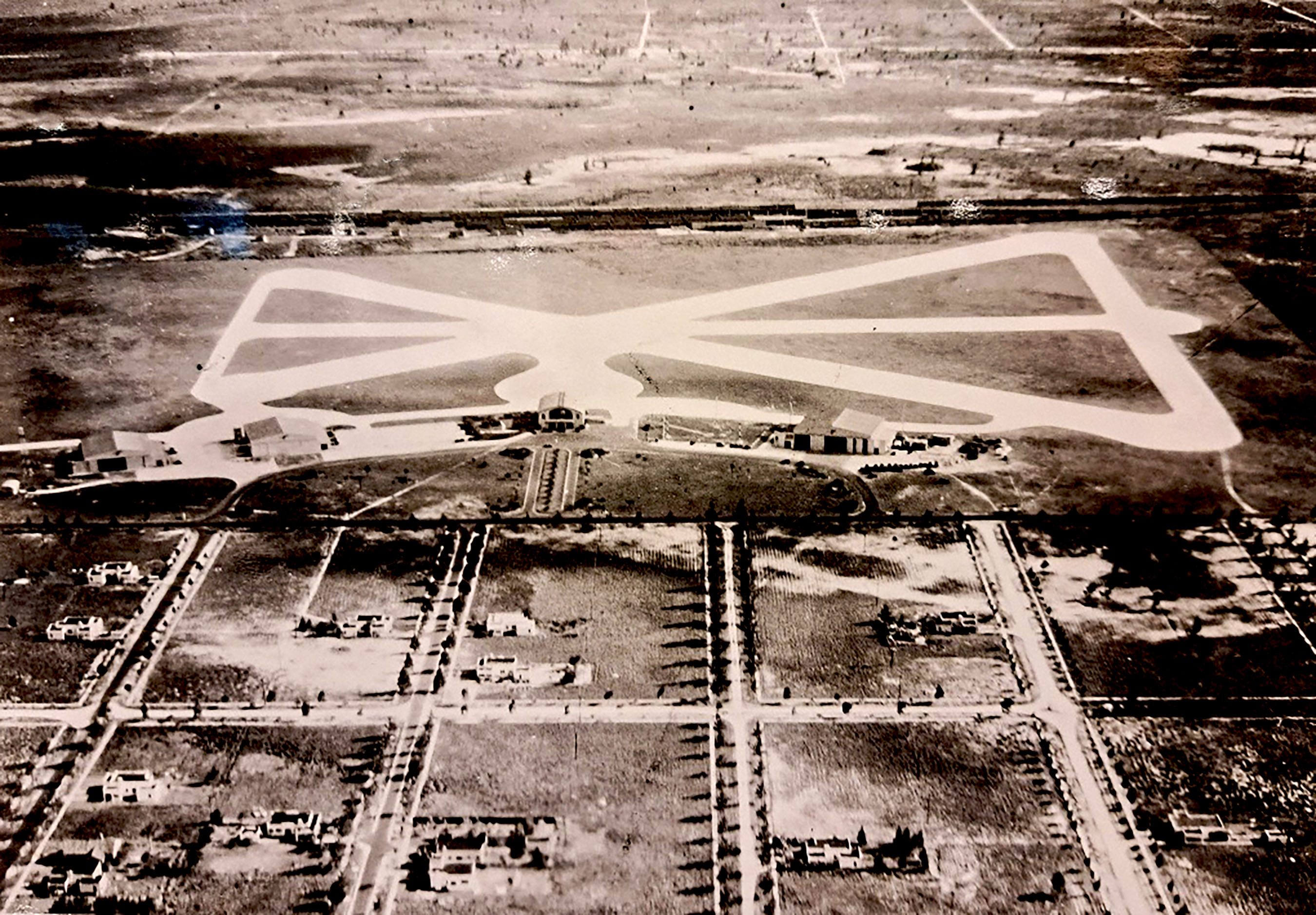
Aerial View of Pan American Field and Pan American Airport on NW 36th Street in Miami in 1929. The airport terminal with domed roof is located at center, flanked by two hangars to the east and one to the west. Only the west hangar, Pan Am Hangar 5, located at its original site off NW 36th Street, remains in existence.

In June 1928, Pan American Airways acquired 116 acres of land on NW 36th Street for the purpose of building a privately owned and operated international airport in Miami, Florida. The establishment of a commercial airport and of regularly scheduled international passenger airline service by Pan Am was a transformative event for the City of Miami. By September 1928, Pan Am had begun to operate regularly scheduled Air Mail service between Miami and Havana. On January 9, 1929, Pan American Airport, also known as Pan American Field, was officially dedicated at a ceremony that included the inauguration of a newly expanded route system to Nassau, Santiago (Cuba), Haiti, the Dominican Republic and San Juan, Puerto Rico. The ceremony was attended by thousands of residents, government officials, and aviation celebrities, who saw in the new airport the promise of a bright new future in international aviation for Miami. It was the first mainland airport in the United States to have international port of entry facilities. The passenger terminal building, designed by Delano & Aldrich of New York City, was the most advanced and luxurious in the country. Three hangars, two on the east and one on the west, provided housing and maintenance facilities for Pan Am's fleet of Sikorsky amphibian and Fokker aircraft.

During the first two years of its operation, it was from this busy airport that Pan American Airways pioneered U.S. international passenger aviation. By the end of 1930, for the first time in history, Pan Am had succeeded in establishing regularly scheduled Air Mail and passenger airline service from the U.S. to the West Indies, Caribbean, and Central and South America.

On April 1, 1930, a collaboration between Pan American and Eastern Air Transport (later to become known as Eastern Air Lines) was begun after Pan American Airport at NW 36th Street was designated as the first international field Post Office in the country. The announcement followed almost a year’s worth of efforts by the U.S. postal service to effect greater efficiencies in U.S. Air Mail delivery by coordinating the schedules of airlines involved in operating international and domestic Air Mail routes with railway connections to cities not served by airports.

On January 1, 1931, Eastern Air Transport inaugurated regularly scheduled passenger service from Miami to New York from Pan Am’s NW 36th Street Airport. It was another historic event, a collaboration between the two airlines that made Miami the clearing point for a coordinated airline passenger system that extended from as far north as Canada to the tip of South America. No other U.S. city could boast such a distinction.

Eastern Air Lines officially took up primary residence at the 36th Street Airport in August 1935.

In 1940, Intercontinent Corporation, owned by William Pawley, built an aircraft manufacturing plant on land acquired immediately east of Pan American Field. The City and County, eager to encourage the growth of an aircraft manufacturing industry in Miami, agreed to finance and build runways and ground facilities at the Intercontinent plant, including an east–west runway that extended from Le Jeune Road as far west as Pan American Field, where it intersected with Pan Am's east–west runway. National Airlines, which had been operating in Miami at Miami's city-owned Municipal Airport since 1937, moved to the 36th Street Airport in 1942. National built a combined maintenance and terminal facility on LeJeune Road, across the street from the airport and would stop traffic on the road in order to taxi aircraft to and from its terminal. Miami Army Airfield opened in 1943 on 1400 acres of land acquired during World War II to the south of Pan American Field. The two airfields were listed in some directories as a single facility.

Following World War II, the Dade County Port Authority embarked on a long-planned airport expansion in order to meet Miami's increasing commercial aviation needs. On December 31, 1945, a formal agreement between the County and Pan Am transferring ownership of the airport to the county was signed, becoming effective at 1:00 AM on January 1, 1946. Thus ended any distinct identity of Pan American Field. The Port Authority also acquired Intercontinent's former holdings, which were subsequently leased to Eastern Air Lines, and changed the name of the newly expanded airport to Miami International Airport. Pan American's former NW 36th Street terminal building continued to serve as the hub for the new Miami International Airport. Between 1945 and 1950, the Port Authority cobbled together thousands more acres adjacent to and south of the airport, including the Army's former air base; the Seaboard Air Line Railroad property; and additional parcels, with the intention of meeting Miami's future aviation needs. The result was a County-owned, Miami International Airport based at NW 36th Street that by 1948 had grown to 2500 acres. The former domed-roofed Pan Am terminal building was extensively remodeled and enlarged, the words “Miami International Airport” now curving across its façade. The new airport was officially dedicated January 4, 1950. United States Air Force Reserve troop carrier and rescue squadrons also operated from the airport from 1949 through 1959, when the last unit relocated to nearby Homestead Air Force Base (now Homestead Air Reserve Base). In the late 1940s, Pan Am and Eastern also expanded their bases at MIA on NW 36th Street, which made the airport the world's largest commercial aircraft maintenance and overhaul facility at the time.

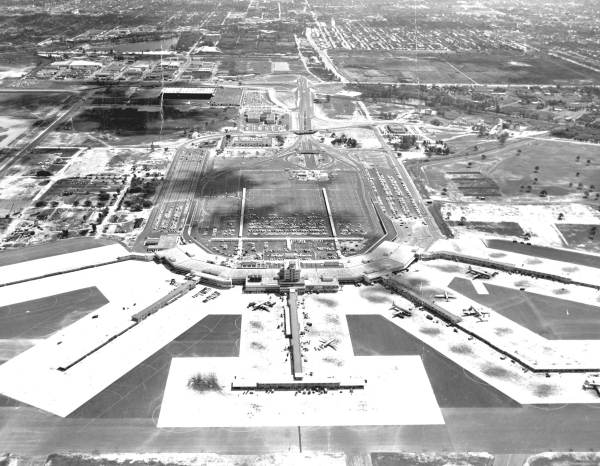
20th Street Terminal in the 1950s

In the 1950s, a continuing boom in post-World War II passenger aviation stretched the county's expanded airport to capacity. Scheduled airlines had outstripped ships, trains and buses to become the state's as well as the nation's largest carriers of interstate and international traffic. Delta had joined Pan Am, Eastern and National to become MIA's "Big Four" carriers and the airport also served a host of smaller scheduled and non-scheduled airlines. A new jet age loomed. Plans for an entirely new airport, to be built from scratch on land south and east of the existing facility were set in motion. On February 1, 1959, after years of planning and construction, Miami's brand-new Miami International Airport was formally inaugurated at 20th Street, on what was dubbed Wilcox Field in honor of Port Authority attorney J. Mark Wilcox who had been instrumental in bringing the project to completion. No longer needed, the former domed-roofed terminal building on NW 36th Street was torn down in November 1962. This part of MIA along NW 36th Street is known today as MIA's north field.

When it was dedicated in 1959, MIA's new 20th Street Terminal was the largest central airport terminal in the world, with five concourses (Concourses C-G) and a 270-room hotel. In 1961, the terminal was expanded with the addition of a sixth concourse (Concourse H) on the south side, which was the first concourse at the airport to include jetways. By 1965, the original five concourses were renovated with jetways added to them.

The 20th Street Terminal was expanded in the 1970s. Parking garages were added just east of the terminal and Concourse B opened on the north side of the terminal in 1973 to accommodate the expansion of Eastern Air Lines. In 1977, Concourse E's satellite terminal opened. The satellite was originally connected with shuttle buses, though a people mover was built to connect the satellite in 1980.

Nonstop flights to Chicago and Newark started in late 1946, but nonstops didn't reach west beyond St. Louis and New Orleans until January 1962. Nonstop transatlantic flights to Europe began in 1970. In the late 1970s and early 1980s, Air Florida had a hub at MIA, with a nonstop flight to London, England which it acquired from National upon the latter's merger with Pan Am. Air Florida ceased operations in 1982 after the crash of Air Florida Flight 90. British Airways flew a Concorde SST (supersonic transport) triweekly between Miami and London via Dulles International Airport in Washington, D.C., from 1984 to 1991.

The terminal was further expanded in the 1980s. The original Concourses D and E were rebuilt early in the decade and Concourses B and F were expanded. Pedestrian bridges with moving walkways were built in 1985 connecting the parking garages with the third level of the terminal. Within the next few years, the moving walkway system on the third level was expanded to run along the full length of the terminal.

After former Apollo 8 astronaut Frank Borman became president of Eastern Air Lines in 1975, he moved Eastern's headquarters from Rockefeller Center in New York City to Building 16 in the northeast corner of MIA, Eastern's maintenance base. Eastern remained one of the largest employers in the Miami metropolitan area until ongoing labor union unrest, coupled with the airline's acquisition by Texas Air in 1986, ultimately forced the airline into bankruptcy in 1989. Eastern operated out of Concourses B through D on the north side of the terminal, where American's Concourse D stands today. Concourse E was the home for most international carriers, while Pan Am operated out of Concourses E and F.

Starting in 2026, MIA became a hub for soccer fans for two reasons: first, the nearby Nu Stadium of Major League Soccer's Inter Miami CF has opened; connected to the airport via the MIA Mover. Secondly, it was a main transportation point for fans for events specific to the 2026 FIFA World Cup in South Florida (and for connecting flights to other host cities), and the seven games that were hosted at Hard Rock Stadium, roughly 18 miles north of the airport.

=== American Airlines hub ===
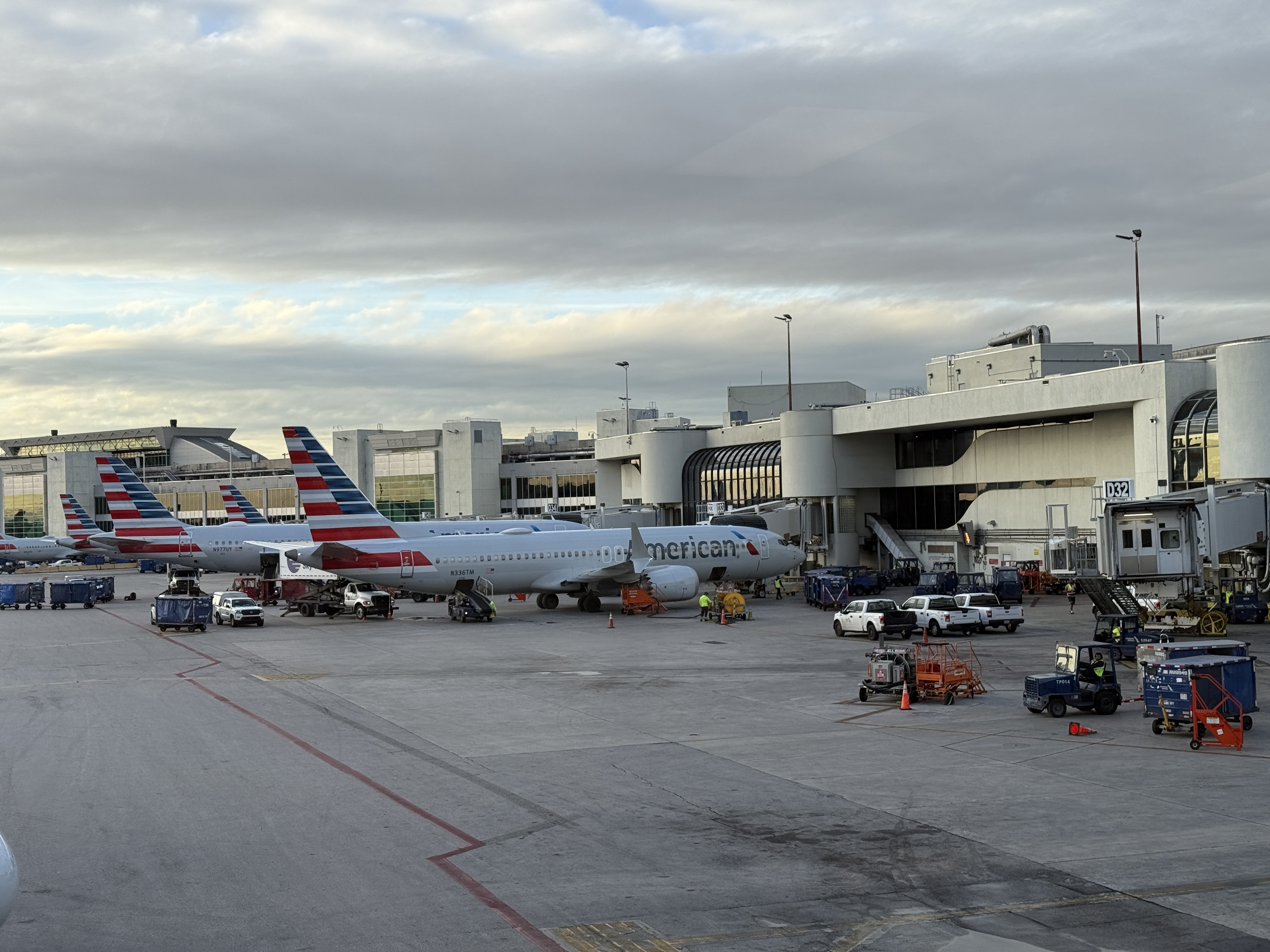
American Airlines planes at Concourse D in January 2026

Amid Eastern's turmoil, American Airlines CEO Robert Crandall sought a new hub in order to utilize new aircraft which AA had on order. AA studies indicated that Delta Air Lines would provide strong competition on most routes from Eastern's hub at Hartsfield–Jackson Atlanta International Airport in Atlanta, but that MIA had many key routes only served by Eastern. American Airlines announced that it would establish a base at MIA in August 1988. Lorenzo considered selling Eastern's profitable Latin America routes to AA as part of a Chapter 11 reorganization of Eastern in early 1989 but backed out in a last-ditch effort to rebuild the MIA hub. The effort quickly proved futile, and American Airlines purchased the routes (including the route authority between Miami and London then held by Eastern sister company Continental Airlines) in a liquidation of Eastern which was completed in 1990. Later in the 1990s, American transferred more employees and equipment to MIA from its failed domestic hubs at Nashville, Tennessee, and Raleigh–Durham, North Carolina. The hub grew from 34 daily departures in 1989 to 157 in 1990, 190 in 1992, and a peak of 301 in 1995, including long-haul flights to Europe and South America. Today Miami is American's largest air freight hub and is the main connecting point in the airline's north–south international route network.

In December 1992, South African Airways launched flights to Johannesburg via Cape Town using a Boeing 747. The company's codeshare agreement with American Airlines supported the route. The carrier later decided to codeshare with Delta Air Lines instead, which operated a hub in Atlanta. Consequently, South African replaced its Miami service with a flight to Atlanta in January 2000.

Concourse A was built on the northeast side of the terminal in 1995, and Concourse H was rebuilt in 1997. Concourse J was built in August 2007 along with an expansion of the terminal on the south side.

American began the development of the current North Terminal in the 1990s. Concourses B and C were demolished as part of the project with Concourse A becoming the eastern end of the expanded Concourse D. Although the terminal was originally scheduled to be completed in 2004, numerous delays arose in the construction process, and Miami-Dade County took over control of the project in 2005, at which time the project had a budget of $2.85 billion. The terminal was ultimately completed in 2011 and included Skytrain, an automated people mover system, as well as a wing for American Eagle commuter flights.

=== Other hub operations ===
Pan Am was acquired by Delta Air Lines in 1991, but filed for bankruptcy shortly thereafter. Its remaining international routes from Miami to Europe and Latin America were sold to United Airlines for $135 million as part of Pan Am's emergency liquidation that December. United's Latin American hub offered 24 daily departures in the summer of 1992, growing to 36 daily departures to 21 destinations in the summer of 1994, but returned to 24 daily departures in the summer of 1995 and never expanded further. United ended flights from Miami to South America, and shut down its Miami crew base, in May 2004, reallocating most Miami resources to its main hub in O'Hare International Airport in Chicago. United ceased all mainline service to Miami in 2005 with the introduction of its low-cost product Ted.

Iberia also established a Miami hub in 1992, positioning a fleet of DC-9 aircraft at MIA to serve destinations in Central America and the Caribbean. The hub took advantage of rights granted under the 1991 bilateral aviation agreement between the United States and Spain. During the 1990s, the airport had sterile international-to-international transit facilities in Concourse D (American, British, and Alitalia) and Concourse F (Iberia and four Central American carriers), and there were plans to establish a sterile corridor for international connecting passengers between six concourses. However, the September 11, 2001, attacks made it necessary for many foreigners to obtain a visa in order to transit the United States, and as a result, Iberia closed its hub in 2004, around the same time as United.

=== Future ===
MIA is projected to process 77 million passengers and 4 million tons of freight annually by 2040. To meet such a demand, the Miami-Dade Board of County Commissioners approved a $5 billion improvement plan to take place over 15 years, concluding in 2035. The comprehensive plan includes concourse optimization, construction of two on-site luxury hotels, the demolition of Concourse G, and expansion of the airport's cargo capacity.

== Facilities ==
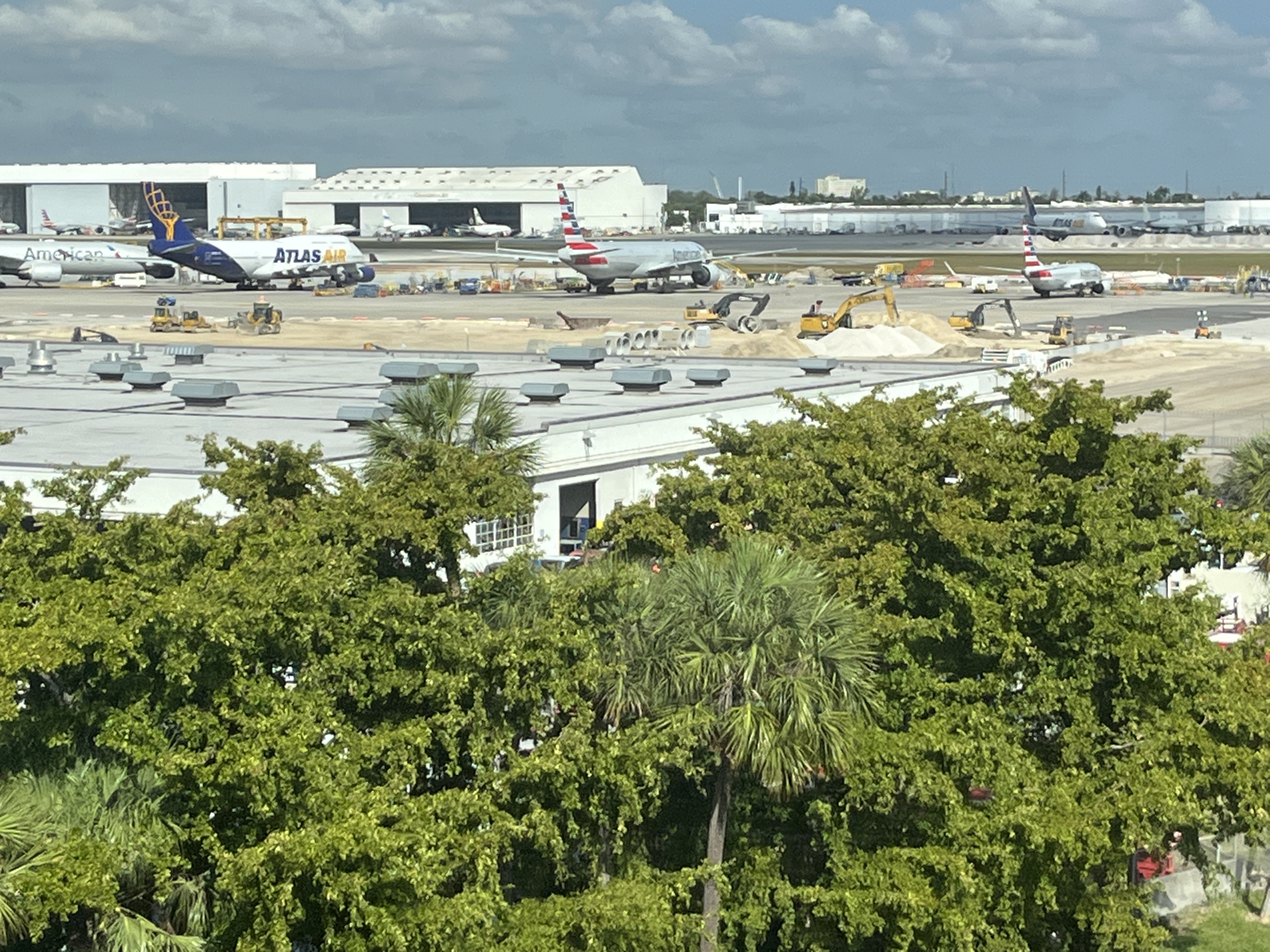
Apron and hangars at Miami International Airport in February 2022

=== Terminals ===
Miami International Airport contains three terminals (North, Central, and South) and six concourses for a total of 131 gates. With the exception of Concourse G, all concourses contain gates to access U.S. Customs and Border Protection facilities.

- Concourse D contains 51 gates. Opened in 1959 as Concourse 5. Combined with the former Concourse A and newly built gates on the sites of former Concourses B & C as part of the North Terminal Development Program, with construction completed in March 2013.
- Concourse E contains 18 gates. Opened in 1959 as Concourse 4 and rebuilt in the 1980s. The satellite terminal opened in 1977.
- Concourse F contains 19 gates. Opened in 1959 as Concourse 3 and rebuilt in the 1980s.
- Concourse G contains 14 gates. Opened in 1959 as Concourse 2.
- Concourse H contains 13 gates. Opened in 1961 as Concourse 1. Partially rebuilt in the late 1990s with construction completed in March 1998
- Concourse J contains 15 gates. Opened in August 2007.

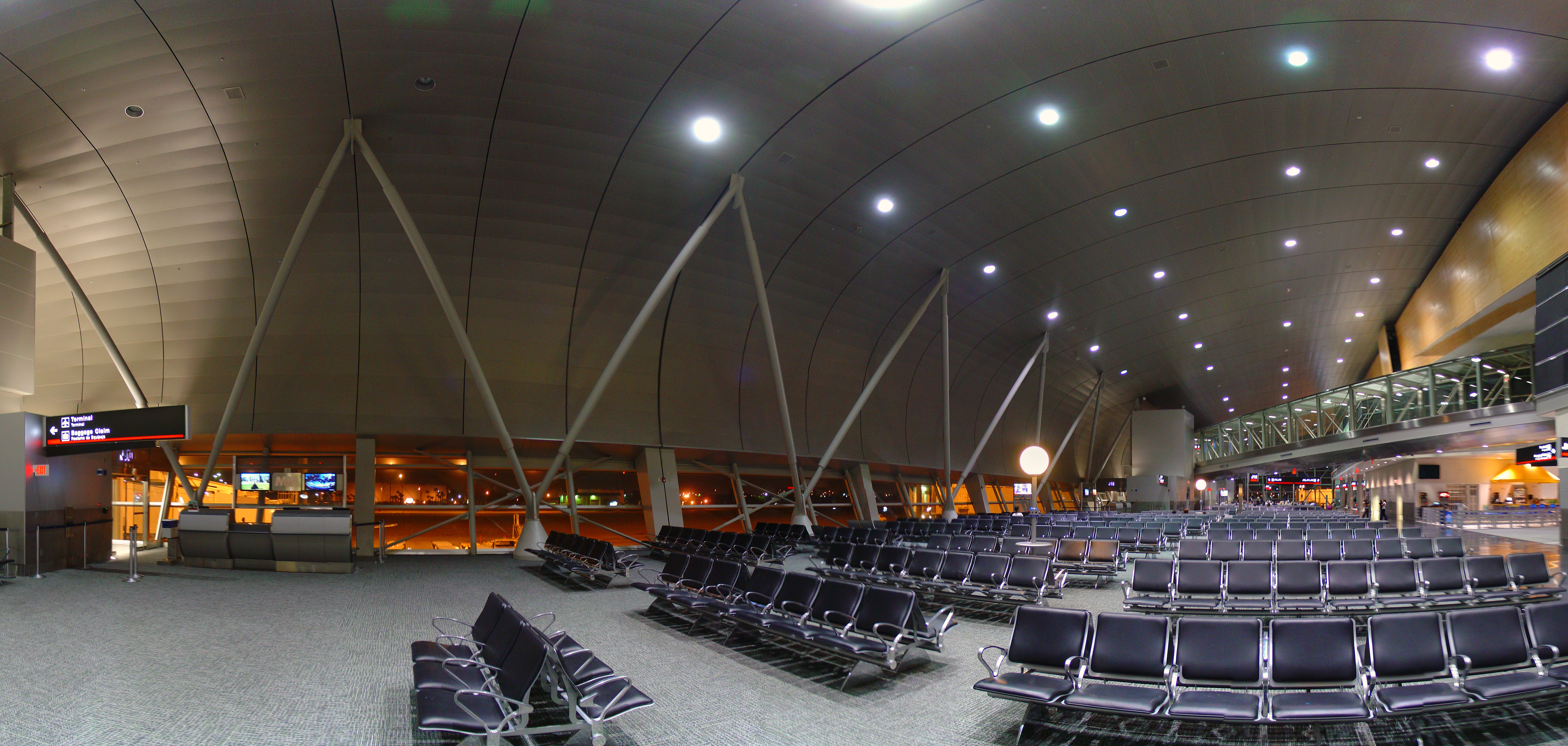
Concourse J in the South Terminal is MIA's newest passenger facility and has one gate that can accommodate the Airbus A380.

American operates three Admirals Clubs and one Flagship Lounge across Concourses D & E. Numerous other lounges exist across the airport as well, including an American Express Centurion Lounge located in Concourse D. The North Terminal (Concourse D) is for the exclusive use of American Airlines. The Central Terminal (Concourses E, F, and G) has varied uses; Concourse E is mainly used by American and its Oneworld partner airlines along with some Caribbean and Latin American airlines, and E's satellite terminal has a gate that can accommodate an Airbus A380. Concourses F and G are used by non-AA domestic and Canadian carriers and flights. The South Terminal (Concourses H and J) is the main non-Oneworld international terminal. Concourse H is largely used by Delta and non-Oneworld international carriers that send narrowbody planes largely from Central and the northern parts of South America, and some widebody flights; and Concourse J is used by most non-Oneworld international carriers that send widebody planes and is the main terminal at MIA for non-Oneworld transcontinental flights. Concourse J also has one gate that can accommodate an A380.

=== Ground transportation ===
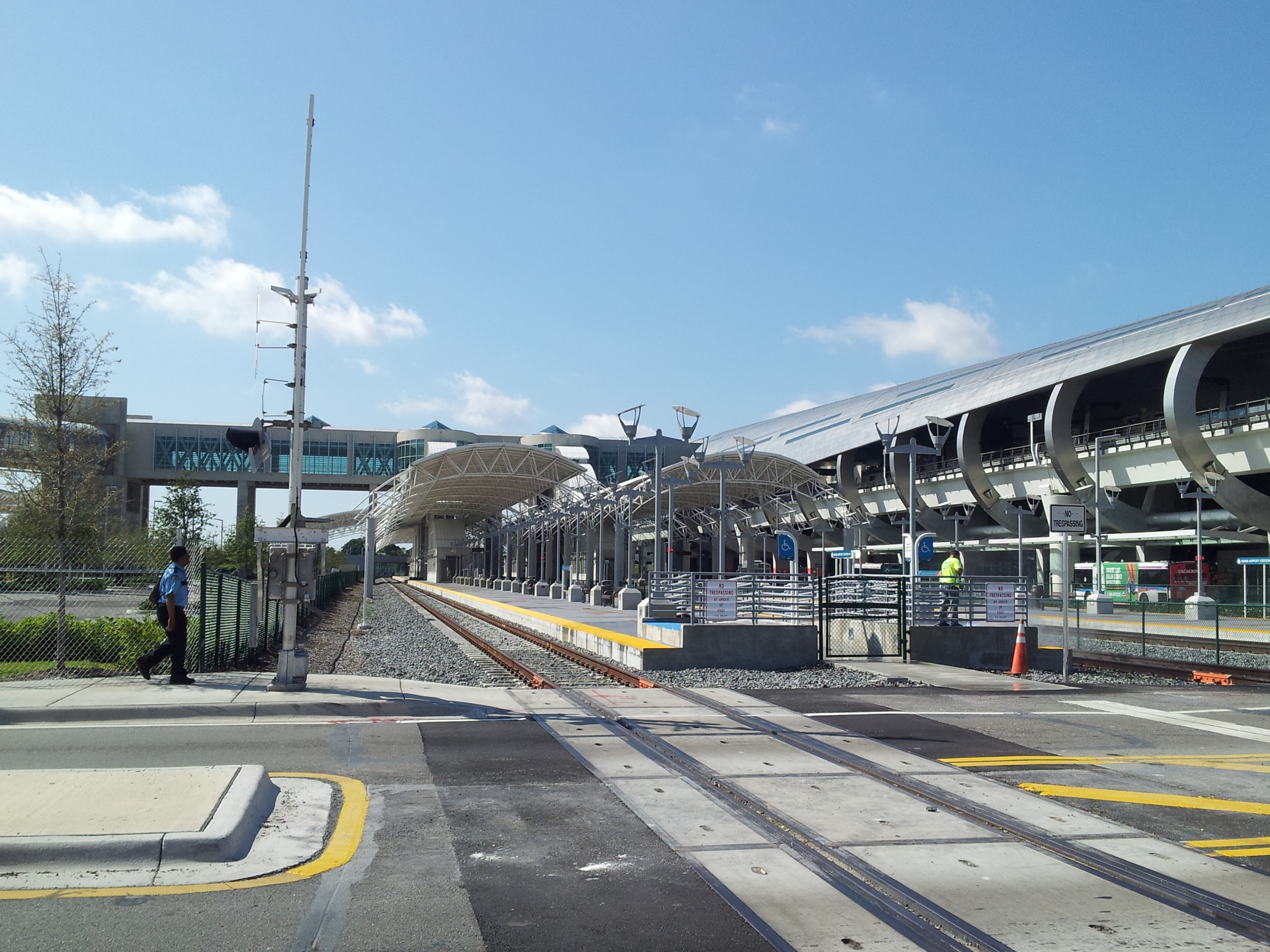
Miami Intermodal Center, a hub for intercity transportation, including Tri-Rail and Miami-Dade Transit, in March 2015

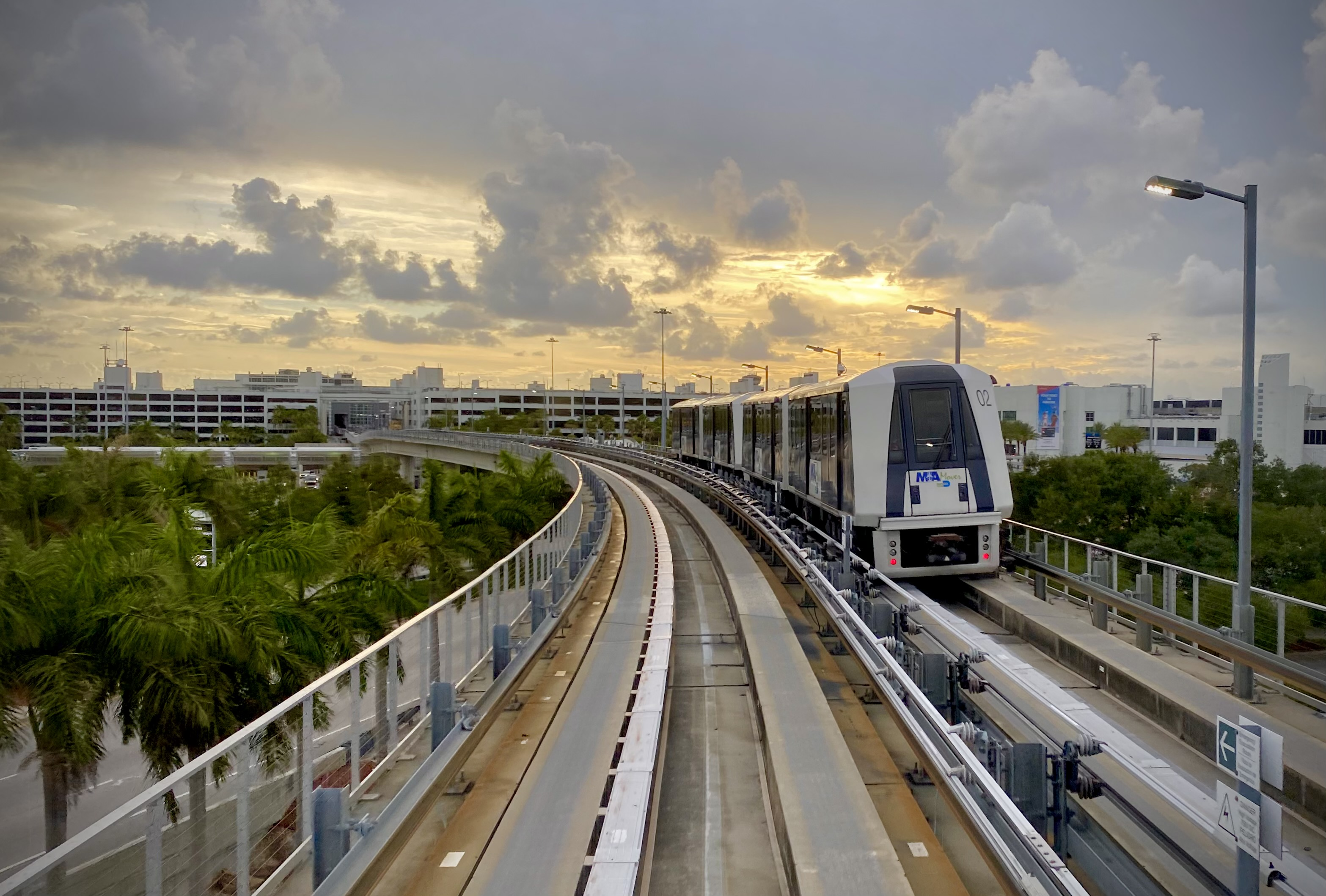
MIA Mover transports landside passengers between the main terminal and the Miami Intermodal Center (MIC) in 2021.

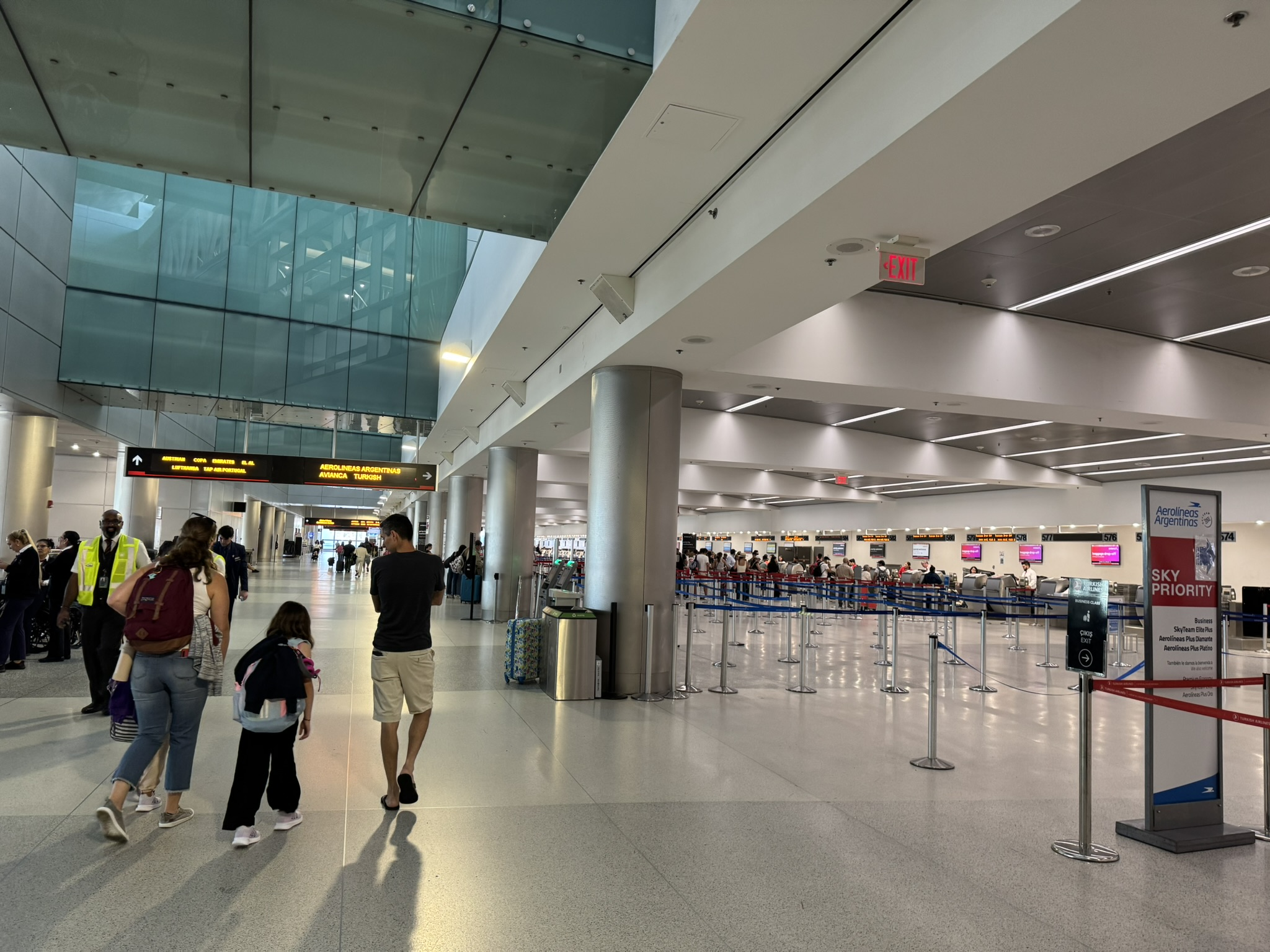
Check-in counters at the South Terminal of the airport.

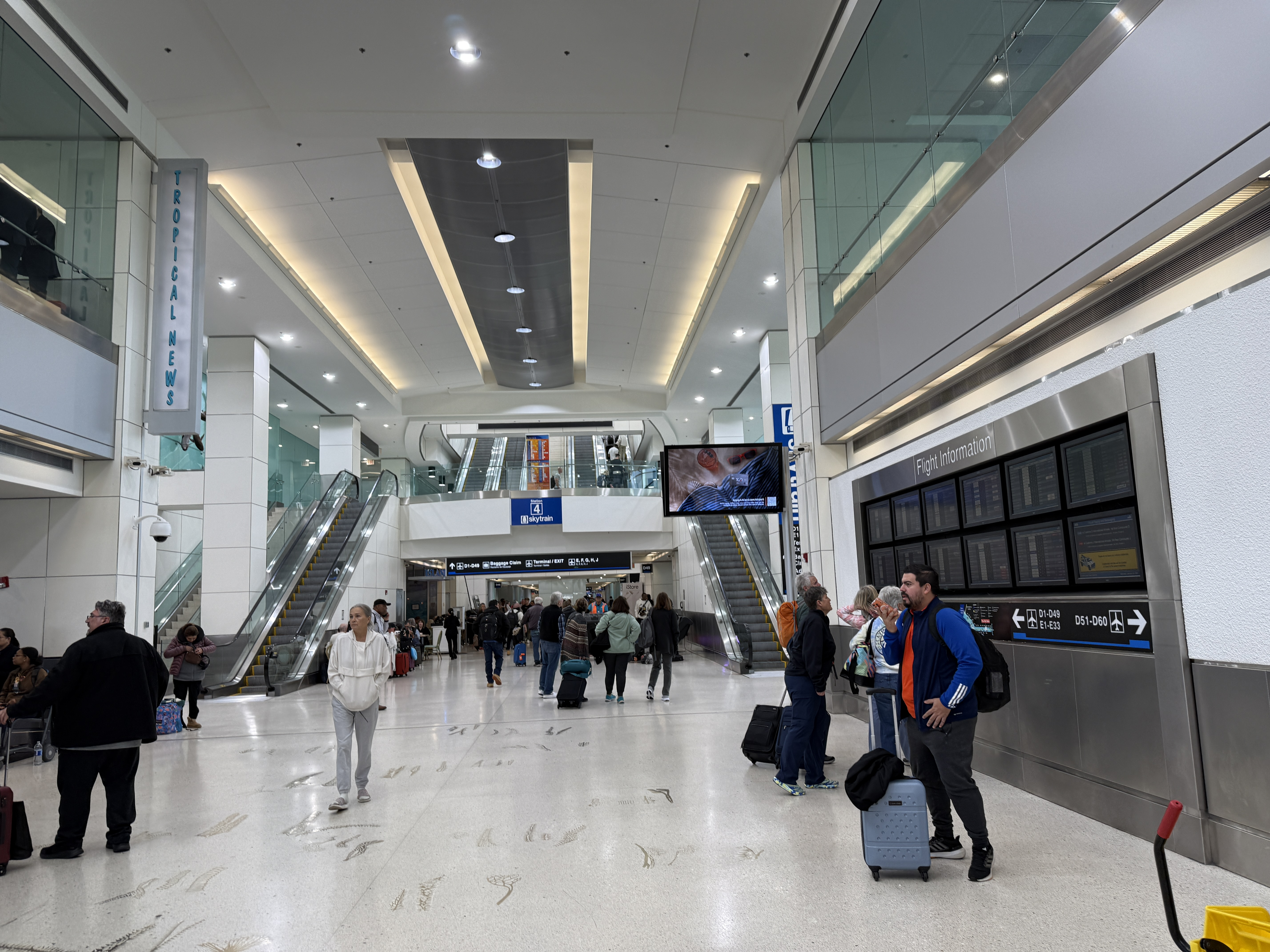
Concourse D of the airport.

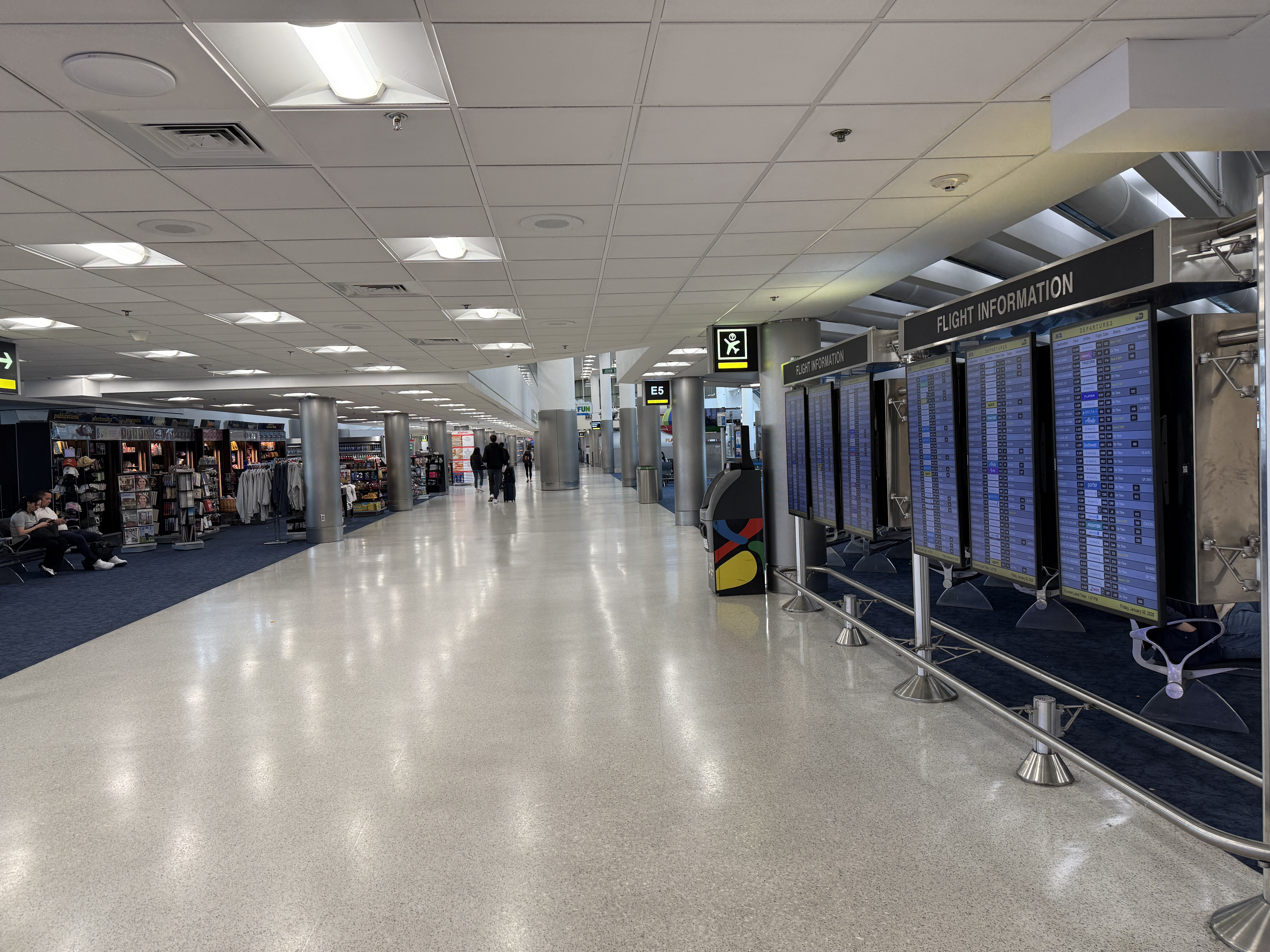
Concourse E of the airport.

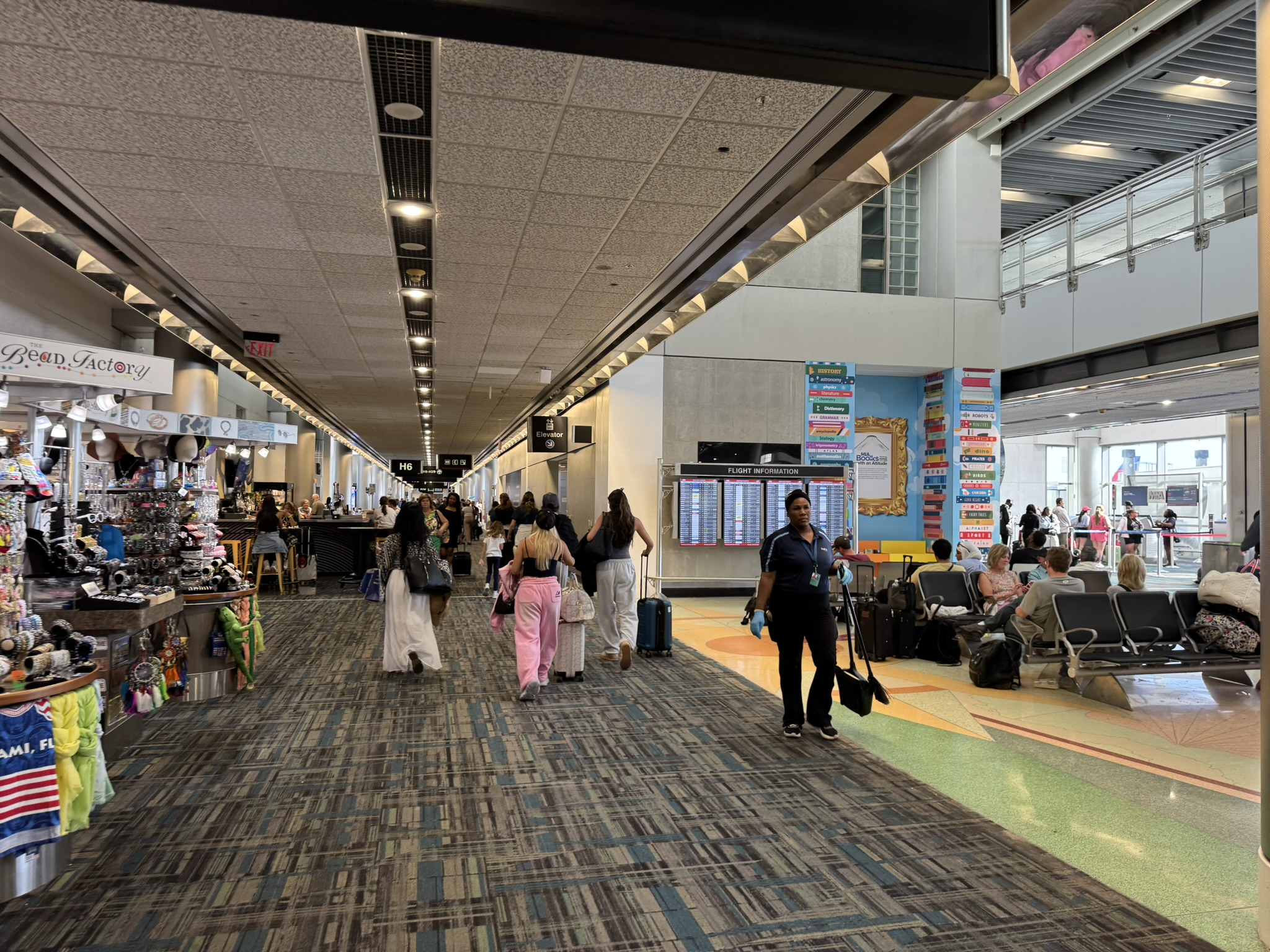
Concourse H of the airport.

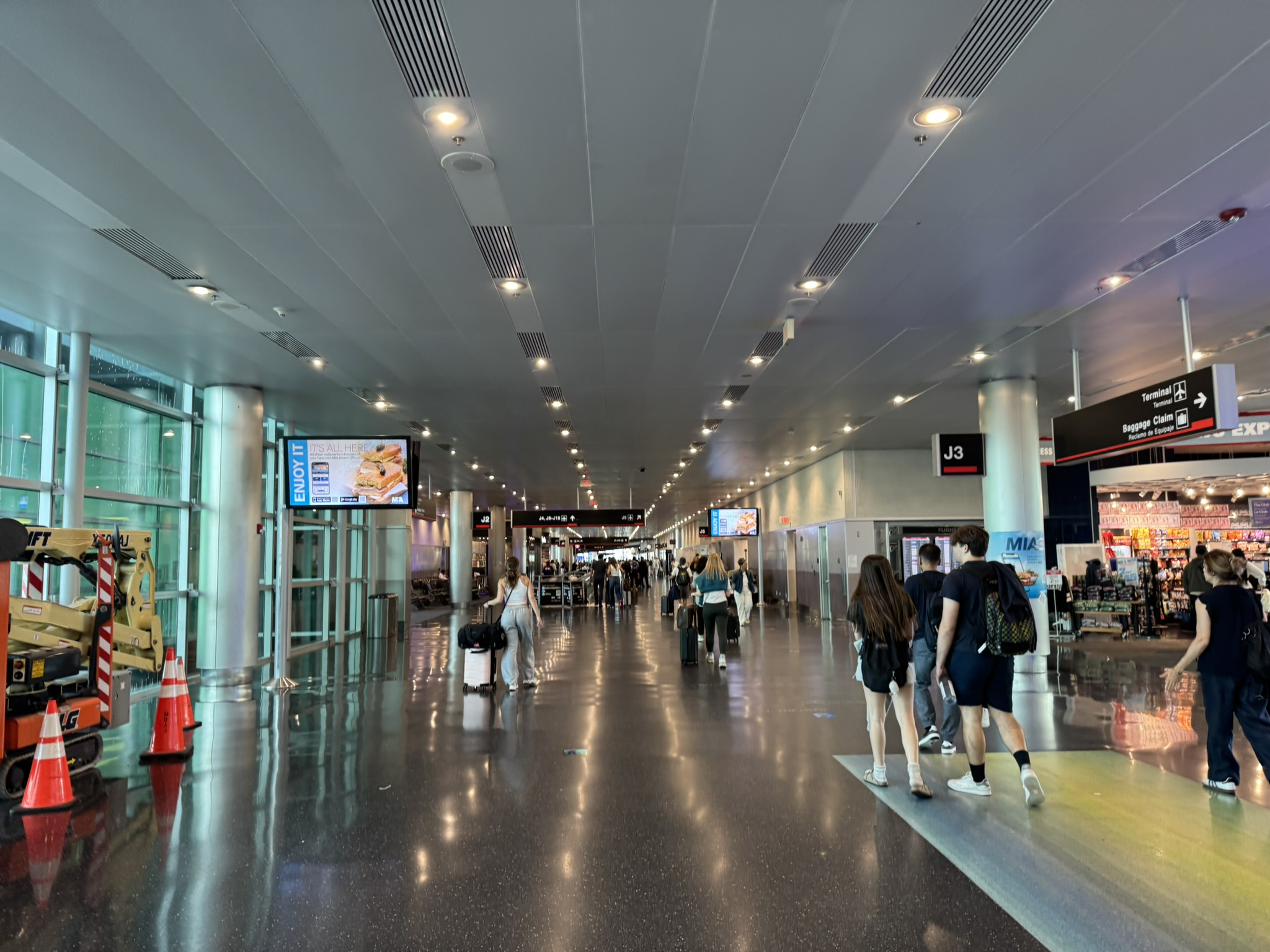
Concourse J of the airport.

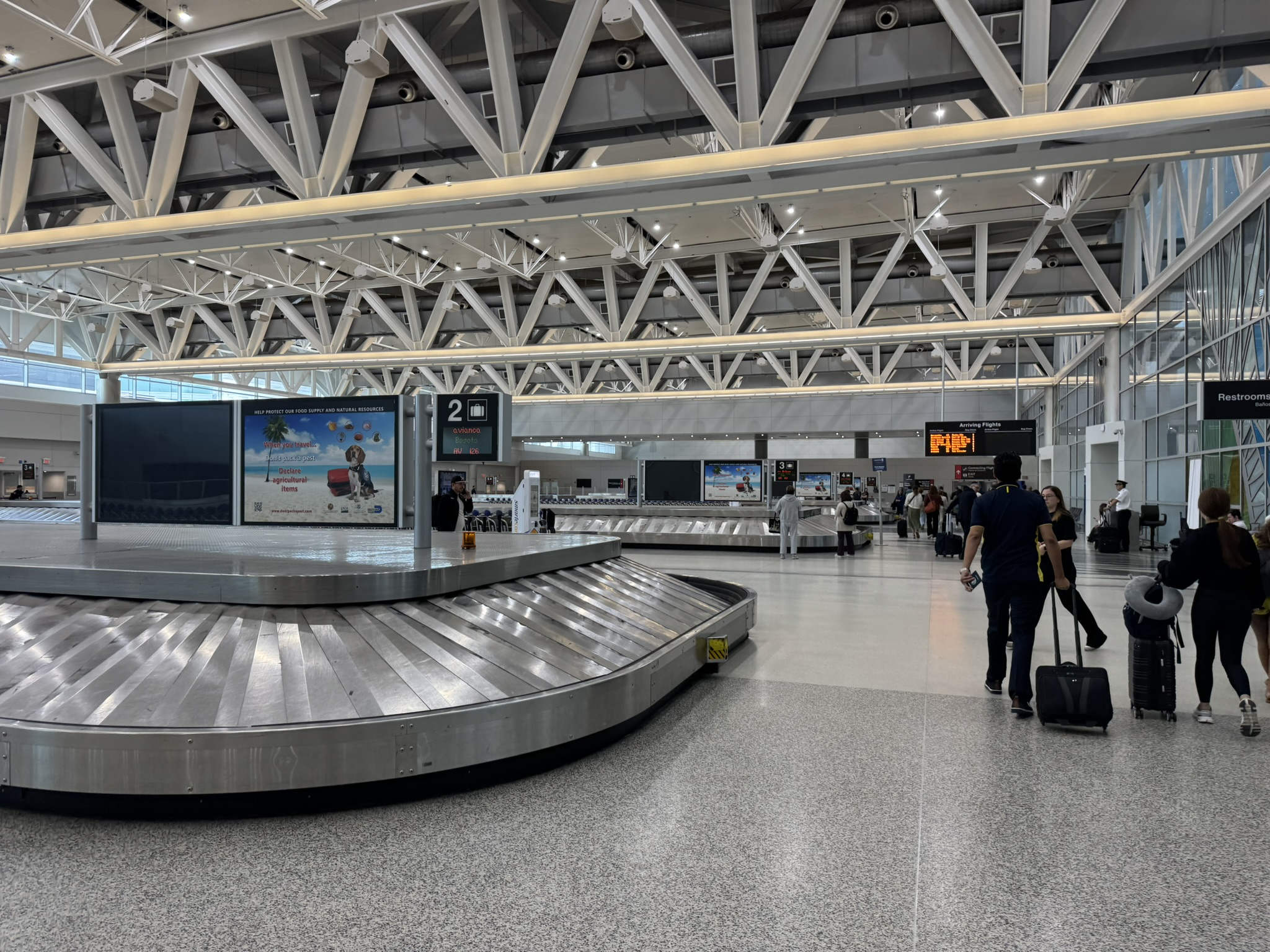
International baggage claim at the airport's South Terminal.

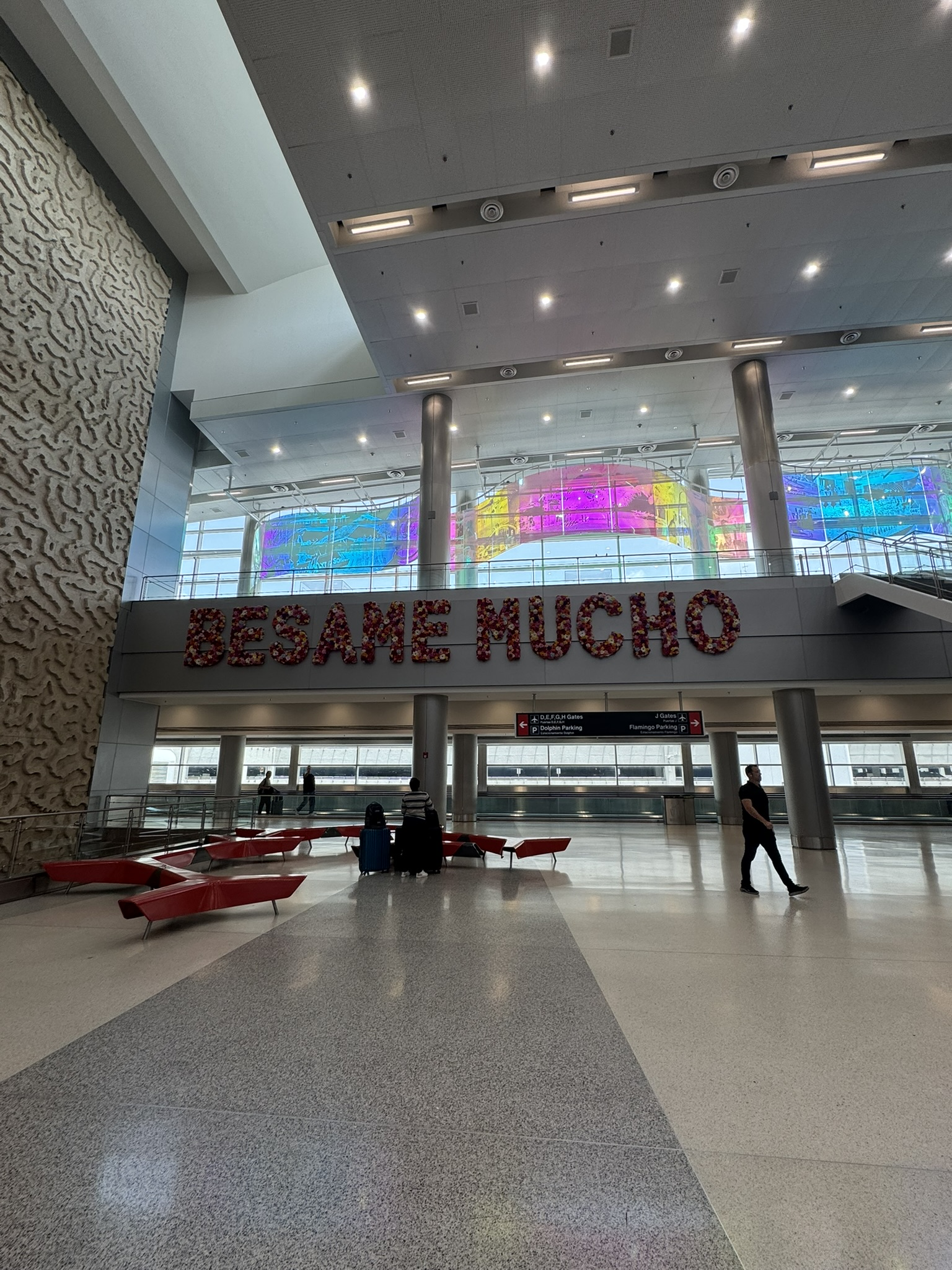
"Bésame Mucho" sign at the international arrivals of the South Terminal of the airport.

Miami International Airport offers the MIA Mover, a free people mover system to transfer passengers between MIA terminals and the Miami Intermodal Center (MIC) that opened to the public on September 9, 2011. The MIC provides direct access from the airport to ground transportation (shuttle/bus/rail) as well as the Rental Car Center. A Metrorail station opened at the MIC on July 28, 2012; a Tri-Rail station followed on April 5, 2015. Plans for Amtrak to operate a station at the MIC were cancelled when it was discovered that the platform built for the service was too short for Amtrak trains. The platform now sits empty and closed, with no trains stopping at it.

The rental car center consolidates airport car rental operations at the MIC.

Miami International Airport has direct public transit service to Miami-Dade Transit's Metrorail and Metrobus networks; Greyhound Bus Lines and to the Tri-Rail commuter rail system. Metrorail operates the Orange Line train from Miami International Airport to destinations such as Downtown, Brickell, Health District, Coconut Grove, Coral Gables, Dadeland, Hialeah, South Miami, and Wynwood. It takes approximately 15 minutes to get from the airport to Downtown.

Miami-Dade Transit operates an Airport Flyer bus that connects MIA directly to South Beach.

MIA is served directly by Tri-Rail, Miami's commuter rail system. The station opened on April 5, 2015. Tri-Rail connects MIA to northern Miami-Dade, Broward, and Palm Beach counties. Tri-Rail directly serves points north such as Boca Raton, Deerfield Beach, Delray Beach, Fort Lauderdale, Hollywood, Pompano Beach and West Palm Beach.

=== Cargo yard ===
MIA has a number of air cargo facilities. The largest cargo complex is located on the west side of the airport, inside the triangle formed by Runways 12/30 and 9/27. Cargo carriers such as LATAM Cargo, Atlas Air, Amerijet International, and DHL operate from this area. The largest privately owned facility is the Centurion Cargo complex in the northeast corner of the airport, with over 51,000 m^{2} (550,000 sq ft) of warehouse space. FedEx and UPS operate their own facilities in the northwest corner of the airport, off of 36th Street. In addition to its large passenger terminal in Concourse D, American Airlines operates a maintenance base to the east of Concourse D, centered around a semicircular hangar originally used by National Airlines which can accommodate three widebody aircraft.

== Airlines and destinations ==
=== Passenger ===
Airlines	Destinations
Aer Lingus	Seasonal: Dublin
Aerolíneas Argentinas	Buenos Aires–Ezeiza, Córdoba (AR)
Aeroméxico	Cancún, Mexico City–Benito Juárez; Seasonal: Guadalajara, Monterrey
Air Canada	Toronto–Pearson, Vancouver
Air Canada Rouge	Montréal–Trudeau, Toronto–Pearson
Air Europa	Madrid
Air France	Paris–Charles de Gaulle, Pointe-à-Pitre
Air Serbia	Belgrade (begins May 20, 2027)
Alaska Airlines	Seattle/Tacoma; Seasonal: Portland (OR)
American Airlines	Antigua, Aruba, Atlanta, Austin, Baltimore, Barbados, Barcelona, Barranquilla, Belize City, Bermuda, Bogotá, Bonaire, Boston, Buenos Aires–Ezeiza, Cali, Camagüey, Cancún, Cap-Haïtien, Caracas, Cartagena, Charleston (SC), Charlotte, Chicago–O'Hare, Cleveland, Curaçao, Dallas/Fort Worth, Denver, Detroit, Fort-de-France, Georgetown–Cheddi Jagan, Grand Cayman, Grenada, Guatemala City, Guayaquil, Hartford, Havana, Holguín, Houston–Intercontinental, Indianapolis, Jacksonville (FL), Kansas City, Kingston–Norman Manley, Knoxville, La Romana, Las Vegas, Liberia (CR), Lima, London–Heathrow, Los Angeles, Louisville, Madrid, Managua, Medellín–JMC, Memphis, Mérida, Mexico City–Benito Juárez, Milan–Malpensa, Minneapolis/St. Paul, Montego Bay, Montréal–Trudeau, Nashville, Nassau, New Orleans, New York–JFK, New York–LaGuardia, Newark, Norfolk, Orlando, Panama City–Tocumen, Philadelphia, Phoenix–Sky Harbor, Pittsburgh, Pointe-à-Pitre, Port-au-Prince (suspended), Port of Spain, Providenciales, Puerto Plata, Punta Cana, Quito, Raleigh/Durham, Richmond, Rio de Janeiro–Galeão, Roatán, St. Croix, St. Kitts, St. Louis, St. Lucia–Hewanorra, St. Maarten, St. Thomas, St. Vincent–Argyle, San Antonio, San Diego, San Francisco, San José (CR), San Juan, San Pedro Sula, San Salvador, Santa Clara, Santiago de Chile, Santiago de Cuba, Santiago de los Caballeros, Santo Domingo–Las Américas, São Paulo–Guarulhos, Seattle/Tacoma, Tampa, Tegucigalpa/Comayagua, Toronto–Pearson, Tulum, Varadero, Washington–National, Wilmington (NC); Seasonal: Birmingham (AL), Eagle/Vail, Grand Rapids, Montevideo, Omaha, Portland (OR), Rome–Fiumicino, Salt Lake City, Savannah
American Eagle	Anguilla, Atlanta, Barcelona (VE) (begins January 15, 2027), Birmingham (AL), Caracas, Cincinnati, Columbus–Glenn, Cozumel, Destin/Fort Walton Beach, Dominica–Douglas-Charles, Fayetteville/Bentonville, Freeport, Gainesville, George Town, Governor’s Harbour, Greensboro, Greenville/Spartanburg, Jacksonville (FL), Key West, Knoxville, Little Rock, Maracaibo, Marsh Harbour, Monterrey, Nashville, Nassau, North Eleuthera, Ocho Rios, Oklahoma City, Pensacola, Sarasota, Savannah, South Bimini, South Caicos, Tallahassee, Tampa, Tortola, Tulsa, Wilmington (NC); Seasonal: Albany, Asheville, Baltimore, Buffalo, Cedar Rapids/Iowa City, Charleston (SC), Chattanooga, Cleveland, Columbia (SC), Des Moines, Harrisburg, Houston–Intercontinental, Huntsville, Indianapolis, Jackson (MS), Kansas City, Lexington, Madison, Memphis, Milwaukee, New Orleans, Norfolk, Omaha, Raleigh/Durham, Rochester (NY), St. Louis, San Antonio, Springfield/Branson, Syracuse, White Plains, Wichita
Arajet	Punta Cana, Santo Domingo–Las Américas
Avianca	Barranquilla, Bogotá, Cali, Medellín–JMC; Seasonal: Cartagena
Avianca Costa Rica	Guatemala City, San José (CR)
Avianca Ecuador	Guayaquil (ends November 30 2026)
Avianca El Salvador	Managua, San Salvador
Bahamasair	Nassau, San Salvador (Bahamas)
Boliviana de Aviación	Santa Cruz de la Sierra–Viru Viru
British Airways	London–Heathrow
Caribbean Airlines	Port of Spain
Cayman Airways	Cayman Brac, Grand Cayman
Condor	Frankfurt
Copa Airlines	Panama City–Tocumen
Delta Air Lines	Atlanta, Austin, Boston, Detroit, Havana, Los Angeles, Minneapolis/St. Paul, New York–JFK, New York–LaGuardia, Raleigh/Durham, Salt Lake City, Seattle/Tacoma, Washington–National
El Al	Tel Aviv
Emirates	Bogotá, Dubai–International
Finnair	Seasonal: Helsinki
French Bee	Paris–Orly
Frontier Airlines	Atlanta, Baltimore, Charlotte, Cincinnati, Dallas/Fort Worth, Denver, Detroit, Guatemala City, Houston–Intercontinental, New York–LaGuardia, Philadelphia, Raleigh/Durham, San Juan, Washington–Dulles; Seasonal: Cleveland, San Pedro Sula
Gol Linhas Aéreas	Belém (ends January 31, 2027), Brasília (ends January 31, 2027); Seasonal: Fortaleza, Manaus
Havana Air	Holguín
Iberia	Madrid
Icelandair	Seasonal: Reykjavík–Keflavík
ITA Airways	Rome–Fiumicino
KLM	Amsterdam
LATAM Brasil	São Paulo–Guarulhos; Seasonal: Fortaleza
LATAM Chile	Bogotá, Buenos Aires–Ezeiza, Cancún, Punta Cana, Santiago de Chile
LATAM Colombia	Bogotá
LATAM Ecuador	Quito
LATAM Perú	Lima
Level	Barcelona
LOT Polish Airlines	Warsaw–Chopin
Lufthansa	Frankfurt; Seasonal: Munich
Porter Airlines	Seasonal: Ottawa, Toronto–Pearson
Qatar Airways	Doha
RED Air	La Romana
Royal Air Maroc	Casablanca
Scandinavian Airlines	Seasonal: Copenhagen, Stockholm–Arlanda
Sky Airline Peru	Lima
Sky High	Punta Cana, Santiago de los Caballeros, Santo Domingo–Las Américas
Southwest Airlines	Austin, Baltimore, Buffalo (begins February 13, 2027), Chicago–Midway, Dallas–Love, Denver, Houston–Hobby, Las Vegas (begins March 11, 2027), Nashville, Orlando, St. Louis; Seasonal: Columbus–Glenn, Indianapolis, Kansas City, Louisville (begins March 13, 2027), Milwaukee, Omaha, Pittsburgh
Sun Country Airlines	Seasonal: Minneapolis/St. Paul
Sunrise Airways	Cap-Haïtien
Surinam Airways	Georgetown–Cheddi Jagan, Paramaribo; Seasonal: Curaçao
Swiss International Air Lines	Zurich
TAP Air Portugal	Lisbon
Turkish Airlines	Istanbul
United Airlines	Chicago–O'Hare, Denver, Houston–Intercontinental, Newark, San Francisco, Washington–Dulles; Seasonal: Cleveland (resumes December 3, 2026)
Virgin Atlantic	London–Heathrow
Viva	Mérida, Monterrey
Volaris	Guadalajara, Mexico City–Benito Juárez
Volaris Costa Rica	San José (CR)
Volaris El Salvador	San José (CR), San Pedro Sula, San Salvador
World Atlantic Airlines	Curaçao, Havana, Holguín

=== Cargo ===
Airlines	Destinations	Refs
21 Air	Bogotá, Panama City–Tocumen	
ABX Air	Bogotá, Cincinnati, Georgetown–Cheddi Jagan, Panama City–Tocumen, Port of Spain	
AerCaribe	Bogotá	
Air ACT	New York–JFK	
Air Canada Cargo	Atlanta, Bogotá, Lima, Quito, Toronto–Pearson	
Aloha Air Cargo	Barbados, Georgetown–Cheddi Jagan, Honolulu, Lima, Santo Domingo–Las Américas	
Amazon Air	Austin, Baltimore, Chicago/Rockford, Cincinnati, Fort Worth/Alliance, Houston–Intercontinental, Ontario	
Amerijet International	Antigua, Aruba, Barbados, Belize City, Brussels, Cancún, Georgetown–Cheddi Jagan, Grenada, Kingston–Norman Manley, Managua, Medellín–JMC, Mexico City–AIFA, Panama City–Tocumen, Paramaribo, Port-au-Prince (Suspended), Port of Spain, St. Kitts, St. Lucia–Hewanorra, St. Maarten, St. Vincent–Argyle, San Juan, San Pedro Sula, San Salvador, Santiago de los Caballeros, Santo Domingo–Las Américas,	
Atlas Air	Amsterdam, Anchorage, Bogotá, Buenos Aires–Ezeiza, Campinas, Liège, Lima, Manaus, Memphis, Mexico City–AIFA, New York–JFK, Quito, Santiago de Chile, São Paulo–Guarulhos, Zaragoza	
Avianca Cargo	Amsterdam, Asuncion, Barranquilla, Bogotá, Buenos Aires–Ezeiza, Cali, Curitiba, Lima, Manaus, Medellín–JMC, Panama City–Tocumen, Quito, San José (CR), San Salvador, Santo Domingo–Las Américas	
Avianca Cargo México	Bogotá, Guatemala City, Medellín–JMC, Mérida, Mexico City–AIFA, San José (CR)	
Cargojet Airways	Bogotá, Campinas, Cincinnati, Guatemala City, Hamilton (ON), Lima, Panama City–Tocumen, San José (CR), San Pedro Sula, Santo Domingo–Las Américas	
Cargolux	Houston–Intercontinental, Luxembourg, Quito	
Cathay Cargo	Anchorage, Atlanta, Hong Kong, Houston–Intercontinental	
China Airlines Cargo	Anchorage, Los Angeles	
DHL Aviation	Anchorage, Atlanta, Bogotá, Brussels, Buenos Aires–Ezeiza, Campinas, Cincinnati, Guatemala City, Orlando, Panama City–Tocumen, San José (CR), San Pedro Sula, Santiago de Chile	
Emirates SkyCargo	Dubai–Al Maktoum, Quito	
Ethiopian Cargo	Addis Ababa, Bogotá, Brussels, Liège, Zaragoza	
FedEx Express	Bogotá, Buenos Aires–Ezeiza, Guatemala City, Indianapolis, La Aurora, Medellín–JMC, Memphis, Quito, San Pedro Sula, Santiago de Chile,	
FedEx Feeder	Freeport, Guatemala City, Kingston–Norman Manley, Mérida, Nassau, San Pedro Sula, San Salvador	
IBC Airways	Cap–Haïtien, Freeport, Grand Cayman, Havana, Kingston–Norman Manley, Montego Bay, Nassau, Port-au-Prince, Providenciales, Santiago de los Caballeros, Varadero	
Kalitta Air	Anchorage, Buenos Aires–Ezeiza, Campinas, Cincinnati	
KLM Cargo operated by Martinair	Amsterdam, Bogotá, Campinas	
Korean Air Cargo	Anchorage, New York–JFK	
LATAM Cargo Brasil	Asunción, Belo Horizonte–Confins, Cabo Frio, Campinas, Curitiba, Manaus, Panama City–Tocumen, Porto Alegre, Recife, Rio de Janeiro–Galeão, Salvador da Bahia, São José dos Campos, São Paulo–Guarulhos, Vitória	
LATAM Cargo Chile	Amsterdam, Bogotá, Buenos Aires–Ezeiza, Campinas, Ciudad del Este, Guatemala City, Lima, Montevideo, Santiago de Chile	
LATAM Cargo Colombia	Asunción, Barranquilla, Bogotá, Cali, Campinas, Florianópolis, Guatemala City, Huntsville, Lima, Manaus, Panama City–Tocumen, Quito, Santiago de Chile, Zaragoza	
Mas Air	Guadalajara, Los Angeles, Mexico City–AIFA, Panama City–Tocumen	
National Airlines	Anchorage	
Northern Air Cargo	Barbados, Georgetown–Cheddi Jagan, Kingston–Norman Manley, Lima, Paramaribo, Port of Spain, San Juan	
Qatar Airways Cargo	Doha, Liège, Quito	
Silk Way West Airlines	Baku, Luxembourg, Quito	
Sky High Cargo	Havana	
Transportes Aéreos Bolivianos	Santa Cruz de la Sierra–Viru Viru	
Turkish Cargo	Bogotá, Houston–Intercontinental, Istanbul, Maastricht/Aachen, Madrid, São Paulo–Guarulhos	
UPS Airlines	Atlanta, Bogotá, Campinas, Dallas/Fort Worth, Fort Lauderdale, Guatemala City, Guayaquil, Jacksonville (FL), Louisville, Managua, Ontario, Orlando, Panama City–Tocumen, Philadelphia, Quito, San Antonio, San José (CR), Santo Domingo–Las Américas, Seasonal: Tampa	
WestJet Cargo	Toronto–Pearson	
XCargo	Kingston–Norman Manley	

== Statistics ==
=== Top destinations ===
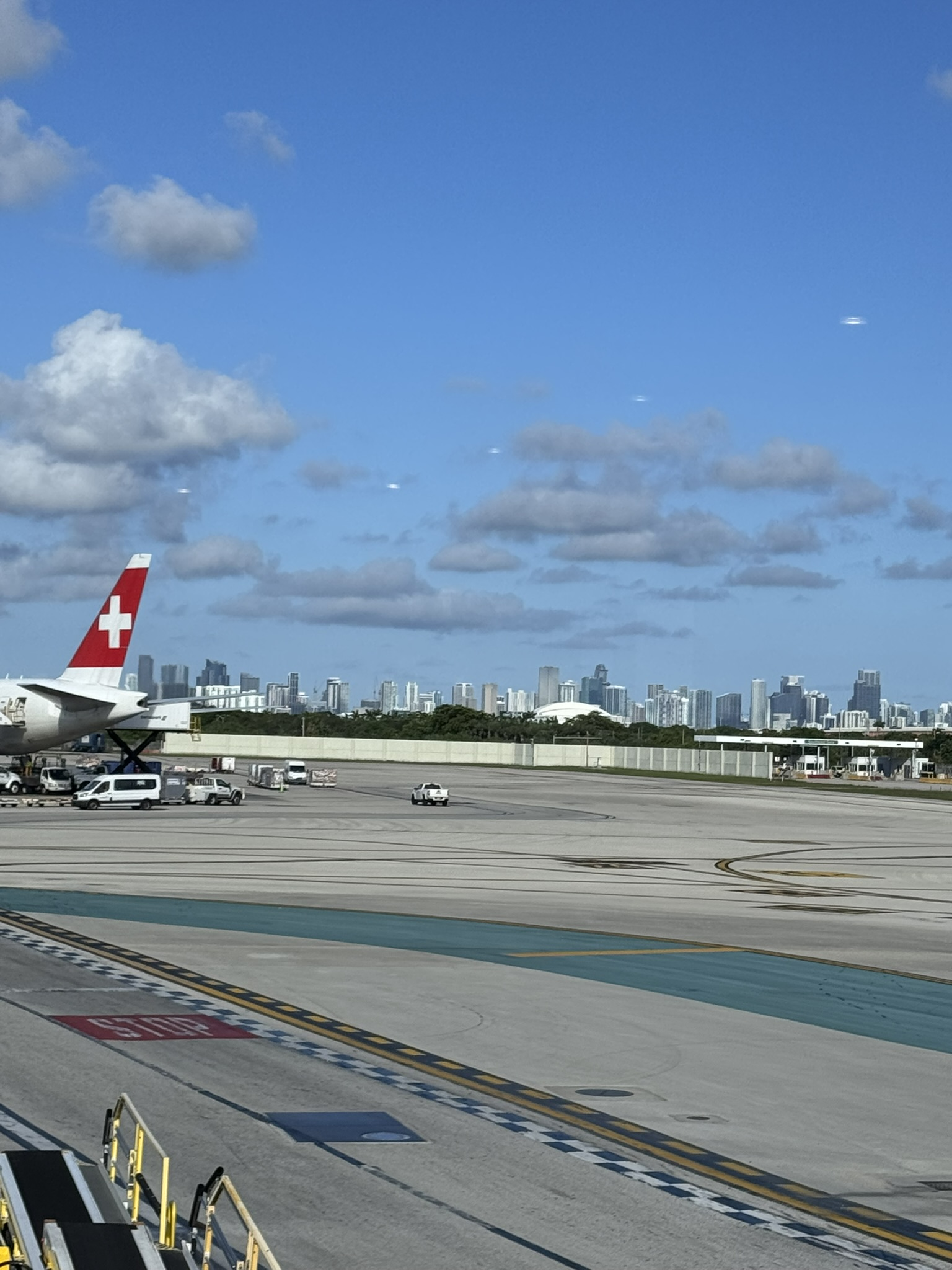
Miami skyline seen from the airport..

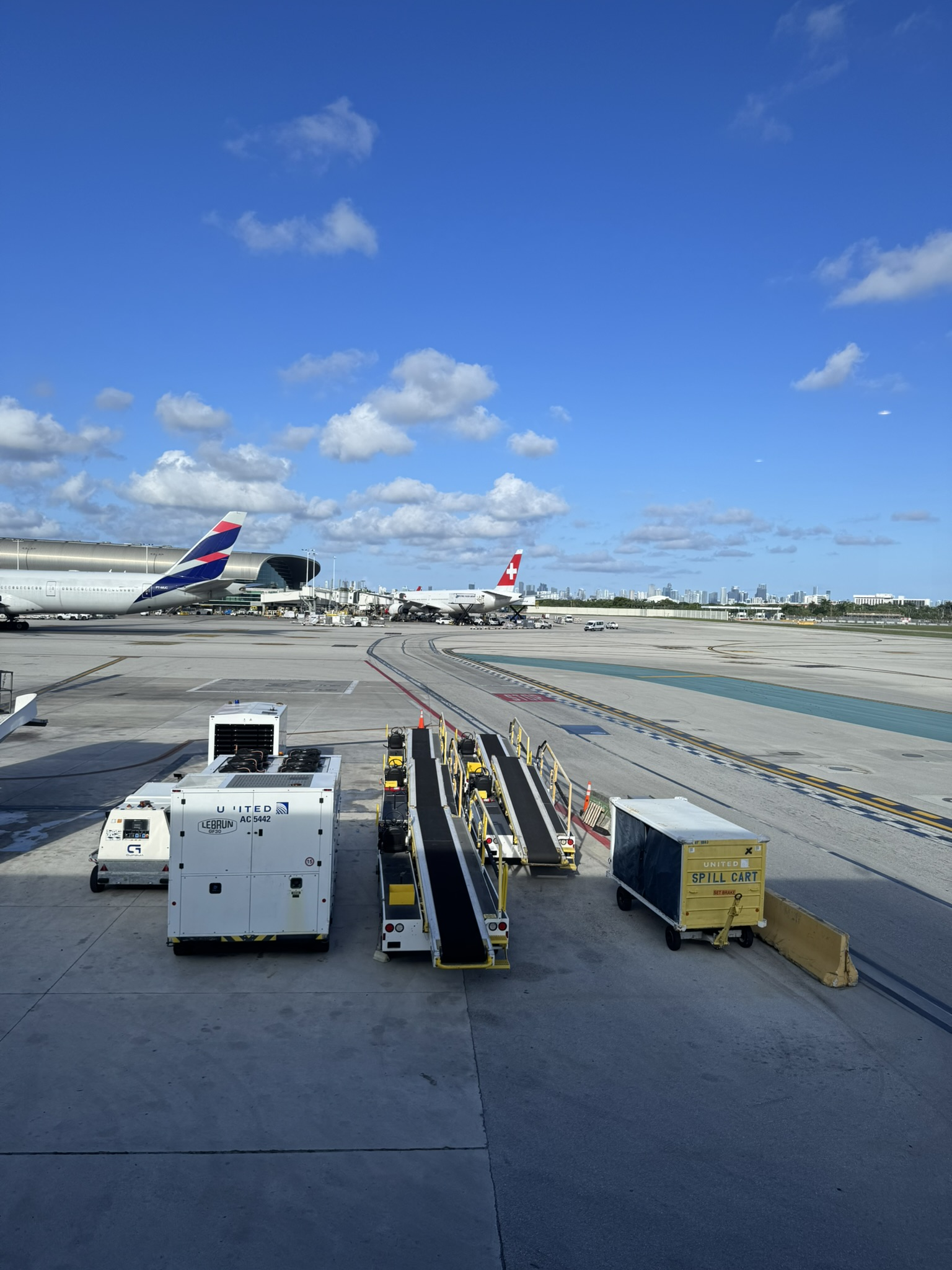
Planes in Concourse J of the airport.

Busiest domestic routes from MIA (September 2025 – August 2026)
Rank	City	Passengers	Carriers
1	Atlanta, Georgia	951,604	American, Delta, Frontier, Spirit
2	New York–LaGuardia, New York	894,410	American, Delta, Frontier, Spirit
3	Dallas/Fort Worth, Texas	757,790	American, Frontier, Spirit
4	New York–JFK, New York	661,516	American, Delta, Frontier, JetBlue
5	Chicago–O'Hare, Illinois	657,175	American, Spirit, United
6	Newark, New Jersey	569,466	American, Spirit, United
7	Charlotte, North Carolina	555,357	American, Frontier, Spirit
8	Washington–National, D.C.	522,194	American, Delta
9	Los Angeles, California	521,080	American, Delta
10	Boston, Massachusetts	492,696	American, Delta, JetBlue, Spirit

Busiest international routes from MIA (September 2025 – August 2026)
Rank	Airport	Passengers	Carriers
1	London–Heathrow, United Kingdom	1,040,264	American, British Airways, Virgin Atlantic
2	Bogotá, Colombia	960,868	American, Avianca, Emirates, LATAM Colombia
3	Buenos Aires–Ezeiza, Argentina	879,625	Aerolíneas Argentinas, American, LATAM Airlines
4	São Paulo–Guarulhos, Brazil	869,921	American, LATAM Brasil
5	Panama City–Tocumen, Panama	838,465	American, Copa Airlines
6	Lima, Peru	839,704	American, LATAM Peru, Sky Airline Peru
7	Madrid, Spain	720,863	Air Europa, American, Iberia
8	Mexico City, Mexico	697,850	Aeroméxico, American, Volaris
9	Santo Domingo, Dominican Republic	614,085	American, Arajet
10	Punta Cana, Dominican Republic	513,975	American, Arajet, Frontier, Lan Airlines

=== Airline market share ===
Carrier shares (September 2025 – August 2026)
1. American, 32,873,393 (62.7%)
2. Delta, 3,614,294 (6.90%)
3. United, 1,931,642 (3.70%)
4. Frontier, 1,465,240 (2.80%)
5. Southwest, 1,409,739 (2.70%)
6. Other, 11,100,000 (21.2%)

Top airlines at MIA (September 2025 – August 2026)
Rank	Airline	Passengers	Share
1	American Airlines	32,873,393	62.7%
2	Delta Air Lines	3,614,294	6.9%
3	United Airlines	1,931,642	3.7%
4	Frontier Airlines	1,465,240	2.8%
5	Southwest Airlines	1,409,739	2.7%
—	Other Airlines	11,100,000	21.2%

=== Annual traffic ===
Annual passenger traffic (enplaned + deplaned) at MIA, 2000 through present
Year	Passengers	Year	Passengers	Year	Passengers
2000	33,621,273	2010	▲35,698,025	2020	▼18,663,858
2001	▼31,668,450	2011	▲38,314,389	2021	▲37,302,456
2002	▼30,060,241	2012	▲39,467,444	2022	▲50,684,396
2003	▼29,595,618	2013	▲40,562,948	2023	▲52,340,934
2004	▲30,165,197	2014	▲40,941,879	2024	▲55,926,566
2005	▲31,008,453	2015	▲44,350,247	2025	▼55,314,661
2006	▲32,553,974	2016	▲44,584,603		
2007	▲33,740,416	2017	▼44,071,313		
2008	▲34,063,531	2018	▲45,044,312		
2009	▼33,886,025	2019	▲45,924,466		

== Accidents and incidents ==
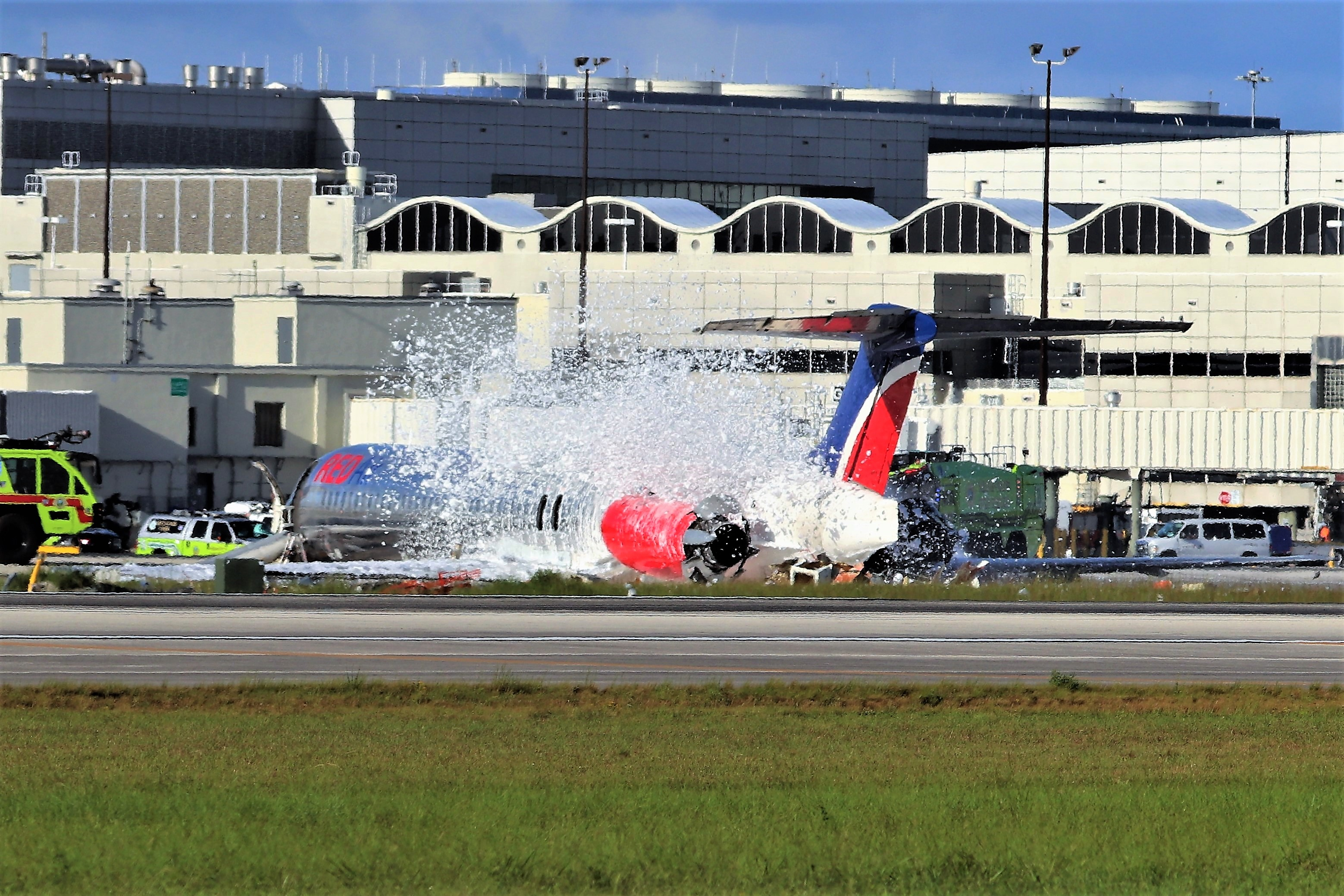
The aftermath of RED Air Flight 203 in June 2022

- On January 22, 1952, an Aerodex Lockheed Model 18 Lodestar on a test flight crashed after takeoff due to engine failure; all 5 occupants were killed.
- On August 4, 1952, a Curtiss C-46 Commando on a ferry flight crashed on approach to MIA because of the failure of the elevator control system; all 4 occupants died.
- On March 25, 1958, Braniff International Airways Flight 971, a Douglas DC-7 crashed 5 km (3.1 mi) WNW of MIA after attempting to return to the airport because of an engine fire crashing into an open marsh; 9 passengers out of 24 on board were killed.
- On October 2, 1959, a Vickers Viscount of Cubana de Aviación was hijacked on a flight from Havana to Antonio Maceo Airport, Santiago by three men demanding to be taken to the United States. The aircraft landed at Miami International Airport.
- On February 12, 1963, Northwest Airlines Flight 705, a Boeing 720, crashed into the Everglades while en route from Miami to Portland, Oregon, via Chicago O'Hare, Spokane, and Seattle. All 43 passengers and crew died.
- On February 13, 1965, an Aerolíneas de El Salvador (AESA) Curtiss C-46 Commando, a cargo flight, had an engine failure shortly after takeoff and crashed into an automobile junkyard, killing both occupants.
- On March 5, 1965, a Fruehaf Inc. Lockheed Model 18 Lodestar nosed down after takeoff due to elevator trim tab problems, and both occupants were killed.
- On June 23, 1969, a Dominicana de Aviación Aviation Traders Carvair, a modified DC-4, en route to Santo Domingo was circling back to Miami International Airport with an engine fire when it crashed into buildings 1 mile (1.6 km) short of Runway 27. All 4 crewmembers aboard the Carvair and 6 on the ground were killed.
- On April 14, 1970, an Ecuatoriana de Aviacion Douglas DC-7, a cargo flight, crashed after takeoff from MIA beyond the runway and slid 890 feet (270 m) before striking a concrete abutment; both occupants were killed.
- On December 29, 1972, Eastern Air Lines Flight 401, a Lockheed L-1011, crashed into the Everglades. The plane had left JFK International Airport in New York City bound for Miami. There were 101 fatalities out of the 176 passengers and crew on board. (This accident is the subject of the movie The Ghost of Flight 401.)
- On June 21, 1973, a Warnaco Inc. Douglas DC-7, a cargo flight, crashed into the Everglades six minutes after takeoff in heavy rain, wind, and lightning. All three occupants died.
- On December 15, 1973, a Lockheed L-1049 Super Constellation operated by Aircraft Pool Leasing Corp, a cargo flight, crashed 1.3 miles (2.1 km) E of MIA because of over-rotation of the aircraft causing a stall, crashing into a parking lot and several homes; all three occupants were killed, along with six on the ground.
- On September 27, 1975, a Canadair CL-44 operated by Aerotransportes Entre Rios (AER), crashed after takeoff because of an external makeshift flight control lock on the right elevator, 4 crew and 2 passengers of the 10 on board died.
- On January 15, 1977, a Douglas DC-3, registered as N73KW of Air Sunshine crashed shortly after take-off on a domestic scheduled passenger flight to Key West International Airport, Florida. All 33 people on board survived.
- On January 6, 1990, a Grecoair Lockheed JetStar crashed after aborting takeoff and exiting the runway, One occupant of the two on board died.
- On May 11, 1996, ValuJet Airlines Flight 592, a McDonnell Douglas DC-9 crashed into the Everglades 10 minutes after taking off from MIA while en route to Hartsfield-Jackson Atlanta International Airport after a fire broke out in the cargo hold, killing all 110 occupants on board.
- On August 7, 1997, Fine Air Flight 101, a Douglas DC-8 cargo plane, crashed onto NW 72nd Avenue less than a mile (1.6 km) from the airport. All four occupants on board and one person on the ground were killed.
- On November 20, 2000, American Airlines Flight 1291, an Airbus A300 en route to Port-au-Prince, Haiti, returned to Miami following a cabin depressurization. During the evacuation one of the emergency exit doors explosively opened, killing a flight attendant.
- On July 1, 2002, two America West Airlines pilots operating Flight 556 to Phoenix–Sky Harbor were ordered back to the gate by air traffic control before takeoff after security agents notified supervisors that the men smelled of alcohol and became belligerent when they were told they were not allowed to take an open cup of coffee through the security checkpoint. Breathalyzer tests conducted after their removal from the aircraft revealed that both men had blood alcohol content in excess of the legal limit for operating a vehicle in Florida, and they were arrested by police. Investigators found that the men had been drinking at a local bar until 4:40 am, roughly six hours before the flight was scheduled to depart. They were fired by the airline the next day, later stripped of their pilot certificates, and convicted in 2005 of operating an aircraft while drunk.
- On December 7, 2005, passenger Rigoberto Alpizar was killed by federal air marshals after frantically exiting an American Airlines flight to Orlando during boarding with a backpack strapped to his chest. The air marshals, who said they had heard Alpizar declare he had a bomb, confronted him in the jetway and shot him after he ignored their commands to stop moving and reached into the backpack. This was the first case of federal air marshals opening fire on a suspect after the September 11 attacks.
- On September 15, 2015, Qatar Airways Flight 778 to Doha overran Runway 9 during takeoff and collided with the approach lights for Runway 27. The collision, which went unnoticed during the 13.5-hour flight, tore an 18-inch (46 cm) tear in the pressure vessel of the Boeing 777-300ER aircraft just behind the rear cargo door. The crew had been confused by a printout from an onboard computer and erroneously began takeoff on Runway 9 at the intersection of Taxiway T1 rather than at the end of the runway, which trimmed roughly 1,370 m (4,490 ft) from the length of the runway available for takeoff.
- On June 21, 2022, RED Air Flight 203, a McDonnell Douglas MD-82 on a flight from Las Américas International Airport with 130 passengers and 10 crew, skidded off Runway 9 on landing and collided with a small glideslope equipment building, starting a fire in the right wing which was rapidly extinguished by firefighters. There were no fatalities, while 4 passengers sustained minor injuries. Crew and passengers reported the aircraft "shaking violently" after a seemingly routine landing, and skid marks on the runway showed that the left main landing gear had shimmied heavily before turning 90° outboard and collapsing. Airline records indicated that the left main landing gear shimmy damper had a history of hydraulic fluid leaks but had passed recent maintenance checks. The accident was attributed to ineffective shimmy dampening of the left main landing gear, but the reason for the poor dampening could not be verified, as damage from the crash "precluded evaluation of whether the damper was properly serviced."
- On January 18, 2024, Atlas Air Flight 095, a cargo Boeing 747-87UF registered as N859GT, en route to San Juan, experienced an engine fire shortly after takeoff from Miami International Airport. The aircraft safely returned to the airport and made an emergency landing within 15 minutes of takeoff.
- On September 6, 2026, 21 Air Flight 7598, an Amazon Air Boeing 767-300ERF, operated by 21 Air, overran Runway 30 on landing. The plane struck multiple vehicles and over 60 units responded to the accident. 5 people died and another 5 were injured, including both pilots in the aircraft, though it is unclear who was onboard and who was around.

== See also ==
- Miami Executive Airport
- Transportation in South Florida
- List of the busiest airports in the United States
- List of tallest air traffic control towers in the United States
