= Miami-Dade Aviation Department =

The Miami-Dade Aviation Department (MDAD) is an agency of the Miami-Dade County government that manages airports. As of 2021, Ralph Cutié is the director of the agency. The Arts and Cultural Affairs division was created, and is managed by, Yolanda Sanchez until her retirement sometime around 2018. MDAD operates Miami International Airport, a passenger airport, and four general aviation airports. The other airports are Miami-Opa Locka Executive Airport, Miami Executive Airport, Miami Homestead General Aviation Airport, and Dade-Collier Training and Transition Airport. The executive offices are located at Miami International Airport.
