= Cargo Airline Association =

Trade association

The Cargo Airline Association is a trade association among the cargo airline air carriers industry.

== Member airlines ==
- ABX Air
- Air Transport International
- Air Transport Services Group
- Astar Air Cargo
- Atlas Air
- Capital Cargo International Airlines
- FedEx Express
- First Air
- Kalitta Air
- UPS Airlines
