= Airborne Maintenance & Engineering Services =

American aerospace company

Airborne Maintenance & Engineering Services, Inc.
- Type: Wholly owned subsidiary
- Industry: Aerospace Aircraft MRO
- Founded: 2009; 17 years ago
- Headquarters: United States of America, Wilmington, Ohio
- Key people: Bill Collins (President); Chris Brown (Interim General Manager, Wilmington); Mark Easton (General Manager, Tampa); Pete Morelli (Vice President of Operations, Tampa)
- Products: Aircraft Maintenance, Repair and Overhaul
- Parent: Air Transport Services Group
- Website: http://airbornemx.com/

Airborne Maintenance & Engineering Services (Airborne) is an MRO based in Wilmington, Ohio, Ohio, USA at the Airborne Airpark (ILN) and Tampa International Airport (TPA). They provide aircraft maintenance, repair, and overhaul services including Heavy Maintenance, Line Maintenance, Component Repair/Overhaul, Engineering, Manufacturing Services, and Material Sales. Airborne holds a Part 145 FAA Repair Station certificate for its Wilmington location that includes 315,000 sq. ft. of hangar space, 100,000 sq. ft. component facility, and 40,000 sq. ft. material sales warehouse. They also operate line maintenance stations at Greater Cincinnati/Northern Kentucky Airport and Miami International Airport. Airborne also offers Boeing 737 Cargo Conversion services through its subsidiary Pemco Conversions. It is part of the Air Transport Services Group (Nasdaq: ATSG).

== History ==
Airborne started operations in 2009, splitting off from ABX Air.

April 26, 2018 Airborne Maintenance & Engineering Services has announced a company brand re-alignment that includes their subsidiary Pemco World Air Services in Tampa, FL. The new brand identity reflects Airborne’s commitment to provide industry best MRO services and a continued focus on their market leading passenger to freighter conversions for the B737 aircraft. The MRO operations in Wilmington and Tampa will be branded as Airborne Maintenance and Engineering Services (AIRBORNE) while the cargo conversion product line will be rebranded under the PEMCO Conversions name.

January 2017, Airborne announced that it acquired Pemco World Air Services located at the Tampa International Airport.

Delta Air Lines agreed to a five-year heavy maintenance contract in October 2015, including three years for work on Boeing 717 aircraft. Airborne leased a new hangar in June 2014. On Feb 17, 2013, Airborne announced a three-year heavy maintenance agreement for 767 checks with DHL.
