= Air transport (disambiguation) =

Air transport usually refers to aviation.

Air transport may also refer to:

- Air Transport Services Group, an American aviation holding company
  - Air Transport International, an American charter airline
- Aero Trasporti Italiani, a defunct Italian airline
