= Wilmington Airport =

Wilmington Airport can refer to:

- Wilmington Airport (Delaware) in New Castle County, Delaware (Philadelphia metropolitan area)
- Wilmington International Airport in Wrightsboro, North Carolina, serving the city of Wilmington, North Carolina
- Airborne Airpark in Wilmington, Ohio
