= Airborne Express =

Express delivery company that merged into DHL (1949–2003)

Airborne ABF dba Airborne Express Airborne Freight Company (ABF) Pacific Air Freight
- Founded: 1949; 77 years ago
- Founders: Philip Gruger; John D. McPherson
- Defunct: August 15, 2003
- Fate: Acquired
- Successor: DHL
- Headquarters: Seattle, Washington
- Key people: Holt W. Webster
- Revenue: $3.3 billion (2002)
- Number of employees: 15,200 full time 7,300 part-time YE2002
- Subsidiaries: ABX Air (1980–2003)

Airborne Express was the trade name, from 1985 onward, for a United States express delivery company sold to DHL in 2003. At the time it was sold, Airborne Express was the number three domestic package express company after FedEx and United Parcel Service.

The Airborne name originated as Airborne Flower Traffic, a California-based air freight forwarder incorporated in 1947, which became Airborne Freight in 1965. Management originated with Pacific Air Freight, a Seattle-based air freight forwarder that took over Airborne Freight in 1968, creating a new Delaware-incorporated Airborne Freight Corporation (ABF).

Following the U.S. air cargo deregulation in 1977, the company expanded from freight forwarding into overnight package delivery and acquired cargo airline Midwest Air Charter in 1980, including the airline's Wilmington, Ohio hub. Airborne became the third-largest domestic package express company behind FedEx and United Parcel Service before being acquired by DHL in 2003.

As of 2026, Airborne's former airline subsidiary, ABX Air, remains in operation, having been spun out at the time of the 2003 merger due to DHL's foreign ownership.

== History ==
=== Airborne Freight of California ===
John D. McPherson and partners incorporated San Francisco-based Airborne Flower Traffic (AFC) in California 23 April 1947. AFC was one of the first five air freight forwarders issued letters of registration in 1948 by the Civil Aeronautics Board (CAB), the now-defunct Federal agency that, at the time, tightly regulated almost all US commercial air transport. As an indirect air carrier, Airborne Flower Traffic fell under the purview of the CAB. AFC changed its name to Airborne Flower and Freight Traffic in 1948 and to Airborne Freight Corporation in 1965, the same year it went public. AFC was the clear number two air freight forwarder (after Emery Air Freight) by tons shipped in the early 1950s. In 1958 it was number two by revenue in the industry after Emery Air Freight. At the time of its merger with Pacific Air Freight, AFC remained number two, but was in financial trouble, in part due to a poorly-programmed computer installation.

=== Pacific Air Freight ===
Philip Gruger started Pacific Air Freight (PAF) 1949; it received its CAB authorization as an air freight forwarder in 1950. Holt W. Webster, a former Northwest Airlines freight employee, joined Gruger in 1951, making it a two-person operation. Its original business was arranging air transport of produce and contractor equipment to Alaska. PAF grew quickly after Webster became president in 1962. In 1965, Airborne's forwarding revenue was $16.3 million (number 2 in the industry), PAF was number 7 at $6.4 million (number 1 was Emery Air Freight at $49.7 million). By 1967, PAF had $23.1 million in revenue vs $25 million for Airborne.

AFC was PAF's main competitor; the Justice Department objected to the 1968 merger on anti-trust grounds, but the CAB approved it on the basis that AFC seemed likely to collapse without the merger. The two companies merged into a new Delaware-incoporated entity, Airborne Freight Corporation (ABF). Holt W. Webster would remain CEO until 1984, seeing the organization through its transition into an integrated package express company. John D. McPherson became a director of the new company and the largest shareholder until close to the end of his life in 1987.

=== Transition to package express company ===
ABF remained the number two air freight forwarder through 1977 US air cargo deregulation. In that year, Emery had $340 million in revenue while in second place was ABF with $150 million. In October 1976, ABF started chartering aircraft from Midwest Air Charter (MAC), a small Ohio-based freight airline best known for flying checks for the United States Federal Reserve Bank.

In the 1970s, passenger airlines started withdrawing freighter aircraft from their fleets, leaving air freight forwarders without the overnight cargo flights that they needed. ABF was thus driven to chartering capacity from MAC. The need for ABF's own freight flights only increased with the advent of Federal Express and 1977 US air cargo deregulation and ABF came to increasingly rely on MAC. In September 1978, MAC bought the airport at Wilmington, Ohio to use as its hub. In December 1978 ABF bought 9.5% of MAC. In 1979, ABF bought its own aircraft for MAC to fly. By year end 1979, MAC had 54 aircraft and was flying to 76 airports and accounted for over half of ABF's shipments. Finally in 1980 ABF bought out MAC entirely. ABF renamed MAC to "Airborne Express."

=== Airborne Express ===
The 1980s saw both the development and rationalization of the US package express business as Federal Express (today's FedEx), expanded and competitors, including ABF, responded to it. In the early 1980s, other than the United States Postal Service (USPS), significant US domestic package express companies included Federal Express, Emery Worldwide, Purolator and ABF. In 1982 United Parcel Service (UPS), which had a ground package delivery business and had traditionally offered a second-day air delivery service, entered the overnight delivery service. Emery bought Purolator in 1987 to reinforce its overnight market share, but the merger was unsuccessful and by 1989 Emery withdrew from small package delivery. ABF ended the 1980s as a third-player survivor after much larger FedEx and UPS.

In 1985, ABF adopted "Airborne Express" as its trade name. In 1989, ABF renamed its airline to ABX Air to reduce the chance of confusion between the carrier and its parent. By 1990, the package express business (outside of USPS) consolidated to Federal Express, UPS and ABF. In December 2000, the company restructured, with Airborne, Inc. becoming a holding company, the former ABF now called Airborne Express, Inc. and ABX Air becoming a holding company subsidiary. In 2003, DHL agreed to buy Airborne for $1.05 billion (over $1.8 billion in 2026 terms), part of a strategy by which DHL would attempt to become a third large domestic US package express company. At the time, respective domestic overnight package delivery shares of Airborne, FedEx and UPS were estimated to be 19%, 46% and 33%. The transaction closed on August 15, and part of the deal included ABX Air being spun out to shareholders due to DHL's foreign ownership.

== Business model ==
In 2002, Airborne, Inc. had annual revenues of $3.3 billion versus FedEx's of $20.6 billion (year ending May) and UPS of $31.3 billion. As a much smaller competitor, the company survived in part by taking a low-cost approach. Some aspects of that model included:

- ABF modified its aircraft itself and performed all its own aircraft maintenance, unlike FedEx or UPS.
- In 1985, ABF developed a custom aircraft freight container that could be loaded through a standard aircraft passenger door, eliminating the need to modify ABF's aircraft with large main-deck cargo doors, saving significant capital expense. The company patented the C-container and continued to use them when it acquired Boeing 767 wide-body aircraft in the late 1990s.
- Focusing on corporate accounts, where it could make pickups of large numbers of packages at once.
- Non-comprehensive service. Airborne did not offer 10:30am deliveries, for instance. Only in 2001 did it offer ground delivery.
- Rely on partners for international deliveries.

== See also ==
- ABX Air
- DHL
- Wilmington Air Park
