= ABX Air =

US cargo airline

ABX Air Airborne Express Midwest Air Charter

- An ABX Air Boeing 767-300F
IATA	ICAO	Call sign
GB	ABX	ABEX
- Founded: April 1980; 46 years ago
- AOC #: ABXA001A
- Hubs: Cincinnati/Northern Kentucky International Airport; Miami International Airport
- Fleet size: 33
- Parent company: Air Transport Services Group, Inc. Airborne; Airborne Freight Corporation
- Headquarters: Wilmington Air Park; Clinton County, Ohio, U.S.
- Key people: John Maloney (President); Brant Venice (Chief Operating Officer; Bob Boja (Vice President of Flight Operations); Rob Davis (Vice President, Aircraft Maintenance)
- Website: www.abxair.com

ABX Air, Inc. is an American cargo airline headquartered at Wilmington Air Park near Wilmington, Ohio. ABX Air operates scheduled, ad hoc charter and ACMI (Aircraft, Crew, Maintenance and Insurance) freight services. It also provides flight support services and training. ABX Air is owned by Air Transport Services Group.

The airline was incorporated as Midwest Air Charter (MAC) in 1970. MAC was originally best known for flying cancelled checks for banks, including, starting in 1972, the United States Federal Reserve Bank. Airborne Freight Corporation (ABF) started to charter MAC aircraft in 1976. In 1978, MAC took control of the airport at Wilmington, Ohio. In 1980, ABF bought MAC and its name to Airborne Express as part of transitioning to becoming an integrated package delivery service in competition with Federal Express, using Wilmington as its hub. In 1985, ABF adopted "Airborne Express" as its trade name and in 1989 changed the name of the airline to ABX Air to eliminate confusion with the parent's trade name. In the 1990s, ABX Air was one of the top 10 all-cargo airlines in the world by ton-miles carried. In 2003, DHL bought ABF, then named simply Airborne, spinning off ABX Air because, as a foreign-owned company, DHL could not own a US carrier.

ABX Air's main customer is DHL, and the majority of the freight it carries is for that company. Many of ABX Air's aircraft are painted with DHL's yellow and red livery.

ABX also operated cargo flights on behalf of Air Jamaica between Miami and the two Jamaican cities of Montego Bay (Donald Sangster International Airport) and Kingston (Norman Manley International Airport). One of their Boeing 767-200s routinely handled the flights, replacing the Douglas DC-8 types that flew previously. The aircraft flew with an Air Jamaica callsign of "Jamaica".

== History ==
=== Midwest Air Charter ===
Midwest Air Charter (ICAO: AOH, call sign: AIR OHIO) (MAC) incorporated in Ohio at the end of 1970. MAC flew cashed checks for Ohio banks before starting doing the same for the Cleveland Federal Reserve Bank in 1972, a measure that reduced float. MAC was based at Elyria, Ohio and flew from Lorain County Airport until 1978 when it bought the airport at Wilmington, Ohio. MAC was originally classified as an air taxi, escaping the regulations of the Civil Aeronautics Board (CAB), the now-defunct Federal agency that, at the time, tightly regulated almost all US commercial air transport, by flying small aircraft. On 9 January 1978, the CAB granted MAC an all-cargo certificate allowing it to fly cargo between any two points in the US per the terms of the Air Cargo Deregulation Act of 1977.

In October 1976, MAC started flying on behalf of Seattle-based Airborne Freight Corporation (ABF), an air freight forwarder between 35 airports. In the 1970s, passenger airlines started withdrawing freighter aircraft from their fleets, leaving air freight forwarders without the overnight cargo flights that they needed. ABF was thus driven to chartering capacity from MAC. The need for ABF's own freight flights only increased with the advent of Federal Express and the 1977 US air cargo deregulation and ABF came to increasingly rely on MAC. In December 1978 ABF bought 9.5% of MAC. In 1979, ABF bought its own aircraft for MAC to fly. By year end 1979, MAC had 54 aircraft and was flying to 76 airports and accounted for over half of ABF's shipments. Finally in ABF 1980 bought out MAC entirely, the transaction closing April 16.

ABF replaced management and renamed the airline Airborne Express. Prior to its sale, MAC was doing business under the name "Midwest Charter Express", also the name of its corporate parent. MAC was controlled by M.J. Garrihy and Gilbert Singerman, who also controlled Wright Air Lines, a Cleveland-based regional carrier. MAC had some unusual fleet types, including the West German Hansa Jet and the French Caravelle. See Fleet.

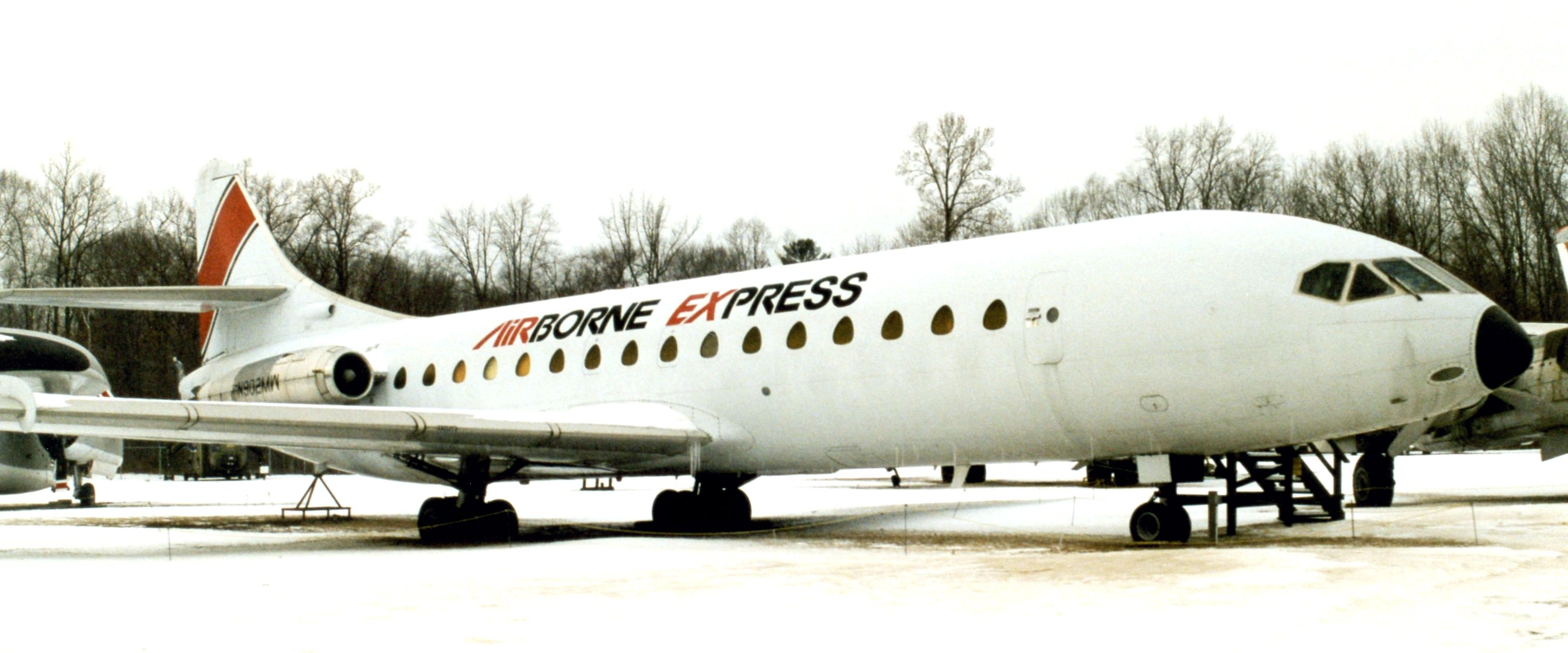
Former Airborne Express Caravelle on display at New England Air Museum

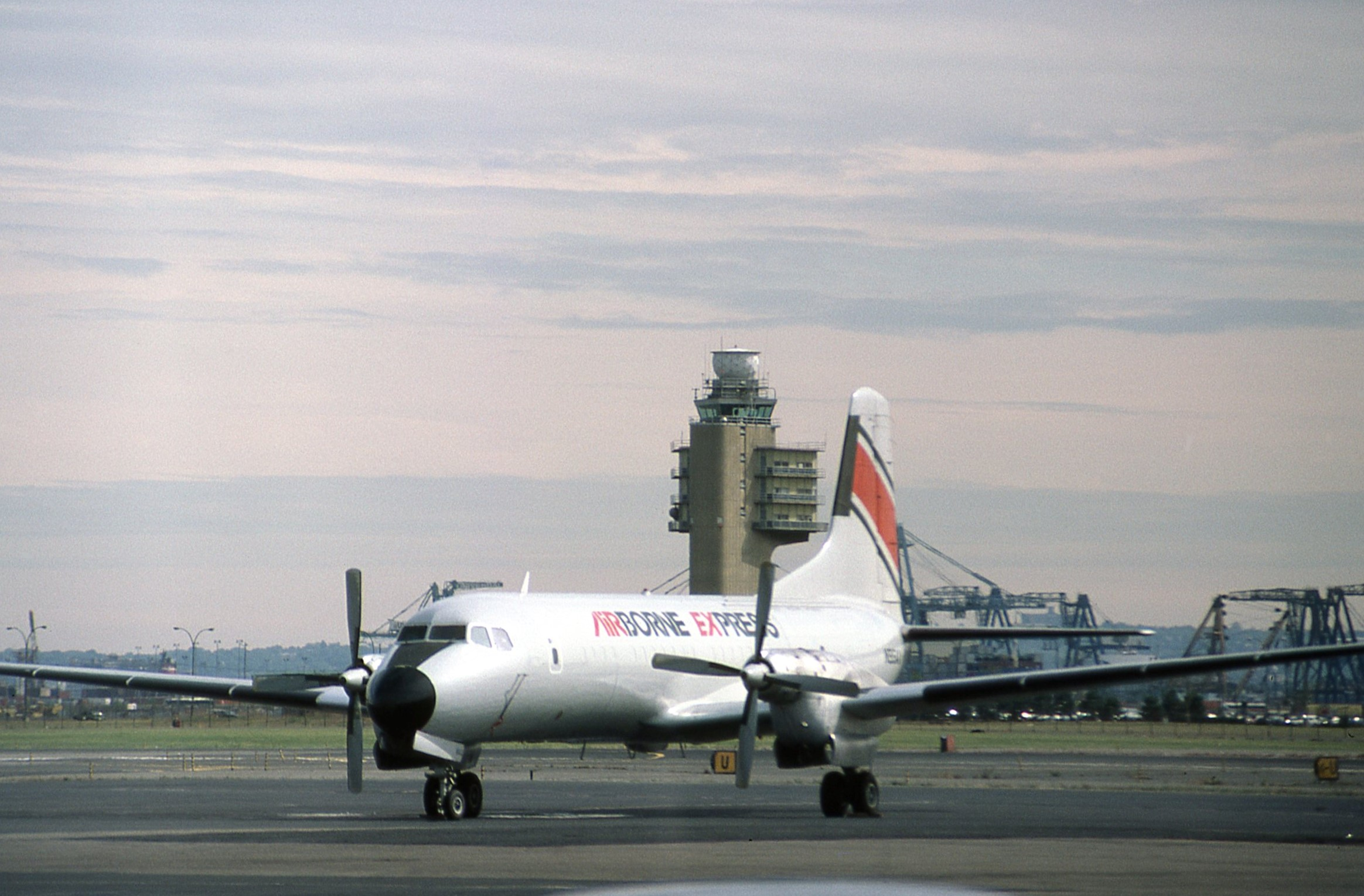
YS-11 at Newark 1984

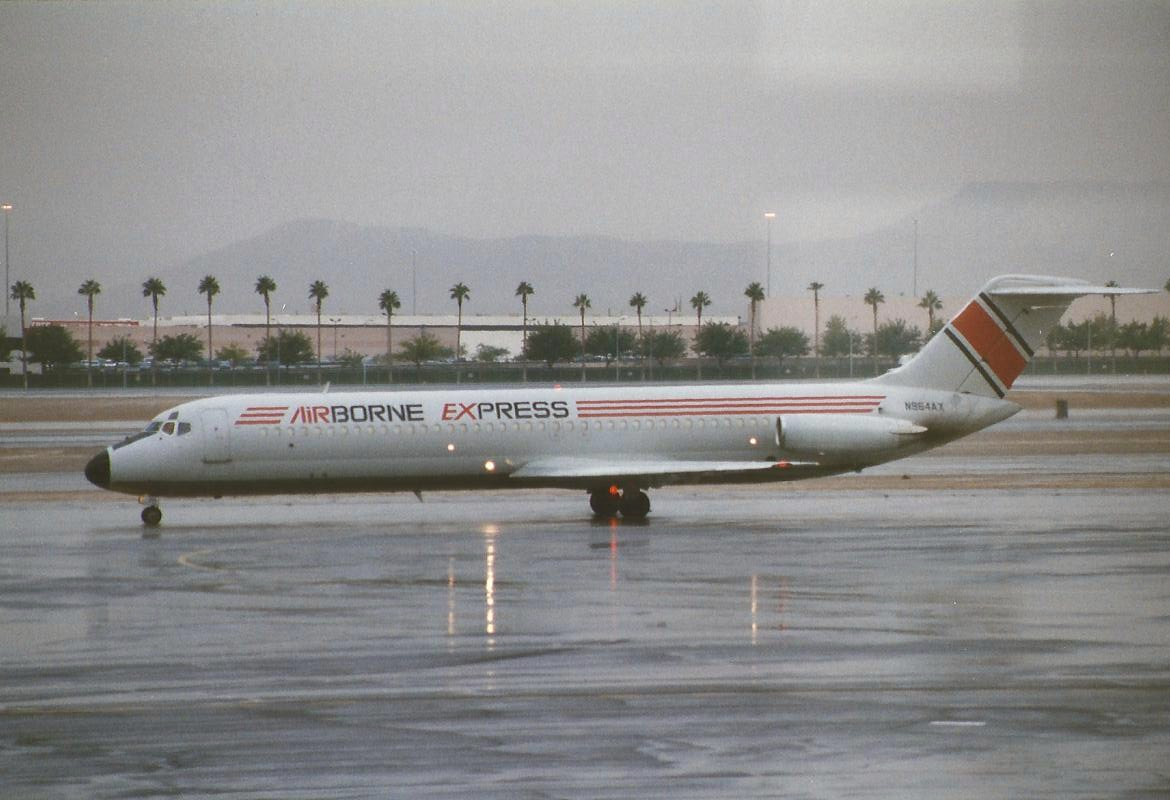
DC-9-41 Las Vegas 1998

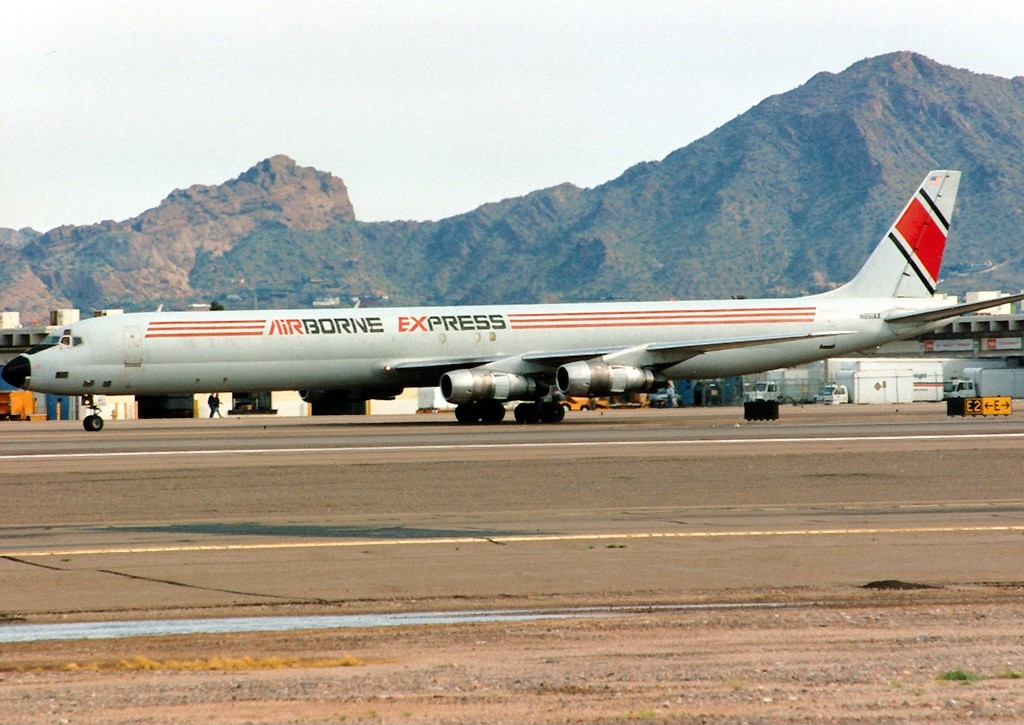
DC-8-61 at Phoenix 1995

=== Airborne Express ===
Airborne Express rationalized MAC: it inherited a fleet of 54 aircraft across 13 types which it reduced initially to Caravelles, Cessna Citations, Piper Navajos, NAMC YS-11s and Douglas DC-9s. It also exited the Federal Reserve contract which had timings incompatible with the package express business. By 1982, it slimmed the fleet to YS-11s and DC-9s (see Fleet). It added DC-8s in 1986. A characteristic of Airborne Express was its use of so-called C-containers, introduced in 1985 to fit through aircraft passenger doors, eliminating the expense of cutting a cargo door in the side of an aircraft. C-containers continued to be used even once the airline acquired 767s in the 1990s.

=== ABX Air ===
In early 1989, Airborne Express was re-named ABX Air, to eliminate possible confusion between "Airborne Express" the tradename for the whole company and the airline itself.

Apart from its core activity of cargo transportation, Airborne Express also performed airframe maintenance services to a number of aircraft types. By March 1995, the company had 5,500 employees. In January 1996, the company acquired 12 Boeing 767 aircraft for conversion to freighters. In 1996, the airline ranked number 9 among global all-cargo airlines by ton-miles carried.

ABX became a public company on August 16, 2003, as part of the merger of DHL and Airborne, in which DHL kept Airborne's ground operations and spun off its air operations as ABX Air Inc. ABX Air's common shares were traded on the NASDAQ National Market under the ticker symbol ABXA. In early 2007, ABX Air entered an ACMI agreement with All Nippon Airways to begin flying freight within Asia. The contract utilized two Boeing 767-200SF aircraft. In March 2007, the airline had 7,600 employees.

Previous logo until 2021.

On November 2, 2007, CEO Joe Hete and the ABX Air board of directors announced that the company had entered into an agreement to acquire Cargo Holdings International, the parent company of Air Transport International (ATI) and Capital Cargo International Airlines for a cost of $350 million. The transaction was finalized on December 31, 2007, and ABX Air was reorganized as a subsidiary of a holding company, later named Air Transport Services Group (ATSG). On November 10, 2008, ABX Air's largest customer, DHL, announced a plan to exit the United States domestic market. Previous plans by DHL had been to keep its U.S. operations by contracting them out to United Parcel Service. On March 30, 2010, ABX Air's parent company, ATSG, entered into new long-term agreements with DHL, under which ABX Air would continue providing airlift for the U.S. portion of DHL's international network.

== Fleet ==
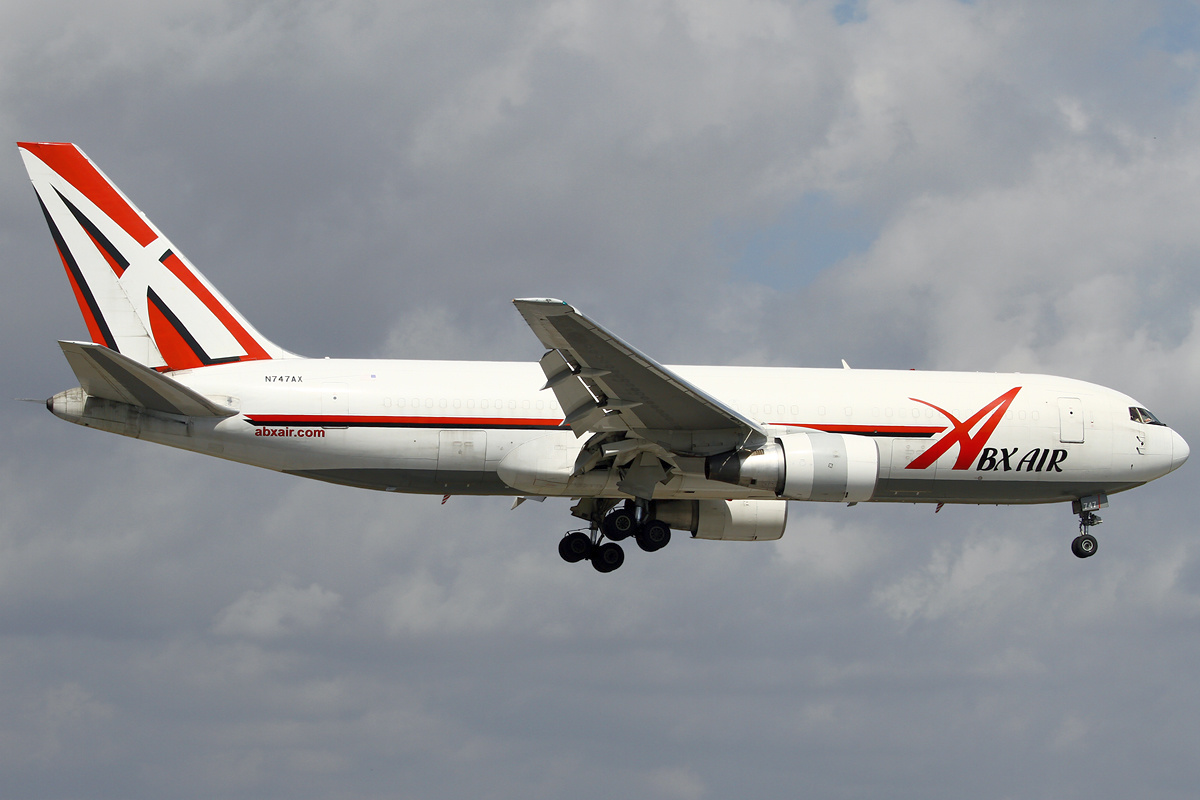
ABX Air Boeing 767-200, 2013

As of September 2026, the ABX Air fleet consists of the following aircraft:

ABX Air fleet
Aircraft	In fleet
Boeing 767-200BDSF	7
Boeing 767-300BDSF	26
Total	33

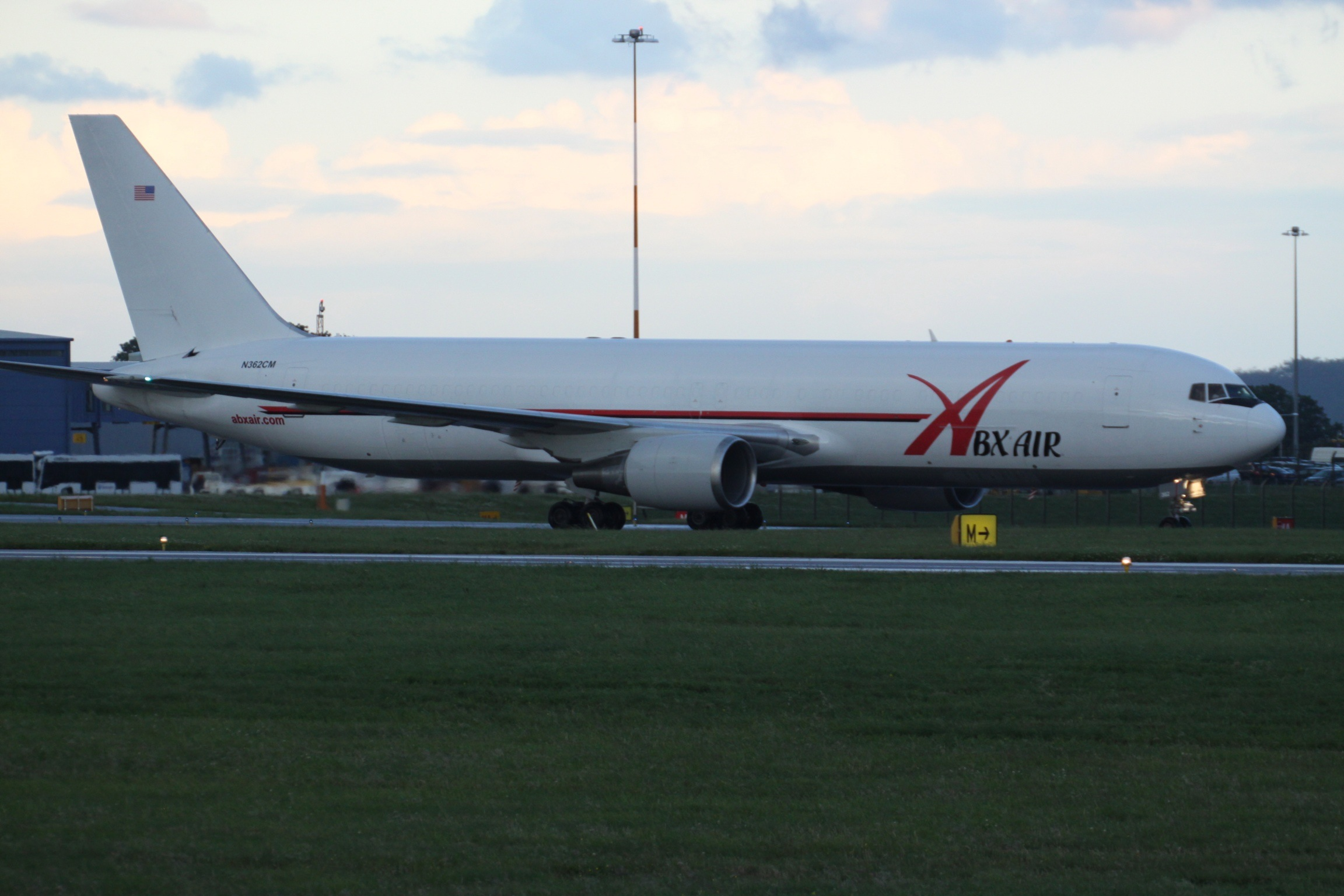
An ABX Air Boeing 767-300F

=== Historic fleet ===
World Airline Fleets 1979 (copyright 1979) shows Midwest Air Charter with:

- 2 Convair CV-600
- 4 HFB 320 Hansa Jet
- 5 Cessna 500 Citation
- 4 Sud Aviation SE-210 Caravelle IVR
- 1 Ted Smith Aerostar 600

Airborne Express fleet year-end 1982:

- 6 Douglas DC-9
- 13 NAMC YS-11

JP fleets 1989 (copyright May 1989) shows Airborne Express with:

- 7 DC-8-61
- 6 DC-8-62
- 2 DC-9-11/15
- 3 DC-9-31
- 8 DC-9-32
- 5 DC-9-33
- 12 NAMC YS-11A-205

ABX Air operated the following equipment throughout its history:

- McDonnell Douglas DC-8-63
- McDonnell Douglas DC-8-63F
- McDonnell Douglas DC-9-41

== Incidents and accidents ==
Airborne Express has experienced seven accidents, with six of them being hull losses, and two resulting in fatalities.

- On June 11, 1979, a Midwest Air Charter Carstedt Jet Liner 600 (modified de Havilland Dove) operating for ABF made a belly landing at St. Louis Lambert International Airport. Both crew members survived, but the aircraft was damaged beyond repair and written off.
- On June 19, 1980, a Sud Aviation Caravelle VI-R made a hard landing at Atlanta Municipal Airport (now Hartsfield–Jackson Atlanta International Airport), collapsing its left main landing gear. The aircraft was caught in wake turbulence from a Lockheed L-1011 TriStar. All four on board survived, but the aircraft was a write off.
- On February 5, 1985, a McDonnell Douglas DC-9-15 crashed after takeoff from Philadelphia International Airport. Both pilots on board survived, but the aircraft was substantially damaged and written off.

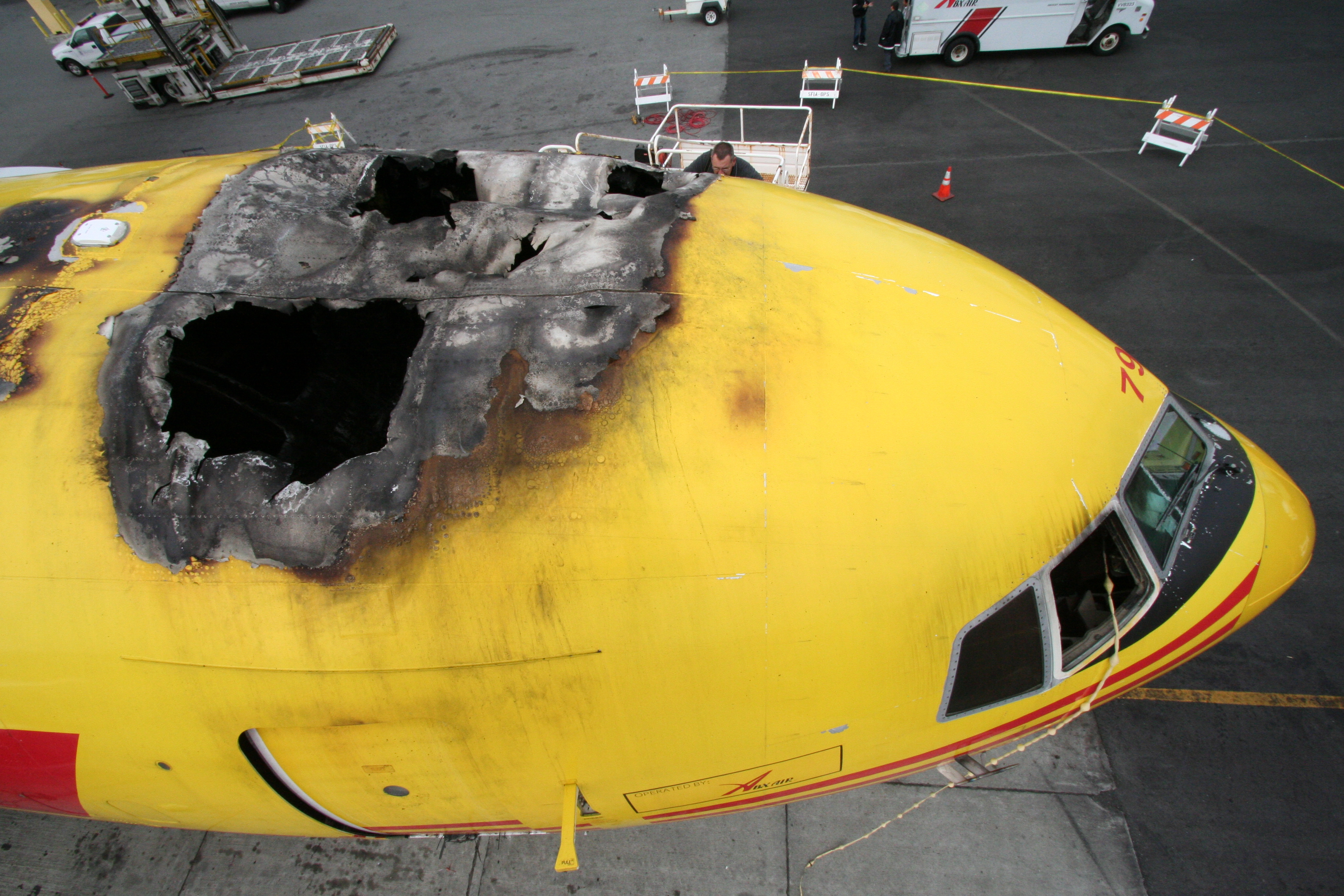
An ABX jet damaged by fire at SFO in 2008

- On March 6, 1992, a NAMC YS-11A was written off on a training flight when the crew forgot to lower the landing gear and the aircraft landed on its belly at Wilmington. The crew survived.
- On December 22, 1996, an Airborne Express DC-8-63F operating as Flight 827 conducted a test flight after undergoing modifications at Piedmont Triad International Airport. While performing a stall test the airplane entered into a real stall and the flight crew was unable to recover before it crashed into mountainous terrain near Narrows, Virginia. All six on-board were killed.
- On June 29, 2008, a Boeing 767 parked at San Francisco International Airport was damaged beyond repair by a fire that broke out as it was being prepared for flight. The probable cause was a design flaw that allowed wiring to be in close proximity to conductive components of an oxygen system, with the Federal Aviation Administration also cited for not requiring changes after Boeing had earlier identified the flaw.

== Sources ==
- Endres, Günter, ed. (2010). Flight International World Airlines 2010. Sutton, Surrey, England: Reed Business Information. ISBN 978-1-898779-39-1.
- Marcial, Gene G. (September 26, 2004). "Why ABX Air Is Really Delivering". Bloomberg Businessweek.
- Leeuw, Ruud (April 20, 2006). "Airborne Express". Airlines Remembered.
- "ABX Air sees 2Q earnings drop". Business First of Columbus. August 10, 2006.
- "ABX Holdings Announces Name Change to Air Transport Services Group". Air Transport Services Group, Inc. May 16, 2008. Archived from the original on June 1, 2008.
