= GA Telesis =

American aviation company

GA Telesis, LLC
- Type: Private
- Industry: Aviation
- Founded: April 10, 2002; 24 years ago Miami, Florida
- Founder: George E. Batchelor; Abdol Moabery
- Headquarters: Fort Lauderdale, Florida
- Area served: Worldwide
- Key people: Abdol Moabery (CEO)
- Owner: Tokyo Century Corporation (49.2%); Abdol Moabery (40.8%); All Nippon Airways (10%)
- Website: www.gatelesis.com

GA Telesis is an American multinational aviation company based in Fort Lauderdale. The company provides aviation aftermarket services, including component sales, aircraft maintenance, and aviation finance.

== History ==
GA Telesis was founded on April 10, 2002, by Abdol Moabery and George Edward Batchelor (founder of Arrow Air). Batchelor died in July 2002, shortly after the company's establishment. His stake was subsequently acquired by Moabery, a US Navy veteran who had served as Executive Vice President of Aviation Systems International and previously worked in trading with Soros Fund Management, backed by C&S Aviation Services. Moabery is a graduate of Florida Atlantic University and was a gubernatorial appointee to the Florida Atlantic University Board of Trustees from 2011 to 2021, holding its chairmanship from 2019 to 2021.

The company's name, GA Telesis, is derived from the initials of its founders, George Batchelor and Abdol Moabery. According to company sources, the term "Telesis" was chosen to represent deliberate progress. Batchelor initially proposed including their full names, but the final decision was to use initials.

Moabery stated in an interview with Jetrader magazine that GA Telesis began gaining industry recognition around 2006. In 2007, GA Telesis announced that a subsidiary of Merrill Lynch & Co., today part of Bank of America, had invested an undisclosed amount for a 49% stake in the aviation firm. In the same Jetrader interview, Moabery explained that he chose the investment from Merrill Lynch so that he could retain a controlling stake in the company.

In 2011, the company expanded its operations by acquiring Ultimate Aircraft Composites, a Fort Lauderdale based firm which repaired and manufactured composite material components for commercial airliners, such as radomes, flight control surfaces, and doors. The company further expanded operations in 2013 into aircraft engine repair, acquiring a part of Finnair's Engine Services division and rebranding it as GA Telesis Engine Services (GATES), employing 80 technicians. Early engines repaired by GATES include the General Electric CF6-80C2, CFM International CFM56-5B, and Pratt & Whitney PW2000. In 2012, GA Telesis partnered with Air China to form a joint venture, GA Innovation China, based in Beijing Capital International Airport, which aimed to serve as an integrated platform for trading used aircraft in China. By 2015, GATES employed 100 people.

In 2014, GA Telesis signed an agreement with Boeing to sell aircraft and engine components through a new section of Boeing's official parts marketplace. Under the agreement, Boeing would designate GA Telesis as a preferred partner for aircraft on-ground repair services, freighter conversions, and engine programs. This enabled GA Telesis to supply the Boeing marketplace with airframes and engine parts for all aircraft, regardless of manufacturer. GA Telesis' Boeing marketplace page would initially serve the 737 Classic, Boeing 737-800, 747, 757, 767, and 777, as well as the McDonnell Douglas MD-80, Airbus A320, A330, A340, De Havilland Canada Dash 8, and Bombardier CRJ.

GA Telesis' financial divisions grew, supported by an aviation investment fund created alongside Wafra Capital Partners. The fund, named GA Telesis Aviation Investments (GAIN), raised $500 million by January 2014, with the two companies starting a second firm, named GA Telesis Aviation Investments 2 (GAIN 2), in August 2017, which would raise another $500 million.

By 2019, GA Telesis' total annual revenue topped $1 billion, with mid-2020 estimates predicting that GA Telesis would make $400 million during the first year of the COVID-19 pandemic.

In 2020, GA Telesis signed a three-year parts distribution agreement with Honeywell's aerospace division, Honeywell Aerospace Technologies, to serve as the exclusive global distributor for the CFM International CFM56-5B variable bleed screw, excluding mainland China. Consequently, the Flight Solutions Group created a new subsidiary dedicated to distribution, named the Distribution Solutions Group. GA Telesis' consignment with Honeywell Aerospace enabled both companies to increase their available supply of used components and materials for distribution and servicing operations. The partnership with Honeywell expanded in 2023, not only to extend the bleed screw exclusivity, but also to include exclusive global distribution rights for the Flex Shafts for the CFM56-5B. As part of the seven-year agreement, GATES' Helsinki facility would offer variable bleed screw upgrades to its engine customers. Another agreement with Honeywell in 2023 would make GA Telesis the global distributor of Honeywell's Finished Goods Inventory, leading to its nomination by Honeywell as its 2023 Global Channel Partner of the Year.

In 2020, GA Telesis expanded GATES to include a Special Procedures AeroEngine Hospital, or SPAH, in Helsinki, which initially serviced engines used on the Airbus A320 family as well as the Boeing 737, 747, and 767. In 2021, GA Telesis announced a partnership with Air Transport Services Group (ATSG) to construct a SPAH at Wilmington Air Park in Clinton County, Ohio. By 2024, the Wilmington SPAH received certification from the American FAA and the European Union's EASA.

In 2021, GA Telesis and another aviation firm, Constant Aviation, filed a lawsuit against the technology company Salesforce for disclosing information without permission or knowledge. The two companies claimed in their filing that Salesforce's Master Subscription Agreement did not cover the purposes that Salesforce allegedly used their data for, arguing that Salesforce's use of their data constituted intellectual property infringement and violations of the Defend Trade Secrets Act.

GA Telesis was one of the many aviation lessors affected by the Russian invasion of Ukraine in 2022, and the subsequent sanctions imposed by Western countries on Russian firms. The company leased two Airbus A319s as well as their engines to Rossiya Airlines, which currently remain grounded in Russia. The Irish unit of GA Telesis filed suit against Rossiya and its parent company Aeroflot in 2022 over the two narrow-body jets remaining in Russia without the lessor's consent. In 2023, GA Telesis settled its claims by confirming that it had received compensation from Russian insurance firm NSK, though it did not disclose the amount. As a result, GA Telesis released NSK, Rossiya, and Rossiya's parent company, Aeroflot, from its claims on the two A319s and their engines.

In 2025, GA Telesis acquired AAR Corp's landing gear business.

== Structure ==
GA Telesis is split into five divisions: Flight Solutions Group (FSG), Leasing Investment Finance & Trading (LIFT), GA Telesis Engine Services (GATES), Maintenance Repair, and Overhaul (MRO), and Digital Innovation Group (DIG). The company's primary facilities are located between two buildings near Fort Lauderdale Executive Airport, with a composite material repair shop on the west side and its primary headquarters and component solutions group on the south side. The company also has 14 facilities in U.S. cities as well as 31 other facilities worldwide.

GA Telesis' LIFT division hosts multiple arms and units. Since 2017, the company has operated an arm named for and focused on structured credit products, which offers airlines an inventory lease of spare parts for a fixed monthly rent. Under the LIFT division, GA Telesis additionally operates HALO Air Finance, a joint venture with Tokyo Century Corporation and Inter-Vest Capital Partners. Formed in 2023, HALO's first major financing deal was a lease to Nauru Airlines of a Boeing 737-800 freighter converted from a former passenger aircraft. In 2024, HALO financed an investment vehicle managed by Crestone Air Partners and Atalaya Capital Management, which would acquire two Airbus A320-200s.

GATES presently maintains two major facilities, the first being located at Helsinki Airport at a former Finnair engine shop. Its second is at Wilmington Air Park in Ohio through a joint venture with Air Transport Services Group. In 2023, the Wilmington facility, which opened a Special Procedures Aeroengine Hospital (SPAH), received its Part 145 certification.

The MRO division of GA Telesis specializes in component repair and carbon fiber composite aircraft shops, as well as a landing gear shop purposed with detecting and implementing fixes for corrosion. According to company data, the landing gear group reported 149 percent growth from its founding in 2019 to 2023, and accounted for over 20 percent of the MRO division's revenue. In 2021, the division also added a radome testing facility, and earlier a 37-foot autoclave to its composite repair facility.

GA Telesis' Digital Innovation Group oversees activities related to artificial intelligence, including the founding of Blockrails in 2022, a subscription service that applies Blockchain-based tools to real estate transaction management.

== Corporate governance ==
Since its founding, Abdol Moabery has held the title of President and CEO. GA Telesis is organized under a limited liability company.

GA Telesis divisions also have their own presidents. To date, the Flight Solutions Group is led by Jim Sokol, LIFT by Marc Cho, the Engine Services facility in Helsinki by Gunnar Sigurfinnsson, and the MRO division by Pastor Lopez, with Jason Reed leading the Digital Innovation Group.
