= Omni Air International =

Airline of the United States

IATA	ICAO	Call sign
OY	OAE	OMNI-EXPRESS
- Founded: 1993; 33 years ago
- AOC #: CNMA334B
- Fleet size: 15
- Destinations: Worldwide
- Parent company: OAI Holdings, LLC
- Headquarters: Tulsa International Airport; Tulsa, Oklahoma
- Key people: David Ray (President)
- Website: www.oai.aero

Omni Air International, LLC is a United States charter airline headquartered in Hangar 19 on the grounds of Tulsa International Airport in Tulsa, Oklahoma, United States. It specializes in passenger charter flights and Aircraft, Crew, Maintenance and Insurance (ACMI) wet leasing. Omni Air International is a member of the Civil Reserve Air Fleet as a long-range international carrier. The airline is certified under FAA Part 121 and holds IATA Operational Safety Audit (IOSA) registration.

Omni Air International cooperates with Immigration and Customs Enforcement (ICE) in controversial (sometimes termed "high-risk") deportations under the first and second Donald Trump administrations. Omni Air International has been characterized as engaging in price gouging over its role in deportation flights, and has been accused by critics of facilitating human rights violations by the Trump administration.

== History ==
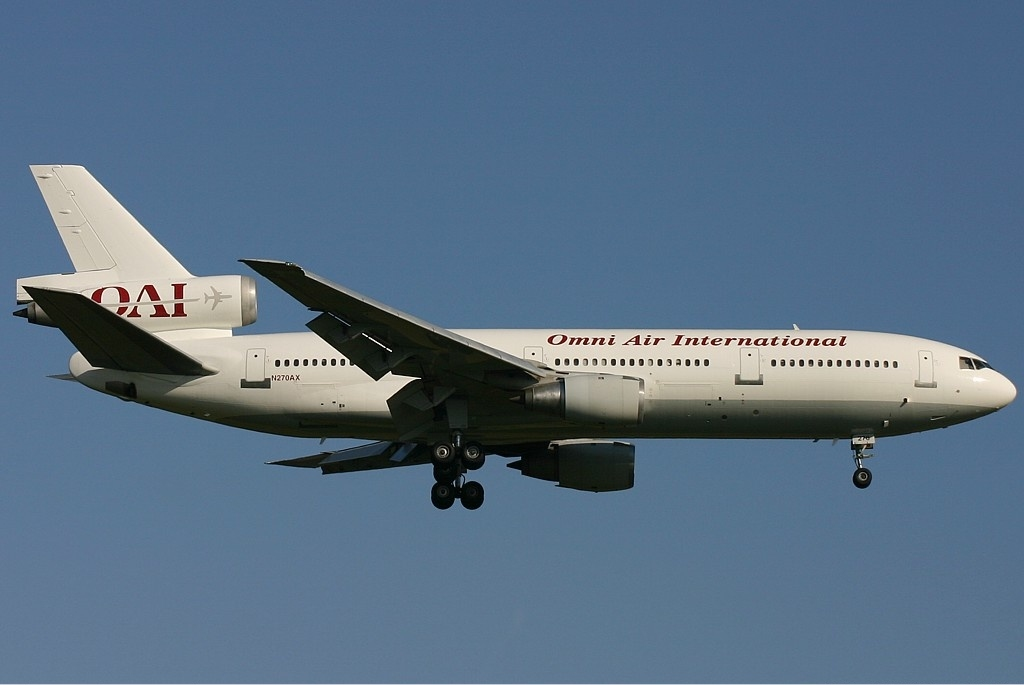
A former Omni Air International McDonnell Douglas DC-10 in 2005

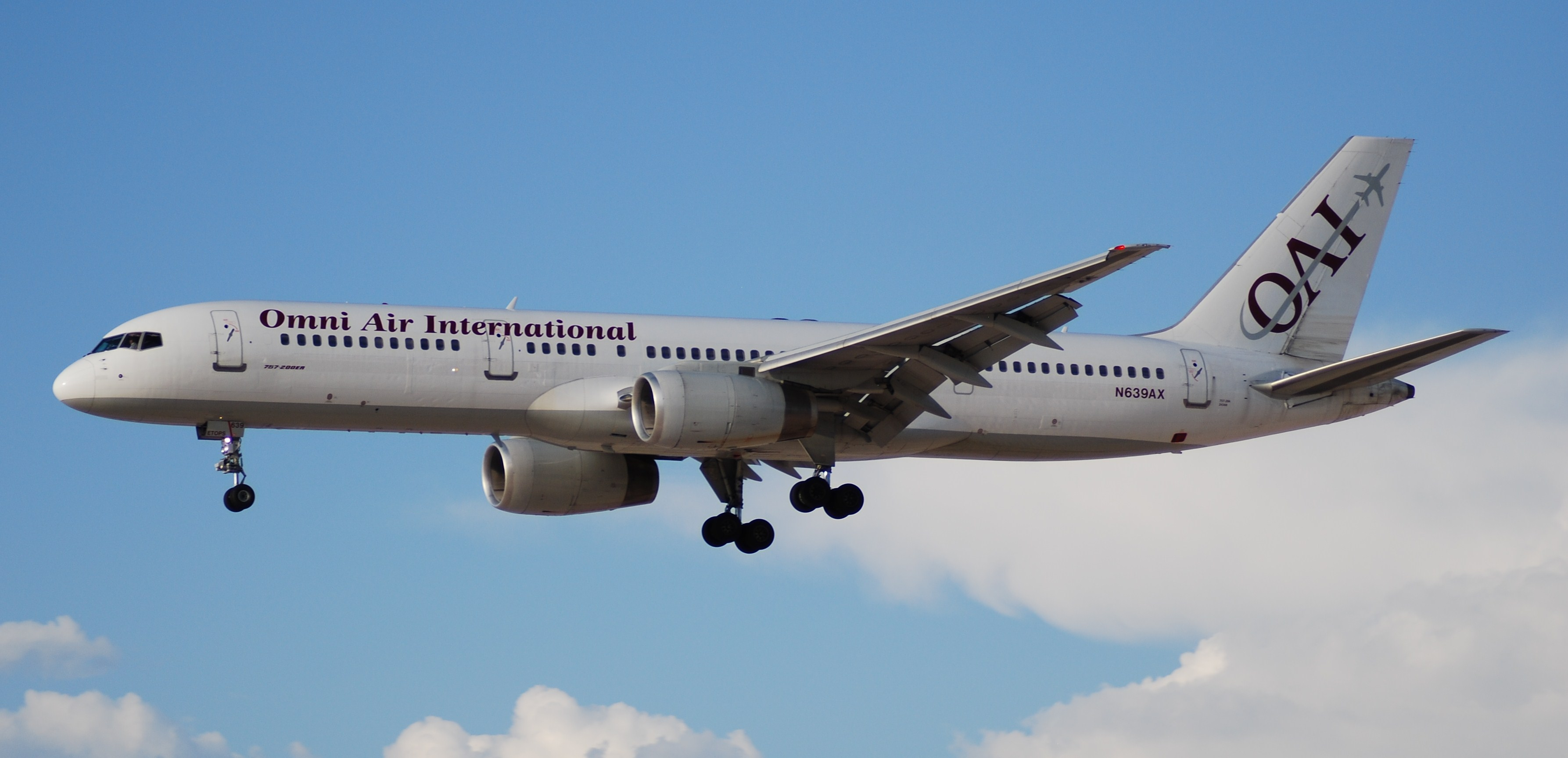
A former Omni Air International Boeing 757-200 in 2008.

The airline was established under the name Omni Air Express and started operations in March 1993 with a Boeing 727 freighter aircraft. In 1993, Omni started its Part 121 air carrier operations with Boeing 727F equipment in the narrow-body cargo market. Customers include integrated shipping companies such as BAX Global, DHL, Emery Worldwide, and UPS.

In 1997, the company changed its name to Omni Air International and launched passenger operations with DC-10s.

In 1998, the company sold its Boeing 727F fleet to focus exclusively on its passenger business. From 1998 to 2000, the company acquired three second-hand long-range McDonnell Douglas DC-10-30s and began providing international charter service to wholesale companies and cruise lines as well as wet lease Aircraft, Crew, Maintenance and Insurance (ACMI) for other airlines and the US Department of Defense.

On November 9, 2018, Air Transport Services Group acquired Omni Air for $845 million.

In 2020, Omni Air obtained $67 million in coronavirus relief aid, as well as a $77.65 million contract with the Trump administration's Department of Defense for "international charter airlift services."

In August 2021, U.S. president Joe Biden activated the Civil Reserve Air Fleet, utilizing 18 aircraft from six commercial airlines to ferry evacuees of Afghanistan from interim waystations throughout the Middle East and Europe. According to the Pentagon, the activation involves four aircraft from United Airlines; three aircraft each from American Airlines, Atlas Air, Delta Air Lines, and Omni Air; and two from Hawaiian Airlines.

Omni Air parent company Air Transport Services Group was purchased by the private equity firm Stonepeak in April 2025.

In September 2026, Stonepeak sold Omni Air to OAI Holdings, LLC.

== Deportations and involvement with ICE ==
Omni Air International has operated deportation flights under contract with U.S. Immigration and Customs Enforcement (ICE).

A 2019 report by Quartz stated that the airline was the sole provider willing to conduct certain deportation missions deemed "high-risk," and raised concerns about elevated costs for such services. According to University of Washington professor Angelina Godoy, who tracked human rights violations on ICE deportation flights, the reports of abuse on Omni Air were "significantly worse" than reports on other ICE Air charters.

Omni Air planes were used to deport Cameroonian refugees fleeing persecution relating to the Anglophone Crisis. Both Amnesty International and Human Rights Watch have concluded that the refugees were likely to be in danger if they returned to Cameroon, and that the deportation constituted refoulement, a violation of international law. Several of the deportees were, upon their return to Cameroon, held in squalid conditions, tortured and raped.

Use of "WRAP" devices to hogtie deportee onboard Omni Air flights was confirmed by ICE. In 2017, a plane deporting people to Somalia encountered a mechanical break that saw the plane diverted to Dakar, Senegal. Deportees were reportedly left shackled for 48 hours with little food, and when the plane's lavatories overflowed with human waste, the deportees had to urinate in a bottle or on themselves. The flight subsequently returned to the US with the deportees still on board.

Omni became the target of activists pushing Amazon to divest their 20% stake in the airline's parent company ATSG, which supplies charters for Prime Air.

== Fleet ==
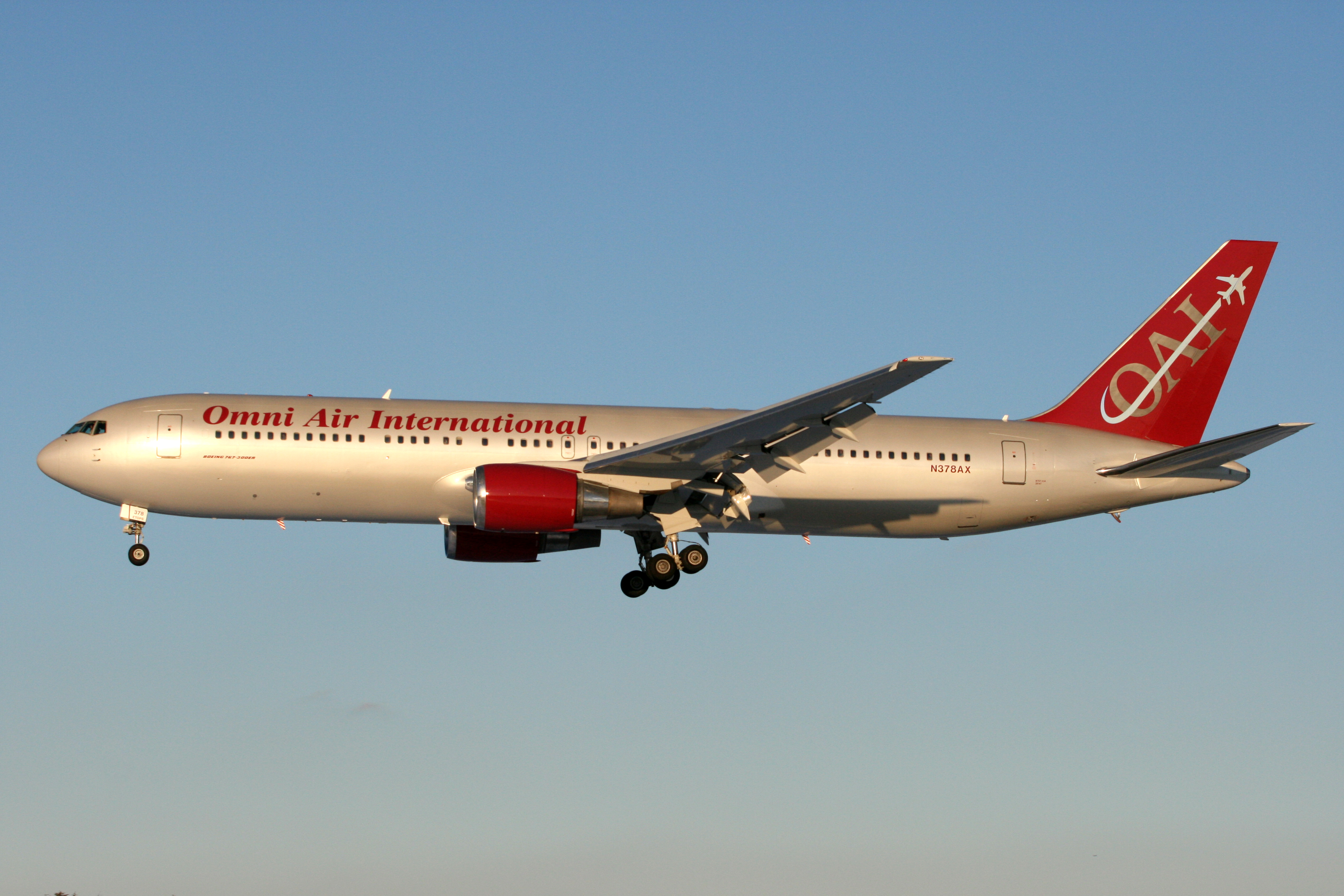
Omni Air International Boeing 767-300ER

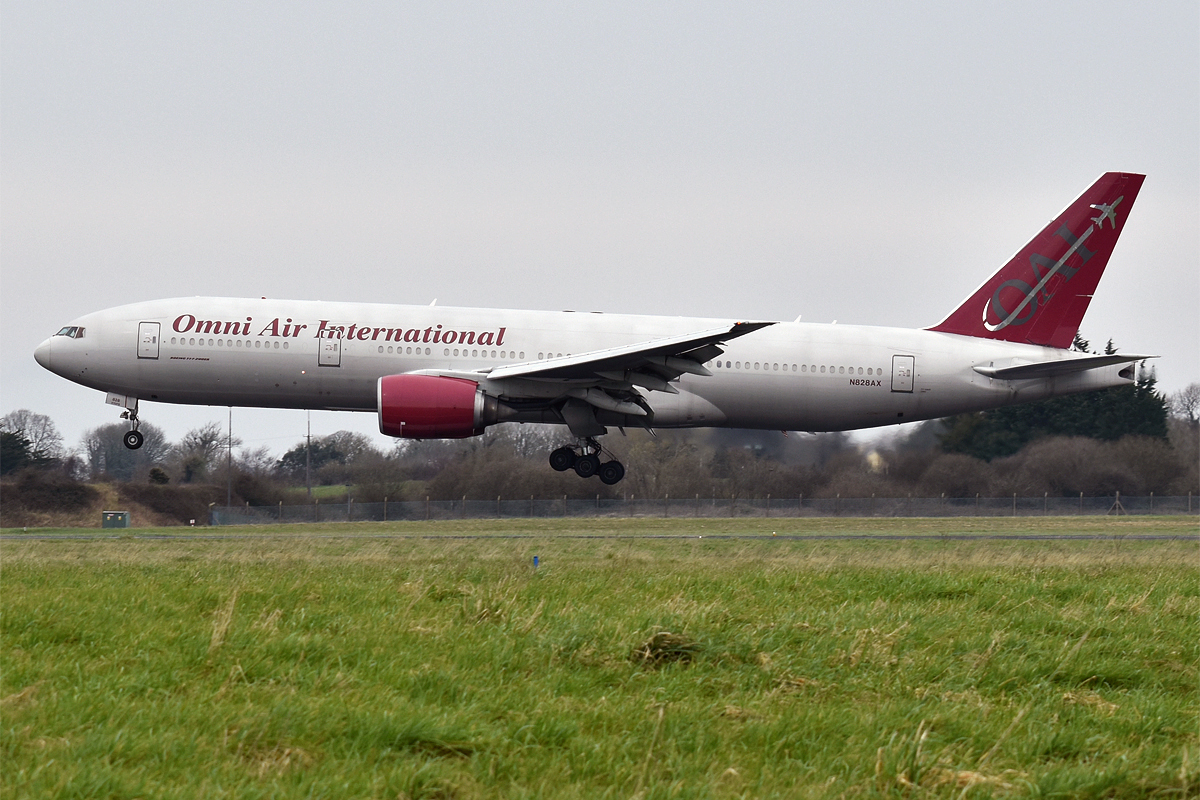
Omni Air International Boeing 777-200ER

As of August 2025, Omni Air International operates the following aircraft:

Aircraft	Total	Orders	Passenger Configurations			Notes
Aircraft	Total	Orders	B	Y	Total	Notes
Boeing 767-200ER	3	—	18	195	213	
Boeing 767-300ER	9	—	12	193	205	Includes two aircraft owned by the New England Patriots.
Boeing 767-300ER	9	—	24	224	248	Includes two aircraft owned by the New England Patriots.
Boeing 767-300ER	9	—	19	222	241	Includes two aircraft owned by the New England Patriots.
Boeing 767-300ER	9	—	44	203	247	Includes two aircraft owned by the New England Patriots.
Boeing 767-300ER	9	—	88	0	88	Includes two aircraft owned by the New England Patriots.
Boeing 777-200ER	3	—	0	381	381	
Total	15	—				

== Accidents and incidents ==
On 28 August 2020, an Omni Air International Boeing 767 (registered N423AX) operated a flight between Kabul, Afghanistan and Washington, United States with a scheduled refueling stop at Bucharest, Romania. During landing at the Romanian capital, the aircraft's left main landing gear collapsed. The aircraft skidded along the runway and evacuation slides were used by the 80 passengers to escape without injury.

Romania's SIAA found that the cause of the accident was a fracture in the outer cylinder of the left-hand main landing gear. During maintenance in 2015, the inner diameter cylinder was subjected to repeated cycles of chrome plating then grinding and polishing. The grinding machine was operating outside of input parameters, which caused excessive heat generation through friction, leading to heat damage to the base metal of the cylinder.
