= Capital Cargo International Airlines =

Cargo airline based in Orlando

IATA	ICAO	Call sign
PT	CCI	CAPPY
- Founded: 1995; 30 years ago
- Ceased operations: 2013; 12 years ago
- Hubs: Toledo Express Airport, Miami International Airport
- Fleet size: 11
- Destinations: 30
- Parent company: Air Transport Services Group
- Headquarters: Orlando, Florida, USA
- Website: http://www.capitalcargo.com/

Capital Cargo International Airlines, Inc. was a cargo airline based in Orlando, Florida, United States from 1995 to 2013. It provided on-demand and wet lease aircraft charter. Its main base was Orlando International Airport. It is owned by the Air Transport Services Group (Nasdaq: ATSG).

The airline ceased in name in March 2013 when it was merged with its sister airline Air Transport International.

== History ==
The airline was established in September 1995 and started operations in April 1996. It was founded by Peter Fox, the airline's Chairman, and obtained its operating certificate on April 24, 1996. It is wholly owned by Cargo Holdings International (CHI) and has 265 employees (at June 2011). (Note: CHI was founded in 1999.)

On November 2, 2007, Cargo Holdings International, the parent company of CCIA entered into an agreement to be acquired by Wilmington, OH-based ABX Holdings, Inc. The company along with sister company Air Transport International were run as separate companies under the Air Transport Services Group umbrella until 2013 when Capital Cargo was formally absorbed by Air Transport.

CHI and ABX Holdings have entered into an agreement under which ABX Holdings will purchase the stock of CHI. After the closing of that transaction, CHI and its wholly owned subsidiaries will be held by ABX Holdings as the parent company. ABX Air, Inc., Capital Cargo International Airlines, Inc., and Air Transport International Limited Liability Company will each continue to operate as separate and independent air carriers. Cargo Aircraft Management, Inc. and LGSTX Group, Inc. will also continue to operate as wholly owned subsidiaries of CHI.

== Destinations ==
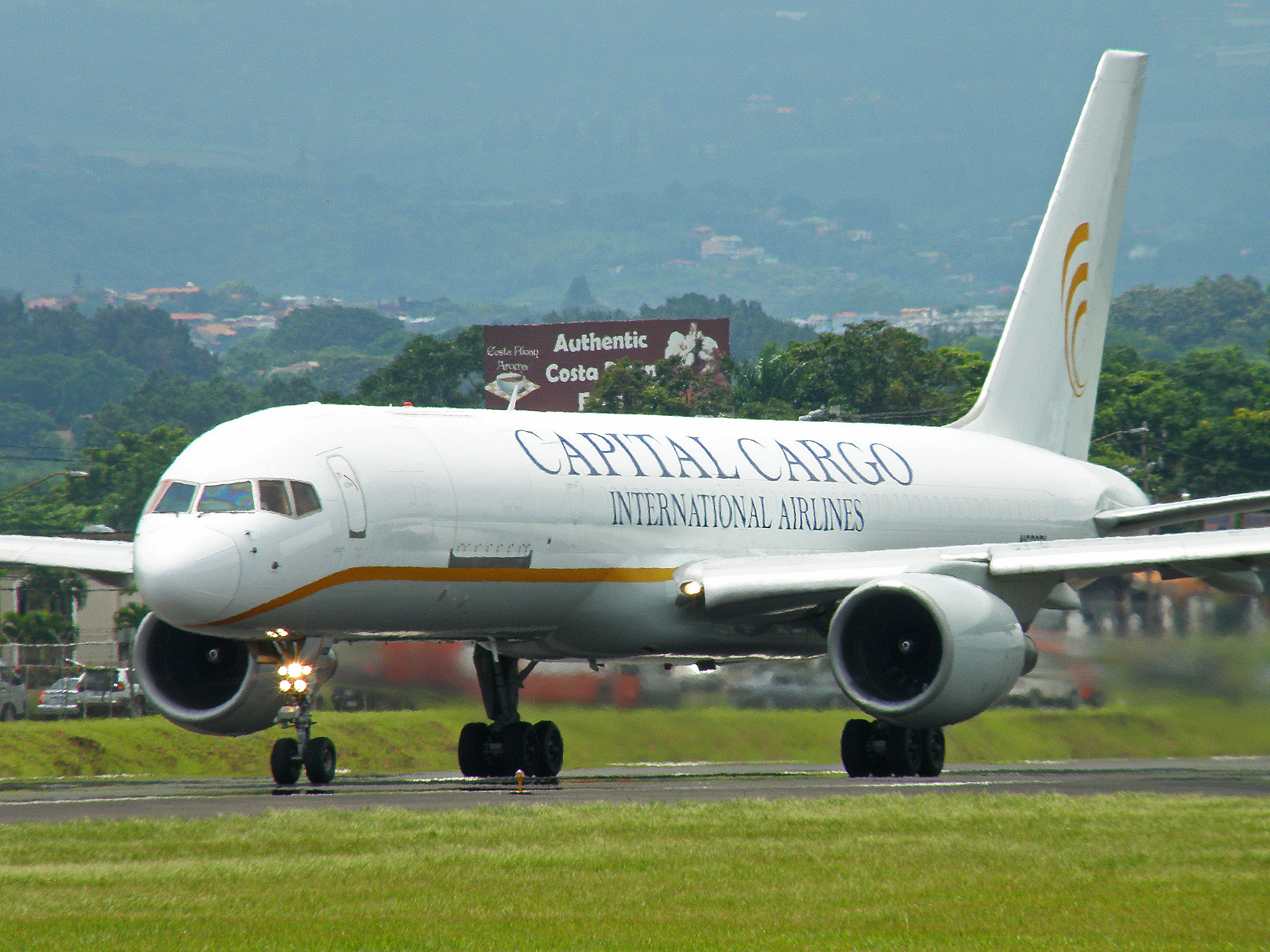
Capital Cargo International Airlines Boeing 757

- Canada
  - Calgary, Alberta (Calgary International Airport)
- Caribbean
  - San Juan, Puerto Rico (Luis Muñoz Marín International Airport)
- Dominican Republic
  - Santiago de los Caballeros (Cibao International Airport)
  - Santo Domingo (Las Americas International Airport)
- Mexico
  - El Marques, Mexico (Querétaro International Airport)
  - Guadalajara, Mexico (Guadalajara International Airport)
- United States
  - Atlanta, Georgia (Hartsfield-Jackson Atlanta International Airport)
  - Boston, Massachusetts (Logan International Airport)
  - Charlotte, North Carolina (Charlotte Douglas International Airport)
  - Cincinnati, Ohio (Cincinnati/Northern Kentucky International Airport)
  - El Paso, Texas (El Paso International Airport)
  - Fort Lauderdale, Florida (Fort Lauderdale-Hollywood International Airport)
  - Harlingen, Texas (Valley International Airport)
  - Hartford, Connecticut (Bradley International Airport)
  - Memphis, Tennessee (Memphis International Airport)
  - Miami, Florida (Miami International Airport)
  - Minneapolis and St. Paul, Minnesota (Minneapolis-Saint Paul International Airport)
  - Orlando, Florida (Orlando International Airport)
  - Phoenix, Arizona (Phoenix Sky Harbor International Airport)
  - Raleigh-Durham, North Carolina (Raleigh-Durham International Airport)
  - Rochester, New York (Greater Rochester International Airport)
  - San Diego, California (San Diego International Airport)
  - Saint Louis, Missouri (Lambert St. Louis International Airport)
  - Seattle, Washington (King County International Airport)
  - Toledo, Ohio (Toledo Express Airport)

== Fleet ==
The Capital Cargo International Airlines fleet consisted of the following aircraft (as of 2012):

Capital Cargo International Airlines Fleet
Aircraft	Total	Notes
Boeing 757-200PCF	3	Cargo conversion by Flightstar Aircraft Services KVQQ
Boeing 727-200	5	

== See also ==
- List of defunct airlines of the United States
