= Wilmington Air Park =

Airport in Wilmington, Ohio

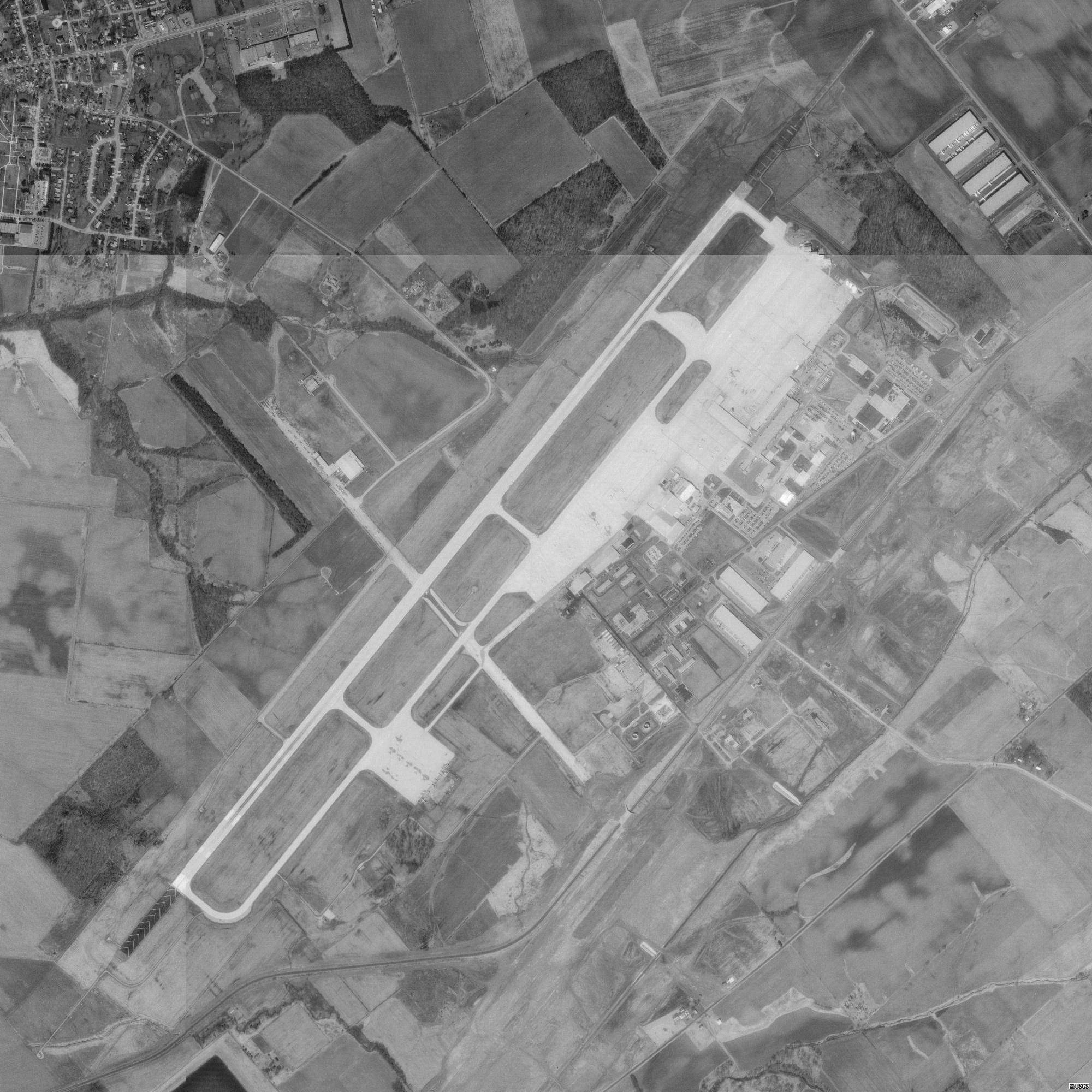
- USGS aerial image as of 22 March 1994 (only one runway at the time)
- IATA: ILN; ICAO: KILN; FAA LID: ILN

Summary
- Airport type: Public
- Owner: Clinton County Port Authority
- Location: Wilmington, Ohio
- Focus city for: Amazon Air
- Elevation AMSL: 1,077 ft (328 m)
- Coordinates: 39°25′41″N 083°47′32″W
- Website: www.wilmingtonairpark.com

Maps
- FAA airport diagram

- Location of airport in Ohio ILN (the United States)

Runways
Direction	Length		Surface
Direction	ft	m	Surface
04L/22R	10,701	3,262	Concrete
04R/22L	9,000	2,743	Concrete

Statistics (2016)
- Aircraft operations (year ending 1/1/2016): 1,000
- Source: Federal Aviation Administration

Wilmington Air Park (IATA: ILN, ICAO: KILN, FAA LID: ILN) is a public-use airport located two nautical miles (3.7 km) southeast of the central business district of Wilmington, a city in Clinton County, Ohio, United States. While DHL had privately owned the property while operating from the facility, the company agreed to donate the airfield to the Clinton County Port Authority.

The airport was formerly known as Clinton County Air Force Base and Airborne Airpark.

As of 2020, the airport was among the busiest cargo-only airports in the U.S. In 2021 and 2024, the airport was named one of the top airports in the state of Ohio.

== History ==
The airport opened in 1929 and a small hangar was built in 1930. The landing strip was approved by the Civil Works Administration in 1933. In 1940, the Civil Aeronautics Authority took control of Wilmington Airport for use as an emergency landing field. In 1942, the United States Army Air Forces took over the airport, renaming it Clinton County Army Air Field. With the establishment of an independent U.S. Air Force in 1947, the installation was renamed Clinton County Air Force Base and primarily supported Air Force Reserve flight operations and training under the 302d Troop Carrier Wing (1952-67), which then became the 302d Tactical Airlift Wing and briefly the 302d Special Operations Wing (1967-71). The main runway was extended to 9,000 feet (2,700 m) in 1960.

The base was decommissioned as an Air Force installation in 1972 and the Community Improvement Corporation (CIC) began developing the area as the Wilmington Industrial Air Park (WIAP). It also became home to the Great Oaks Joint Vocation School.

=== Overseas National Airways ===
From 1972 to 1977, charter airline Overseas National Airways had a base at Wilmington Air Park, as part of which the airline also controlled the airfield. ONA moved functionality to Wilmington from a prior base in Norfolk, Virginia. Employment peaked at 140 in early 1976. Among other duties, the base performed the complete interior reconfigurations, such as of several DC-8s purchased from Eastern Air Lines, moving galleys and lavatories to accommodate high density seating. The base also handled dispatch of ONA's domestic cargo fleet, which operated for the US Air Force Logair system, and also delivered car parts. ONA shut the base after it disposed of its DC-8 fleet in 1977. The assets were sold to an independent maintenance organization called Ohio Air Center, which took over in November.

In 1977, the Southern State Community College opened, using old barracks buildings as classrooms. In 1980, Midwest Air Charter was acquired by Airborne Freight Corporation, resulting in Airborne Express, which became the largest tenant at WIAP.

A second runway, 9,000 feet (2,700 m) long, was opened in early September 1995.

In 2003, as part of the merger of DHL and Airborne, DHL kept Airborne's ground operations and spun off its air operations as ABX Air. The facility was a major sorting center for package delivery service DHL Express between 2005 and the sorting center's closing in July 2009, following then Deutsche Post-owned DHL's cessation of US domestic delivery services.

=== Transition to Public Ownership ===
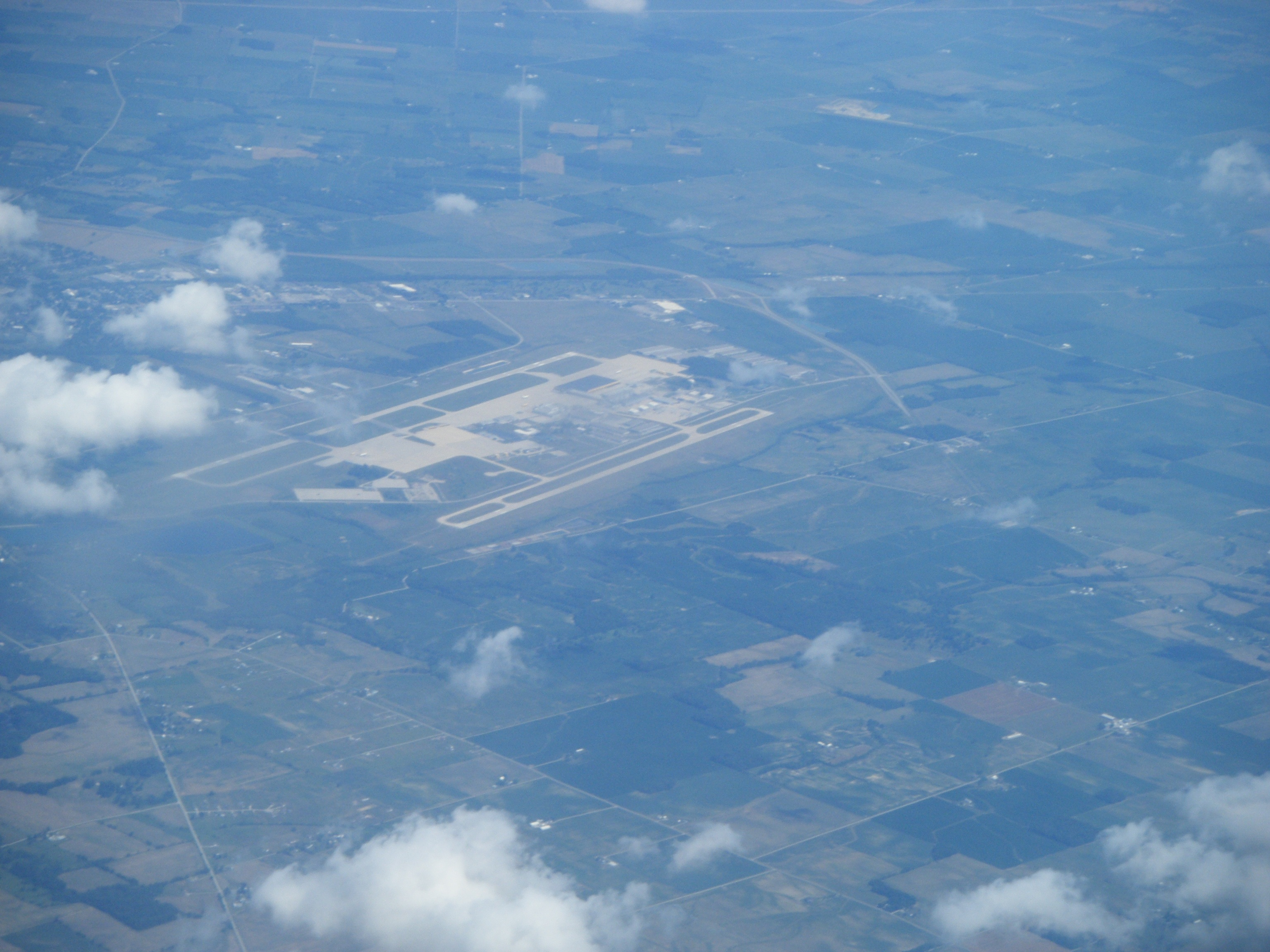
Aerial view of Airborne Airpark in 2012

On January 19, 2010, DHL agreed to turn over the airport, including its two runways, control tower, buildings and cargo storage facilities to the Clinton County Port Authority. The donation became effective on June 2, 2010. While no concrete plans were set, the port authority planned to work with local and state officials on redeveloping the property.

A comprehensive Redevelopment Study for the Wilmington Air Park was completed in December 2011.

In January 2012, the Clinton County Port Authority was in conversations with the Ohio Air National Guard for the possible return of a U.S. Air Force presence at the airport, with possible use as a joint civil-military airfield by the Air National Guard to operate model specific Unmanned Aerial Vehicles (UAV)

=== Project Aerosmith and Amazon Air ===
After years of dormancy, cargo activity resumed during second half of 2015. Operated under the code name Project Aerosmith, Wilmington-based Air Transport Services Group was performing a trial run for a potential Amazon.com air cargo operation, the future Amazon Air. In December 2015, Amazon announced that frustration with third-party carriers had led to them investigating their own cargo operation to be flown potentially by ATSG, Atlas Air, or Kalitta Air. As part of a trial, five ATSG Boeing 767s were being operated from Wilmington to airports near Amazon distribution centers, with 219 flights operated between November 1 and December 17, 2015, in contrast to seven in the previous period the year before.

In March 2016, Amazon announced leases for 20 767s with its Wilmington operations to be supported by ATSG and its subsidiaries including Air Transport International, which served as Amazon's primary carrier. In this announcement, Amazon received options to purchase up to 19.9 percent of ATSG stock, exercisable over a five-year period.

In January 2017 Amazon announced it would shift flight operations to Cincinnati/Northern Kentucky International Airport (CVG) alongside a major expansion of service. The move was finalized on April 30, 2017, when the last Amazon flight departed. Despite the shift to CVG appearing to be the end of Amazon service at ILN, it was announced in November 2018 that ILN would again open for Amazon so that capacity demands could be met during construction of the company's sort facility at CVG, with operations resuming in June 2019.

=== Expanding Business Offerings ===
In 2023, the airport announced it would lease space for offices as well as research, development, and testing to Vector ElectroMagnetics. The company researches, designs, and develops specialized hardware, equipment, and materials for the United States Department of Defense; prime customers include the US Armed Forces and military contractors.

As of May of 2024, According to the Bureau of Labor Statistics, The Wilmington Air Park is the 21st cargo airport in the US by volume, having shipped 631 Million pounds of cargo in the previous 12 months. It remains the top cargo airport in Ohio.

== Facilities and aircraft ==
=== Facilities ===
The Wilmington Air Park covers an area of 2,000 acres (810 ha) at an elevation of 1,077 feet (328 m) above mean sea level. It has two concrete surfaced runways: 04L/22R is 10,701 by 150 feet (3,262 x 46 m) and 04R/22L is 9,000 by 150 feet (2,743 x 46 m).

A 2024 grant allowed the airport to begin rehab on its second runway. That runway, was originally built by an expanding Airborne Express in the mid 90's which was later sold to DHL.

The airport has a fixed-base operator that sells jet fuel and offers limited amenities. Prior permission is required to use the facility.

As of 2023, the airport's dozen hangars are shared by 60 tenants that employ nearly 5,000 people.

=== Aircraft ===
For the 12-month period ending January 1, 2016, the airport had 1,000 aircraft operations, an average of 83 per month: 90% air taxi and 10% scheduled commercial.

== Accidents and incidents ==
- A Skyhook balloon launched from the base on January 7th, 1948 is believed to have been responsible for the Mantell UFO incident, in which a Kentucky Air National Guard P-51 Mustang crashed while in pursuit of an unidentified object.
- On April 18, 1964, two USAF Fairchild C-119 Flying Boxcars (#s 50-138, 50-135) of the 302 Troop Carrier Wing collided 10km (6.3mi) NE of ILN while on approach, both crashing after returning from an aborted nighttime paradrop mission in deteriorating weather conditions. A total of 17 occupants on both aircraft died; two survived.
- On August 9, 1968, a USAF Fairchild C-119 Flying Boxcar crashed and caught fire shortly after takeoff 2km (1.3mi) N of ILN. Apparently one engine lost power. There was six fatalities out of the 31 total occupants on board.
- On August 7, 2022, one person died and 8 first responders were injured when an automatic fire foam suppression system deployed inside one of the Air Transport and Service Group aircraft hangars.

== See also ==
- List of airports in Ohio
