= Air Transport Services Group =

American aviation holding company

Air Transport Services Group Inc.
- Type: Subsidiary
- Industry: Airlines
- Headquarters: Wilmington, Ohio, United States
- Key people: Greg Mays (President and Chief Executive Officer); Josh Carter (Chief Legal Officer); Todd France (Chief Commercial Officer); Matthew Scagnelli (Chief Human Resources Officer); Tim Schulze (Chief Risk & Corporate Development Officer); Bill Trousdale (Chief Financial Officer); Ash Hall (Senior VP Enterprise Strategic Sourcing and Procurement); Doug Belding (VP Enterprise Performance and Operating Systems); Paul Harding (VP Information Technology); Mike Hough (Group President Airlines and Services); Joe King (VP Finance)
- Parent: Stonepeak
- Website: www.atsginc.com

Air Transport Services Group Inc. (ATSG) is an American aviation holding company which provides air cargo transportation and related services to domestic and foreign air carriers and other companies that outsource their air cargo lift requirements.

It is the world's largest lessor of converted Boeing 767 freighter aircraft through its leasing division, Cargo Aircraft Management. Through its principal subsidiaries, including three airlines with separate and distinct U.S. FAA Part 121 Air Carrier certificates, the firm provides aircraft leasing, air cargo lift, passenger ACMI and charter services, aircraft maintenance services and airport ground services.

ATSG's subsidiaries include Cargo Aircraft Management; ABX Air; Air Transport International; Airborne Global Solutions; Airborne Maintenance & Engineering Services, including its subsidiary, Pemco Conversions dba Pemco World Air Services; and LGSTX Services.

== History ==
ABX Holdings, Inc. was created on 31 December 2007 when ABX Air purchased Cargo Holdings International. On 16 May 2008, the company changed its name to Air Transport Services Group.

ATSG announced that they had agreed to acquire a 25 percent equity interest in West Atlantic of Gothenburg, Sweden on December 9, 2013.

In March 2016, ATSG announced an agreement to operate an air cargo network to serve Amazon.com customers in the United States including the leasing of 20 Boeing 767 freighter aircraft by ATSG subsidiary Cargo Aircraft Management; the operation of the aircraft by ATSG airline, Air Transport International; and gateway and logistics services provided by LGSTX Services. The 20 leases will be for five to seven years and operations agreements are for five years. ATSG will also grant Amazon warrants to soon buy 9.99% and up to 19.9% over a five-year period of ATSG common shares. May 2021, Amazon.com exercised ATSG warrants it holds to acquire 19.5% of their common shares, including a cash equity investment of $132 million.

In January 2017, ATSG announced it had acquired Tampa, Florida-based PEMCO World Air Services, a commercial aircraft maintenance, repair & overhaul provider and Boeing 737 passenger-to-freighter conversion house.

On October 2, 2018, ATSG announced that it had agreed to acquire Omni Air International LLC (Omni Air) based in Tulsa, Oklahoma. Omni Air is a passenger ACMI and charter services provider with significant experience serving U.S. and allied foreign governments plus commercial customers. They are a leading provider of passenger airlift services to the U.S. Department of Defense (DoD) via the Civil Reserve Air Fleet (CRAF) program, and a worldwide provider of full-service passenger charter and ACMI services. Omni Air also carries passengers worldwide for a variety of private sector customers and government services firms. Omni Air, founded in 1993, is an FAR Part 121 certificated and IATA Operational Safety Audit registered airline.

In December 2018 it was announced that additional agreements to lease and operated ten additional Boeing 767s for Amazon.com Services, Inc., to extend leases for twenty 767 aircraft ATSG provides to Amazon and extend the operating agreement through which ATSG's airline operate those aircraft in the Amazon Network.

ATSG ceased to hold an equity interest in West Atlantic AB, upon its acquisition by Lusat Air, a Spanish company, in June 2019.

On February 24, 2020, CEO Joe Hete announced his retirement effective on May 7, 2020, after 40 years of service to ATSG and its subsidiary companies. On May 7, 2020, Joe Hete was elected as chairman of the board for ATSG and Rich Corrado was elected CEO and President of ATSG.

In June 2020, Air Transport Services Group, Inc. has deployed a Boeing 767-300 converted freighter in June in support of the DHL Express network in Asia under the terms of a stand-alone ACMI agreement with DHL-Bahrain.

In May 2021, ATSG and Fort Lauderdale aerospace firm GA Telesis announced a joint venture to establish an Engine Services facility in the United States; GA Telesis had previously constructed an engine facility at Helsinki Airport in Finland. It was later announced in 2022 that the Wilmington Air Park in Clinton County, Ohio, was selected to be the site of a Special Procedures Aeroengine Hospital (SPAH). ATSG and GA Telesis received a 1.3 percent tax credit designated for job creation from Ohio's tax credit authority, with JobsOhio also providing financial assistance for the construction, estimating that 50 new high-paying jobs would come to Wilmington through the repair facility. By November 2023, the Wilmington SPAH would receive certification from the American FAA, and later the European Union's EASA in April 2024, initially servicing aircraft engines manufactured by GE Aerospace and CFM International.

In November 2024, it announced it had reached an agreement to be acquired by Stonepeak. In April 2025, this transaction was finalized.

In September 2026, ATSG agreed to sell Omni Air International to OAI Holdings, LLC. The sale was finalized on November 9, 2026.

== Subsidiaries ==
- Airborne Global Solutions
- Airborne Training Services
- Air Transport International – Cargo and Passenger airline
- ABX Air – Cargo airline
- Cargo Aircraft Management – aircraft and engine leasing division
- Airborne Maintenance & Engineering Services – Maintenance, Repair & Overhaul (MRO)
- PEMCO Conversions – Boeing 737 and Airbus A321 Passenger to Freighter Conversion
- LGSTX Services – Airport Support Services Company
- TriFactor Solutions – Material Handling Integrated Solutions, Equipment, Installation and Services
