= Air Transport International =

American charter and cargo airline

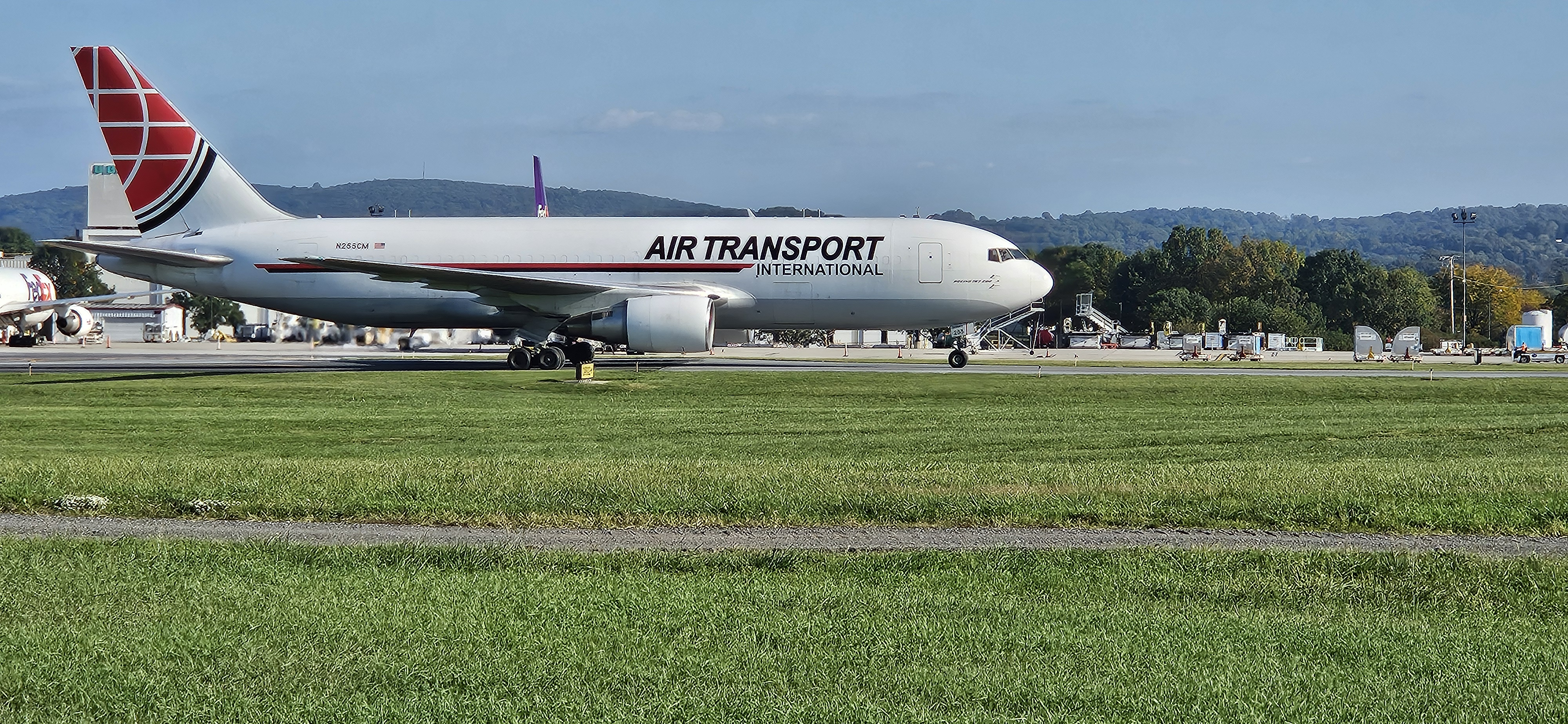
- A Boeing 767 of Air Transport International
IATA	ICAO	Call sign
8C	ATN	AIR TRANSPORT
- Founded: 1981
- Commenced operations: 1988 (under former Interstate ownership)
- AOC #: IXXA394N
- Hubs: Cincinnati/Northern Kentucky International Airport
- Fleet size: 49
- Parent company: Air Transport Services Group
- Headquarters: Wilmington, Ohio, United States
- Key people: Mike Betson (President)
- Website: www.airtransport.cc

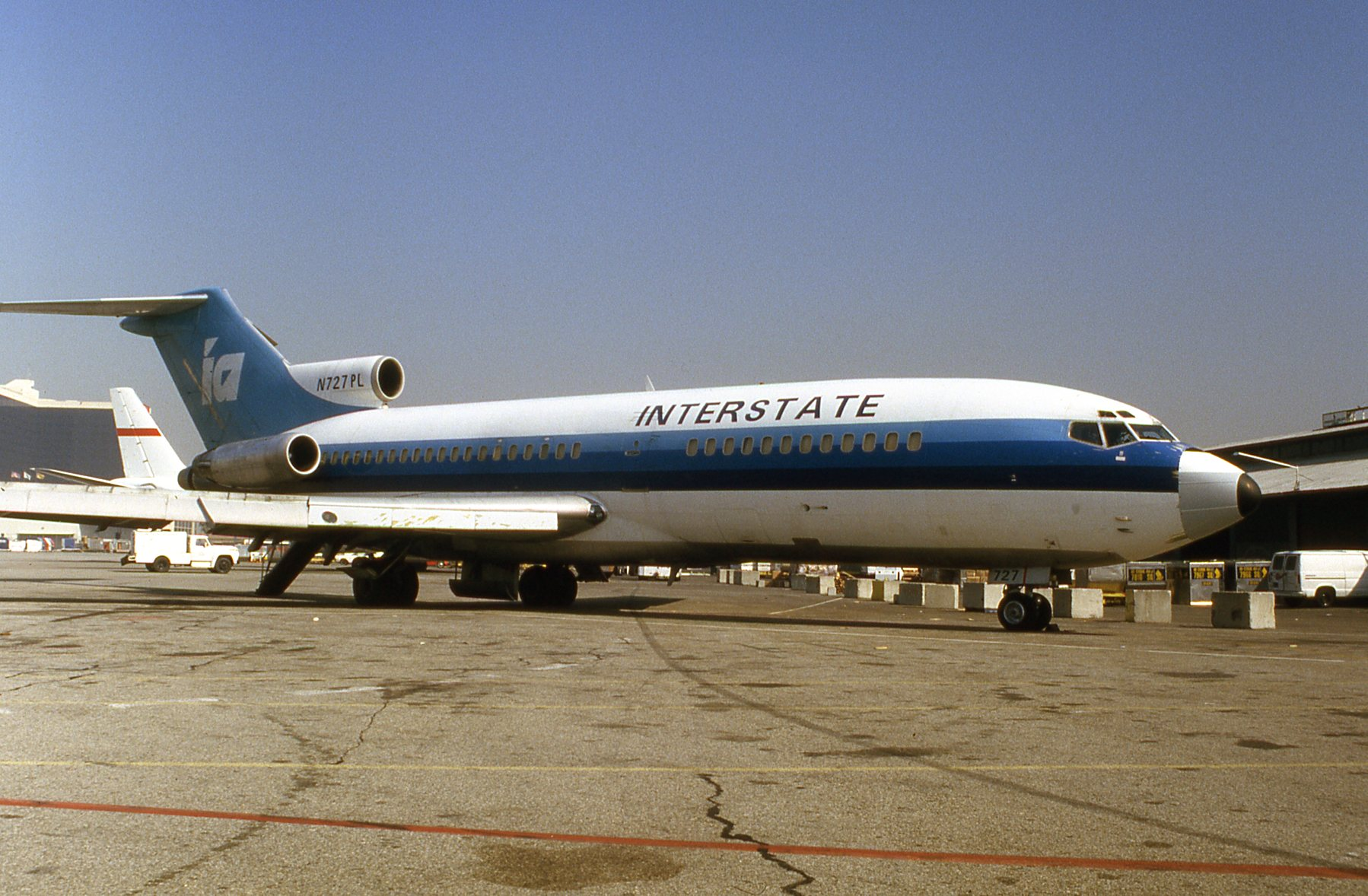
Interstate 727 in Los Angeles 1985

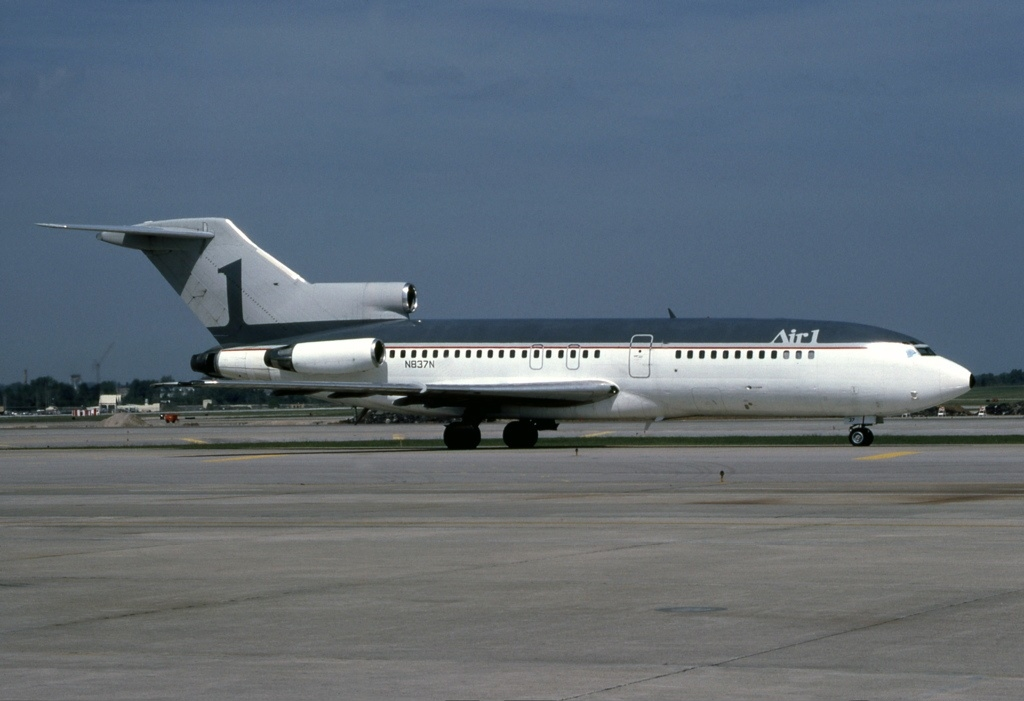
Air One 727 St Louis 1984

Air Transport International, Inc. (ATI) is an airline based in Wilmington, Ohio, United States. It operates worldwide cargo and passenger charter service for the express package industry (notably, Amazon) and freight forwarders, as well as for the United States Department of Defense. It also wet-leases aircraft. Its main base is Wilmington. It is part of the Air Transport Services Group (ATSG).

ATI's origins are complex. It is often (including on its own website) identified with Interstate Airlines, a 1980s cargo airline, but while there was a connection there was no corporate continuity. Interstate liquidated in the late 1980s after a severe business reverse and its owner bought ATI, a separate carrier, and operated it from former Interstate facilities with former Interstate aircraft. In 1994, ATI merged with another cargo airline, International Cargo Xpress dba International Charter Xpress (ICX). ATI then went through 1998 Chapter 11 bankruptcy and changed owners at least thrice, including once-prominent air freight company BAX Global and since 2007, ATSG. In 2013, ATSG merged a sister airline, Capital Cargo International Airlines, into ATI.

== History ==
=== Air Traffic Services Corp. and Interstate ===
Two organizations competed to fly parts for Big Three automakers after Universal Airlines collapsed in May 1972: Zantop International Airlines (ZIA) and Air Traffic Services Corp. (ATSC; not to be confused with ATI's current owner, ATSG). Founded by David M. Clark (previously at Universal and predecessor Zantop Air Transport) and like ZIA, headquartered at Willow Run Airport near Detroit, ATSC hired airlines to fly parts and provided aircraft to some of those airlines through a related company, Plymouth Leasing. ATSC gave significant business to nascent carriers Evergreen International Airlines and Rosenbalm Aviation in the mid-1970s. ATSC gained national attention in 1979 when reporting showed that in the early 1970s ATSC contracted with Intermountain Aviation and Southern Air Transport, later revealed to be Central Intelligence Agency (CIA) controlled. Clark said he didn't know, but he also said the CIA offered him a job. ATSC's revenue was reported at $50 million/year (over $220 million in 2026 terms).

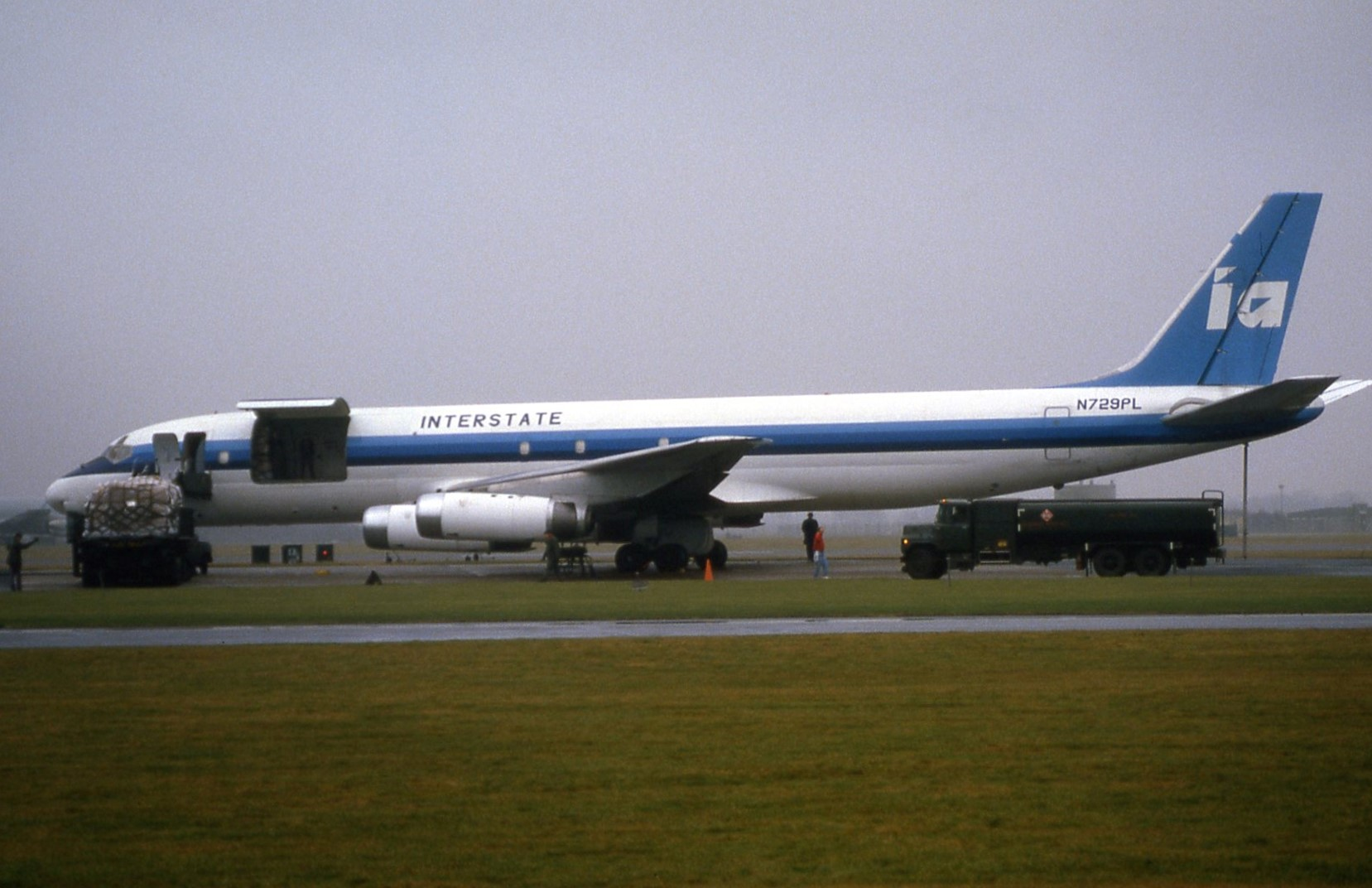
Interstate DC-8-62F N729PL at RAF Mildenhall 1987

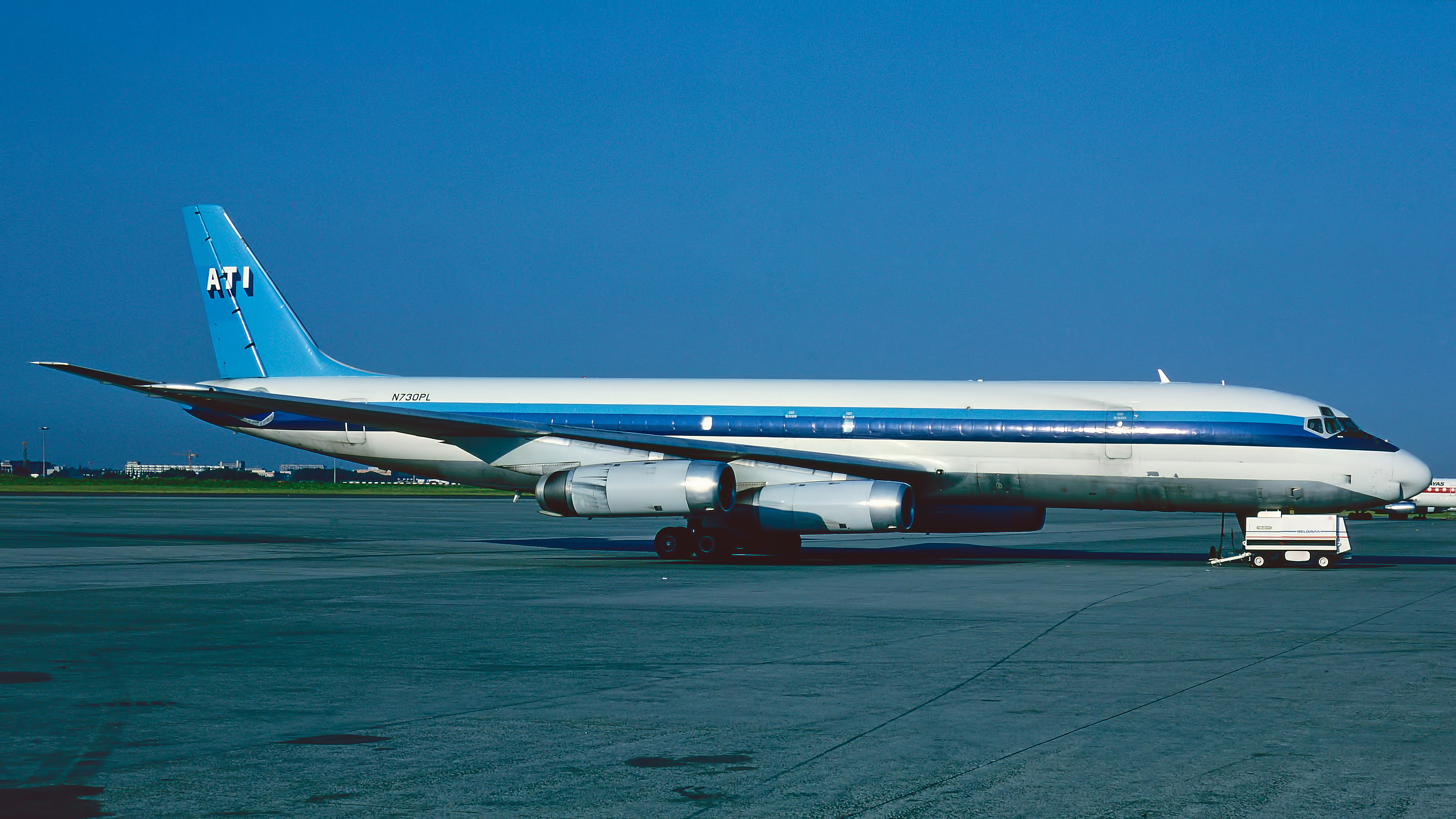
N729PL (prior picture) and N730PL (at Brussels 1990) both moved from Interstate to ATI, with obvious livery similarities. N730PL crashed at JFK in 1991 (see Accidents and Incidents) at which time the owner was David M Clark

The 1977 Air Cargo Deregulation Act freed the US domestic air freight market. In 1978, ATSC founded Interstate Airlines (originally U.S. Airways), operational by year-end 1979. Interstate was originally a Convair 580 operator (see Fleet), the aircraft owned by Plymouth Leasing or ATSC, several flying for each of Purolator and Emery. It graduated to Lockheed Electras, Boeing 727s and Douglas DC-8s (see Fleet). The airline was known for flying thoroughbreds, including Secretariat. In 1983, its main commercial customer was Emery and it had 13 727s based in Dayton. The airline also operated for the USAF Logair program. By 1987, Interstate was one of four main contractors for United Parcel Service (UPS), flying packages on UPS-owned aircraft along with Evergreen, Orion and Ryan. ATSC and Interstate moved headquarters from Michigan to Little Rock, Arkansas in 1983 but in 1987, UPS's Louisville hub was Interstate's main base with about 300 (out of about 400) employees based there.

=== Air One and liquidation ===
Interstate was interested in passenger service, at one time hiring Mark G. Morris as a consultant on a passenger project. Morris later launched St. Louis-based Air One, which operated all first-class 727s (see picture) from April 1983 to an October 1984 bankruptcy. In 1986 ATSC hired Morris and in February 1987 Interstate merged with the remains of Air One. But in August 1987, UPS announced it would directly operate its aircraft by the end of 1988. This stripped Interstate of 80% of its business and stranded assets like a Little Rock training center, leading Interstate to declare bankruptcy in October. Starting 1988, Interstate liquidated under Chapter 11.

=== Transition to Air Transport International and ICX ===
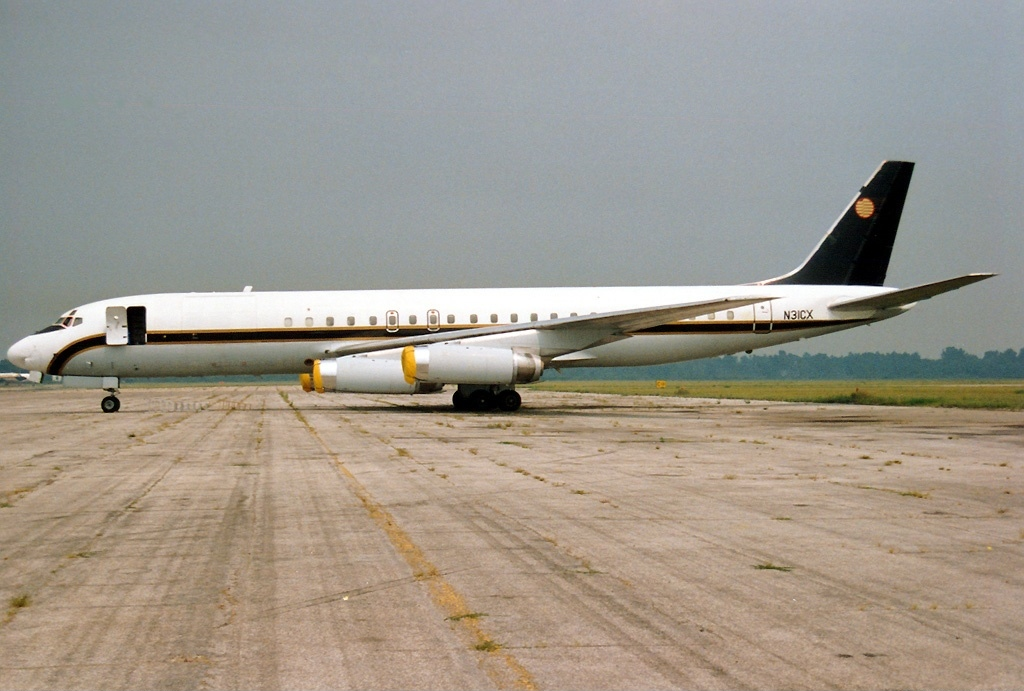
ICX DC-8-62F Ypsilanti, Michigan 1993

Air Transport International first certificated in 1981; Duane Zantop (majority owner of ZIA) owned 50%. ATI operated intermittently; the Civil Aeronautics Board said it was not operating as of March 1983, but Federal Aviation Administration (FAA) reports show ATI operations in 1984. It certificated a second time in 1986–1987. ATSC's owner bought 50% of ATI in 1988 and operated it from Interstate's former facilities in Little Rock. But Interstate dissolved, it did not merge into ATI. Of the initial ATI fleet, three of four DC-8s were ex-Interstate. As nearby photos show, the initial ATI livery was derivative of the Interstate livery.

International Cargo Xpress dba International Charter Xpress (ICX) (ICAO: ICX, call sign: INTEX), certificated in 1992, was another DC-8 operator under common ownership with ATI. Incorporation records show ATI and ICX merged in November 1994. Three months later, ATI suffered the destruction of its third DC-8 within four years, two of the three crashes fatal (see Accidents and Investigations). The National Transportation Safety Board investigation called out the company and the FAA for insufficient oversight, noting FAA inspector's supervision was inadequate and that he was consumed with the administration of merging the two certificates.

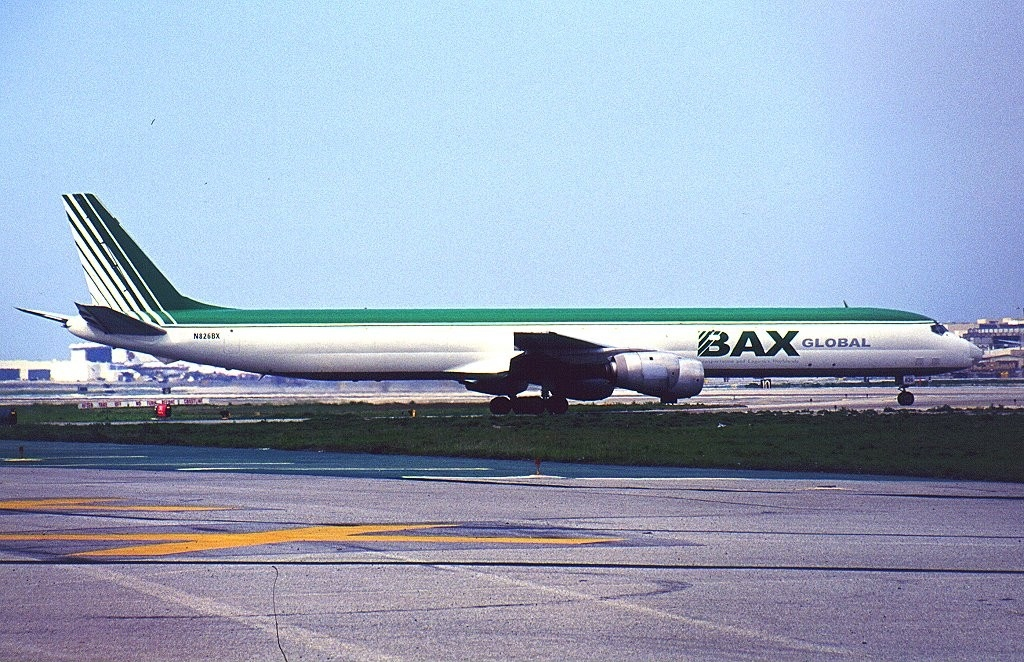
Douglas DC-8-71F operating for BAX Global, Los Angeles 2001

=== Chapter 11 and BAX Global ===
David Clark remained owner of ATI in 1995. However, by 1997 the airline was in financial trouble and up for sale. 50% of the airline's 1997 revenue was military. The winning bidder was freight company BAX Global, for which, in 1998, ATI was flying 12 aircraft. BAX had earlier decided to start its own carrier, but was able to buy ATI out of Chapter 11 for $27 million ($54 million in 2026 terms) in April 1998. BAX replaced senior management.

In 2006, BAX Global was sold, as part of which, ATI was sold in 2006 to Cargo Holdings International (CHI), for a "nominal consideration." It had 495 employees.

Former logo until 2021.

=== ATSG ===
Cargo Aircraft Management was the lead customer for the Boeing 767 freighter conversion program. In the 12 months after ATI's sale by Brinks to CHI, worldwide airline profits fell significantly; however, ATI continued to negate this trend. Delivery of fully modernized and fuel efficient Boeing 767 was on track for June 2008.

On November 2, 2007, Cargo Holdings International, the parent company of ATI entered into an agreement to be acquired by Wilmington, OH-based ABX Holdings. The company along with sister company Capital Cargo International Airlines were run as separate companies under the Air Transport Services Group umbrella.

In March 2013 Capital Cargo merged with Air Transport.

In March 2016, Amazon.com announced that it would be using ATI to provide transport services for the Amazon Prime network. The deal under ATI's parent company will result in an increase in aircraft, frequencies, and jobs for the airline. ATI has since become the primary carrier serving Amazon Air. ATI currently also operates military charters for the U.S. Transportation Command.

== Fleet ==
=== Current fleet ===
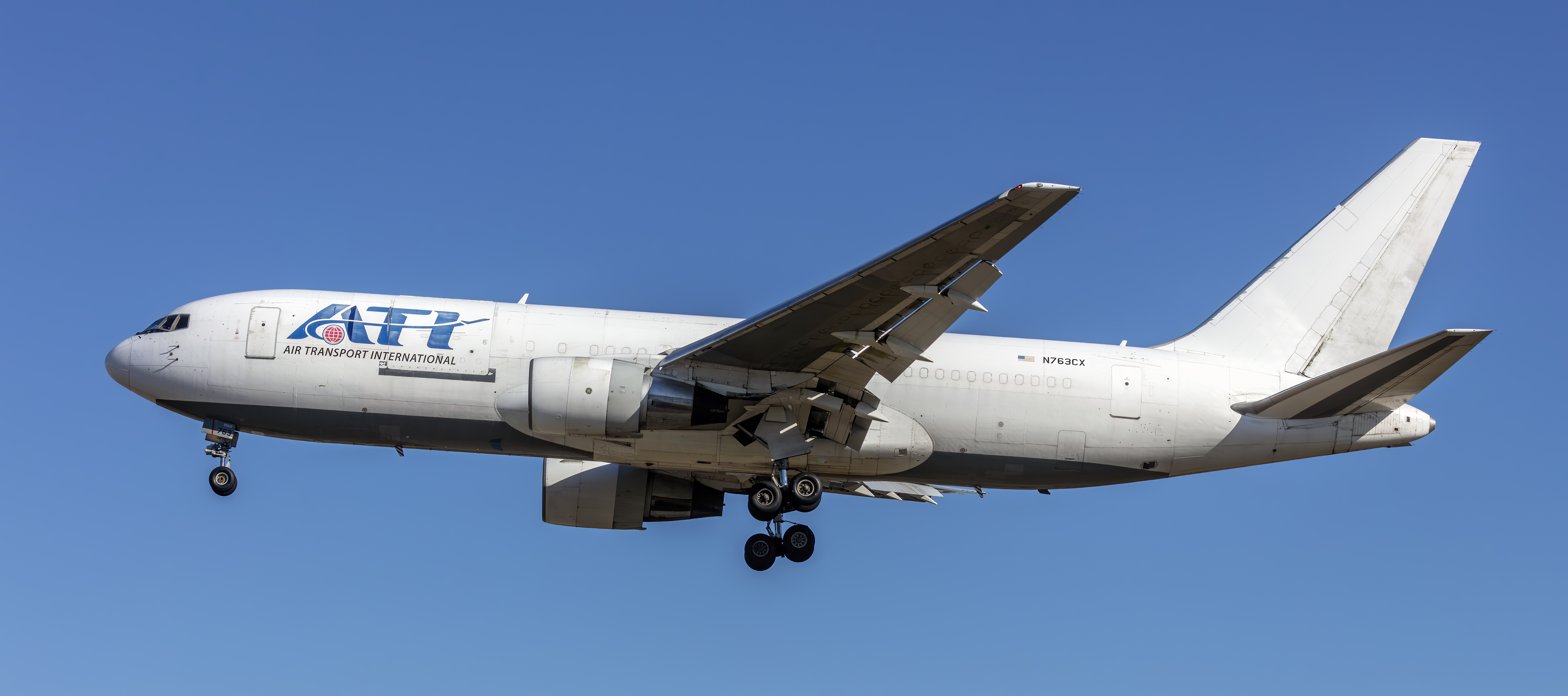
ATI Boeing 767-200BDSF

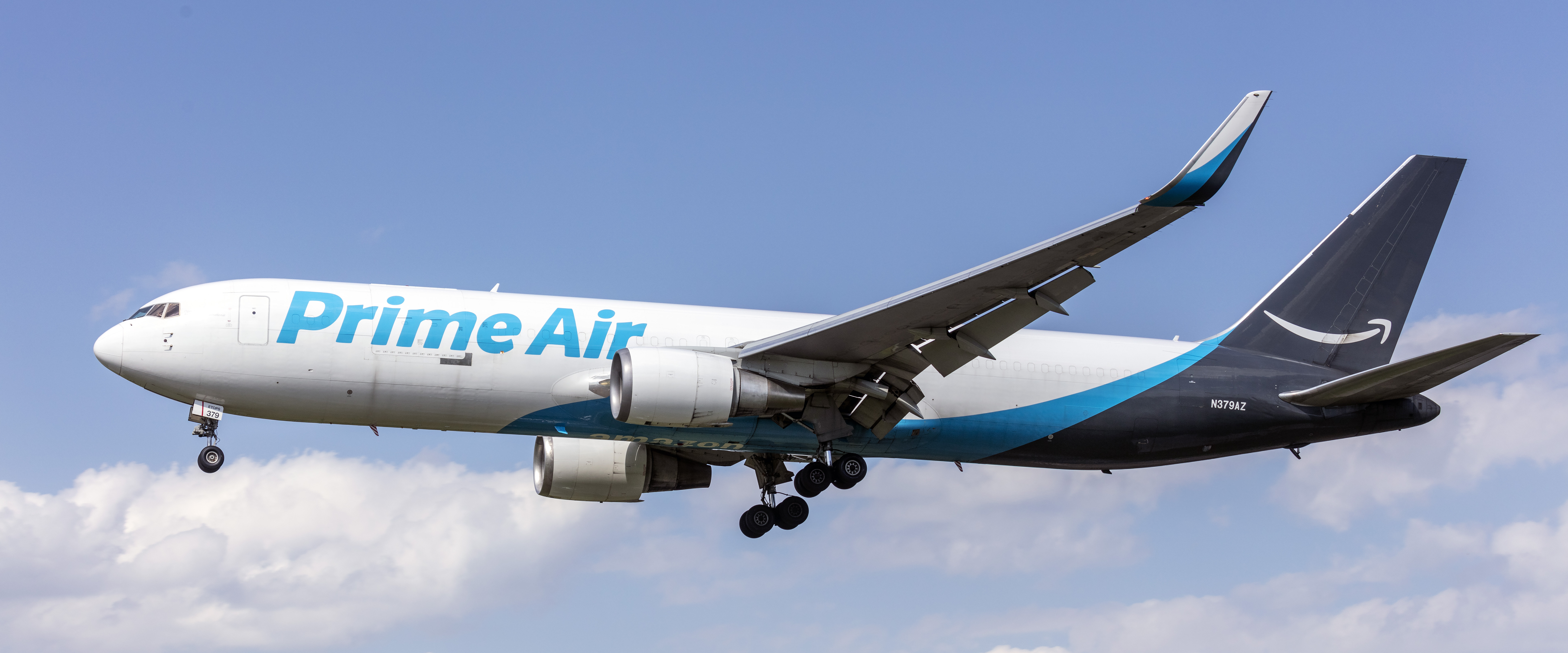
ATI Boeing 767-300BDSF operated for Amazon Air

As of August 2025, Air Transport International operates an all Boeing fleet:

Air Transport International fleet
Aircraft	In service
Boeing 757-200C	4
Boeing 767-200BDSF	1
Boeing 767-200SF	1
Boeing 767-300ER(BCF)	3
Boeing 767-300ER(BDSF)	40
Total	49

=== Former fleet ===
31 March 1981, AvData shows Interstate with 11 Convair 580s.

1982–83 edition of The Airline Hand Book (published Oct 1982) shows Air Transport International with:

- 1 Douglas DC-8-33F
- 1 Douglas DC-8-55F

1987-88 World Airline Fleets (copyright 1987) shows Interstate Airlines with (client shown in parentheses):

- 6 Boeing 727-100C (UPS)
- 1 Boeing 727-100C (DHL)
- 3 Douglas DC-8-62
- 2 Douglas DC-8-63F (UPS)
- 1 Douglas DC-8-73F (UPS)
- 3 Lockheed L-188C Electra

JP fleets 1989 (copyright May 1989) shows Air Transport International with (client shown in parentheses):

- 4 DC-8-62F
- 1 Learjet 35A

In January 1998, Aviation Week and Space Technology reported ATI had the following fleet:

- 1 Douglas DC-8-61F
- 7 Douglas DC-8-62C
- 1 Douglas DC-8-62F
- 6 Douglas DC-8-63F
- 11 Douglas DC-8-71F

== Accidents and incidents ==
- 12 March 1991: On takeoff from New York Kennedy Airport on a flight to Brussels, ATI Douglas DC-8-62F N730PL (picture of this aircraft nearby) overran the runway, leading to collapse of the landing gear, separation of all four engines and destruction of the aircraft by fire. The flight engineer configured the aircraft and calculated takeoff speeds using a weight 100,000 lbs under actual. The first officer and captain failed to catch the mistake, resulting in a failed takeoff at a speed far under that required. The company was also cited for assigning technically qualified but low-experience crew together. All on board survived, the crew of three unharmed, the two passengers with minor injuries.
- 15 February 1992: The crew lost control of ATI Flight 805, Douglas DC-8-63F N794AL at Toledo, Ohio on a flight from Seattle resulting in the crash of the aircraft 3 miles from the airport and the death of all three crew and the one passenger on board. Investigation said the crew was unable to recover when aircraft entered an unusual attitude due to the disorientation of the captain, possibly due to a physiological issue and/or a broken aircraft instrument. The captain took control of the aircraft after the second missed approach by the first officer.
- 16 February 1995: Crew was performing, at night, a second attempt at a takeoff of a three (out of four) engine ferry flight of Douglas DC-8-63F N782AL from Kansas City to Springfield, Massachusetts when it lost control, but attempted to lift off at below the computed takeoff speed, resulting in further loss of control and crash, killing all three crew members. Investigation noted the crew was relatively inexperienced, poorly rested and poorly prepared for such a flight, noting that airlines flying the same aircraft generally restricted such flights to experienced crews, during daytime. The airline and the FAA were cited for insufficient oversight.

=== Animal transport negligence ===
In December 2014, the United States Department of Agriculture cited Air Transport International for failing to provide food and water for over 24 hours to 1,148 crab-eating macaques shipped from Guangzhou to Houston, in violation of the Animal Welfare Act. This was the second time ATI had "run afoul of the law" for transporting animals from China for laboratory research.

== See also ==
- List of airlines of the United States
- UPS Airlines
- BAX Global
- Amazon Air
- Universal Airlines
- Zantop International Airlines
