= List of airlines of the United States =

This is a list of airlines that have an air operator's certificate issued by the Federal Aviation Administration of the United States.

Note: Destinations in bold indicate primary hubs, those in italic indicate secondary hubs, and those with regular font indicate focus cities. For legacy carriers American, Delta, and United, the most strategic/well connected hubs are shown as primary hubs.

== Passenger airlines ==
=== Mainline ===
Airline	Image	IATA	ICAO	Callsign	Primary hubs, secondary hubs	Founded	Notes
Alaska Airlines		AS	ASA	ALASKA	**Seattle/Tacoma**; **Honolulu**; Anchorage; Los Angeles; Portland (OR); San Diego; San Francisco	1932	Founded as McGee Airways, commenced operations in 1944 as Alaska Airlines. Hawaiian Airlines merged into Alaska Air Group in 2024, though the two airlines remain separately branded.
Allegiant Air		G4	AAY	ALLEGIANT	**Las Vegas**; Allentown; Appleton; Asheville; Cincinnati; Destin/Fort Walton Beach; Des Moines; Flint; Fort Lauderdale; Grand Rapids; Indianapolis; Knoxville; Nashville; Orlando/Sanford; Phoenix/Mesa; Pittsburgh; Provo; Punta Gorda; Sarasota; St. Petersburg/Clearwater	1997	Founded as WestJet Express, began operations in 1998 as Allegiant Air.
American Airlines		AA	AAL	AMERICAN	**Charlotte**; **Chicago–O'Hare**; **Dallas/Fort Worth**; **Miami**; **Philadelphia**; **Phoenix–Sky Harbor**; Los Angeles; New York–JFK; New York–LaGuardia; Washington–National	1926	Founded as American Airways, commenced operations in 1936 as American Air Lines. Largest airline in the world by revenue and scheduled passenger miles flown (per year) in 2025.
Avelo Airlines		XP	VXP	AVELO	**New Haven**; Charlotte/Concord; Lakeland; Wilmington (DE)	1987	Founded as Casino Express Airlines, commenced operations in 1989.
Breeze Airways		MX	MXY	MOXY	**Charleston (SC)**; Akron/Canton; Fort Myers; Hartford; New Orleans; Norfolk; Orlando; Providence; Provo; Raleigh/Durham; Tampa; Vero Beach	2018	Founded as Moxy Airways, renamed due to trademark issues.
Delta Air Lines		DL	DAL	DELTA	**Atlanta**; **Detroit**; **Minneapolis/St. Paul**; **New York–JFK**; **Salt Lake City**; Boston; Los Angeles; New York–LaGuardia; Seattle/Tacoma	1924	Founded as Huff Daland Dusters, commenced operations in 1929 as Delta Air Service.
Frontier Airlines		F9	FFT	FRONTIER FLIGHT	**Denver**; Atlanta; Chicago–O'Hare; Cincinnati; Cleveland; Las Vegas; Miami; Orlando; Philadelphia	1994	
Hawaiian Airlines		AS	ASA	ALASKA	**Honolulu**; Kahului	1929	Merged into Alaska Air Group in 2024, though the two airlines remain separately branded.
JetBlue		B6	JBU	JETBLUE	**New York–JFK**; Boston; Los Angeles; Fort Lauderdale; Orlando	1998	Founded as New Air, commenced operations in 2000 as JetBlue Airways.
Southwest Airlines		WN	SWA	SOUTHWEST	**Dallas–Love**; Atlanta; Baltimore; Chicago–Midway; Denver; Houston–Hobby; Las Vegas; Los Angeles; Oakland; Orlando; Phoenix–Sky Harbor; Nashville	1967	Founded as Air Southwest, commenced operations in 1971 as Southwest Airlines; largest airline in the world by number of passengers served per year.
Sun Country Airlines		SY	SCX	SUN COUNTRY	**Minneapolis/St. Paul**; Dallas/Fort Worth; Las Vegas	1982	Commenced operations in 1983. Operates some Amazon Air cargo flights.
United Airlines		UA	UAL	UNITED	**Chicago–O'Hare**; **Denver**; **Houston–Intercontinental**; **Newark**; **San Francisco**; **Washington–Dulles**; Guam; Los Angeles	1926	Founded as Varney Air Lines, commenced operations in 1931 as United Air Lines.

=== Regional ===
Airline	Image	IATA	ICAO	Callsign	Primary hubs, secondary hubs	Founded	Notes
Air Wisconsin		ZW	AWI	WISCONSIN	Chicago–O'Hare; Washington–Dulles	1965	
Cape Air		9K	KAP	CAIR	**Hyannis**; Billings; Boston; Nantucket; St. Louis; San Juan; Albany; Martha's Vineyard	1988	
CommuteAir		C5	UCA	COMMUTAIR	**Denver**; **Newark**; **Washington–Dulles**	1989	Operates as United Express.
Contour Airlines		LF	VTE	VOLUNTEER	**Smyrna (TN)**	1982	
Endeavor Air		9E	EDV	ENDEAVOR	**Minneapolis/St. Paul**; Atlanta; Cincinnati; Detroit; New York–JFK; New York–LaGuardia; Raleigh/Durham	1985	Founded as Express Airlines I. Operates as Delta Connection.
Envoy Air		MQ	ENY	ENVOY	**Dallas/Fort Worth**; **Chicago-O'Hare**; **Miami**; **Phoenix–Sky Harbor**	1984	Founded as American Eagle Airlines. Operates as American Eagle.
GoJet Airlines		G7	GJS	LINDBERGH	**Chicago–O'Hare**; **Denver**	2004	Commenced operations in 2005. Operates as United Express.
Horizon Air		QX	QXE	HORIZON	**Seattle/Tacoma**; Portland (OR)	1981	Operates as Alaska Airlines.
Mesa Airlines		YV	ASH	AIR SHUTTLE	**Houston–Intercontinental**; **Washington–Dulles**	1980	Founded as Mesa Air Shuttle. All but one aircraft operate as United Express.
Piedmont Airlines		PT	PDT	PIEDMONT	**Charlotte**; Philadelphia; Washington–National	1961	Founded as Henson Aviation and commenced operations in 1962. Operates as American Eagle.
Prinair		PQ	PRU	COLORBIRD	**Ponce**; **Aguadilla**	2017	
PSA Airlines		OH	JIA	BLUE STREAK	**Charlotte**; Philadelphia; Washington–National	1979	Founded as Vee Neal Airlines. Operates as American Eagle.
Republic Airways		YX	RPA	BRICKYARD	**Indianapolis**; Columbus (OH); New York–LaGuardia; As American Eagle: Kansas City; Miami; Philadelphia; Pittsburgh; Washington–National; As United Express: Chicago–O'Hare; Kansas City; Newark; Pittsburgh; Washington–National; As Delta Connection: Chicago–O'Hare	1998	Commenced operations in 2005. Operates as American Eagle, United Express and Delta Connection.
SkyWest Airlines		OO	SKW	SKYWEST	As Delta Connection: **Atlanta**; **Detroit**; **Minneapolis/St. Paul**; **Salt Lake City**; Boise; Colorado Springs; Los Angeles; Seattle/Tacoma; As United Express: **Chicago-O'Hare**; **Denver**; **Houston–Intercontinental**; **San Francisco**; Boise; Colorado Springs; Los Angeles; As American Eagle: **Dallas/Ft. Worth**; **Chicago–O'Hare**; **Phoenix–Sky Harbor**; Los Angeles; As Alaska Airlines: **Seattle/Tacoma**; Portland (OR)	1972	Operates as Delta Connection, United Express, American Eagle and Alaska Airlines.

=== Commuter ===
Airline	Image	IATA	ICAO	Callsign	Primary hubs, secondary hubs	Founded	Notes
Advanced Air		AN	WSN	WINGSPAN	**Hawthorne**	2005	Has EAS contract to serve Silver City.
Aztec Airways					Fort Lauderdale	1998	
Bering Air		8E	BRG	BERING AIR	**Nome**; Kotzebue; Unalakleet	1979	
Boutique Air		4B	BTQ	BOUTIQUE	**Dallas/Ft. Worth**; Denver; Phoenix–Sky Harbor	2007	
Everts Air		5V	VTS	EVERTS	**Fairbanks**; Anchorage	1978	Founded as Tatonduk Flying Service.
Gem Air		S6	MBI		**Salmon**	2014	
Grand Canyon Airlines		YR	CVU	CANYON VIEW	**Boulder City**; Grand Canyon; Page	1927	Founded as Scenic Airways.
Grand Canyon Scenic Airlines		YR	SCE	SCENIC	**Grand Canyon**	1967	Founded as Scenic Airlines.
Grant Aviation		GV	GUN	HOOT	**Anchorage**; Bethel; Cold Bay; Dillingham; Emmonak; Kenai; King Salmon; Unalaska	1971	Founded as Delta Air Services.
Griffing Flying Service					**Port Clinton**	1937	
Island Airways					**Charlevoix**	1945	Founded as McPhillips Flying Service.
JSX		XE	JSX	BIGSTRIPE	Burbank; Dallas–Love; Las Vegas; Miami–Opa Locka; Scottsdale	2016	Operator of Taos Air flights from 2022.
Kenmore Air		M5	KEN	KENMORE	**Kenmore**; Seattle–Lake Union; Seattle–Boeing	1946	Founded as Mines Collins Munro.
Key Lime Air		KG	LYM	KEY LIME	**Denver–Centennial**; Denver; Denver–Rocky Mountain; Grand Junction	1997	Operates as Denver Air Connection.
Mokulele Airlines		MW	MHO	MAHALO	**Kona**; Kahului	1994	Founded as Mokulele Flight Service.
New England Airlines		EJ	NEA	NEW ENGLAND	**Westerly**	1970	
Penobscot Island Air					**Rockland**	2004	
Reliant Air			RLI	RELIANT	**Danbury**	1988	
San Juan Airlines			SJN	SKYFERRY	**Bellingham**	2002	
Servant Air		8D		SERVANT	**Kodiak**	2003	
Southern Airways Express		9X	FDY	FRIENDLY	**Memphis**; Destin; Pittsburgh; Washington–Dulles	2013	
Star Marianas Air		S2			**Tinian (CNMI)**	2008	
Surf Air		UF	URF	SURFAIR	**Hawthorne**; Oakland; San Carlos; Santa Barbara; Truckee	2012	
Taquan Air		K3	TQN	TAQUAN	**Ketchikan Harbor**	1977	
Tradewind Aviation		TJ	GPD	GOODSPEED	**Oxford (CT)**; San Juan; White Plains	2001	
Utah Airways					**Ogden**	2015	
Warbelow's Air Ventures		4W	WAV	WARBELOW	**Fairbanks**	1958	
Wright Air Service		8V	WRF	WRIGHT FLYER	**Fairbanks**	1966	

=== Charter ===
Airline	Image	IATA	ICAO	Callsign	Primary hubs, secondary hubs	Founded	Notes
Air Charter Bahamas							
Air Charter Express			FRG	FREIGHT RUNNERS	Milwaukee	1985	
Air Flight Charters			FLL		**Fort Lauderdale**	1987	
Airshare			XSR	AIRSHARE		2000	Founded as Executive Flight Services.
Berry Aviation			BYA	BERRY	**San Marcos**	1983	
Bighorn Airways			BHR	BIGHORN AIR	**Sheridan**	1947	
Choice Airways			CSX	CHOICE AIR	**Fort Lauderdale–Executive**	2009	
Eastern Air Express			BBQ	EASTERN EXPRESS	**Kansas City**; **Miami**	2013	Founded as ATX Air Services.
Eastern Airlines		2D	EAL	EASTERN	**Kansas City**	2010	Founded as Dynamic Airways.
ExcelAire			XLS	EXCELAIRE	**Long Island/Islip**	1993	
Fly The Whale		2NQ	FWH		**New Haven (CT)**	2006	
Global Crossing Airlines		G6	GXA	GEMINI	**Atlantic City**; **Las Vegas**; **Miami**	2018	
Gryphon Airlines		Y3	VOS		**Kuwait City**		
Havana Air					**Miami**	2007	Virtual airline.
IBC Airways		II	CSQ	CHASQUI	**Fort Lauderdale**	1991	
L-3 Flight International Aviation			RTD	RIPTIDE	**Newport News**	1972	
Liberty Jet Management			LRT	LIBERTY JET	**Long Island/Islip**	2006	
NetJets		1I	EJA	EXECJET	Columbus	1964	Founded as Executive Jets Aviation.
Omni Air International		X9	OAE	OMNI-EXPRESS	**Tulsa**	1993	
Omni Air Transport			DRL	DRILLER	Tulsa		
Pacific Coast Jet			PXT	PACK COAST		2006	
Pentastar Aviation			DCX	TANGO	**Waterford**	1964	Founded as Chrysler Air Transportation.
Phoenix Air		PH	PHA	GRAY BIRD	**Cartersville**	1978	
PlaneSense			CNS	CHRONOS	**Portsmouth (NH)**	1992	
Presidential Airways			PRD	PRESIDENTIAL	**Melbourne/Orlando**		
Sierra Pacific Airlines		SI	SPA	SIERRA PACIFIC	**Tucson**	1970	Commenced operations in 1971.
Skymax			SMX	SKYMAX	**Ft. Lauderdale–Executive**	1997	Commenced operations in 2013.
Stampede Aviation					**Healy/Denali NP**	2011	
Superior Air Charter			RSP	REDSTRIPE		2006	
Superior Aviation		SO	HKA	SPEND AIR	**Lansing**	1979	
Talkeetna Air Taxi					**Talkeetna**	1947	Founded as Talkeetna Flying Service.
Tropic Ocean Airways		TI	FTO	WAGNER	**Fort Lauderdale**	2009	
World Atlantic Airlines		WL	WAL	WORLD ATLANTIC	**Miami**	2002	Founded as Caribbean Sun Airlines.
XOJET Aviation LLC			XOJ	XOJET	**Sacramento–McClellan**	2006	

== Cargo airlines ==
Airline	Image	IATA	ICAO	Callsign	Primary hubs, secondary hubs	Founded	Notes
7Air Cargo		R7	TXG	CARGO BOX	**Miami**	2020	
21 Air		2I	CSB	CARGO SOUTH	**Greensboro**	2014	
ABX Air		GB	ABX	ABEX	**Wilmington (OH)**; Cincinnati; Miami	1980	Founded as Midwest Air Charter. Operates some Amazon Air flights.
Air Cargo Carriers		2Q	SNC	NIGHT CARGO	**Milwaukee**; Cincinnati	1986	Commenced operations in 1980.
AirNet Express			USC	STAR CHECK	**Columbus–Rickenbacker**	1974	Founded as Financial Air Express.
Air Transport International		8C	ATN	AIR TRANSPORT	**Wilmington (OH)**; Cincinnati	1978	Founded as US Airways and commenced operations in 1980. Operates some Amazon Air flights.
Alaska Central Express		KO	AER	ACE AIR	**Anchorage**	1996	
Aloha Air Cargo		KH	AAH	ALOHA	**Honolulu**	1946	Founded as Trans-Pacific Airlines. Separated from now-defunct Aloha Airlines in 2008.
Alpine Air Express		5A	AIP	ALPINE AIR	**Provo**; Billings; Sioux Falls	1971	
Amazon Air		AFW	KAFW	AMAZON AIR	**Fort Worth–Alliance**; Cincinnati; Leipzig/Halle; San Bernardino; Ontario; Wilmington (OH)	2015	Formerly Amazon Prime Air.
Ameriflight		A8	AMF	AMFLIGHT	**Dallas/Fort Worth**; Burbank	1968	Founded as California Air Charter.
Amerijet International		M6	AJT	AMERIJET	**Miami**; Port of Spain	1974	
Ameristar Jet Charter		7Z	AJI	AMERISTAR	**Dallas–Addison**; El Paso; Willow Run	2000	
Asia Pacific Airlines		P9	MGE	MAGELLAN	**Guam**; Honolulu	1998	
Atlas Air		5Y	GTI	GIANT	**New York–JFK**; Anchorage; Cincinnati; Houston–Intercontinental; Huntsville; Los Angeles; Miami	1992	Commenced operations in 1993. Operates some Amazon Air flights.
Bemidji Airlines		CH	BMJ	BEMIDJI	**Bemidji**; Minneapolis/St. Paul	1946	Commenced operations in 1947.
Castle Aviation			CSJ	CASTLE	**Akron/Canton**	1986	
Corporate Air			CPT	AIRSPUR	**Billings**	1981	
CSA Air	CSA Air photo added.		IRO	IRON AIR	**Iron Mountain**	1998	
DesertAir Alaska							
Empire Airlines		EM	CFS	EMPIRE	**Coeur d'Alene**; Spokane	1977	
Everts Air Cargo		5V	VTS	EVERTS	**Fairbanks**; Anchorage	1995	
FedEx Express		FX	FDX	FEDEX	**Memphis**; Anchorage; Cologne/Bonn; Dubai; Fort Worth–Alliance; Greensboro; Guangzhou; Indianapolis; Miami; Milan–Malpensa; Newark; Oakland; Osaka–Kansai; Paris–CDG; Seoul–Incheon; Toronto–Pearson	1971	Founded as Federal Express and commenced operations in 1973.
Florida Air Cargo							
Freight Runners Express			FRG	FREIGHT RUNNERS	**Milwaukee**	1985	
IFL Group		IF	IFL	EIFFEL	**Waterford**; Miami	1983	Founded as Air Contract Cargo.
Kalitta Air		K4	CKS	CONNIE	**Ypsilanti**; Anchorage; Bahrain; Cincinnati; Hong Kong; New York–JFK	1967	Founded as American International Airways.
Kalitta Charters II		CB	KFS	KALITTA	**Ypsilanti**		
Kamaka Air					**Honolulu**	1993	
Lynden Air Cargo		L2	LYC	LYNDEN	**Anchorage**	1995	
Martinaire			MRA	MARTEX	**Addison**	1978	
Merlin Airways			MEI	AVALON	**Billings**; Miami; San Juan	1983	
Mountain Air Cargo		C2	MTN	MOUNTAIN	**Kinston**	1974	
National Airlines		N8	NCR	NATIONAL CARGO	**Orlando/Sanford**	1985	Commenced operations in 1986.
Northern Air Cargo		NC	NAC	YUKON	**Anchorage**; Miami	1956	
Polar Air Cargo		PO	PAC	POLAR	**Anchorage**; Cincinnati; Hong Kong; Honolulu; Los Angeles; Leipzig/Halle; Seoul–Incheon; Shanghai–Pudong; Sharjah; Sydney	1993	
Royal Air Freight			RAX	AIR ROYAL	**Waterford**	1961	
Ryan Air Services		7S	RYA	RYAN AIR	**Anchorage**; Aniak; Bethel; Emmonak; Kotzebue; Nome; St. Mary's; Unalakleet	1953	Founded as Unalakleet Air Taxi.
Sky Lease Cargo		GG	KYE	SKY CUBE	**Miami**	1969	Founded as Wrangler Aviation and commenced operations in 1973.
Skyway Enterprises		KI	SKZ	SKYWAY-INC		1981	Commenced operations in 1983.
StratAir					**Miami**	2018	Virtual airline on behalf of Northern Air Cargo.
Trans Executive Airlines		KH	MUI	RHOADES EXPRESS	**Honolulu**	1982	
UPS Airlines		5X	UPS	UPS	**Louisville**; Chicago/Rockford; Cologne/Bonn; Columbia (SC); Dallas/Fort Worth; Hamilton; Hong Kong; Kuala Lumpur; Miami; Ontario; Philadelphia; Shanghai–Pudong; Shenzhen	1988	
USA Jet Airlines		UJ	JUS	JET USA	**Ypsilanti**; Laredo	1994	
West Air			PCM	PAC VALLEY	Las Vegas; Oakland; Ontario; Sacramento; San Diego	1988	
Western Global Airlines		KD	WGN	WESTERN GLOBAL	**Fort Myers**; Anchorage; Hong Kong; Liege; Los Angeles; Miami; Seoul–Incheon	2013	
Wiggins Airways		WG	WIG	WIGGINS AIRWAYS	**Manchester**	1929	

== Air ambulances ==
Airline	Image	IATA	ICAO	Callsign	Primary hubs, secondary hubs	Founded	Notes
AirMed International					**Birmingham**	1987	Founded as MEDjet International.
Hatzalair					Bethel (NY)		
Air Methods					**Denver–Centennial**	1980	
Critical Air Medicine						1984	
Lifestar							
Life Lion							

== State-run airlines ==
Airline	Image	IATA	ICAO	Callsign	Primary hubs, secondary hubs	Founded	Notes
Comco						2002	
Janet			WWW	JANET	**Las Vegas**	1972	
Justice Prisoner Air Transportation System			JUD	JUSTICE	**Oklahoma City**	1980	Commenced operations in 1995.

== See also ==
- Lists of airlines
- List of airlines of Puerto Rico
- List of airports in the United States
- List of largest airlines in North America
- List of defunct airlines of the United States
- Major airlines of the United States
- Proposed airlines of the United States
