= IAero Airways =

Charter airline of the United States (1997–2024)

iAero Airways
IATA	ICAO	Call sign
WQ	SWQ	SWIFTFLIGHT
- Founded: 1997 (as Swift Air)
- Commenced operations: January 1, 2020 (as IAero Airways)
- Ceased operations: April 6, 2024
- AOC #: I5EA212N
- Hubs: Miami; Phoenix/Mesa
- Fleet size: 10
- Parent company: iAero Group
- Headquarters: Greensboro, North Carolina, United States
- Key people: Timothy Rainey (President); William Garrett (CFO); Jon Corbi (CRO)
- Website: iaeroairways.com (archived)

iAero Airways, previously named Swift Air, was an American charter airline from 1997 to 2024, based in Greensboro, North Carolina with its main hub at Miami International Airport. The airline announced that it would cease all operations on April 6, 2024, after failed restructuring efforts during bankruptcy proceedings.

== History ==
=== Foundations as Swift Air ===
The former Swift Air logo.

The airline was established in 1997 and was a customer for the Embraer ERJ-135. In November 2006, the airline received authorization for Part 121 operations and began flying three Boeing 737-400s. These aircraft are each configured with all first class interiors, electrical outlets, and club work areas with tables. The primary use of these aircraft is air transportation for major professional sports team (NBA, NHL, MLB) and for VIP charters.

The John McCain 2008 presidential campaign utilized one of Swift Air's Boeing 737-400s, which was dubbed the Straight Talk Express, the same name given to his bus used earlier in the campaign. In June 2011, Swift Air originally planned to operate public charter flights from Chicago to some European destinations such as Belgrade, Zagreb and Kraków; however, these destinations were only flown in June 2011.

On June 17, 2011, Swift Air voluntarily suspended their Part 121 operations pending an inquiry by the FAA. Swift Air resumed normal part 121 operations on June 25, 2011, after making manual changes to satisfy the FAA.

In 2017, Swift Air announced plans to acquire Eastern Air Lines with two Boeing 737-800s. One aircraft remained painted in Eastern livery to protect the trademark, although the fleet of Dynamic Airways (owned by a co-owner of Swift Air) would eventually take the Eastern name and trademark (as Eastern Airlines, without the space), retaining the Dynamic AOC. Following the acquisition of assets from Eastern Air Lines, Swift Air began operating charter flights to Cuba for Havana Air.

=== Further development as iAero ===
In May 2019, Swift became a subsidiary of iAero Group, an aviation service firm minority owned by The Blackstone Group. Swift Air announced that it intended to rebrand itself as iAero Airways, following its recent takeover by the iAero Group. A filing with the US Department of Transportation (DOT) on September 9, 2019, stated that, at present time, it intends to retain its corporate name - Swift Air, LLC - and therefore does not seek the re-issuance of its operating licenses and certificates. By December 31, 2019, Swift Air subsequently transition its rebrand as iAero Airways.

On September 20, 2023, the airline announced that it would be filing for Chapter 11 bankruptcy. On March 14, 2024, it was announced that Eastern Air Express had bid $71 Million dollars to acquire the carrier's assets out of bankruptcy. However, on April 1, 2024, President Timothy Rainey announced in a memo to staff members that the airline would cease all operations at the end of the day on April 6, 2024. The company converted its case to a Chapter 7 bankruptcy liquidation on April 15, 2024.

== Operations ==
iAero Airways operated charter flights for nationally known fractional aircraft operators, financial institutions, construction and transportation as well as many collegiate athletic departments, professional sports organizations, and major tour operators. It was also a major contractor for U.S. Immigration and Customs Enforcement, operating many of the agency's deportation flights as well as flights transporting detainees between immigration detention facilities within the United States.

The airline also provided ACMI services for private owners.

== Fleet ==
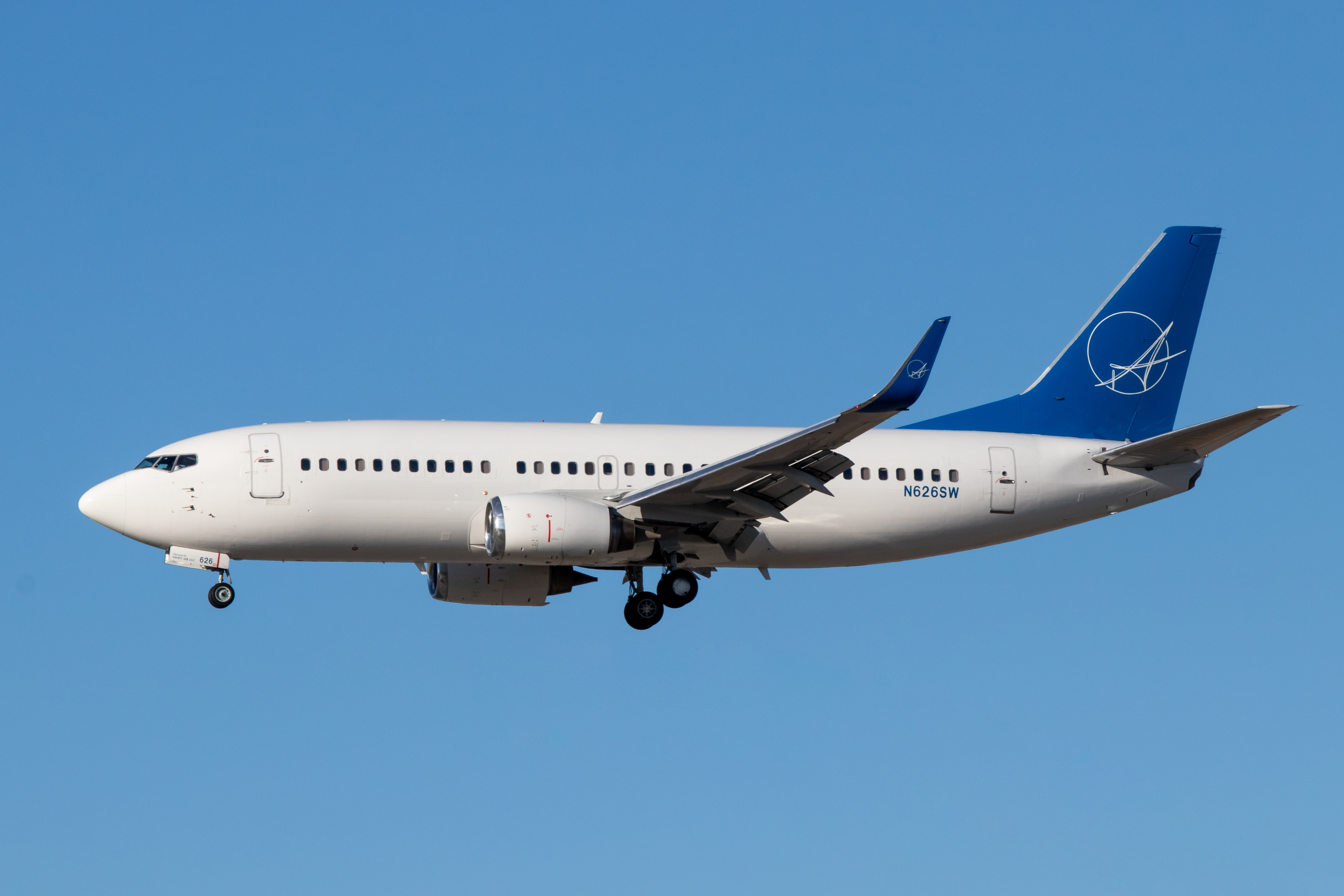
iAero Airways Boeing 737-300

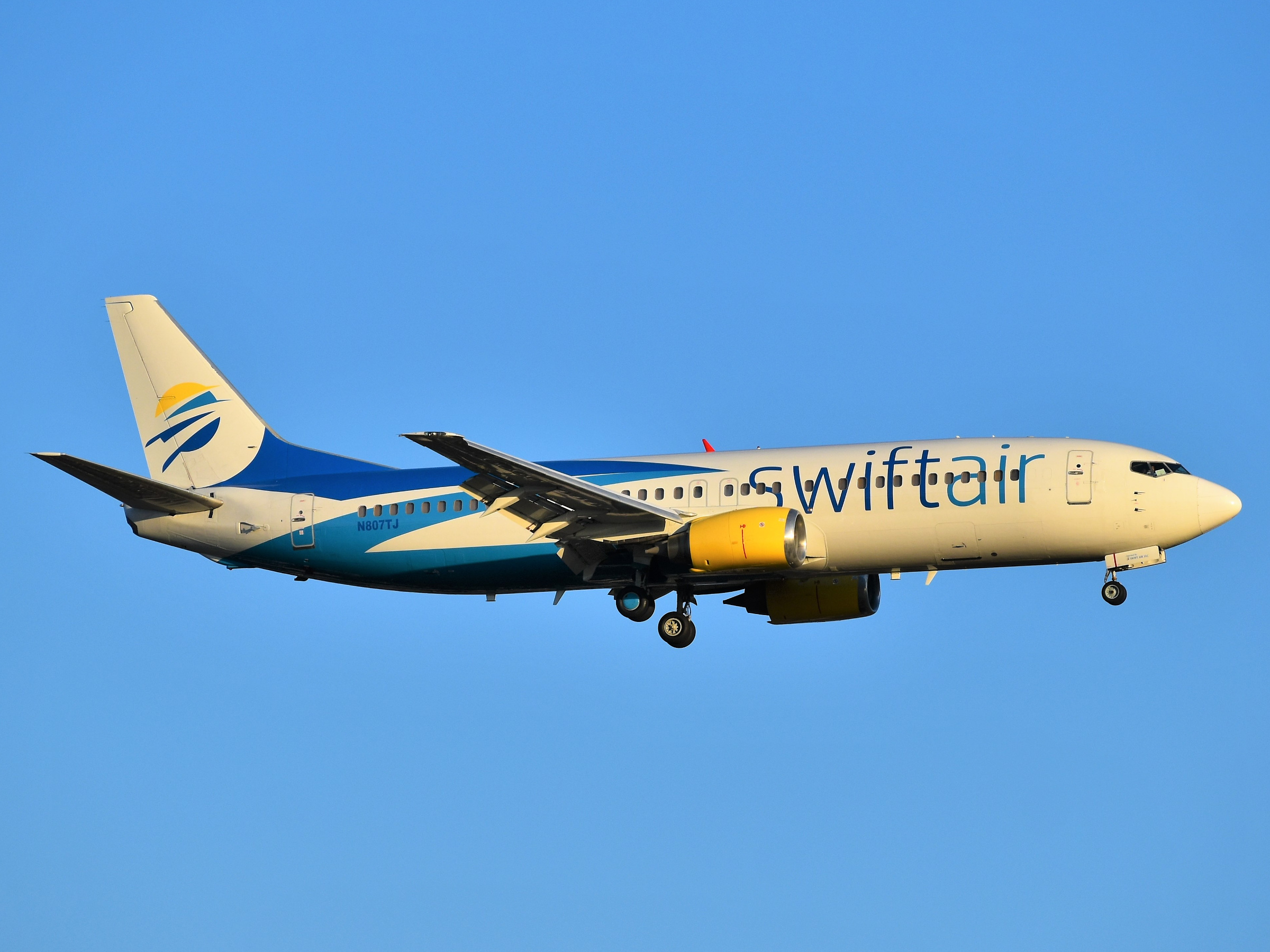
iAero Boeing 737-400 in former Swift Air branding.

=== Last fleet ===
As of April 2024 and prior to the closure of operations, the iAero Airways fleet included the following aircraft:

iAero Airways fleet
Aircraft	In service	Orders	Passengers			Notes
Aircraft	In service	Orders	F	Y	Total	Notes
Boeing 737-400	4	—	12	138	150	
Boeing 737-800	3	—	–	189	189	
Boeing 737-800BDSF	3	—	Cargo			Operated for DHL Aviation
Total	10	—				

=== Past fleet ===
As Swift Air, it also operated the following aircraft types:

iAero Airways former fleet
Aircraft	Total	Introduced	Retired	Notes
Boeing 727-200	1	2010	2013	
Boeing 737-300	10	2011	2024	
Boeing 737-400SF	2	2020	2024	Operated for DHL Aviation
Boeing 767-200ER	1	2010	2013	
Boeing 767-200ER	1	2017	2018	
Boeing 767-300ER	1	2022	2022	
Bombardier Challenger 800	1	2006	2008	
Cessna Citation V	4	1997	2006	
Cessna Citation X	9	1997	2010	
Dassault Falcon 2000	3	1999	2006	
Embraer Legacy 600	8	2002	2005	
Swearingen Merlin	1	1998	2001	

== See also ==
- List of airlines of the United States
