= Eastern Air Lines (2015) =

American low-cost airline (operated 2015–2017)

Eastern Air Lines Group, Inc.
IATA	ICAO	Call sign
EA	EAL	EASTERN
- Founded: May 28, 2015; 11 years ago
- Ceased operations: September 7, 2017; 9 years ago
- AOC #: 29EA847N
- Hubs: Miami International Airport
- Frequent-flyer program: LatinOnePass
- Fleet size: 6
- Destinations: 14
- Headquarters: Miami-Dade County, Florida
- Key people: CEO: James Tolzien. President: Vincent Viola.
- Website: easternairlines.aero (archive)

Eastern Air Lines Group, Inc. was an American low-cost airline from May 2015 to September 2017, based in Miami, Florida. It operated charter flights between Miami and destinations in the United States, Caribbean and Latin America.

In 2017, Swift Air acquired Eastern Air Lines.

== History ==
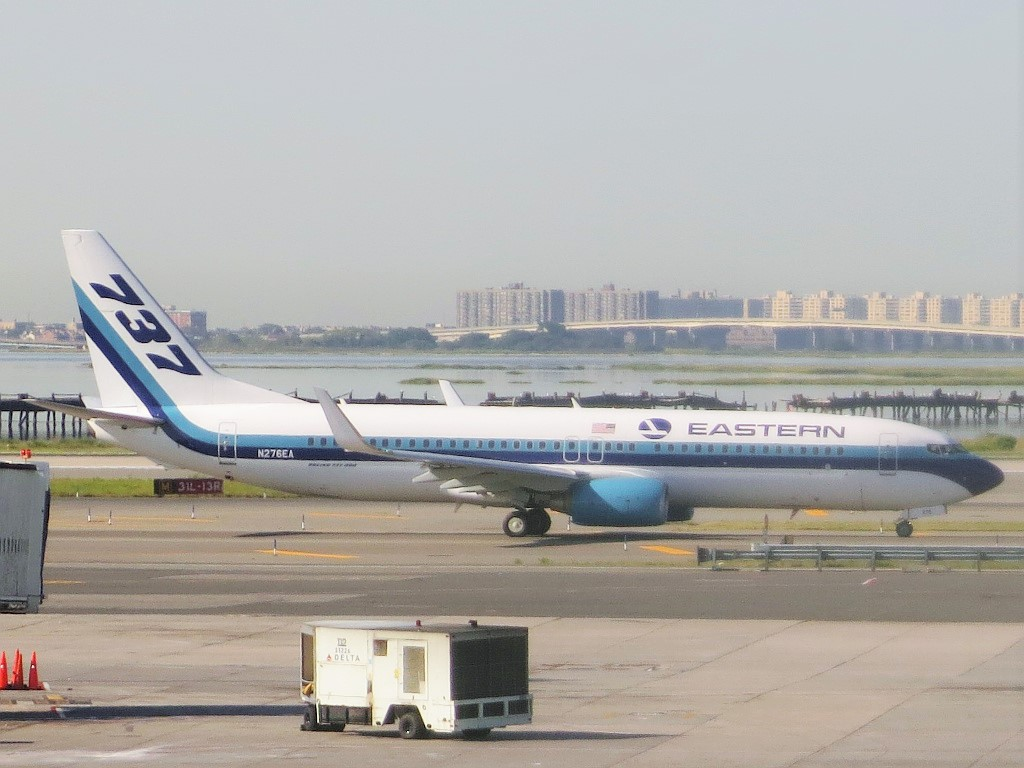
An Eastern Air Lines Boeing 737-800 taxiing at JFK Airport in 2015

The ownership group, Eastern Air Lines Group, purchased the intellectual property, including trademarks, of the original Eastern Air Lines in 2009, and announced in early 2014 that it had filed an application with the United States Department of Transportation for a certificate of public convenience and necessity, which would be followed by certification with the Federal Aviation Administration. On May 28, 2015, Eastern launched charter flights with a Boeing 737-800 aircraft from Miami International Airport (MIA) to José Martí International Airport in Havana and back to MIA. Two days later, the airline flew as part of Honor Flight, flying 60 veterans to Ronald Reagan Washington National Airport outside of Washington, D.C. Scheduled service was planned to follow 12 to 18 months later. However, the necessary FAA certification was not given.

On September 9, 2015, an Eastern Air Lines Boeing 737-800 came to the aid of stranded cruise ship passengers at St. Thomas.

On June 5, 2016, Eastern Air Lines flew the body of Muhammad Ali from Phoenix, Arizona to Louisville, Kentucky on one of its 737s.

Eastern Air Lines signed a three-year agreement in August 2015 to become the “Official Airline” for University of Miami Athletics. Eastern operated charter flights for some professional sports teams (Florida Panthers, San Francisco Giants, Miami Marlins, Oakland A's, Portland Timbers) and other colleges (Georgia State University, Georgia Southern University). It operated a scheduled charter operation to Cuba serving six cities. Eastern also operated charters to the Caribbean and Latin America (Dominican Republic, Venezuela, Costa Rica, Panama, Guyana, Haiti).

The new Eastern Air Lines operated from Building 5A at Miami International Airport. The building used to house the system and maintenance control centers of the original airline.

In 2017, Swift Air acquired Eastern Air Lines with two Boeing 737-800s.

Eastern Air Lines operated its last flight in September 2017. Swift completed its asset purchase and all remaining Eastern aircraft were transferred to the Swift certificate. In September 2017, Eastern surrendered its certificate to the Federal Aviation Administration (FAA). The Eastern name will be transferred to Dynamic International Airways, an airline co-owned by Swift ownership and now operating as Eastern Airlines.

The airline ceased operations on September 7, 2017.

== Destinations ==
Eastern Air Lines operated charter flights in the U.S. and also between Miami and Cuba, in a partnership with Havana Air. Other destinations in the Caribbean and Latin America were planned, pending contract signing.

== Frequent-flyer program ==
The airline announced that its frequent-flyer program would be called LatinOnePass, partially taking the name "OnePass" of the former Eastern Air Lines' program (which was then sold to Continental).

== Fleet ==
The Eastern Air Lines fleet was composed of the following aircraft (as of August 2017):

Aircraft	In service	Orders	Passengers			Notes
Aircraft	In service	Orders	C	Y	Total	Notes
Boeing 737-700	1	—	64	—	64	
Boeing 737-800	5	—	12	150	162	
Boeing 737 MAX 8	—	10	TBA			Planned to be delivered from 2018.
Mitsubishi MRJ90	—	20	TBA			Planned to be delivered from 2019.
Total	6	30				

The Eastern Air Lines Group placed orders for ten Boeing 737-800s, with the rights to purchase an additional ten Boeing 737 MAX 8 aircraft. The company announced in July 2014 that it had placed an order for 20 Mitsubishi MRJ90s, with rights to an additional 20 of the regional jet. The first used Boeing 737-800 was delivered in December 2014. It is named the Spirit of Captain Eddie Rickenbacker, after the early leader of the original Eastern Air Lines. On February 6, 2016, Eastern took delivery of its fifth aircraft, a used Boeing 737-800. This completed its first phase of aircraft acquisition.

Configuration plans called for 12 business class and 150 economy class seats in the Boeing aircraft, with room for 90 passengers in the Mitsubishi aircraft.

== Accidents and incidents ==
- On October 27, 2016: Eastern Air Lines Flight 3452, a Boeing 737-700 (N278EA), carrying then-Republican vice presidential candidate Mike Pence, skidded off the runway and settled on the concrete arrestor bed after taking too long to stop on the runway at LaGuardia Airport. It was only lightly damaged and Pence along with his team were transferred to aircraft N277EA. The final NTSB report was issued in September 2017.

== See also ==
- List of defunct airlines of the United States
