= 21 Air =

American cargo airline

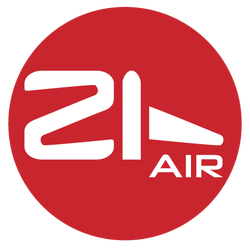

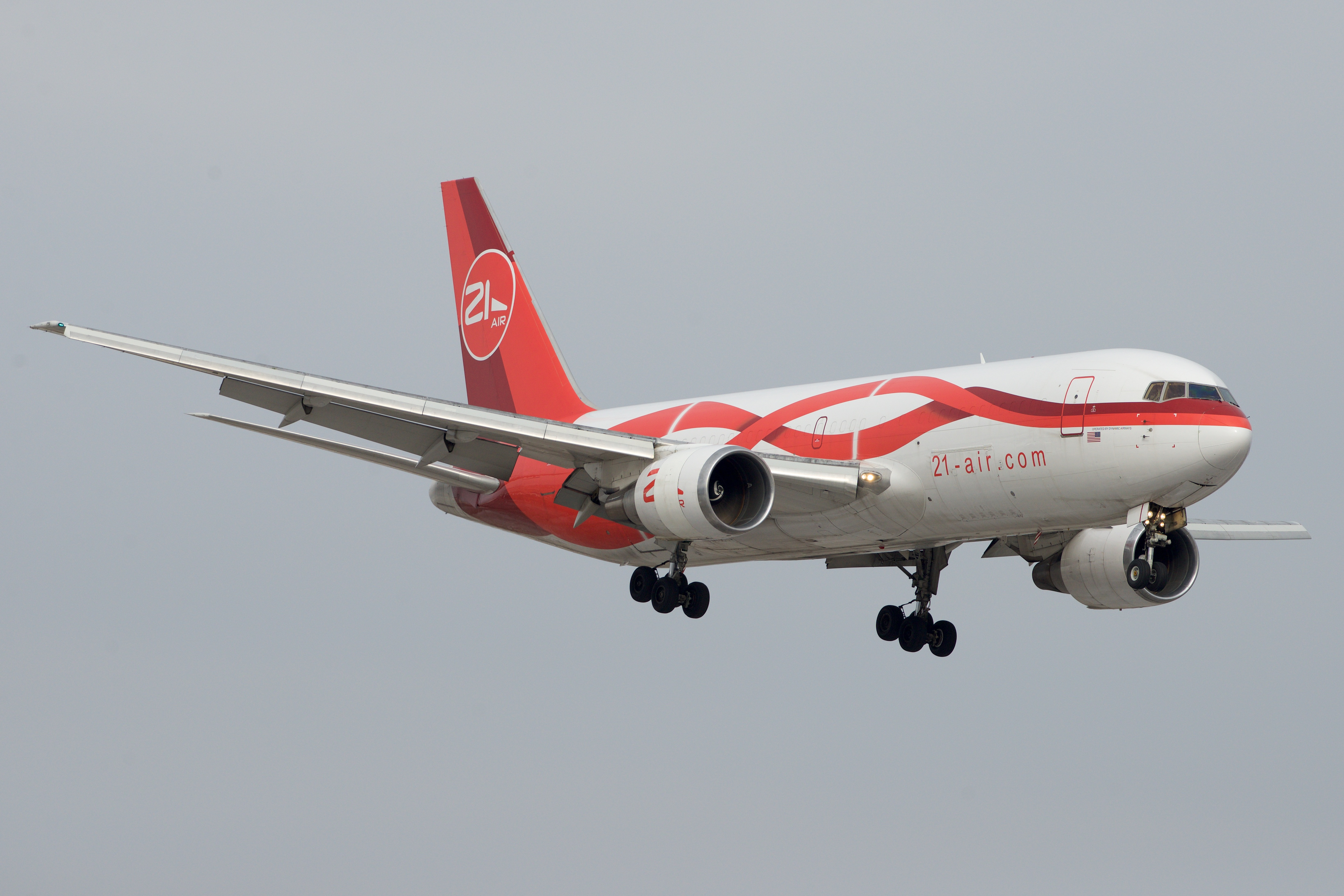
IATA	ICAO	Call sign
2I	CSB	CARGO SOUTH
- Founded: February 25, 2014; 12 years ago
- AOC #: 21GA896P
- Operating bases: Miami International Airport; Piedmont Triad International Airport
- Fleet size: 22
- Parent company: Avia Acquisitions, LLC
- Headquarters: Greensboro, North Carolina, U.S.
- Key people: Jim Crane (Owner); Keith Winters (CEO); Olga Guerra (CFO)
- Website: 21air.us

21 Air, LLC is an all-cargo airline of the United States headquartered in Greensboro, North Carolina. The airline operates ACMI charters with a fleet of Boeing 757s and 767s.

== History ==
21 Air was founded on February 25, 2014, as a virtual airline operating under Dynamic Airways' air operator's certificate. It was founded by Adolfo Moreno, who formerly operated an air cargo brokerage firm in Miami. In 2015, the company had revenues of US$12.6 million. 21 Air began operating under its own air operator's certificate in the summer of 2016, initially operating two Boeing 767 freighter aircraft.

In early 2019, 21 Air operated a series of cargo flights from the United States to Venezuela. Venezuelan authorities reported that the cargo on one of the flights arriving in Valencia included a crate of military equipment, which held guns, radio equipment, and ammunition. The origin and purpose of the weapons were not clear.

21 Air began operating services on behalf of DHL Aviation in 2020. The airline began operating flights for Amazon Air in 2024, with a fleet of Boeing 767 aircraft. The initial fleet of seven aircraft were leased by Amazon from Titan Aviation, which contracted 21 Air to operate them. The aircraft were formerly operated by Titan's sibling company Atlas Air.

The airline changed ownership in 2021, with a 25% stake acquired by Canadian cargo airline Cargojet, and a controlling stake held by logistics industry veteran Jim Crane. Crane, who also owns the Houston Astros baseball team, was formerly chair of Cargojet's board of directors.

Former Amerijet International CEO Tim Strauss served as CEO of the airline from 2024 through early 2026. He was replaced by Keith Winters, a longtime associate of Crane. In April 2026, Cargojet sold its 25% shares of 21 Air in order to focus on its own operations. Both airlines continue to operate on "select commercial opportunities".

Following the crash of Flight 7598, an Amazon cargo flight to Miami, in September 2026, industry observers raised concerns about the safety culture of the airline, which was the subject of a whistleblower lawsuit. On September 14, an Amazon spokesperson said that the company had decided to pause its operations with 21 Air.

== Destinations ==
21 Air operates scheduled cargo services between the United States and Mexico. The airline began operating services to the Dominican Republic and Colombia for Amazon Air in 2025.

On September 14, 2026, Amazon suspended 21 Air's Amazon Air operations, revoking their ability to haul Amazon packages, following the crash of Flight 7598.

== Fleet ==
As of September 2026, 21 Air operated 13 Boeing 767 and 5 Boeing 757 aircraft, some leased from DHL or Amazon affiliates.

Earlier aircraft details:

Aircraft	In service	Notes
Boeing 757-200PCF	6 (in 2025)	Operating for DHL Aviation
Boeing 767-200BDSF	2 (in 2021)	One operating for DHL Aviation
Boeing 767-300BCF	14	Operating for DHL Aviation, and LATAM Cargo Colombia

The airline previously used a single passenger Airbus A330-200 as an auxiliary freighter on a sub-service basis.

== Accidents and incidents ==
- On September 6, 2026, 21 Air Flight 7598, a Boeing 767-33AER(BDSF) registered N1997A operating for Amazon Air from Luis Muñoz Marín International Airport in San Juan, Puerto Rico, overran Runway 30 while landing at Miami International Airport, Florida. The aircraft struck multiple vehicles during the excursion, catching on fire in the process. Five people on the ground were killed, and another three were injured.

== See also ==
- List of airlines of the United States
