= Utah Airways =

Airline of the United States

- Commenced operations: January 5, 2015; 10 years ago
- Hubs: Ogden-Hinckley Airport
- Headquarters: Ogden, Utah
- Key people: David Story (Founder)
- Website: www.flyutahair.com

Utah Airways is a commercial and private charter/tour airline based in Ogden, Utah.

== History ==
Utah Airways was started by two pilot friends to provide tours between Ogden and various national park locations. Operations began January 5, 2015. The airline also provides scheduled flights from Salt Lake City to Wendover, Utah. It added limited, unsubsidized service to Moab in October 2015, after SkyWest Airlines dropped the destination and Great Lakes Airlines failed to commence its proposed subsidized service.

== Current destinations ==
As of January 2016, Utah Airways destinations include:

- (Moab, Utah) Canyonlands Field
- (Ogden, Utah) Ogden-Hinckley Airport Hub
- (Salt Lake City, Utah) Salt Lake City International Airport
- (Wendover, Utah) Wendover Airport
- Las Vegas
- Los Angeles
- San Diego
- Phoenix
- San Francisco

== Fleet ==
As of January 2016, the Utah Airways fleet consists of the following aircraft:

Utah Airways fleet
Aircraft	In service	Orders	Notes
Piper PA-31 Navajo	2	—	operated by Snowshoe Air
