= 7Air Cargo =

American cargo airline based in Miami

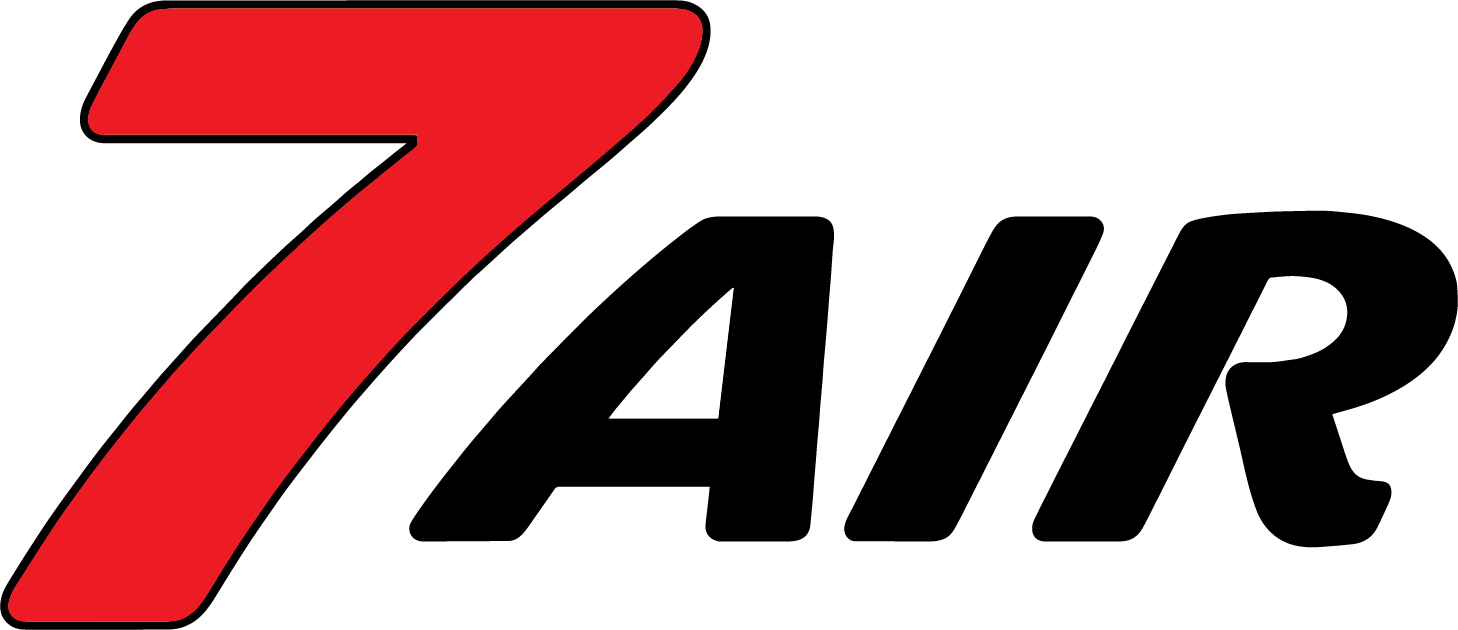

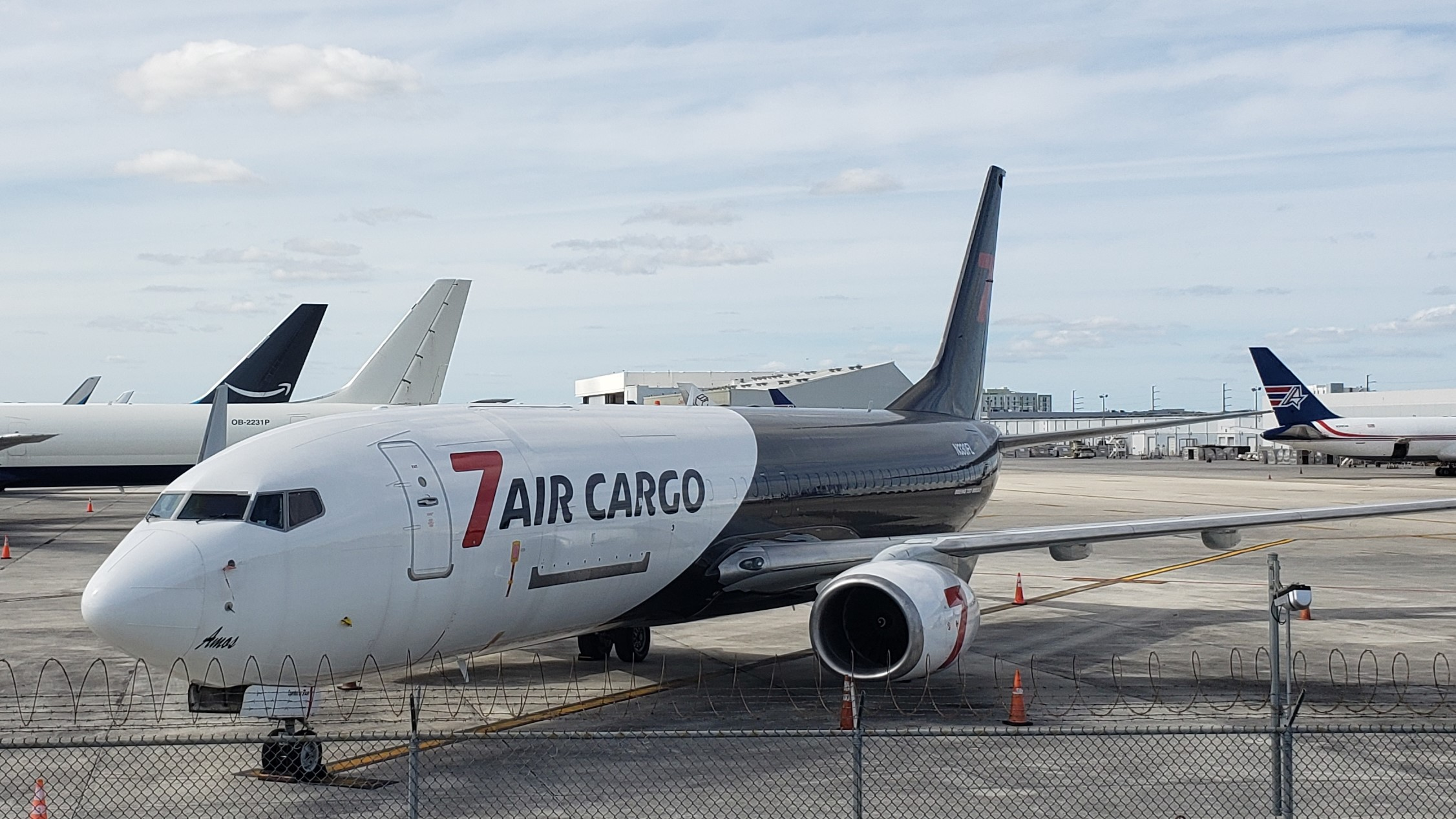
IATA	ICAO	Call sign
R7	TXG	CARGO BOX
- Founded: September 16, 2020
- Hubs: Miami International Airport
- Fleet size: 2
- Destinations: 11 (Scheduled)
- Parent company: Xtreme Aviation, LLC
- Headquarters: Miami, Florida
- Key people: Iraq Pacheco (CEO)
- Website: fly7air.com

7Air Cargo, LLC is a cargo airline headquartered in Miami, Florida, operating as a dedicated FAA Part 121 carrier. It was founded in September 2020 with its roots tracing back to The Xtreme Group, an aircraft maintenance company. The airline has ambitions to do Charter, ACMI, and MRO services. 7Air Cargo officially received its FAA Part 121 air operator's certificate in June 2025. In September 2025, they added services to Antigua and Costa Rica. In October 2025, they provided humanitarian aid services to Jamaica.

The airline focuses on providing comprehensive cargo services, including Aircraft, Crew, Maintenance, and Insurance (ACMI) leasing, Crew, Maintenance, and Insurance (CMI) arrangements, full charters, scheduled charters, and ad-hoc charters. Its integrated approach, including proprietary MRO capabilities through its affiliation with The Xtreme Group, aims to offer efficient maintenance and cost-effective overhauls, supporting its goal to provide reliable, punctual, and safe transportation for specialized goods and e-commerce parcels globally.

In March 2026, Ed Wegel was named the airline's CEO after 7 months of operations. As of May 2026, he stepped down pending new ownership, with World Atlantic Airlines executive Iraq Pacheco assuming the role. In June 2026, lessor Aircastle filed a lawsuit seeking repossession of two 737-800SF placed with 7Air, after the airline missed over $900,000 in payments.

== Destinations ==
7Air Cargo operates both scheduled and non-scheduled routes from Miami International Airport at its 10,900 m^{2} facility. It advertises service to Antigua, St Kitts, San José (CR), Havana, Santo Domingo–Las Américas, San Salvador, Guatemala City, Georgetown–Cheddi Jagan, Kingston–Norman Manley, Managua, and San Juan. Saint Lucia was recently added to the destination list.

== Fleet ==
As of June 2026, 7Air Cargo operates the following aircraft:

7Air Cargo fleet
Aircraft	In service	Orders	Notes
Boeing 737-800BCF	2	1	
Boeing 767F		1	
Total	2	1	

== See also ==
- List of airlines of the United States
