= Eastern Air Express =

American charter airline

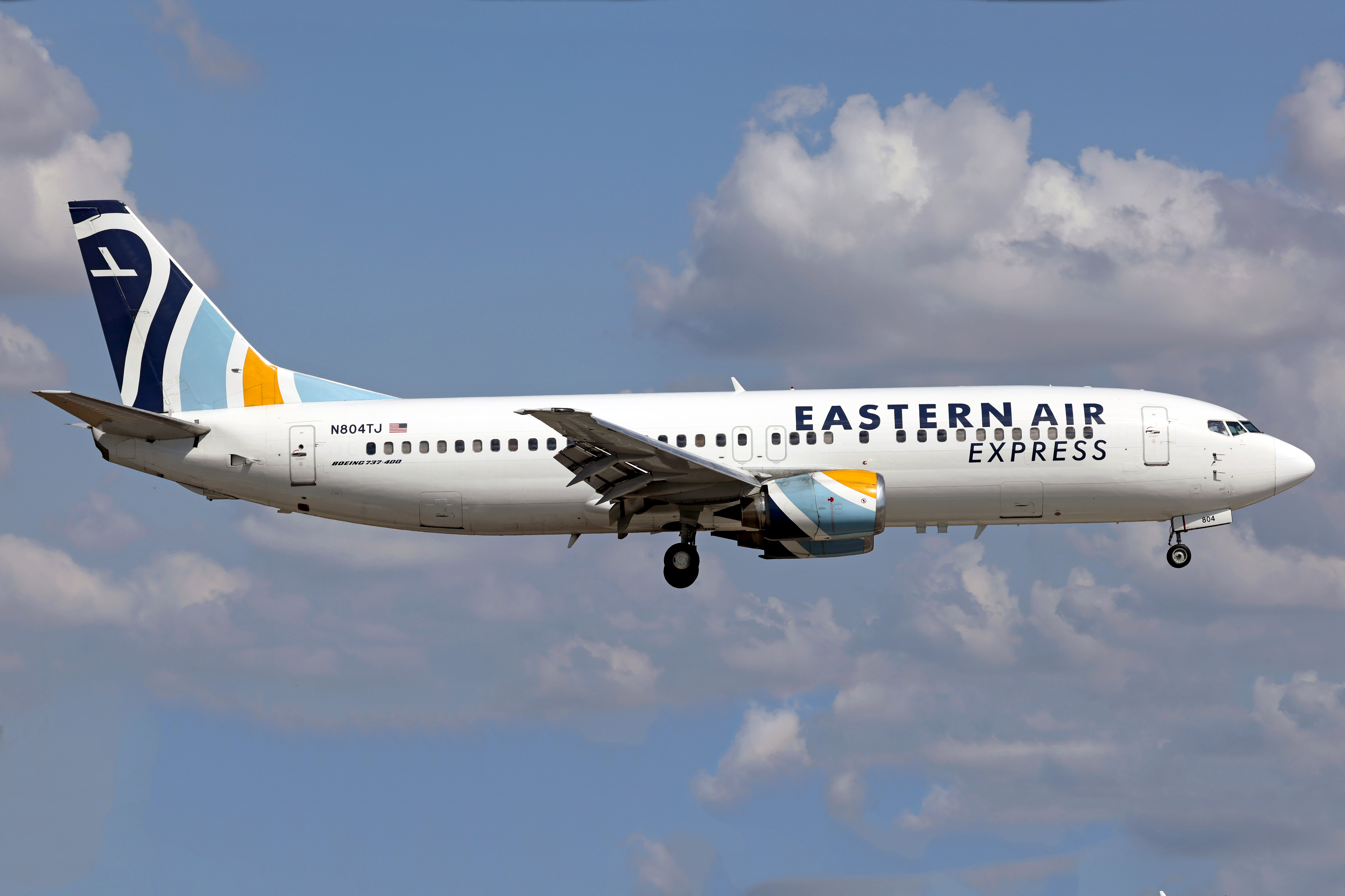
| IATA | ICAO | Call sign |
|---|---|---|
| - | BBQ | EASTERN EXPRESS |
- Founded: 2013; 13 years ago (as ATX Air Services)
- Commenced operations: July 2017; 9 years ago (as Hillwood Airways); November 13, 2023; 2 years ago (as Eastern Air Express)
- AOC #: 4TXA995N
- Operating bases: Kansas City; Miami
- Fleet size: 19
- Parent company: Eastern Air Holdings Inc.
- Headquarters: Kansas City, Missouri
- Key people: Jeffrey Conry (CEO); Brian Randow (COO)
- Website: goeasternair.com

Eastern Air Express (formerly Hillwood Airways and ATX Air Services) is an American charter airline headquartered in Kansas City, Missouri. It was formerly a subsidiary of The Perot Group, which is controlled by Ross Perot, Jr.

== History ==
Former Hillwood Airways logo

The airline was initially founded in 2013 as ATX Air Services and operated under a Federal Aviation Administration (FAA) Part 125 certificate, limiting the airline to only flying under long-term agreements with a few clients.

ATX Air Services rebranded as Hillwood Airways in 2016, received its FAA Part 121 Air Carrier Certification on July 24, 2017, and subsequently started charter operations.

The airline commenced operations with a single Boeing 737-700C BBJ and currently offers it for charter in four configurations: 36 first-class seats with two conference tables, 60 first-class seats, 90 premium economy seats, or as a full freighter. It is one of only a few Boeing 737 BBJs fitted with a full-size main-deck cargo door.

Between 2019 and 2021, the airline took delivery of three regular Boeing 737-700s that were originally delivered to Airtran Airways and ConocoPhillips. The three 737-700s are available for charter in all-passenger configurations ranging from 60 first class to 100 premium economy seats.

One of the airline's Boeing 737-700s was involved in the 2021 Kabul airlift.

In May 2023, Eastern Air Holdings, owner of Eastern Airlines, announced its plans to acquire Hillwood Airways. The airline was officially purchased on August 15, 2023, and continues to operate under its existing brand. The company announced on November 13, 2023, its rebrand as Eastern Air Express.

In February 2024, Eastern Air Holdings selected Kansas City, Missouri as its new headquarters.

In April 2024, Eastern Air Holdings acquired the aircraft and other assets of iAero Airways.

As of at least February 2025, Eastern Air Express has been contracted by U.S. Immigration and Customs Enforcement (ICE) to operate deportation flights of ICE detainees. An August 2025 report by CNN showed an Eastern Air Express plane in Richmond, Virginia boarding more than 30 detainees with their hands in restraints, after the plane had flown through multiple states, including Louisiana, for other pickups and drop-offs.

== Fleet ==
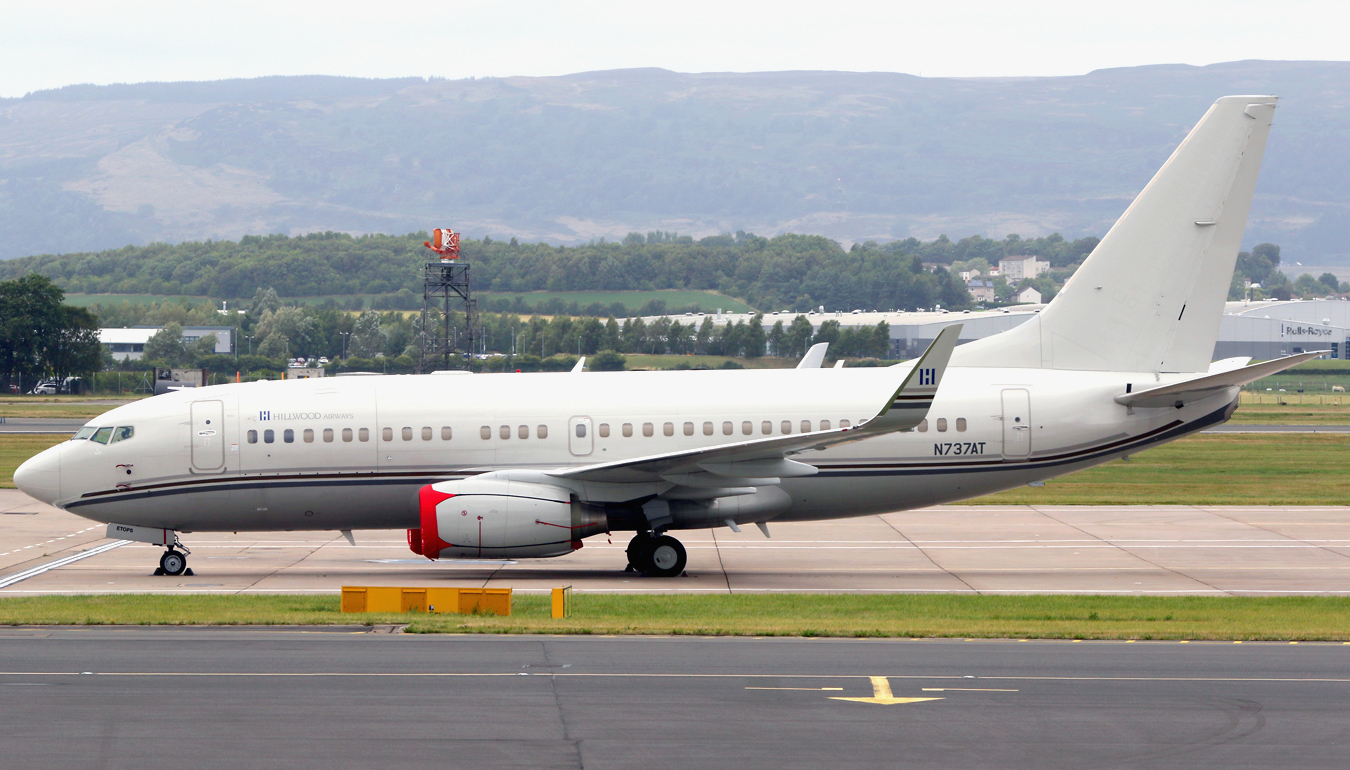
Hillwood Airways Boeing 737-700 at Glasgow Airport in 2018

=== Current ===
As of October 2025, Eastern Air Express operates the following aircraft:

| Aircraft | In service | Orders | Passengers | | | Notes |
| Aircraft | In service | Orders | F | Y | Total | Notes |
|---|---|---|---|---|---|---|
| Boeing 737-300 | 3 | — | – | 148 | 148 | |
| Boeing 737-300BDSF | 1 | — | Cargo | | | |
| Boeing 737-400 | 10 | — | 12 | 138 | 150 | |
| Boeing 737-700 | 3 | — | – | 148 | 148 | |
| Boeing 737-800 | 2 | — | – | 189 | 189 | |
| Total | 19 | — | | | | |

== See also ==
- List of airlines of the United States
