= 21 Air Flight 7598 =

2026 aviation accident in Florida

- An aerial view of the crash site

Accident
- Date: September 6, 2026
- Summary: Runway overrun, under investigation
- Site: Miami International Airport, Miami-Dade County, Florida, United States; 25°48′07″N 80°18′26″W
- Total fatalities: 5
- Total injuries: 5

Aircraft
- N1997A, the aircraft involved in the accident, pictured in March 2026
- Aircraft type: Boeing 767-33AER(BDSF) (Note: The aircraft was a Boeing 767-300ER, with "ER" denoting the Extended Range variant. The BDSF suffix denotes "Bedek Special Freighter", a passenger-to-freighter conversion program by Israel Aerospace Industries. Boeing assigns each customer a unique code incorporated into the model designation at manufacture; thus, "767-33AER" denotes a 767-300ER built for AWAS, whose customer code is 3A.)
- Aircraft name: Amazon One
- Operator: 21 Air on behalf of Amazon Air
- IATA flight No.: 2I7598
- ICAO flight No.: CSB7598
- Call sign: CARGO SOUTH 7598
- Registration: N1997A
- Flight origin: Luis Muñoz Marín International Airport, Carolina, Puerto Rico
- Destination: Miami International Airport, Miami-Dade County, Florida, United States
- Occupants: 2
- Passengers: 0
- Crew: 2
- Fatalities: 0
- Injuries: 2
- Survivors: 2

Ground casualties
- Ground fatalities: 5
- Ground injuries: 3

21 Air Flight 7598 was a scheduled domestic cargo flight operated by 21 Air on behalf of Amazon Air from Luis Muñoz Marín International Airport in Carolina, Puerto Rico, to Miami International Airport in Miami-Dade County, Florida, United States. On September 6, 2026, the Boeing 767 freighter overran the runway while landing in Miami, striking multiple vehicles in the process. Five people were killed, while five others, including both pilots, sustained injuries.

The crash was the third and deadliest major accident involving a Boeing 767 aircraft flying for Amazon. It subsequently raised questions about the safety standards at 21 Air.

== Background ==
=== Aircraft ===
The aircraft involved was a 32-year-old Boeing 767-33AER(BDSF), registered N1997A, operated by 21 Air on behalf of Amazon Air, and powered by two General Electric CF6-80C2B6F engines. The aircraft was originally ordered by aircraft lessor AWAS and was first delivered to Belgian carrier Sobelair in 1994. It was converted to a freighter in 2016 by Israel Aerospace Industries under its "Bedek Special Freighter" (BDSF) program. The airframe was written off following the accident.

=== Flight crew ===
The 55-year-old captain, Joseph Carroll, received his type rating in the 767 in May 2026 and previously flew as a US military helicopter pilot. He had accrued 7,267 total flight hours, of which 150 were in the 767. He had also previously flown the Boeing 737. The first officer, Jaime Felipe Silva Molina, received his type rating for the 767 in April 2025. He had around 2,800 flight hours, of which 800 were in the 767. He had previously flown the McDonnell Douglas DC-9.

== Accident ==
On September 6, 2026, 21 Air Flight 7598 departed from Luis Muñoz Marín International Airport in Carolina, Puerto Rico, and arrived at Miami International Airport. The aircraft overran runway 30 while landing around 1:53 p.m. The plane first struck a Ford Econoline van carrying seven passengers working for an airline cleaning company. It then crashed through a fence and was crossing Northwest 67th Avenue when it struck a Toyota Corolla Cross SUV. A minor fire broke out as a result of the crash, which was soon extinguished. Part of the plane’s right wing was burned off and its fuselage was damaged by the fire. The last moments of the overrun and the plane coming to rest were captured on video. Five people were killed, and five others were injured, three of them critically. All five fatalities were occupants of the Ford Econoline and employees of Professional Ocean Service Corporation, an airline cleaning contractor.

== Investigation ==
A National Transportation Safety Board (NTSB) investigation was opened on September 6, with media briefings released on September 7 and 8. A preliminary report was released on October 1.

Based on flight data recovered by the NTSB, a timeline of the accident sequence has been released. At 30 seconds before the end of the recording (T-30), the nosewheel and right main landing gear touched down at a ground speed of 158 knots (182 mph; 293 km/h). At T-23 seconds, brakes were applied at a speed of 146 knots (168 mph; 270 km/h). At T-19, left main landing gear touched down at 134 knots (154 mph; 248 km/h). At T-15, brakes were released and engine throttles were increased to go-around thrust at a speed of 120 knots (138 mph; 222 km/h). At T-11, throttles were reduced to idle and brakes were reapplied at a speed of 117 knots (135 mph; 217 km/h). At T-0, the data recording ended at a speed of 65 knots (75 mph; 120 km/h). The NTSB notes that neither speed brakes nor thrust reversers were deployed.

A summary of the cockpit voice recorder released by the NTSB indicated that one of the pilots cautioned that they were too fast. While the pilot made additional comments regarding the aircraft's excessive speed throughout the recording, there were no consistent acknowledgements from the other pilot. A pilot also called for a go-around shortly before the end of the recording.

Weather conditions at the time were described as "light thunderstorms and gusting winds".

The NTSB later confirmed that the aircraft came to a stop approximately 1,300 feet (400 m) past the paved surface of the runway in a fenced parking lot. Investigators described the scene as "utter devastation".

== Aftermath ==
NTSB investigators at the site of the 21 Air Flight 7598 accident at Miami International Airport

The Federal Aviation Administration issued a ground stop at the airport in response to the crash. It was reported that some people were trapped in their vehicles. The ground stop was rescinded at 5:00 p.m. as the airport partially reopened, with a ground delay program remaining in effect. According to website FlightAware, more than 160 flights were canceled and nearly 325 others delayed as a result of the crash. Some flights were subsequently diverted to Orlando International Airport, more than 200 miles (170 nmi; 320 km) north of Miami.

=== Lawsuit ===
On September 9, 2026, Morgan & Morgan filed a lawsuit in Miami-Dade court against Amazon.com, Inc., 21 Air LLC, and others, alleging criminal negligence that resulted in the death of Yoel Rodriguez Naranjo, one of those killed aboard the van. The legal action alleges that the use of a 32-year-old aircraft, pilot error, and insufficient training contributed to the accident.

== Responses ==
On September 7, Amazon, 21 Air, and Boeing expressed condolences and their readiness to cooperate with investigations. On September 14, an Amazon spokesperson said that the company had decided to pause its operations with 21 Air.

== See also ==
- 2026 in aviation
- List of accidents and incidents involving airliners in the United States § Florida
- Similar accidents and incidents:
  - American Airlines Flight 625, a passenger flight that overran the runway after an attempted go-around at St. Thomas Airport
  - Emirates SkyCargo Flight 9788, a cargo flight that collided with an airport ground vehicle and overran the runway at Hong Kong International, then crashed into the South China Sea
  - Fine Air Flight 101, a cargo flight that crashed into a parking lot after takeoff from Miami International
  - Sky Lease Cargo Flight 4854, a cargo flight that overran the runway at Halifax due to excessive speeds
