= Eastern Airlines (2018) =

Charter airline of the United States

Eastern Airlines, LLC

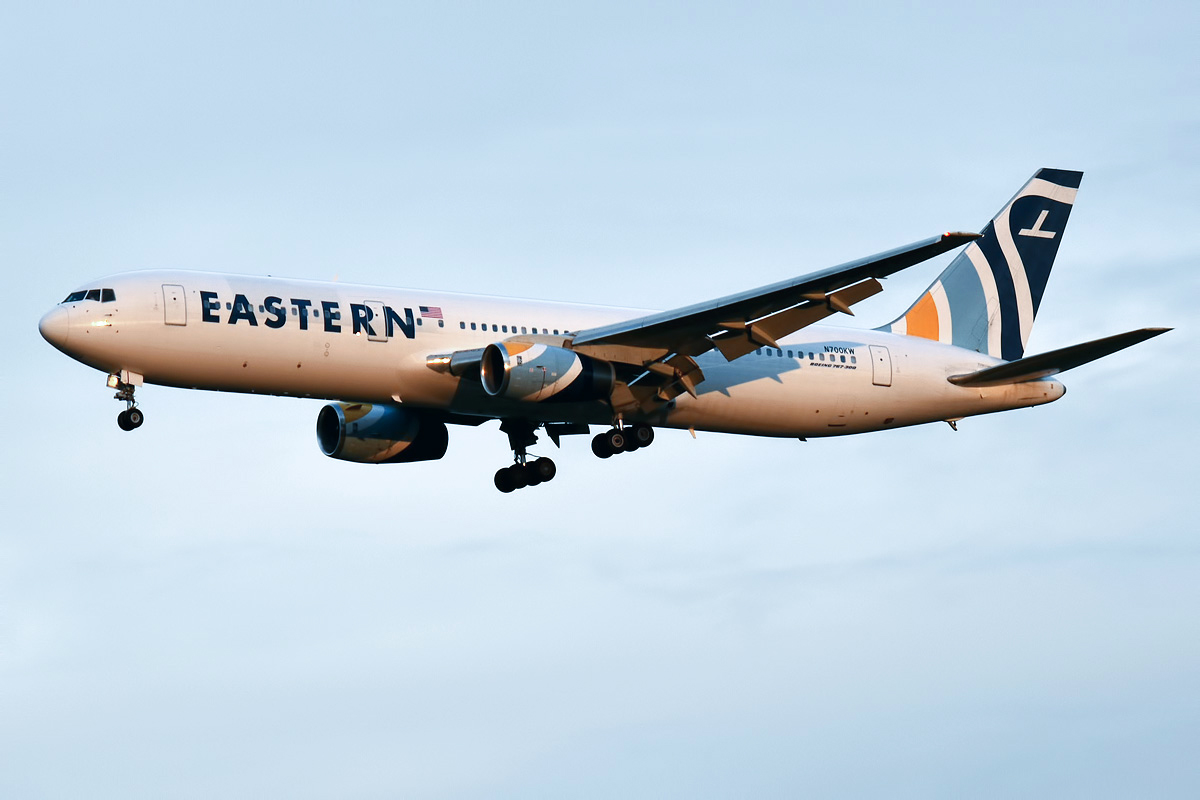
| IATA | ICAO | Call sign |
|---|---|---|
| 2D | EAL | EASTERN |
- Founded: October 2010; 16 years ago (as Dynamic Airways)
- Commenced operations: April 2018; 8 years ago (as Eastern Airlines)
- AOC #: 2DYA074Q
- Hubs: Kansas City
- Subsidiaries: Eastern Air Express
- Fleet size: 6
- Parent company: Eastern Air Holdings Inc.
- Headquarters: Kansas City, Missouri
- Key people: Brian Newhart (COO); Mathew B Wright (Acting President)
- Website: goeasternair.com

Eastern Airlines, LLC is an American airline headquartered in Kansas City, Missouri in the TWA Administrative Offices Building. The airline operates a mixed fleet of Boeing 767 and Boeing 777 aircraft. It was founded in 2010 as Dynamic Airways: the company rebranded as Eastern Airlines in 2018 following a successful bankruptcy restructuring and obtained a license to use the Eastern intellectual property from Swift Air.

== History ==
=== Dynamic Airways ===
Dynamic Airways' former logo

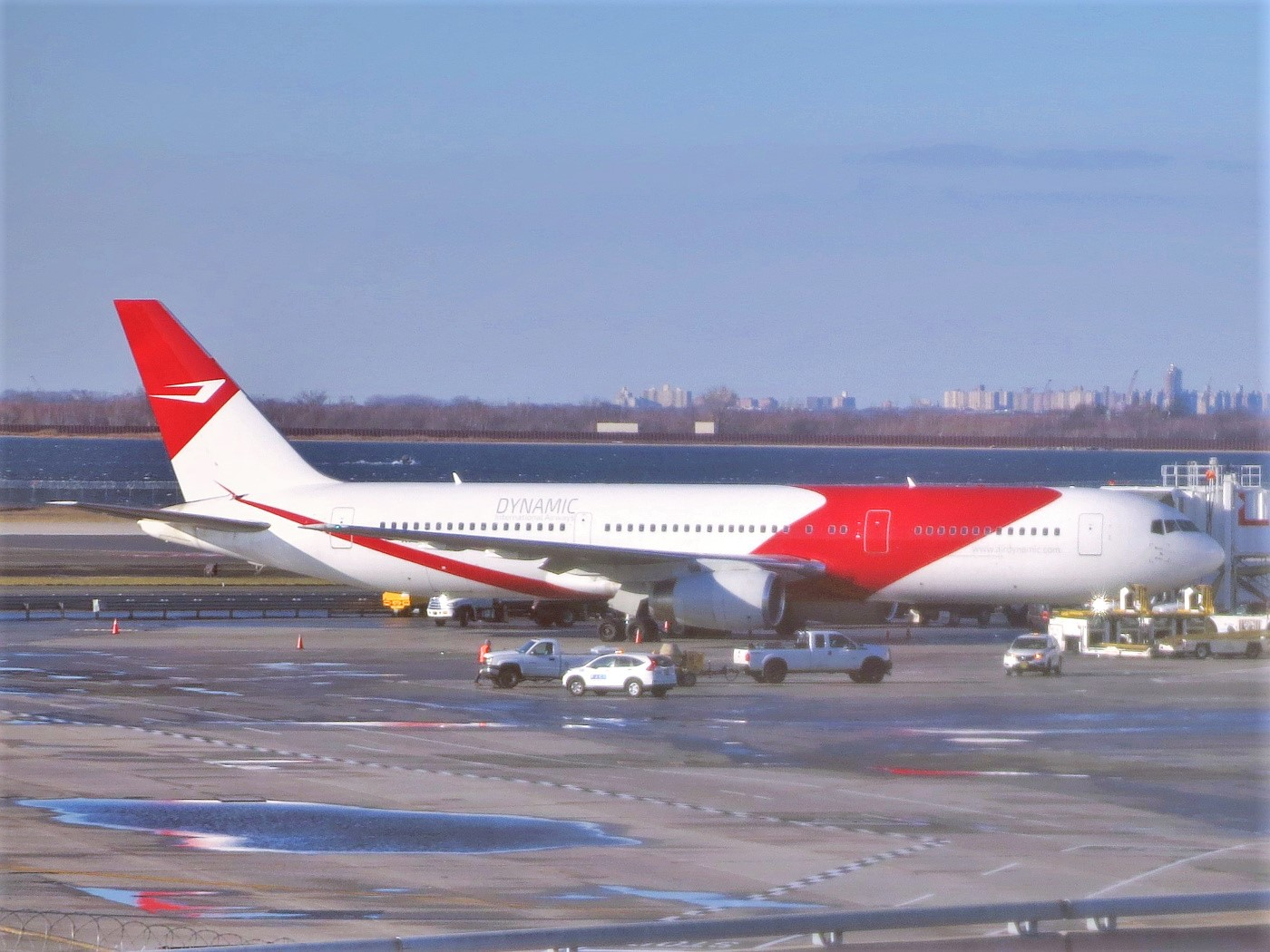
Dynamic Airways Boeing 767-300ER at JFK Airport Terminal 1, in the former livery

Dynamic Airways was established by Dynamic Aviation with its first aircraft being a second-hand McDonnell Douglas MD-88 delivered a year before operations started in 2009. The airline officially started operations in early October 2010 after receiving its air operator's certificate.

The airline was headquartered in High Point, North Carolina, with its maintenance facilities based in Piedmont Triad International Airport.

Not long after the purchase of the second MD-88, Dynamic announced a three-year partnership flying for Hoda Air Services in South Korea. The deal, which included an MD-88 supported by a full crew, was the airline's first in Asia. The airline continued to expand more Boeing 767s were delivered, which were, according to the airline, available for ACMI wet lease, full charter, and corporate shuttle programs for private and government organizations.

In March 2012, Direct Air temporarily suspended its operations and canceled all charter flights, subsequently filing for bankruptcy. It ceased operations completely shortly after, having racked up millions of dollars in debts. The MD-88 was returned to Dynamic as a result. This 767 entered operations in early 2013.

Dynamic operated a successful wet-lease ACMI for EZjet, operating regular flights from New York City to Georgetown utilizing their 767-200. This operation ceased in 2012, prompting Dynamic's move into regularly scheduled services.

In February 2014, Dynamic Airways entered the Chinese tourism market with a significant operation of scheduled charter flights, capitalizing on the mid-2010s surge in Chinese demand for warm-weather island getaways. Between 2014 and 2016, the airline partnered with major Chinese travel agencies to offer flights from over a dozen cities — including Shanghai, Beijing, Tianjin, and Chongqing — to popular island destinations such as the Maldives, Palau, Saipan, and Guam, operating up to 15 flights per month. Dynamic also launched charter services from China to Ontario, California, via a stopover in Anchorage, Alaska. However, facing declining market viability and blame for operational reliability issues, the airline exited the China market in late 2016.

Since 2014, the airline added "International" to its name to when it transitioned from a pure ACMI/charter provider to a scheduled and charter services airline. Dynamic started with the resurrection of the New York to Georgetown route in June 2014, competing with Caribbean Airlines and Fly Jamaica Airways on that route, the latter two flying the route as a fifth-freedom service.In 2015, Dynamic also added services from Fort Lauderdale, flying to both Caracas and Rio de Janeiro. In 2016, Dynamic added new routes from New York to the Caribbean and Latin America, commencing service to Caracas (filling a void left after American Airlines canceled that same route) Cancún, and Punta Cana, and entered both the Chicago and Los Angeles markets, with service from Chicago to both Punta Cana and Cancún, and from Los Angeles to Cancún and San Juan.

By August 2016, however, all of the new routes except for the New York to Caracas route had been canceled and the Fort Lauderdale to Caracas service. Soon after those cancellations, Mexican low-cost carrier Interjet began operating some of the canceled routes to and from Cancún.

After summer of 2017, Dynamic withdrew from scheduled services and re-focused as an ACMI operator. In November 2017, Dynamic and its affiliated airline Swift Air went bankrupt.

=== Eastern Airlines ===
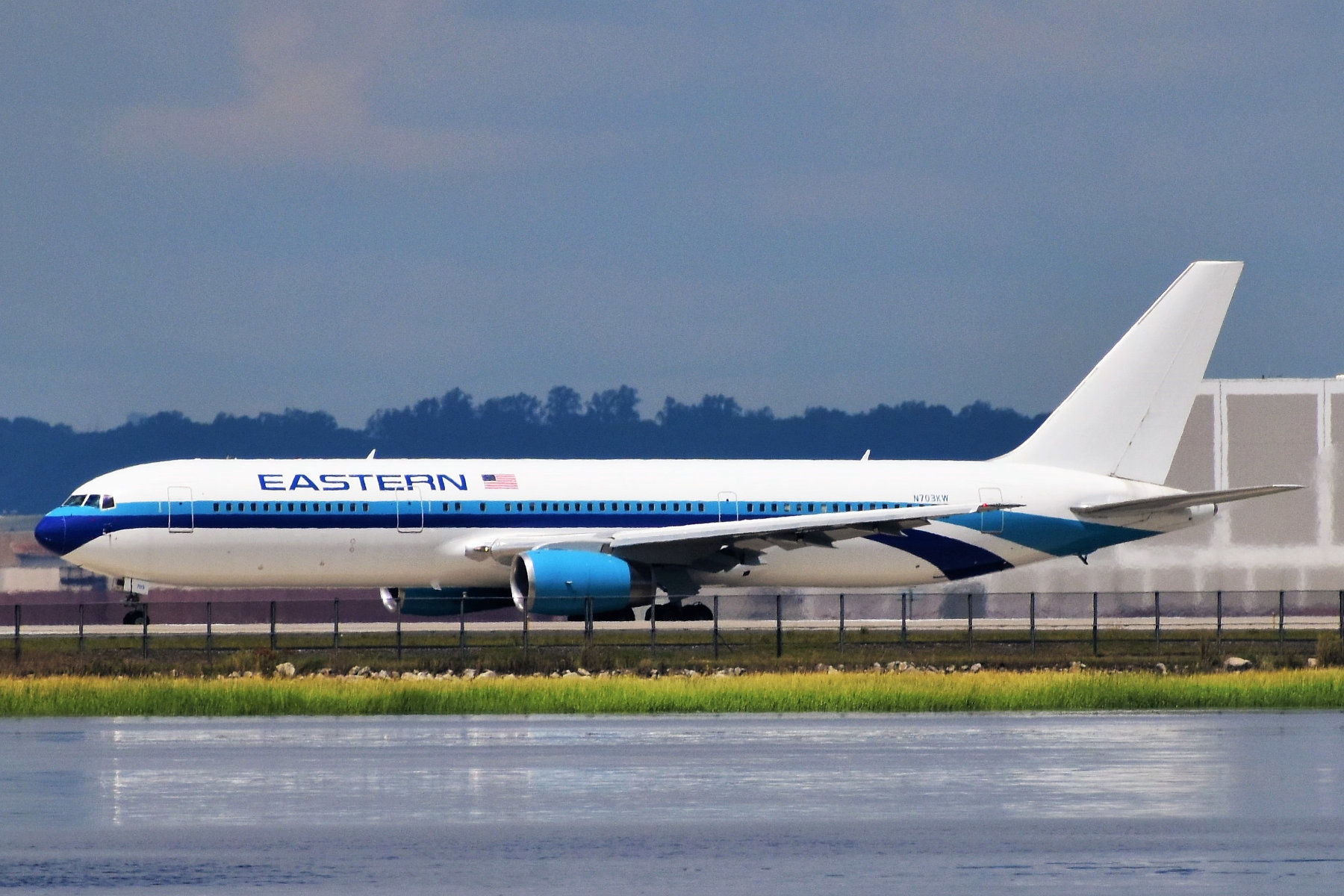
The same aircraft as above in a bare Eastern livery, now registered N703KW, also at JFK Airport, taxiing out for departure on Runway 4L

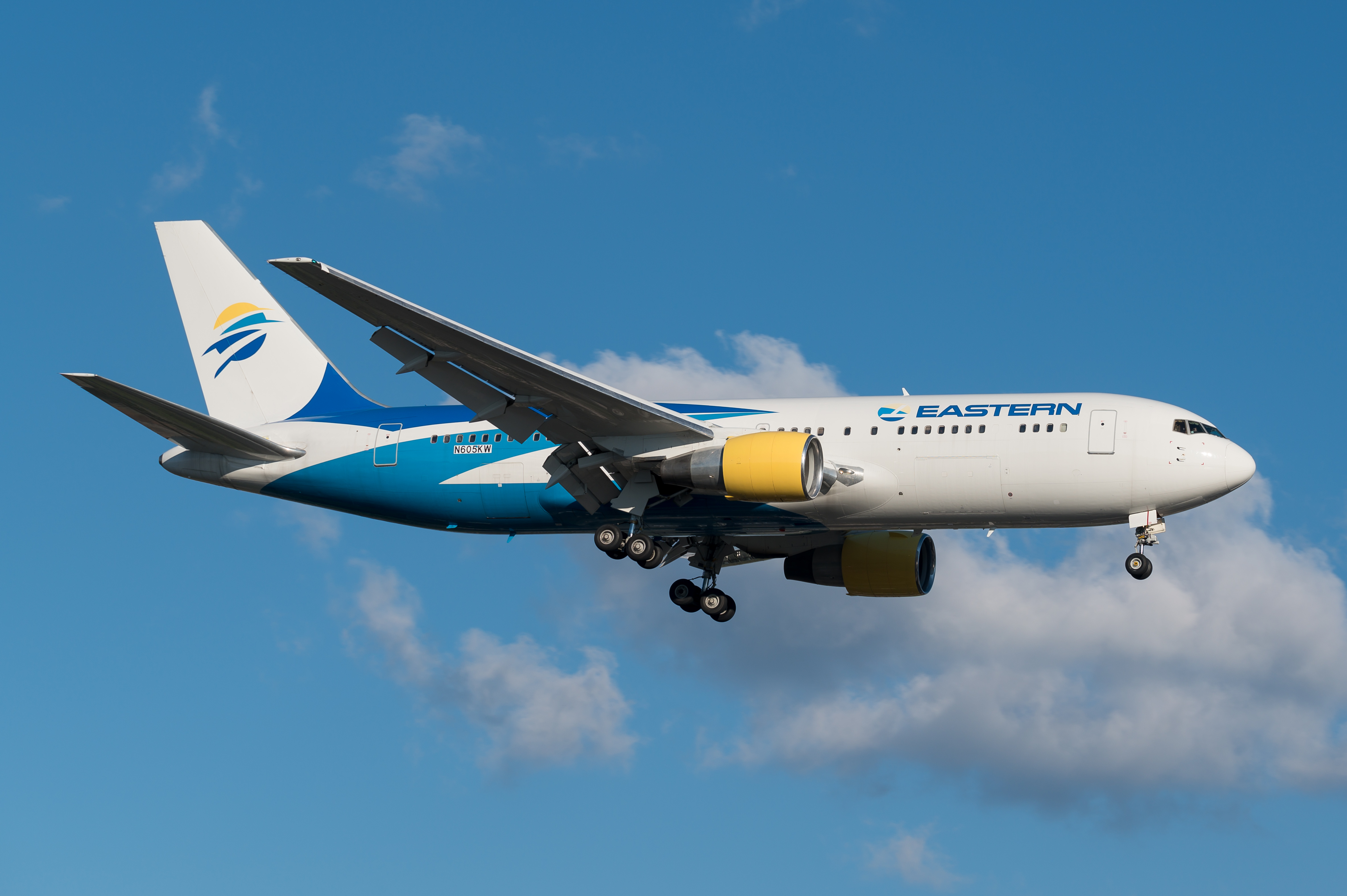
An Eastern Airlines Boeing 767-200ER in a hybrid Eastern/Swift Air livery, 2019

On September 1, 2019, the company moved its headquarter from High Point, North Carolina to Wayne, Pennsylvania. At the end of the month, Eastern joined the British Civil Aviation Authority in the largest-ever peacetime repatriation of British citizens after the collapse of Thomas Cook Airlines, operating flights to bring stranded overseas holidaymakers back to the UK.

On January 12, 2020, Eastern Airlines completed its inaugural scheduled flight to New York from Guayaquil, Ecuador. By May 2020, Eastern planned to purchase several Boeing 767s, with at least five used 777-200s.

On September 1, 2021, Eastern Airlines announced the creation of a new cargo subsidiary named Eastern Air Cargo and the addition of 35 Boeing 777 Freighters to their fleet attempting to capitalize on the post-pandemic e-commerce shopping surge. These aircraft are 'Class-E' freighters or passenger-to-freighter conversions, with seats, galleys, and lavatories removed—but without full structural modifications—allowing quick turnaround and cost-effective service primarily for light-volume e‑commerce shipments.

In May 2023, Eastern Airlines announced its plans to acquire charter airline Hillwood Airways to enter the luxury charter market. It was officially purchased on August 15, 2023, but Hillwood continued to operate under its existing brand until it was renamed as Eastern Air Express on November 13, 2023.

In July 2023, the New England Patriots filed a lawsuit against Eastern Airlines over an alleged breach of contract.

In February 2024, Eastern announced that it had moved its headquarters from Pennsylvania to Kansas City, Missouri, to be close to its cargo and overhaul presence at Kansas City International Airport, and to create more jobs there.

=== Deportation flights ===
Eastern Airlines performs deportation flights under contract for U.S. Immigration and Customs Enforcement, to destinations such as Brazil and Venezuela. N225NE, a Boeing 767 owned by the New England Patriots and with team colors and logos, was flown by Eastern Airlines for deportations to Honduras.

== Ownership ==
Until 2017, Dynamic Airways was owned as follows,

1. Kenneth M. Woolley (50%) - founder and chief information officer (and former CEO) of Extra Space Storage. Woolley also co-owns Swift Air, another Part 121 carrier, in association with Swift Transportation, and is the owner of KMW Leasing, an aircraft leasing firm.
2. Paul Kraus (50%) - owner of Jet Midwest Group, an aircraft leasing firm.

After a successful bankruptcy restructuring in 2017, Dynamic Airways was owned by Olga Alauof (70%) and Woolley (30%).

== Destinations ==
Since December 2023, Eastern Airlines has not operated scheduled flights after canceling its once-monthly Miami to Santo Domingo route.

| Country | City | Airport | Notes | Refs |
|---|---|---|---|---|
| Dominican Republic | Santo Domingo | Las Américas International Airport | Terminated | |
| Ecuador | Guayaquil | José Joaquín de Olmedo International Airport | Terminated | |
| Guyana | Georgetown | Cheddi Jagan International Airport | Terminated | |
| Nicaragua | Managua | Augusto C. Sandino International Airport | Terminated | |
| Paraguay | Asunción | Silvio Pettirossi International Airport | Terminated | |
| United States | Boston | Logan International Airport | Terminated | |
| United States | Miami | Miami International Airport | Terminated | |
| United States | New York City | John F. Kennedy International Airport | Terminated | |
| Uruguay | Montevideo | Carrasco International Airport | Terminated | |

=== Interline agreements ===
- Hahn Air

== Accidents and incidents ==
- On October 29, 2015, Dynamic International Airways Flight 405, a Boeing 767-200ER (registered N251MY), was taxiing at Fort Lauderdale–Hollywood International Airport when its #1 engine caught on fire. Fire crews were dispatched to the scene and all 101 passengers and crew were safely evacuated from the aircraft. 17 passengers and 5 crew members were reported as sustaining injuries. Aircraft operations were briefly suspended at the airport.
- On July 15, 2020, a Boeing 767-300ER (registered N706KW), from New York City to Georgetown, Guyana, taxied off the taxiway at Cheddi Jagan International Airport upon landing, after it vacated Runway 24. Almost immediately after turning onto Taxiway Charlie, the aircraft’s right main landing gear rolled off the pavement and became stuck in the grass. All 201 passengers and 10 crew members were safely evacuated from the aircraft with no injuries.

== See also ==
- Eastern Air Lines
- Eastern Air Lines (2015)
- List of airlines of the United States
