= L-3 Flight International Aviation =

Airline of the United States

Flight International
IATA	ICAO	Call sign
-	RTD	Riptide
- Founded: 1976
- Fleet size: 12
- Parent company: Vertex Aerospace
- Headquarters: Newport News, Virginia, United States
- Website: https://www.vtxaero.com/flight-international/

Vertex Aerospace Flight International Aviation is an American airline based in Newport News, Virginia. It is a Part 135 carrier operating contact charters for US government agencies. Flight International has provided the DoD with realistic threat simulation, AIC training, tracking exercises, and targets for surface and aerial gunnery for more than 35 years. Its main base is Newport News/Williamsburg International Airport with a detachment based at North Island Naval Air Station, CA.

== History ==
The airline is wholly owned by Vertex Aerospace. In 1976, Flight International was founded as an airline training school in Atlanta, GA. The headquarters was moved to Newport News, VA and provided Commercial Air Service programs for the DoD starting in 1979. Flight International is the original company providing Contracted Air Services to the DoD. In 2002, the company was acquired by Raytheon Aerospace which was renamed Vertex Aerospace. In 2003, Vertex Aerospace was acquired by L-3 Communications and the name changed from Flight International Aviation to L-3 Flight International Aviation. In 2017, L-3 Communications became L3 Technologies and then in 2018, L3 sold Vertex Aerospace along with Flight International to American Industrial Partners. The current name of the airline is Flight International Aviation, LLC.
