= Amazon Air =

Cargo airline

Amazon Air (Prime Air)
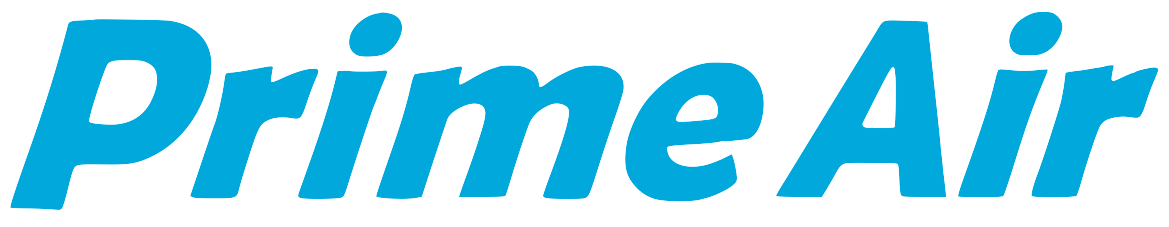

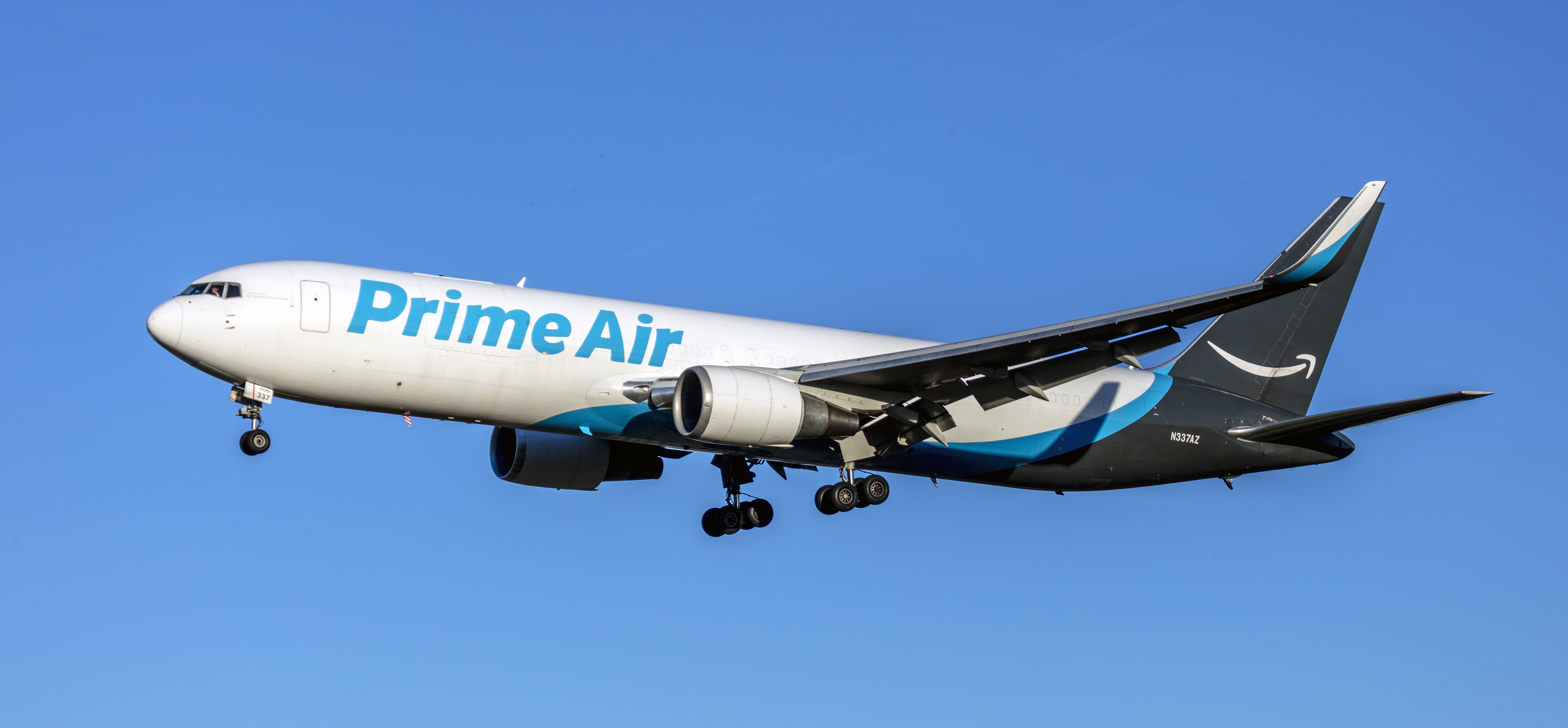
- An Amazon Air Boeing 767-300F
- Founded: 2015; 11 years ago
- Hubs: Cincinnati; Hyderabad; Leipzig/Halle; San Bernardino
- Focus cities: Fort Worth/Alliance; Milan–Malpensa; Ontario; Wilmington
- Fleet size: 101
- Parent company: Amazon
- Key people: Raoul Sreenivasan
- Website: amazon.com/airplanes

Amazon Air (often branded as Prime Air) is a virtual cargo airline primarily focused on transporting Amazon packages. The airline also offers cargo capacity to third-party customers, including through ad hoc, charter, and blocked space services. In 2017, it changed its name from Amazon Prime Air to Amazon Air to differentiate itself from Amazon's Amazon Prime Air autonomous drone delivery service. However, the Prime Air logo remains on the aircraft. Until January 2021, the airline had relied on wet-leasing its aircraft from other operators, but at that time, it had planned to directly own some aircraft. On the planes the airline owns, the airline will still rely on others for CMI (crew, maintenance, and insurance) leases.

== History ==
In late 2015, Amazon began trial cargo runs out of Wilmington Air Park under the code name Project Aerosmith. In December 2015, Amazon announced that it would begin its own cargo airline to expand its capability.

In March 2016, Amazon acquired options to buy up to 19.9 percent of Air Transport Services Group's (ATSG) stock and began scheduled operations with 20 Boeing 767 aircraft.

On January 31, 2017, Amazon announced that Amazon Air would make Cincinnati/Northern Kentucky International Airport (KCVG) its principal hub. Operations began on April 30, 2017. Amazon received $40 million in tax incentives and plans to begin construction on a 920-acre (370 ha) facility with a 3×10^{6} sq ft (69-acre; 28 ha) sorting facility and parking space for over 100 cargo aircraft. At the time, the project was estimated to cost $1.5 billion.

In December 2017, the company, which was named Amazon Prime Air, announced its rebranding as Amazon Air to avoid confusion with the Amazon Prime Air drone delivery service, although the airline continues to operate under the callsign "Prime Air".

As of June 2018, Amazon Air had 20 of its 33 cargo planes based at the Cincinnati/Northern Kentucky International Airport (KCVG), with the rest flying point-to-point transit routes across the United States. Amazon Air was planned to move into office space at the former Comair headquarters by March 2018, but this did not come to fruition.

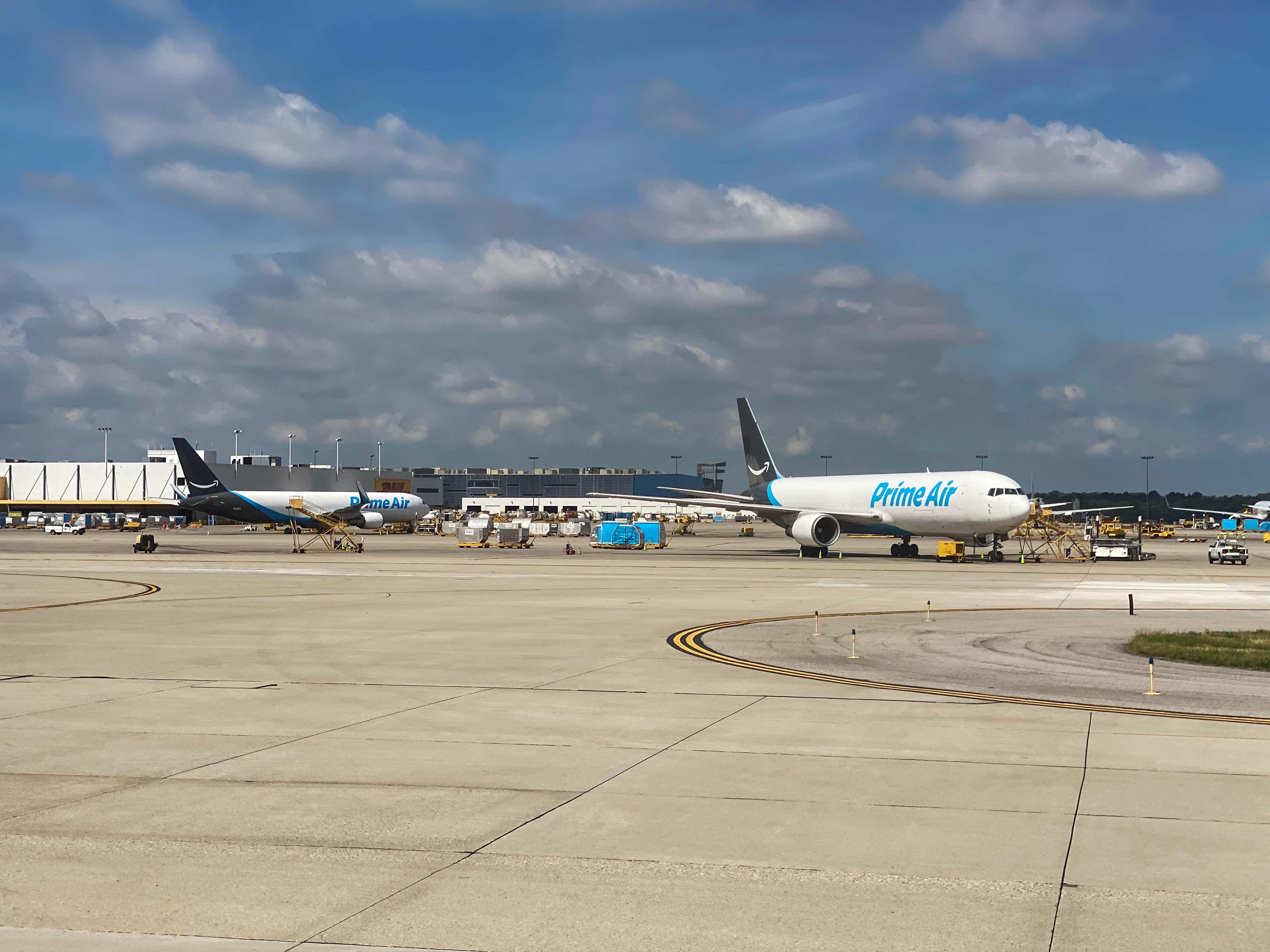
Amazon Air aircraft parked at its main hub at Cincinnati/Northern Kentucky International Airport

Amazon leased 10 additional Boeing 767-300 planes from ATSG in December 2018.

Amazon later created a new regional air hub at Fort Worth Alliance Airport (KAFW), but this hub does not airlift third-party packages. The new regional hub began operating on October 2, 2019.

For 2019 and 2020, Amazon committed to leasing 10 additional 767-300 aircraft from ATSG, which would bring active aircraft to a total of 50. Phase one of the CVG sort facility, encompassing 440 acres (180 ha) was completed in 2020. Phase two, to develop the remaining 479 acres (194 ha), was planned for the 2025–2027 period. Amazon said it eventually plans to have over 100 aircraft based at CVG with over 200 daily flights and 15,000 employees.

In July 2020, Amazon Air had secured up to six million gallons of sustainable aviation fuel (SAF) supplied by Shell Aviation and produced by World Energy.

In September 2020, Amazon committed to buy four aircraft under their own operations. These would be the first owned airplanes rather than leased. The four 767-300 aircraft were previously under the ownership of WestJet, who purchased them from Qantas in 2015. In January 2021, with passenger air traffic severely depressed and cargo traffic higher due to the COVID-19 pandemic, Amazon announced it had purchased 11 Boeing 767-300 aircraft from Delta Air Lines and WestJet.

In March 2021, Amazon exercised its warrants to acquire a minority stake in Air Transport Services Group, the parent company of Amazon Air sub-lessor Air Transport International. The deal was valued at US$131 million for 13.5 million shares in the company. Amazon also holds warrants to acquire a minority stake in Atlas Air Worldwide Holdings, the parent company of Atlas Air.

In September 2022, a study conducted by the Chaddick Institute found that Amazon Air had a system expansion of 5.8% without having added any additional warehouses. The study also showed that in the same year, the carry capacity had increased, making it 14% and 23% as large as FedEx Express and UPS Airlines, respectively.

In October 2022, Amazon announced the lease of ten Airbus A330-300P2F freighters from Altavair to be operated by Hawaiian Airlines. These aircraft were planned to be converted to freighters by Elbe Flugzeugwerke, and the first of these aircraft was slated to join the fleet in late 2023.

In January 2023, Amazon launched Amazon Prime Air in India in partnership with QuikJet. The service planned to use two, branded Boeing 737-800 freighters to deliver goods in four metro cities: Delhi, Mumbai, Hyderabad, and Bengaluru. The company said it had planned to increase the number of dedicated freighters in India to six by the end of 2023, and that it would also continue to utilize the cargo space of other passenger airlines.

On 14 September 2026, Amazon suspended 21 Air's Amazon Air operations, revoking their ability to haul Amazon packages, following the fatal tragedy that caused five deaths.

Air Transport Services Group will acquire and convert 30 Airbus A330 aircraft into freighters for Amazon's air network, with operation expected to start in 2027.

== Function ==
Amazon Air’s primary function is to transport Amazon packages from distant fulfillment centers that are outside of Amazon's local ground linehaul network for a specific area. Once the buyer's order is flown from the distant fulfillment center to the buyer's region, the package may be transported to the regional Amazon Sortation Center to be routed either to a local Amazon Logistics Delivery Station for last mile delivery or to a local Post Office for last mile delivery by the United States Postal Service. Some Amazon Air packages bypass the regional Amazon Sortation Centers completely and are routed directly to local Amazon Delivery Stations for last mile delivery by Amazon Logistics.

== Destinations ==
Amazon Air flies scheduled flights to the following destinations (Belfast International, UK is not on the table):

Hubs/focus cities *
Terminated destinations #

| Country | City | IATA code | ICAO code | Airport | Notes |
|---|---|---|---|---|---|
| Canada (Alberta) | Calgary | YYC | CYYC | Calgary International Airport | |
| Canada (Alberta) | Edmonton | YEG | CYEG | Edmonton International Airport | |
| Canada (British Columbia) | Vancouver | YVR | CYVR | Vancouver International Airport | |
| Canada (Ontario) | Hamilton | YHM | CYHM | John C. Munro Hamilton International Airport | |
| France | Paris | CDG | LFPG | Charles de Gaulle Airport | |
| Germany | Cologne | CGN | EDDK | Cologne Bonn Airport | |
| Germany | Hanover | HAJ | EDDV | Hannover Airport | |
| Germany | Leipzig | LEJ | EDDP | Leipzig/Halle Airport * | |
| India | Bangalore | BLR | VOBL | Kempegowda International Airport | |
| India | Coimbatore | CJB | VOCB | Coimbatore International Airport | |
| India | Delhi | DEL | VIDP | Indira Gandhi International Airport | |
| India | Hyderabad | HYD | VOHS | Rajiv Gandhi International Airport * | |
| India | Mumbai | BOM | VABB | Chhatrapati Shivaji Maharaj International Airport | |
| Italy | Cagliari | CAG | LIEE | Cagliari Elmas Airport | |
| Italy | Catania | CTA | LICC | Catania–Fontanarossa Airport | |
| Italy | Milan | MXP | LIMC | Milan Malpensa Airport | |
| Italy | Rome | FCO | LIRF | Leonardo da Vinci–Fiumicino Airport | |
| Italy | Brescia | VBS | LIPO | Brescia Airport | |
| Poland | Katowice | KTW | EPKT | Katowice Airport | |
| Spain | Barcelona | BCN | LEBL | Josep Tarradellas Barcelona–El Prat Airport | |
| Spain | Gran Canaria | LPA | GCLP | Gran Canaria Airport | |
| Spain | Madrid | MAD | LEMD | Adolfo Suárez Madrid–Barajas Airport | |
| Turkey | Istanbul | IST | LTFM | Istanbul Airport | |
| United Kingdom | Bournemouth | BOH | EGHH | Bournemouth Airport | |
| United Kingdom | Castle Donington | EMA | EGNX | East Midlands Airport | |
| United Kingdom | London | SEN | EGMC | London Southend Airport | |
| United States (Alabama) | Mobile | BFM | KBFM | Mobile International Airport | |
| United States (Alaska) | Anchorage | ANC | PANC | Ted Stevens Anchorage International Airport | |
| United States (Alaska) | Fairbanks | FAI | PAFA | Fairbanks International Airport | |
| United States (Arizona) | Phoenix | PHX | KPHX | Phoenix Sky Harbor International Airport | |
| United States (California) | Ontario | ONT | KONT | Ontario International Airport | |
| United States (California) | Riverside | RIV | KRIV | March Air Reserve Base | |
| United States (California) | Sacramento | SMF | KSMF | Sacramento International Airport | |
| United States (California) | San Bernardino | SBD | KSBD | San Bernardino International Airport * | |
| United States (California) | San Francisco | SFO | KSFO | San Francisco International Airport | |
| United States (California) | Stockton | SCK | KSCK | Stockton Metropolitan Airport | |
| United States (Colorado) | Denver | DEN | KDEN | Denver International Airport | |
| United States (Connecticut) | Hartford | BDL | KBDL | Bradley International Airport | |
| United States (Florida) | Miami | MIA | KMIA | Miami International Airport | |
| United States (Florida) | Lakeland | LAL | KLAL | Lakeland Linder International Airport | |
| United States (Florida) | Tampa | TPA | KTPA | Tampa International Airport | |
| United States (Georgia) | Atlanta | ATL | KATL | Hartsfield–Jackson Atlanta International Airport | |
| United States (Hawaii) | Honolulu | HNL | PHNL | Daniel K. Inouye International Airport | |
| United States (Hawaii) | Kahului/Maui | OGG | PHOG | Kahului Airport | |
| United States (Hawaii) | Kona | KOA | PHKO | Ellison Onizuka Kona International Airport at Keahole | |
| United States (Illinois) | Chicago | ORD | KORD | Chicago O'Hare International Airport | |
| United States (Illinois) | Chicago/Rockford | RFD | KRFD | Chicago Rockford International Airport | |
| United States (Indiana) | Fort Wayne | FWA | KFWA | Fort Wayne International Airport | |
| United States (Indiana) | South Bend | SBN | KSBN | South Bend International Airport | |
| United States (Iowa) | Des Moines | DSM | KDSM | Des Moines International Airport | |
| United States (Kansas) | Wichita | ICT | KICT | Wichita Dwight D. Eisenhower National Airport | |
| United States (Louisiana) | New Orleans | MSY | KMSY | Louis Armstrong New Orleans International Airport | |
| United States (Maryland) | Baltimore | BWI | KBWI | Baltimore/Washington International Thurgood Marshall Airport | |
| United States (Minnesota) | Minneapolis | MSP | KMSP | Minneapolis–Saint Paul International Airport | |
| United States (Missouri) | Kansas City | MCI | KMCI | Kansas City International Airport | |
| United States (Missouri) | St. Louis | STL | KSTL | St. Louis Lambert International Airport | |
| United States (Nebraska) | Omaha | OMA | KOMA | Eppley Airfield | |
| United States (New Hampshire) | Manchester | MHT | KMHT | Manchester-Boston Regional Airport | |
| United States (New Mexico) | Albuquerque | ABQ | KABQ | Albuquerque International Sunport | |
| United States (New York) | New York | JFK | KJFK | John F. Kennedy International Airport | |
| United States (North Carolina) | Charlotte | CLT | KCLT | Charlotte Douglas International Airport | |
| United States (Ohio) | Toledo | TOL | KTOL | Toledo Express Airport | |
| United States (Ohio) | Wilmington | ILN | KILN | Airborne Airpark | |
| United States (Ohio/Kentucky) | Cincinnati/Covington | CVG | KCVG | Cincinnati/Northern Kentucky International Airport * | |
| United States (Oregon) | Portland | PDX | KPDX | Portland International Airport | |
| United States (Pennsylvania) | Allentown | ABE | KABE | Lehigh Valley International Airport | |
| United States (Pennsylvania) | Pittsburgh | PIT | KPIT | Pittsburgh International Airport | |
| United States (Puerto Rico) | San Juan | SJU | TJSJ | Luis Muñoz Marín International Airport | |
| United States (Rhode Island) | Providence | PVD | KPVD | Rhode Island T. F. Green International Airport # | |
| United States (Tennessee) | Nashville | BNA | KBNA | Nashville International Airport | |
| United States (Texas) | Austin | AUS | KAUS | Austin-Bergstrom International Airport | |
| United States (Texas) | Dallas/Fort Worth | DFW | KDFW | Dallas/Fort Worth International Airport | |
| United States (Texas) | Fort Worth | AFW | KAFW | Perot Field Fort Worth Alliance Airport * | |
| United States (Texas) | Houston | IAH | KIAH | George Bush Intercontinental Airport | |
| United States (Texas) | San Antonio | SKF | KSKF | Kelly Field | |
| United States (Virginia) | Richmond | RIC | KRIC | Richmond International Airport | |
| United States (Washington) | Seattle/Tacoma | SEA | KSEA | Seattle–Tacoma International Airport | |
| United States (Washington) | Spokane | GEG | KGEG | Spokane International Airport | |

== Fleet ==
Amazon Air transports on Airbus A330, Boeing 737 and Boeing 767 aircraft, all of which are operated by contracted partners. As of January 2025, the Amazon Air fleet consists of the following aircraft.

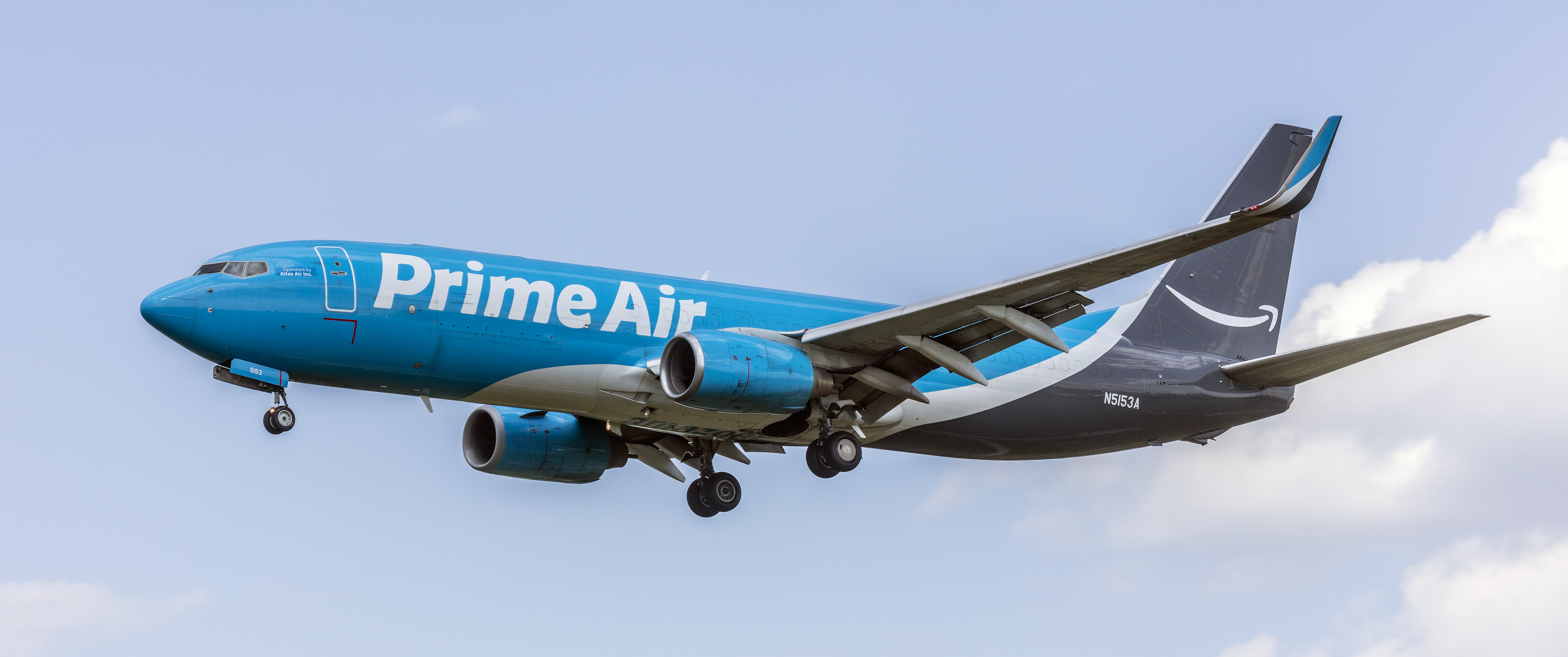
An Amazon Air Boeing 737-800BCF operated by Atlas Air

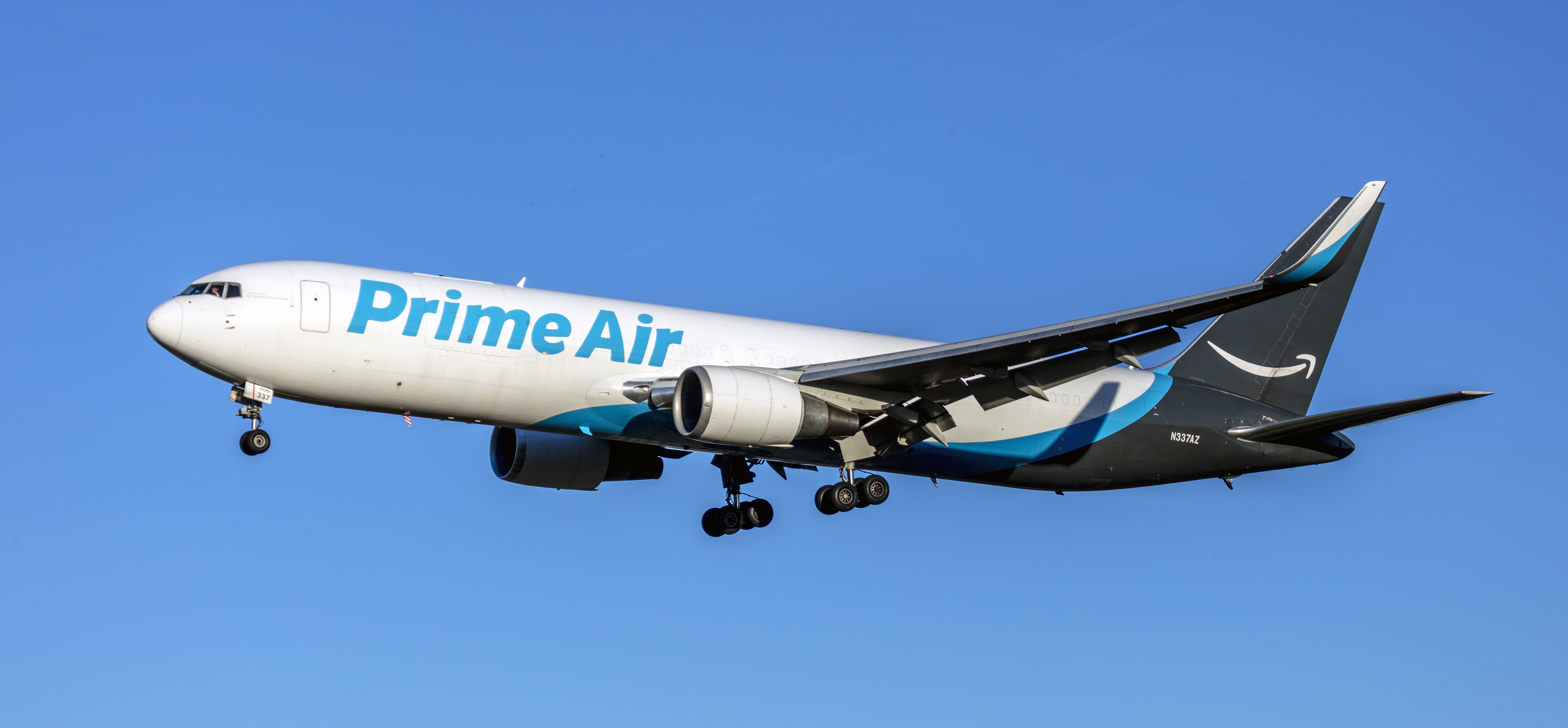
An Amazon Air Boeing 767-300F operated by Air Transport International

Current Amazon Air fleet
| Aircraft | In service | | Orders | Operator | Notes |
|---|---|---|---|---|---|
| Airbus A330-300P2F | 10 | | — | Hawaiian Airlines | |
| Boeing 737-800BCF | 31 | 8 | — | Atlas Air | |
| Boeing 737-800BCF | 31 | 9 | — | ASL Airlines Ireland | |
| Boeing 737-800BCF | 31 | 2 | — | QuikJet Airlines | |
| Boeing 737-800BCF | 31 | 12 | — | Sun Country Airlines | |
| Boeing 767-300F | 60 | 41 | — | Air Transport International | One crashed as Atlas Air Flight 3591. One crashed as 21 Air Flight 7598. |
| Boeing 767-300F | 60 | 17 | — | Atlas Air | One crashed as Atlas Air Flight 3591. One crashed as 21 Air Flight 7598. |
| Boeing 767-300F | 60 | 2 | — | Cargojet Airways | One crashed as Atlas Air Flight 3591. One crashed as 21 Air Flight 7598. |
| Boeing 767-300F | 60 | ? | — | 21 Air | One crashed as Atlas Air Flight 3591. One crashed as 21 Air Flight 7598. |
| Total | 101 | | — | | |

Retired Amazon Air fleet
| Aircraft | Total | Introduced | Retired | Operator | Notes |
|---|---|---|---|---|---|
| ATR 72-500F | 5 | 2021 | 2023 | Silver Airways | Retired on July 8, 2023, after Amazon ended all connections with the operator. |

== Accidents and incidents ==
- On February 23, 2019, Atlas Air Flight 3591 (a Boeing 767-300BCF, operating for Amazon Air) crashed into Trinity Bay near Anahuac, Texas. The crash occurred approximately 30 miles (48 km) southeast of George Bush Intercontinental Airport while the aircraft was on approach to the airport. The aircraft was operating a regularly scheduled trip from Miami International Airport to George Bush Intercontinental. All three people on board (two crew members and one passenger) were killed. This was the first fatal accident involving the Boeing 767F.
- On November 19, 2024, a Cargojet Boeing 767-300F, operating for Amazon Air, overran the north runway at Vancouver International Airport and slid into the grass while landing around 1:45 am. No injuries were reported, but the aircraft was substantially damaged.
- On September 6, 2026, 21 Air Flight 7598, a Boeing 767-300F registered N1997A operating for Amazon Air, overran runway 30 while landing at Miami International Airport at 1:58 pm. It struck multiple vehicles and crashed, catching on fire in the process. As a result, five were killed and five — including the two pilots — were injured.

== Further media ==
Videos

- CNBC: As Amazon Air Expands, FedEx And UPS May Suffer on YouTube
