= Havana Air =

United States airline

- Founded: 2007
- Commenced operations: 2007
- Ceased operations: 2017 (as an airline)
- Hubs: Miami International Airport
- Destinations: 5
- Headquarters: Miami-Dade County, Florida, United States
- Key people: Mark Elias (COO)
- Website: www.havanaair.com

ViajeHoy, LLC trading as Havana Air is a virtual airline offering scheduled charter services from Miami and Tampa, United States to Cuba. The company was founded in the United States in 2007 and specializes in tourism to Cuba from the United States.

In 2025, Havana Air filed for Chapter 11 bankruptcy protection, blaming immigration policies imposed by the second Trump administration.

== Destinations ==
Havana Air serves several cities in Cuba. Since March 2020, the US government restricted flights from the US to Havana only. President Joe Biden reverted the Trump’s administration restrictions on flights to Cuba.

Country	City	Airport	Notes
Cuba	Havana	José Martí International Airport	
Cuba	Holguín	Frank País Airport	
Cuba	Santa Clara	Abel Santa Maria Airport	
United States	Miami	Miami International Airport	Hub
United States	Tampa	Tampa International Airport	

== See also ==
- List of airlines of the United States
