= Ogden–Hinckley Airport =

Airport near Ogden, Utah, United States

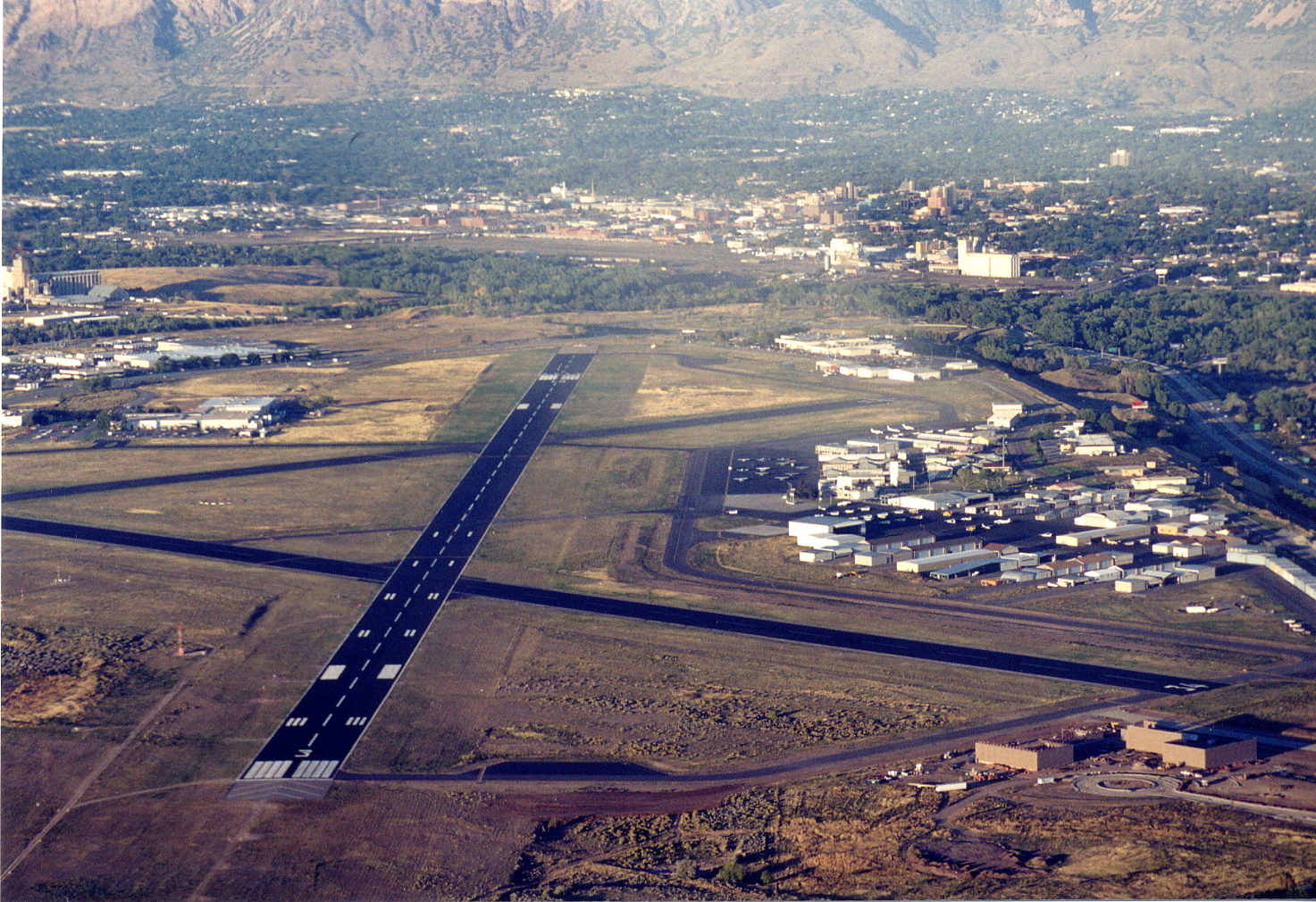
- IATA: OGD; ICAO: KOGD; FAA LID: OGD

Summary
- Airport type: Public
- Owner: Ogden City Corporation
- Serves: Ogden–Clearfield metropolitan area
- Elevation AMSL: 4,473 ft (1,363 m)
- Coordinates: 41°11′44″N 112°00′47″W
- Website: www.flyogden.com

Maps
- FAA airport diagram as of January 2021
- Interactive map of Ogden–Hinckley Airport

Runways
Direction	Length		Surface
Direction	ft	m	Surface
3/21	8,103	2,470	Asphalt
17/35	5,195	1,583	Asphalt

Statistics (2019)
- Aircraft operations: 113,663
- Based aircraft: 241
- Source: Federal Aviation Administration

Ogden–Hinckley Airport (IATA: OGD, ICAO: KOGD, FAA LID: OGD) is a public airport four miles southwest of Ogden, in Weber County, Utah, United States. The National Plan of Integrated Airport Systems for 2019–2023 categorized it as a commercial service primary non-hub airport. Formerly Ogden Municipal Airport, it is billed as Utah's busiest municipal airport for private planes.

The airport has an FAA control tower with radar approach service by Salt Lake City TRACON.

== History ==
During World War II, the airfield was used by the United States Army Air Forces.

Commercial service began when Western Airlines arrived in 1944, operating a route between Los Angeles and Great Falls, Montana. Ogden was one of many stops on the route falling between Salt Lake City and Pocatello, Idaho. United Airlines began serving Ogden in 1946 as one of many stops on a transcontinental route between San Francisco and New York. Both carriers pulled out in 1959. West Coast Airlines replaced them until it pulled out in 1961. In 1964, Thunderbird Airlines began air-taxi flights to Salt Lake City. The carrier changed names to Key Airlines in 1969 and again to Sun Valley Key in 1972. All service ended by 1976, and Ogden saw no other service for the next 36 years.

Service at the airport resumed in 2012, with Allegiant Air launching service to Phoenix–Mesa Gateway Airport in September of that year. Nearly a decade later, Avelo Airlines announced it would begin service from Ogden to Los Angeles’ Hollywood Burbank Airport on May 4, 2021. Both airlines ended their service at the airport in 2022. Allegiant Air citied a shortage of pilots, and Avelo noted a high fuel price. The two airlines departing allowed the city to accelerate the previously scheduled renovation work, including construction of a new control tower and expanding the airport by several thousand square feet. Service resumed again on February 21, 2024, with Breeze Airways beginning service to Santa Ana's John Wayne Airport.

== Facilities ==
Ogden-Hinckley Airport covers 721 acres (291 ha) at an elevation of 4,473 feet (1,363 m). It has two asphalt runways: 3/21 is 8,103 by 150 feet (2,470 by 46 m); 17/35 is 5,195 by 100 feet (1,583 by 30 m). Note: Runway 7/25 was decommissioned by the FAA at the request of OGD in 2016.

In 2022 the airport had 108,023 aircraft operations, average 296 per day: 96.1% general aviation, less than 1% military, and 3.6% airline / air taxi. 308 aircraft were then based at the airport: 80% single-engine, 10% multi-engine, 3% helicopter, 7% jet.

In 2025 the airport had 124,278 aircraft operations, averaging 341 per day: 71.4% general aviation, 28.3% air taxi, less than 1% airline, and less than 1% military. As of May 2026, 335 aircraft were based at the airport.

== Airlines and destinations ==
Airlines	Destinations	Refs
Breeze Airways	Orange County	

== Accidents and incidents ==
- On December 18, 1953, a United States Air Force B-29 Superfortress intending to land at Hill Air Force Base landed at Ogden Municipal Airport by mistake. One of the eight crew was killed when the aircraft crashed and caught fire.
- On January 16, 2020, a twin-engine Cessna approaching the airport clipped a house and crashed, killing the pilot.

== See also ==
- List of airports in Utah
- Utah World War II Army Airfields
