= Civil Reserve Air Fleet =

Non-military aircraft contracting with the US military to act as emergency transports

Civil Reserve Air Fleet
- Active: 1952–present
- Country: United States
- Size: 450 aircraft as of 2022
- Part of: Air Mobility Command

Insignia
- CRAF emblem

The Civil Reserve Air Fleet (CRAF) is part of the United States's mobility resources. Selected aircraft from U.S. airlines, contractually committed to Civil Reserve Air Fleet, support United States Department of Defense airlift requirements in emergencies when the need for airlift exceeds the capability of available military aircraft.

== History ==
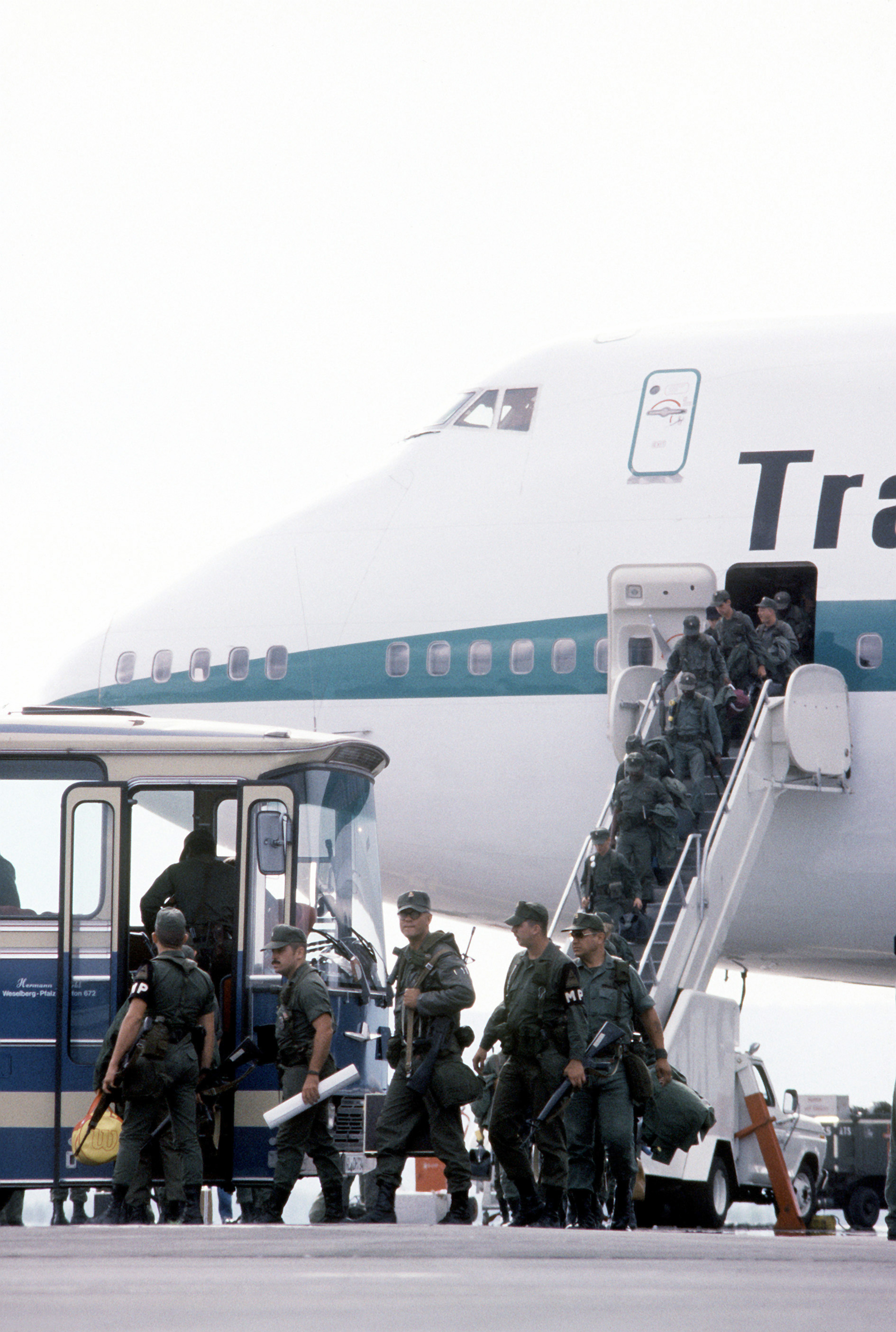
Troops of the 502nd Supply and Transportation Battalion arrive by a Civil Reserve Air Fleet aircraft to participate in the exercise Reforger 1980. The airplane on this photo was a Boeing 747 of Transamerica Airlines.

In 1952, after aircraft were commandeered for the Berlin Airlift, the Civil Reserve Air Fleet (CRAF) was created as a more orderly way of serving emergency military needs.

The Fleet has two main segments: international and national (domestic).

CRAF has been activated three times. The first activation was as part of Operation Desert Shield. The second was once as part of Operation Iraqi Freedom. In 2021 it was activated as part of Operation Allies Refuge in Afghanistan.

== Membership commitment and requirements ==
The airlines contractually pledge aircraft to the various segments of Civil Reserve Air Fleet, ready for activation when needed. Each stage of the CRAF activation is only used to the extent necessary to provide the amount of civil augmentation airlift needed by DOD. When the carrier is notified of CRAF activation, the carrier must have aircraft and qualified aircrews ready to support within 24 to 72 hours, depending on which CRAF stage is activated.

To provide incentives for civil carriers to commit aircraft to the Civil Reserve Air Fleet program and to assure the United States of adequate airlift reserves, the government makes peacetime Department of Defense (DoD) airlift business available to civilian airlines that offer aircraft to the Civil Reserve Air Fleet. DoD offers business through the International Airlift Services. For fiscal year 2005, the guaranteed portion of the contract was $418 million. Air Mobility Command (AMC) previously reported that throughout fiscal 2005 it planned to award more than $1.5 billion in additional business beyond the guaranteed portion of the contract.

To join the Civil Reserve Air Fleet, carriers must maintain a minimum commitment of 40% of its Civil Reserve Air Fleet capable passenger and cargo fleet. Aircraft committed must be US registered, and carriers must commit and maintain at least four complete crews for each aircraft.

== Fleet ==
As of September 2022, the Civil Reserve Air Fleet consists of 450 aircraft from 25 airlines. This breaks down to 413 aircraft for international operations, with 268 considered to be in the "long-range international" category and 145 in the "short-range international" section, as well as 37 aircraft in the "national" segment. These numbers are subject to change on a monthly basis.

== Contracts ==
The U.S. Department of Defense regularly issues contracts and task orders within the Civil Air Reserve Fleet program. For example, on 1 October 2018, U.S. Transportation Command issued millions of dollars of task orders to members of the Civil Air Reserve Fleet. On 1 October 2019, U.S. Transportation Command again issued millions of dollars of task orders to members of the Civil Air Reserve Fleet for charter airlift services. Less than one year's worth of Civil Air Reserve Fleet operations (18 November 2015 through 30 September 2016) was worth roughly $357 million.

== Membership ==
The following air carriers are members of the Civil Reserve Air Fleet as of January 2023:

=== Long-range international ===
- ABX Air
- Air Transport International
- American Airlines
- Amerijet International
- Atlas Air
- Delta Air Lines
- FedEx Express
- Hawaiian Airlines
- Kalitta Air
- National Airlines
- Omni Air International
- Polar Air Cargo
- United Airlines
- UPS Airlines
- Western Global Airlines
- Southern Air

=== Short-range international ===
- ABX Air
- Alaska Airlines
- Amerijet International
- Delta Air Lines
- Eastern Airlines
- JetBlue Airways
- Lynden Air Cargo
- National Airlines
- Northern Air Cargo
- Sun Country Airlines
- United Airlines

=== Domestic ===
- Allegiant Air
- Everts Air Cargo
- Southwest Airlines
