= Florida West International Airways =

| IATA | ICAO | Call sign |
|---|---|---|
| RF | FWL | FLO WEST |
- Founded: January 1984; 41 years ago (as Florida West Airlines)
- Ceased operations: February 28, 2017; 8 years ago
- Hubs: Miami International Airport
- Subsidiaries: Tradewinds Airlines (1994-1995)
- Fleet size: 2
- Destinations: 15
- Parent company: Atlas Air Worldwide Holdings
- Headquarters: Miami, United States
- Key people: Mansour Rasnavad (President and CEO)
- Employees: 66 (2014)
- Website: www.fwia.com

Florida West International Airways, Inc. (often abbreviated as FWIA) was an American cargo airline based at Miami, Florida. It operated scheduled and charter services worldwide, with its main markets in Latin America, the Caribbean and the United States. The airline later became a subsidiary of the Atlas Air Worldwide Holdings.

== History ==
The airline was founded in 1981 as a repair station at Miami Airport named Pan Aero International. It changed its name in January 1984 to Florida West Airlines.

On February 28, 1994, Florida West acquired Tradewinds Airlines. After the airline filed for bankruptcy on October 11, 1994, its assets were sold and it was rebranded as Florida West International Airways the following year, restarting operations on March 12, 1996.

In December 2000, LAN Airlines purchased 25% stake of the airline.

On April 7, 2016, Atlas Air Worldwide Holdings, along with Southern Air, acquired Florida West International. On February 28, 2017, Atlas Air Worldwide Holdings shut down Florida West International, with the U.S. Department of Transportation cancelling their cargo carrier's certificates of authority on March 27.

== Destinations ==
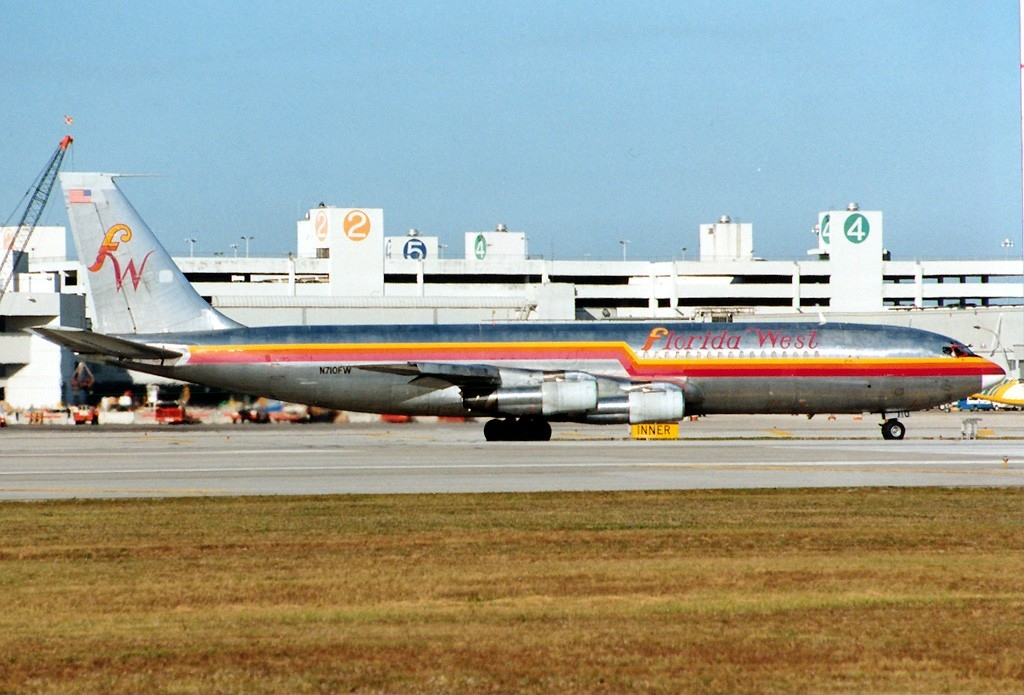
A Florida West Boeing 707-320C at Miami International Airport in 1992

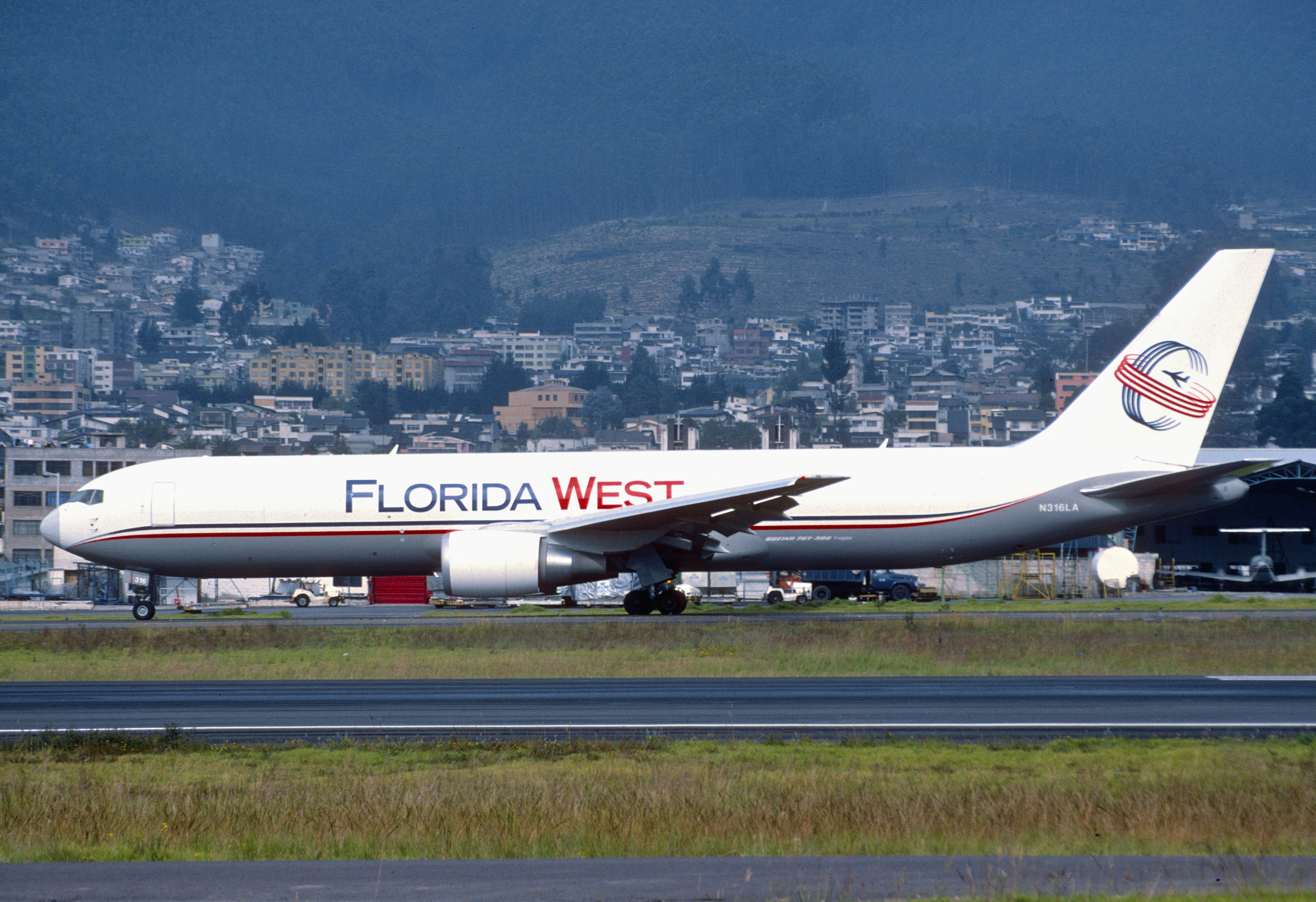
A Florida West Boeing 767-300F at the Old Mariscal Sucre International Airport in 2002

| Country | City | Airport | Notes |
|---|---|---|---|
| Bolivia | Santa Cruz de la Sierra | Viru Viru International Airport | |
| Brazil | Curitiba | Afonso Pena International Airport | |
| Brazil | Manaus | Eduardo Gomes International Airport | |
| Chile | Santiago | Arturo Merino Benítez International Airport | |
| Colombia | Bogotá | El Dorado International Airport | |
| Colombia | Medellín | José María Córdova International Airport | |
| Costa Rica | San José | Juan Santamaria International Airport | |
| Ecuador | Guayaquil | José Joaquín de Olmedo International Airport | |
| Ecuador | Quito | Mariscal Sucre International Airport | |
| Guatemala | Guatemala City | La Aurora International Airport | |
| Panama | Panama City | Tocumen International Airport | |
| Paraguay | Asunción | Silvio Pettirossi International Airport | |
| United States | Miami | Miami International Airport | Hub |
| United States | New York City | John F. Kennedy International Airport | |
| Uruguay | Montevideo | Carrasco International Airport | |

== Fleet ==
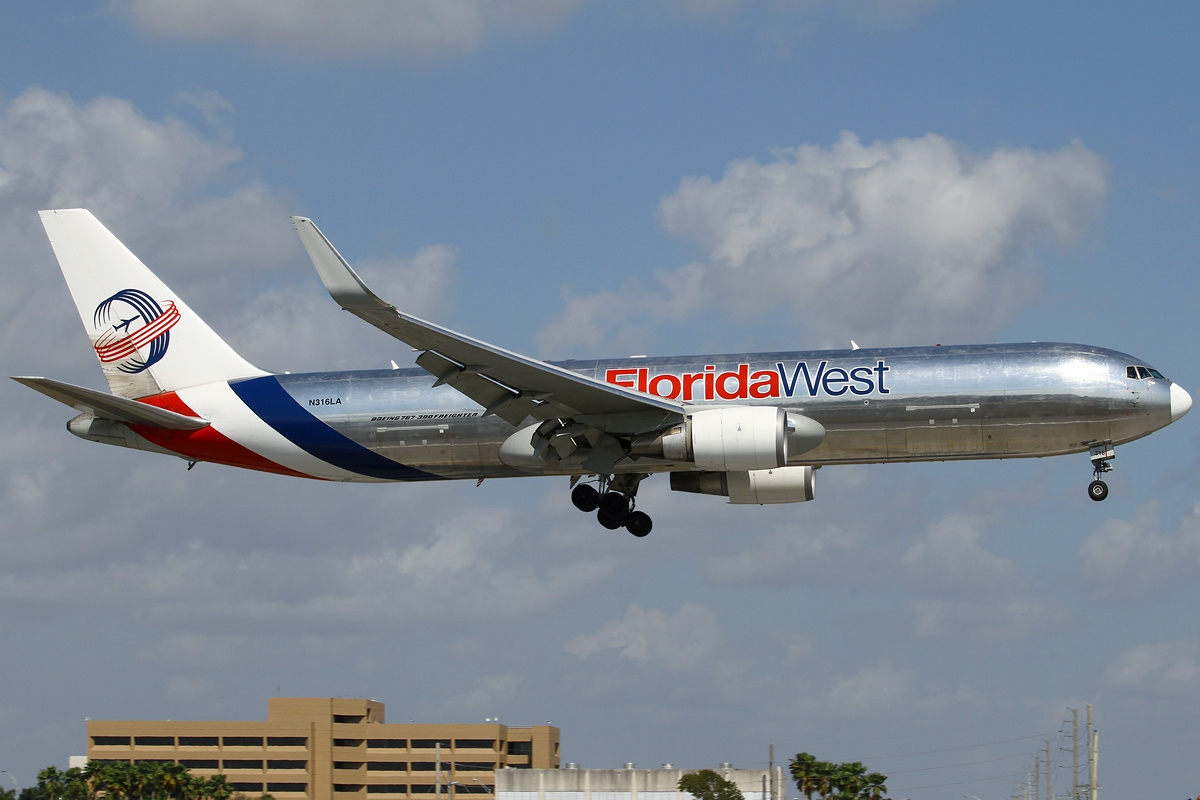
A Florida West Boeing 767-300F landing at Miami International Airport in 2013

Florida West International Airways operated the following aircraft:

Florida West International Airways fleet
| Aircraft | Total | Introduced | Retired | Notes |
|---|---|---|---|---|
| Boeing 707-320C | 14 | 1984 | 1995 | |
| Boeing 727-100F | 1 | 1994 | 1994 | |
| Boeing 727-200F | 4 | 1993 | 1995 | |
| Boeing 767-300F | 2 | 2001 | 2015 | |
| Douglas DC-8-61F | 1 | 1996 | 2000 | Transferred to Mas Air |
| Douglas DC-8-71F | 2 | 1999 | 2002 | Transferred to Mas Air |

== See also ==
- Atlas Air
- List of defunct airlines of the United States
