= Southern Air =

Cargo airline of the United States (1999–2021)

IATA	ICAO	Call sign
9S	SOO	SOUTHERN AIR
- Founded: March 5, 1999; 27 years ago
- Commenced operations: November 1999; 26 years ago
- Ceased operations: November 17, 2021; 4 years ago (merged into Atlas Air)
- AOC #: Q2SA131J
- Hubs: Cincinnati; Los Angeles
- Fleet size: 10 (at the time of merger)
- Destinations: Global
- Parent company: Atlas Air Worldwide Holdings
- Headquarters: Florence, Kentucky, United States
- Website: www.southernair.com

Southern Air Inc. was a global air cargo carrier headquartered in Florence, Kentucky. It was the first airline to provide wet leasing (ACMI) services using the wide-body Boeing 777F freighter. On November 17, 2021, Southern Air ceased operations upon its merger into Atlas Air.

The airline operated an all-Boeing fleet of aircraft, including the Boeing 777F and the Boeing 737-800BCF. Its wide range of services included long-term wet leasing (ACMI), on-demand commercial charters, and Department of Defense Civil Reserve Air Fleet. Southern Air's operations also supported some of the world's largest combination carriers as well as government agencies and non-government organizations.

== History ==
The airline was established on March 5, 1999, by James Neff, out of the assets of Southern Air Transport. The carrier started operations in November 1999.

On September 7, 2007, Oak Hill Capital Partners acquired majority ownership of Southern Air and merged Cargo 360 into the airline.

2009 Southern Air provided contract air lift support services, for the military buildup throughout Afghanistan. Heavy Air Lift Support charters were contracted by the United States Department of Defense and the United States Air Force Air Mobility Command and its NATO Allies through the Civil Reserve Air Fleet program. Areas of operation was provided for air lift services to and from Maguire, Dover, Hickam, Travis, Stanstead, Rammstein, Aviano, Oman, Osan, Guam, Yokota air bases. With multiple On Demand Flights into Bagram, Camp Bastion, Kabul, Kandahar and Mazar-e Sharif airbases in Afghanistan. These contract services were provided during Military Operation Enduring Freedom, and the Global War on Terrorism.

In early 2010, Southern Air took delivery of two Boeing 777F freighters. At the same time, Southern Air introduced a new aircraft livery as well as new corporate branding.

In early 2011, Southern Air entered into a multiple year contract with DHL Aviation; by utilizing the Boeing 777, Southern Air was able to augment DHL's overnight express package delivery service through hubs in Cincinnati, Bahrain, Hong Kong and Anchorage, increasing package delivery options provided by DHL to its customers.

The same year, Southern Air gradually retired its fleet of Boeing 747-200, 747-300 and 747-400BDSF models.

On 28 September 2012, Southern Air filed for Chapter 11 bankruptcy protection and emerged from bankruptcy in early 2013.

In 2014, Southern Air took delivery of five Boeing 737-400SF passenger-to-cargo converted aircraft.

On April 7, 2016, Atlas Air Worldwide Holdings purchased Southern Air for $110 million in an all-cash deal. The transaction included Worldwide Air Logistics Group and its two operating subsidiaries; Southern Air and Florida West International Airways

On November 17, 2021, Southern Air became fully integrated into Atlas Air through an airline merger, ending a long history of airline operations.

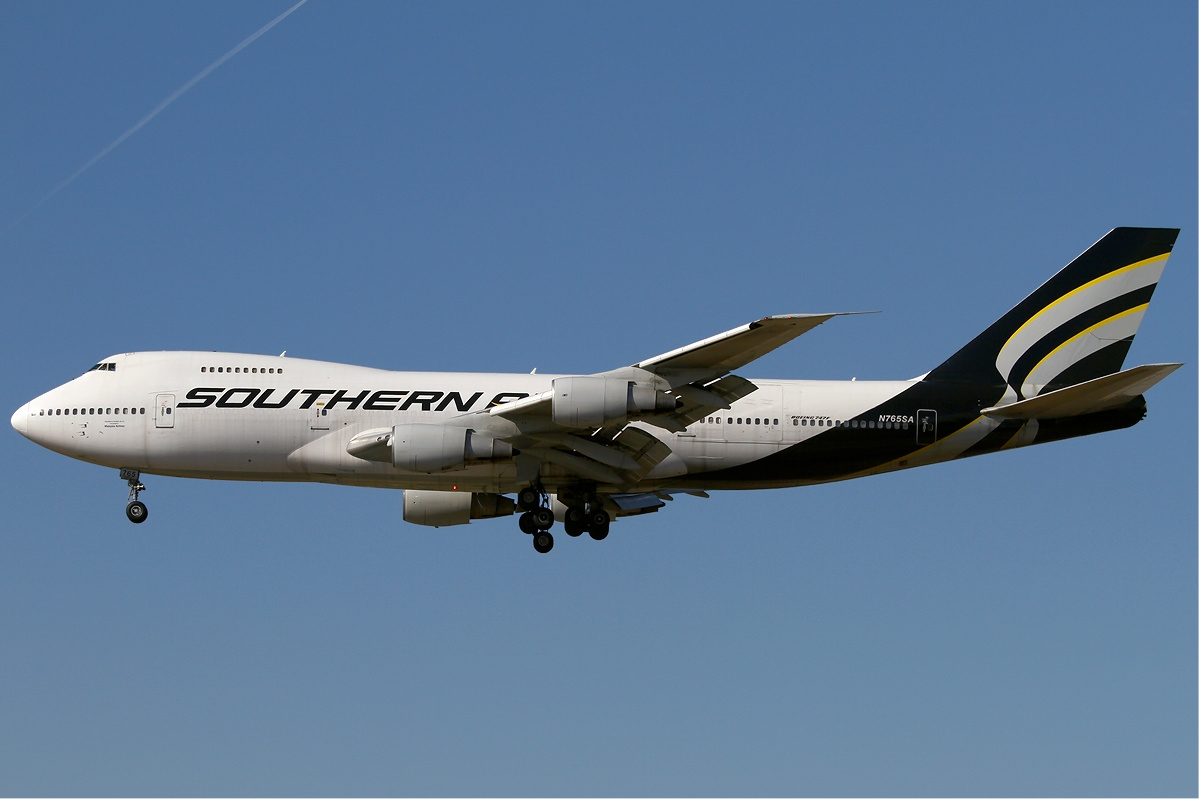
Southern Air Boeing 747-200

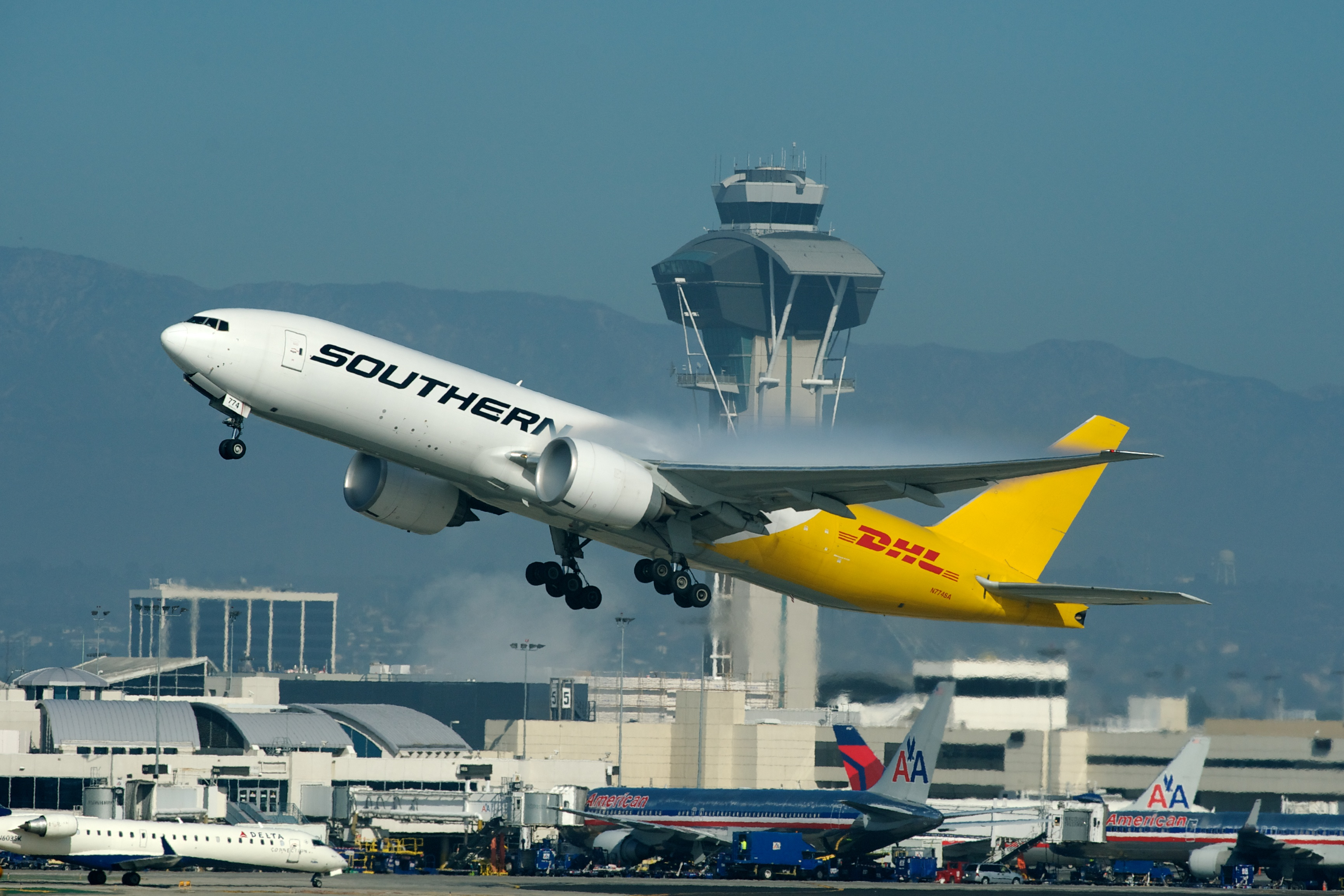
Southern Air Boeing 777F operated for DHL

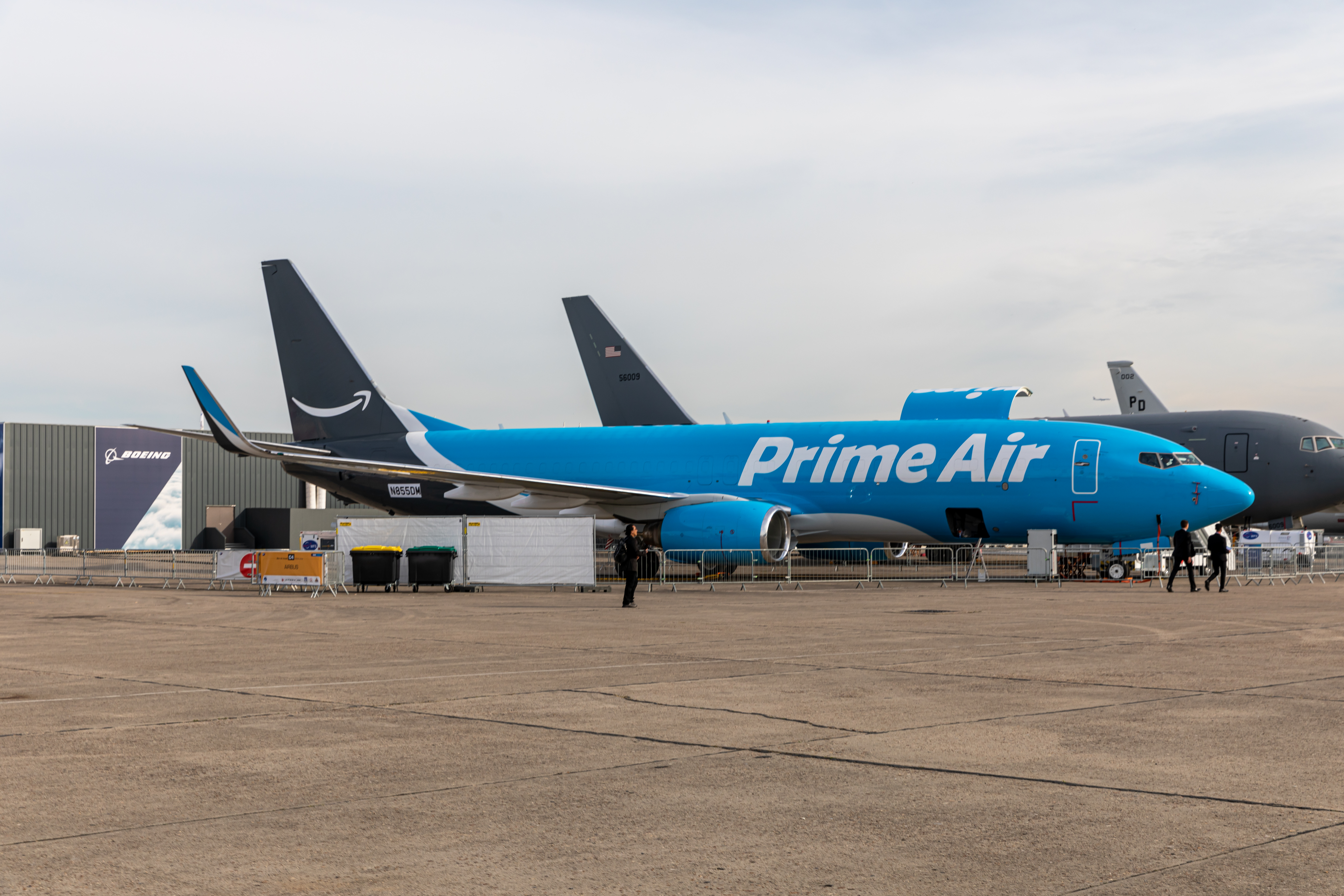
Southern Air Boeing 737-800BCF operated for Amazon Air

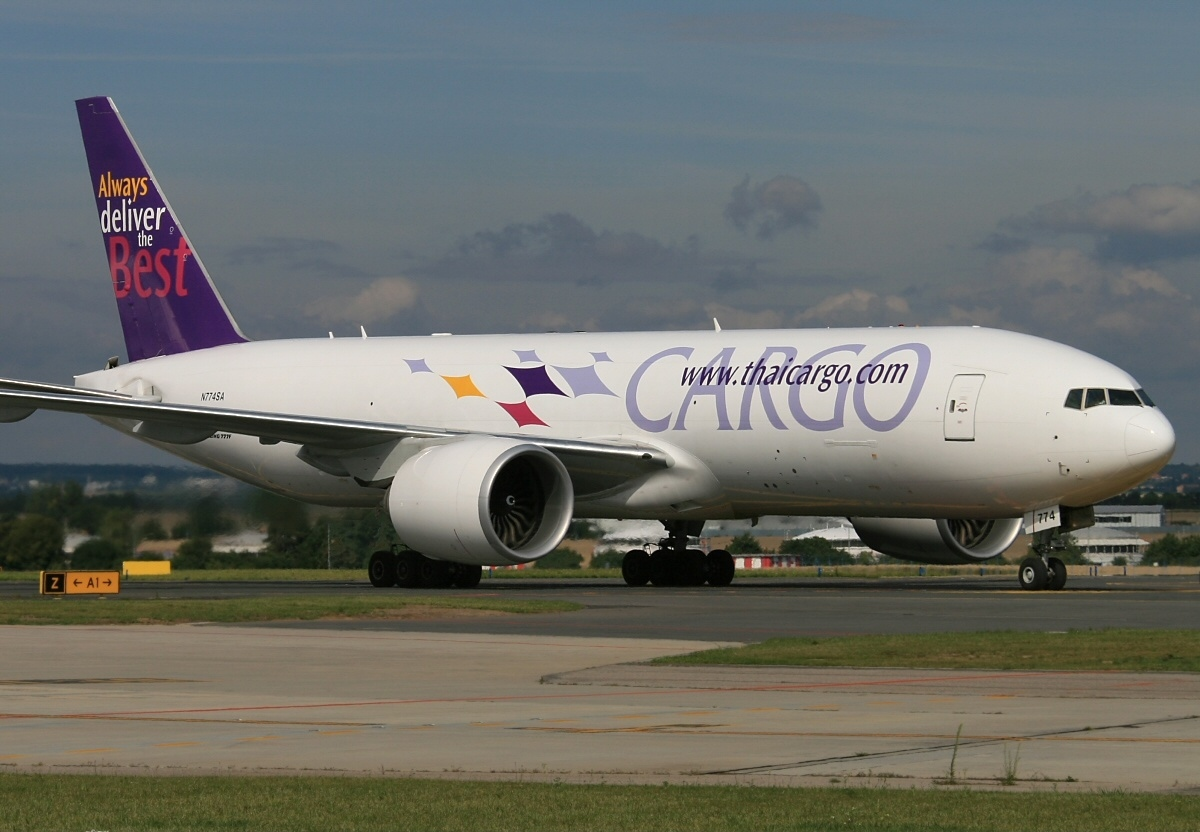
Southern Air Boeing 777F operated for Thai Cargo
