= Sky Lease Cargo =

American cargo airline

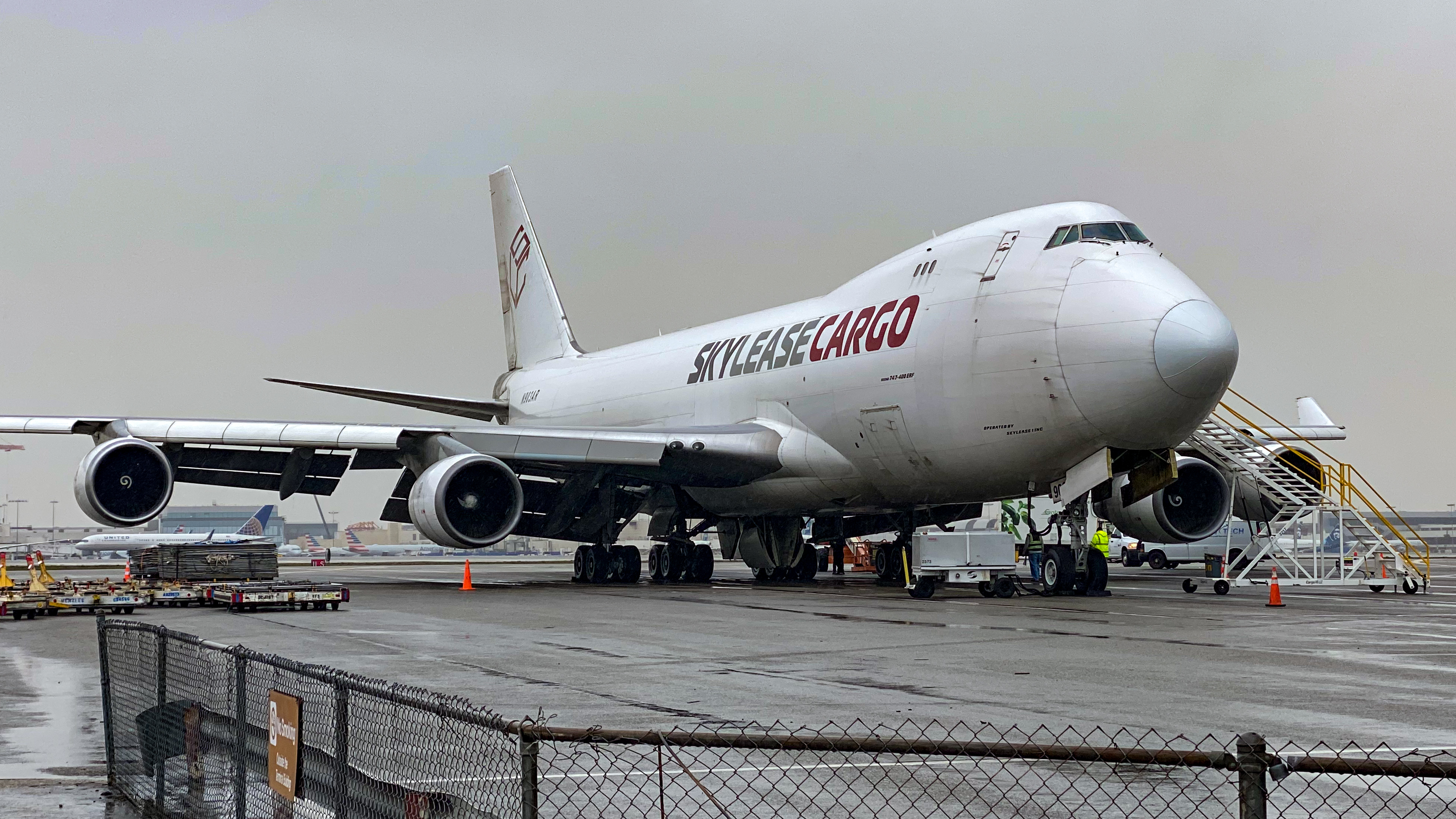
| IATA | ICAO | Call sign |
|---|---|---|
| GG | KYE | SKY CUBE |
- Founded: 1969; 57 years ago
- Commenced operations: 1973; 53 years ago
- AOC #: WRNA256M
- Fleet size: 2
- Destinations: 13
- Headquarters: Miami, Florida, United States
- Key people: Alfonso Rey (Chairman); Marcos Montesano (CEO); Wade Johnson (COO)
- Website: skyleasecargo.com

Sky Lease Cargo Inc. (legally Sky Lease I Inc) is an American cargo airline based in Miami, Florida, that provides transpacific and Latin American cargo services.

== History ==
The airline was established in 1969, as Wrangler Aviation and started operations in 1973, using Lockheed Constellation aircraft under FAA Part 91. It became a Part 121 carrier in 1978 and became an all-cargo airline in 1981.

Between 1991 and 1992, issues of citizenship, ownership, and compliance with federal airline laws resulted in the conclusion and finding that through the unregulated use of "Delaware Company Law" and the practice of subsidiaries being parts of other subsidiaries," Wrangler Aviation did not meet the fitness requirements of a certificated airline of the United States. The conclusions resulted in restructuring changes to the company to continue operating.

In 1991, the airline was renamed to Tradewinds Airlines. On February 28, 1994, Tradewinds was acquired by Florida West Airlines, although it was sold off a year later after filing for bankruptcy. In December 2007, Donald Watkins, a lawyer from Alabama, bought part of the company. On June 6, 2008, the airline reduced its staff by 70% and parked all their fleet.

During 2006, explorative attempts were made by Valiant Airways to contract Tradewinds Airlines for "start-up" operations, but these attempts failed to result in services coming to fruition.

Further press releases on June 3, 2008, indicate that Tradewinds returned five Boeing 747-200F aircraft to the lessor and furloughed employees who operated the lines. On July 25, 2008, Tradewinds Airlines filed for Chapter 11 bankruptcy protection for the third time. The company cited rising fuel costs and low demand, but plans to continue operating flights during the reorganization. In December 2008, Tradewinds Airlines was purchased by Sky Lease One, an affiliate of Centurion Air Cargo, based out of Florida.

Tradewinds Airlines was renamed Sky Lease Cargo on September 4, 2011, and also changed its IATA and ICAO codes.

On February 7, 2025, Sky Lease Cargo announced it would close down its facilities at Miami International Airport and had laid off 129 employees.

== Destinations ==
As of March 2020, Sky Lease Cargo operates the following services:

| Country | City | Airport | Notes | Refs |
|---|---|---|---|---|
| Argentina | Buenos Aires | Ministro Pistarini International Airport | | |
| Brazil | Campinas | Viracopos International Airport | | |
| Brazil | Manaus | Eduardo Gomes International Airport | | |
| Brazil | Rio de Janeiro | Rio de Janeiro/Galeão International Airport | | |
| Chile | Santiago | Arturo Merino Benítez International Airport | | |
| Colombia | Bogotá | El Dorado International Airport | | |
| Colombia | Medellín | José María Córdova International Airport | | |
| Ecuador | Quito | Mariscal Sucre International Airport | | |
| Netherlands | Amsterdam | Amsterdam Airport Schiphol | | |
| Paraguay | Ciudad del Este | Guaraní International Airport | | |
| Peru | Lima | Jorge Chávez International Airport | | |
| United States | Miami | Miami International Airport | Hub | |
| Uruguay | Montevideo | Carrasco International Airport | | |
| Venezuela | Caracas | Simón Bolívar International Airport | | |

== Fleet ==
=== Current ===
As of August 2025, Sky Lease Cargo operates the following aircraft:

| Aircraft | In service | Orders | Notes |
|---|---|---|---|
| Boeing 747-400ERF | 2 | — | |
| Total | 2 | — | |

== Photo gallery ==
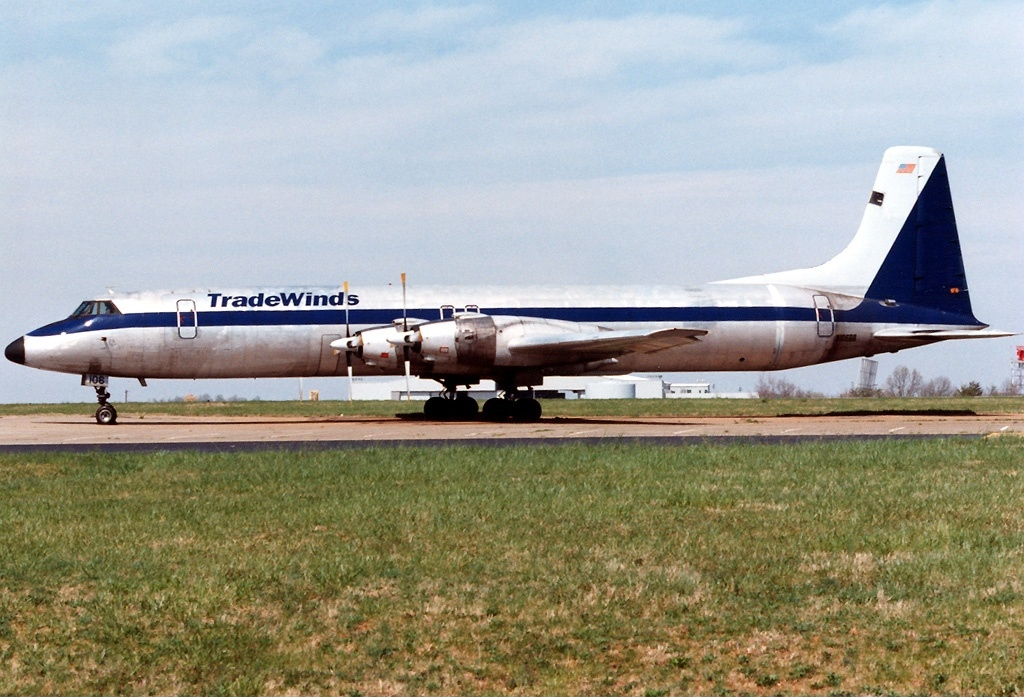
Canadair CL-44

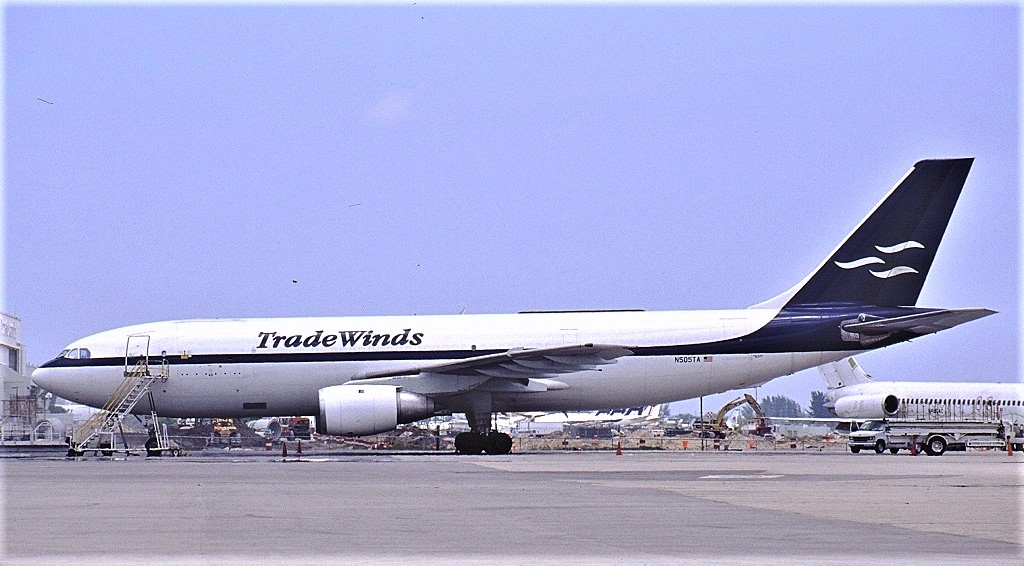
Airbus A300B4F

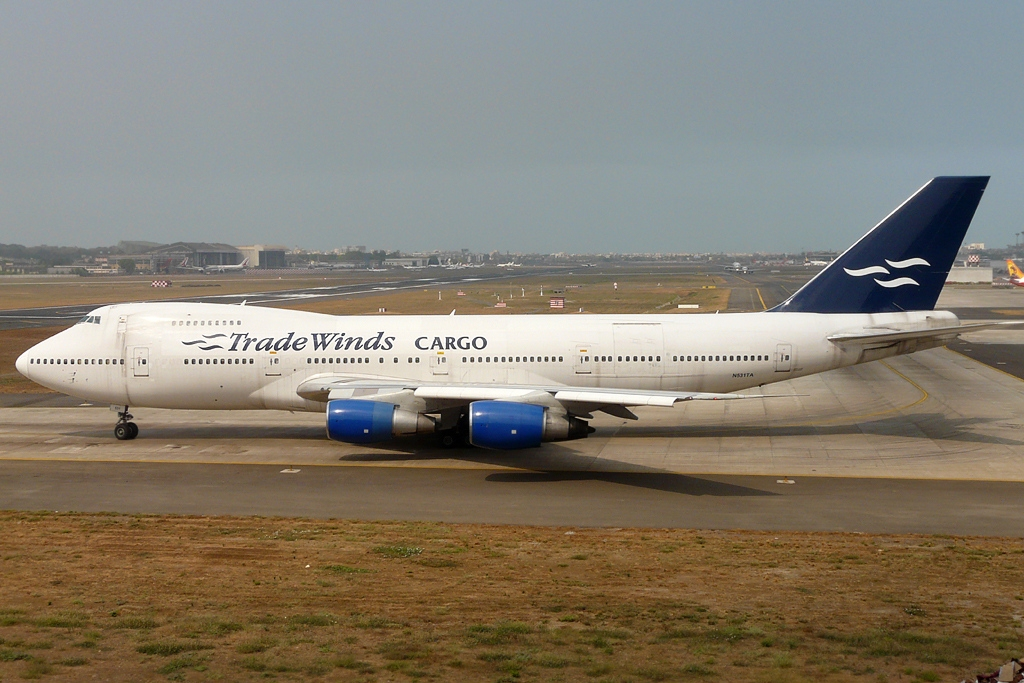
Boeing 747-230B(SF)

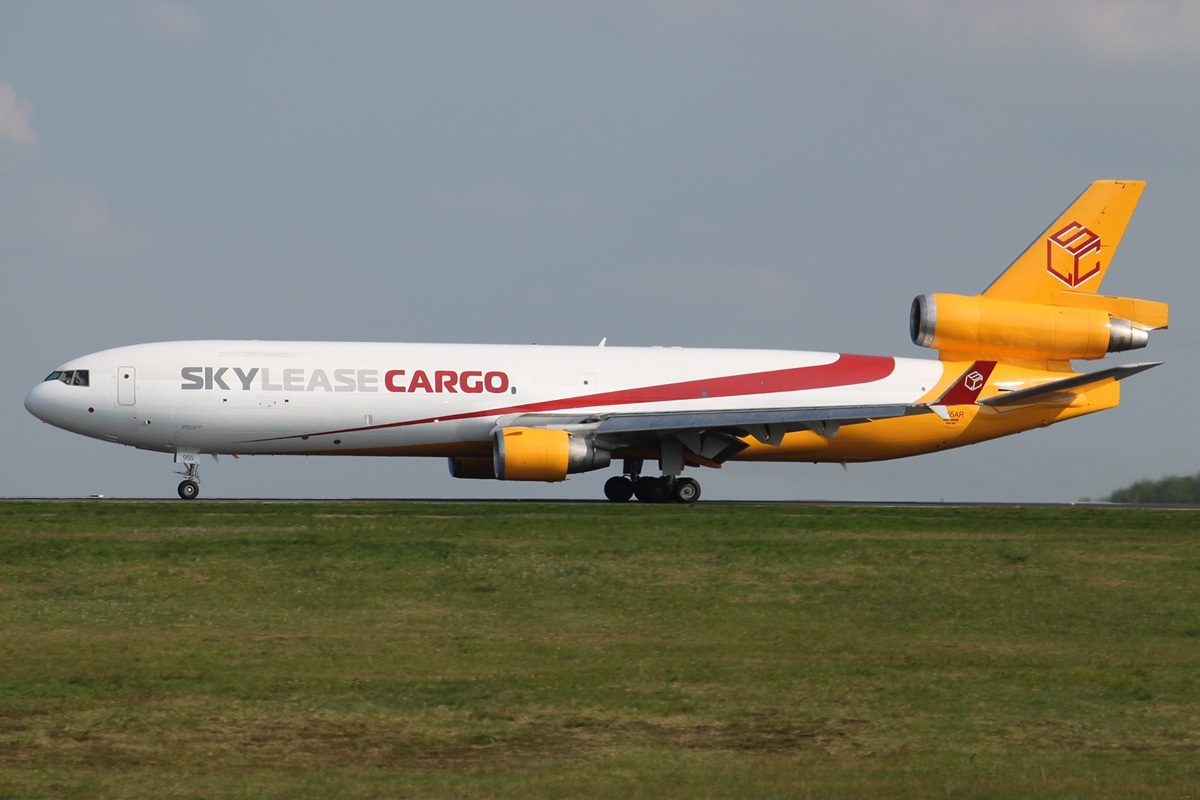
McDonnell Douglas MD-11F

== Accidents and incidents ==
- On June 7, 2006, a Boeing 747-200F by the (registered N922FT) had an engine failure on takeoff at José María Córdova International Airport. The take-off was aborted, but the plane overran the runway. None of the 6 on board were injured. However, the aircraft was written off.
- On November 7, 2018, Sky Lease Cargo Flight 4854 overran Runway 14 at Halifax Stanfield International Airport, Canada. The aircraft was written off.

== See also ==
- List of airlines of the United States
