= Sky Lease Cargo Flight 4854 =

2018 aviation accident in Canada

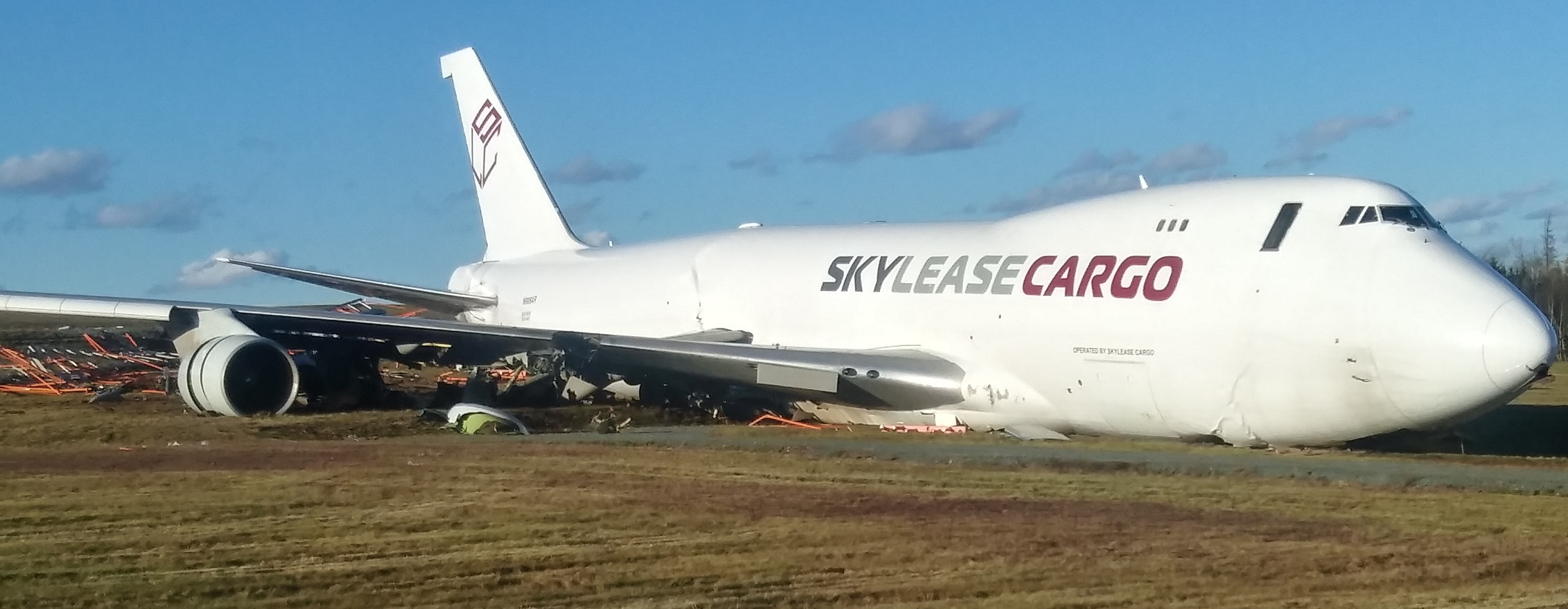
- The aircraft after overrunning the runway

Accident
- Date: November 7, 2018
- Summary: Runway overrun caused by pilot error compounded by pilot fatigue
- Site: Halifax Stanfield International Airport; 44°52′57″N 63°30′54″W

Aircraft
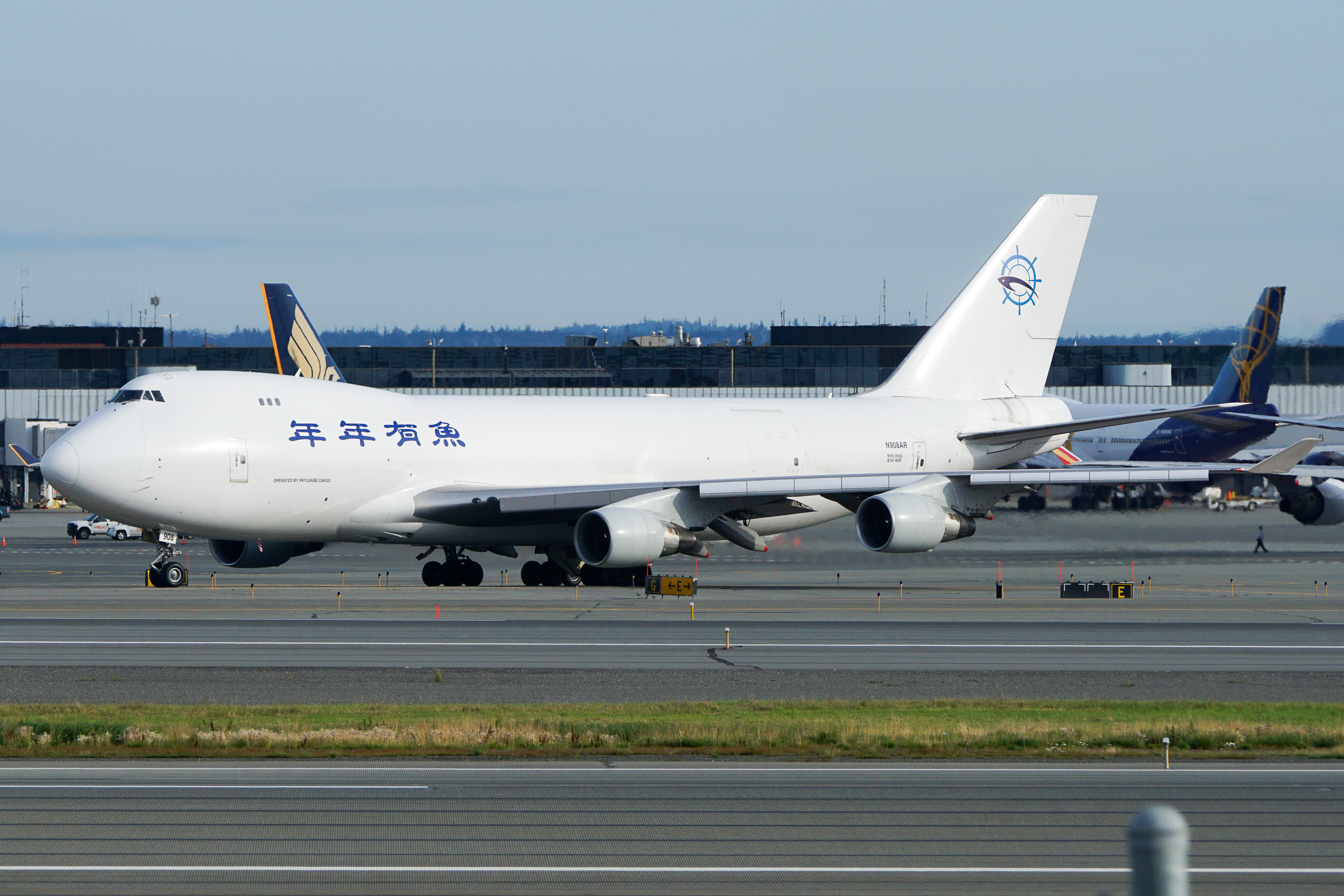
- N908AR, the aircraft involved in the accident, pictured in August 2018
- Aircraft type: Boeing 747-412F
- Operator: Sky Lease Cargo
- IATA flight No.: GG4854
- ICAO flight No.: KYE4854
- Call sign: SKY CUBE 4854
- Registration: N908AR
- Flight origin: Chicago O'Hare International Airport
- Stopover: Halifax Stanfield International Airport
- Last stopover: Ted Stevens Anchorage International Airport
- Destination: Changsha Huanghua International Airport
- Occupants: 4
- Passengers: 1
- Crew: 3
- Fatalities: 0
- Injuries: 3
- Survivors: 4

Sky Lease Cargo Flight 4854 was a flight served by a Boeing 747-400 that overran the runway on landing at Halifax Stanfield International Airport, Nova Scotia, Canada, on November 7, 2018. The cause of the accident was attributed to pilot error and fatigue. The accident injured three of the four crew members. The aircraft was written off and subsequently scrapped.

== Background ==
The aircraft involved was a Boeing 747-412F registered as N908AR with serial number 28026. It was delivered new to Singapore Airlines Cargo and registered as 9V-SFF, before Sky Lease Cargo acquired it in April of 2017. The aircraft did not have any cargo aboard. There was a crew of 3 and 1 passenger, an off-duty captain who was deadheading. Flight 4854's route took it from Chicago O'Hare Intl. Airport to Halifax Stanfield Intl. Airport, where it would onload cargo. It would continue to Ted Stevens Anchorage International Airport to refuel and change crews and depart for its final destination of Changsha Huanghua International Airport.

== Accident ==
The crew flew the instrument landing system (ILS) approach for runway 14. Eighty-one seconds from the runway threshold, the pilots noticed a tailwind. The crew continued the approach without recalculating the performance data to confirm that the stopping distance was sufficient, possibly because they had only a short time before landing. The tailwind they encountered increased the 747's stopping distance, but the distance still did not exceed the length of the runway.

The plane touched down at 5:06 am Atlantic Standard Time in darkness. After touching down, the throttle for engine 1 was advanced beyond the idle position. This caused the autobrakes to disengage and the spoilers to retract. The 4.5° right crab angle, the crosswinds faced on landing and asymmetric thrust caused the aircraft to drift right of the centerline. The pilot's attention was tightly focused on the lateral movement, rather than deceleration. Thus, vital callouts were never made. Although manual braking was applied 8 seconds after touchdown, maximum braking did not occur until 15 seconds later. The aircraft was just 800 feet (244 m) from the end of runway 14.

Five seconds later, Flight 4854 sped off the end of the asphalt at 77 knots (143 km/h; 89 mph) and slid down an embankment. The nose and body landing gears collapsed, and engines 2 and 3 were ripped from each wing. The aircraft finally came to rest, in a grassy area just short of a public road about 544 feet (166 m) past the end of runway 14. All three crew members were slightly injured. The passenger did not receive any injuries.

== Investigation ==
It was discovered that the crew had not received enough restorative rest in the 24 hours before the accident. This factor, combined with the timing of the flight, significantly degraded the pilots' decision making and overall performance. This added to the confusion and slowed reaction times of the crew to initiate a go-around or to catch each other's mistakes including disengaging the autobrakes. Another contributing factor was the pilots not choosing the easier approach for runway 23. This was a longer runway perpendicular to runway 14. At the time of the accident, the first 1,767 feet (539 m) of runway 23 was closed for light and marking work. The Notice to Airmen (NOTAM) the crew received stated "NOT AUTH" in reference to runway 23. This may have led the crew to believe the entire runway was closed. Accounting for the closed section, runway 23 was still longer than runway 14.

== Aftermath ==
The 747-412F involved (N908AR) was damaged beyond repair and written off. The crew were sent to hospital for their injuries. The uninjured passenger was also admitted for assessment as a precaution. No crew members faced criminal charges.

== See also ==
- American Airlines Flight 1420
- List of accidents and incidents involving the Boeing 747
- China Airlines Flight 605
- Lion Air Flight 538
- Qantas Flight 1
- Southwest Airlines Flight 1248
- Southwest Airlines Flight 1455
