= Cargo 360 =

- Founded: May 15, 2006; 18 years ago
- Ceased operations: January 2008; 17 years ago (merged into Southern Air)
- Hubs: Seattle–Tacoma International Airport
- Fleet size: 3
- Destinations: 5
- Headquarters: Seattle, Washington, United States
- Key people: H. David Greenberg, Brian Smith

Cargo 360 was a cargo airline based in Seattle, Washington, USA. It specialised in ACMI (Aircraft, Crew, Maintenance and Insurance) wet lease operations. Its main headquarters was at Seattle–Tacoma International Airport.

== History ==
The airline started operations on 15 May 2006. It was established by H. David Greenberg, and other entrepreneurs. The airline was owned by Oak Hill Capital Partners (86%) and David Greenberg, President and CEO (14%).

On July 30, 2007, Oak Hill Capital Partners acquired Southern Air and merged the two airlines into one, giving birth to Southern Air Holdings, Inc. Consequently, Cargo 360 was absorbed into Southern Air in January 2008 and ceased operating under its own colors.

The logo and aircraft livery was designed by Dave and Jackie Greenberg and Chad Hill while with Redorchestra Creative (now defunct) in Chicago, IL.

== Destinations ==
Cargo 360 had an ACMI contract with Korean Air Cargo between Incheon International Airport Incheon, South Korea and multiple destinations within the United States.

== Fleet ==
As of September 2007, the Cargo 360 fleet included:

- 1 Boeing 747-3B5M(SF) - N301JD
- 2 Boeing 747-2B5F/SCD - N298JD and N299JD

== See also ==
- List of defunct airlines of the United States
