= Polar Air Cargo =

American cargo airline

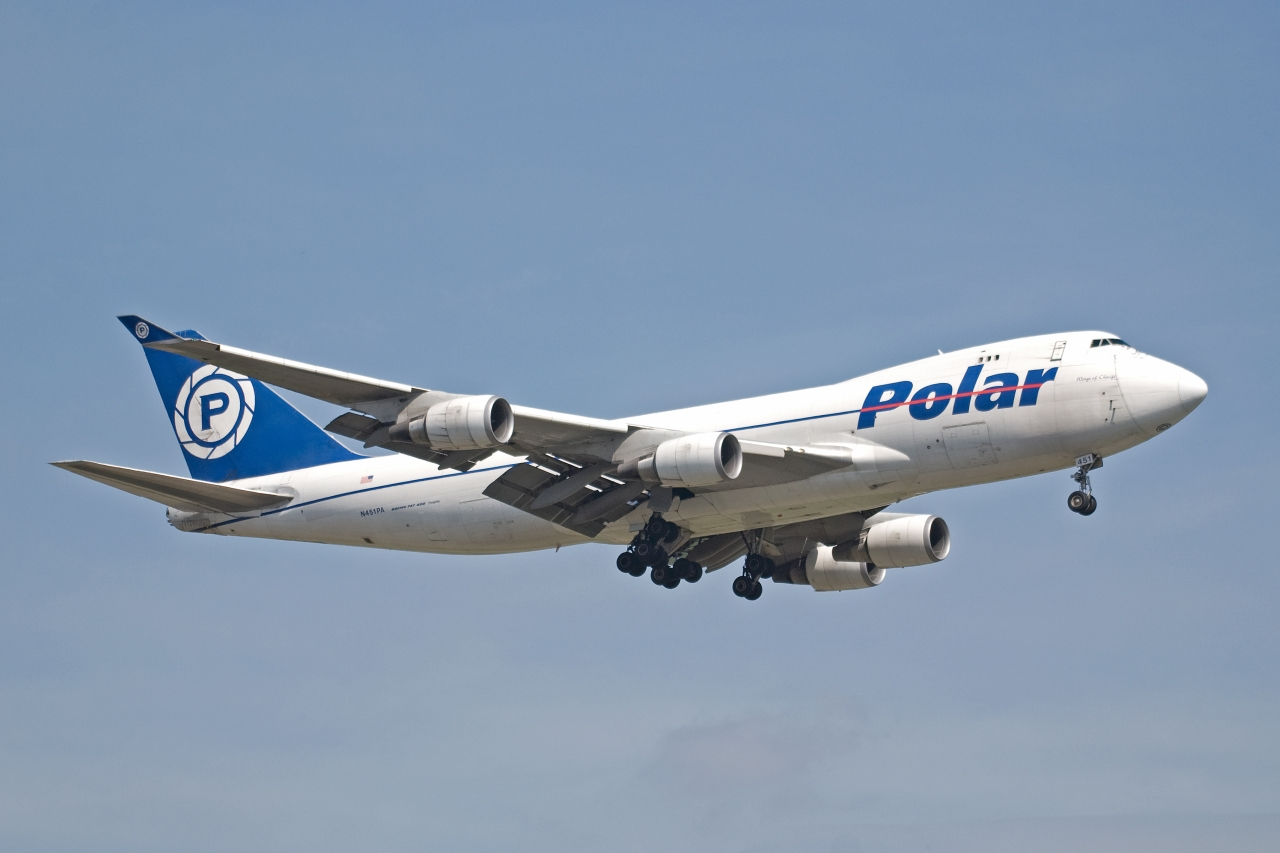
IATA	ICAO	Call sign
PO	PAC	POLAR
- Founded: 1993; 33 years ago
- AOC #: P5CA067Y
- Hubs: Anchorage; Cincinnati; Hong Kong; Los Angeles; Seoul–Incheon; Tokyo–Narita
- Focus cities: Chicago–O'Hare; Miami; Nagoya–Centrair; New York–JFK
- Fleet size: 4
- Destinations: Worldwide
- Parent company: Atlas Air Worldwide Holdings (100%)
- Headquarters: White Plains, New York, United States
- Key people: Michael Steen
- Employees: 210
- Website: polaraircargo.com

Polar Air Cargo Worldwide Inc. is a cargo airline based in Purchase, New York, United States. It operates scheduled all-cargo services to North America, Asia, and Europe. Its main base is Cincinnati/Northern Kentucky International Airport, with hubs at Los Angeles International Airport, Hong Kong International Airport, Narita International Airport and Incheon International Airport near Seoul, South Korea. The joint venture between Atlas Air and DHL to operate Polar concluded in 2025. Atlas Air Worldwide Holdings acquired the remaining equity interest in Polar Air Cargo, making it a wholly owned subsidiary of Atlas Air Worldwide.

== History ==
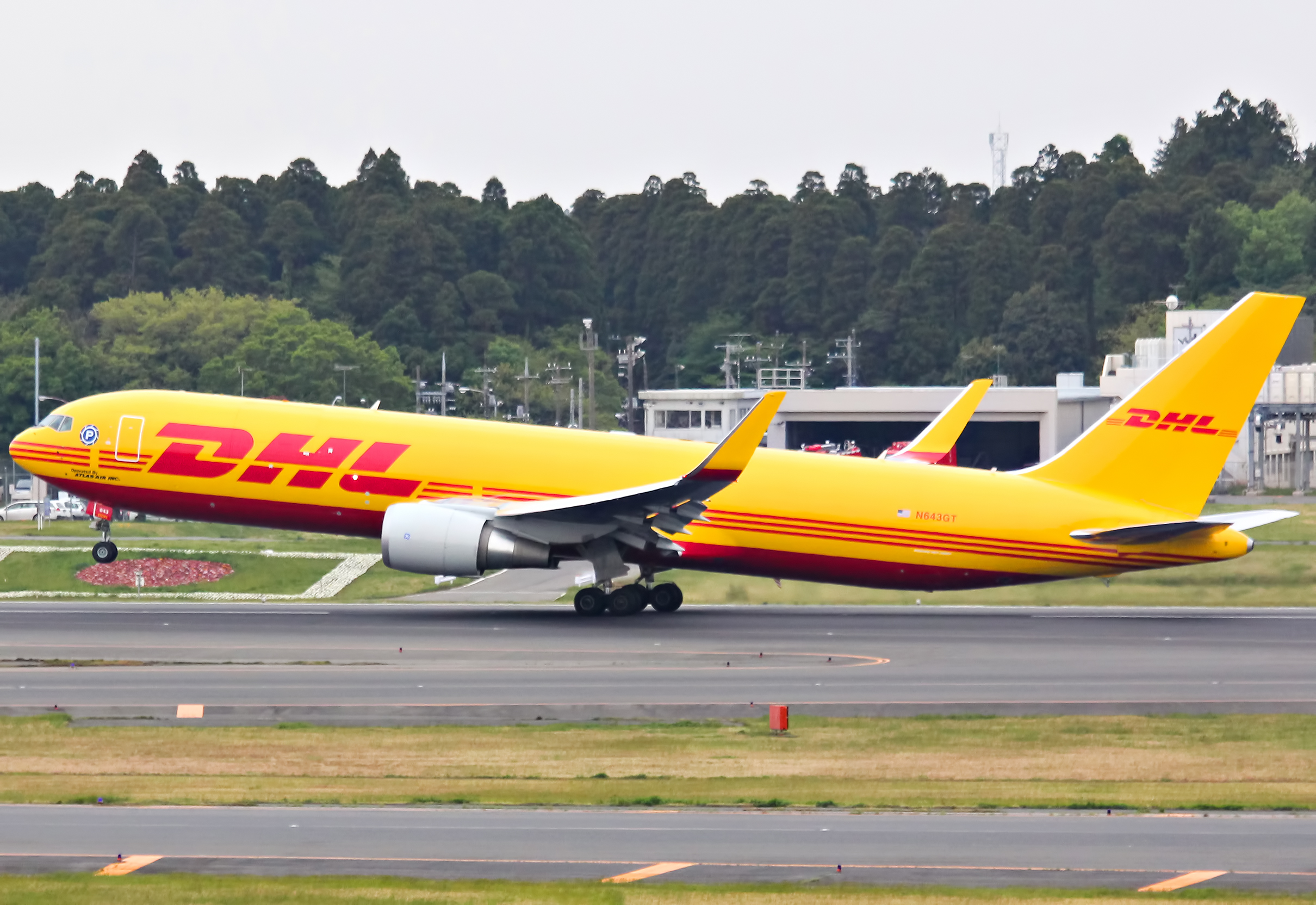
A Polar Air Cargo Boeing 767-300ERF in DHL Express colors (2013)

Polar was formed in 1993 as a joint venture between Southern Air Transport and GE Capital Aviation Services (GECAS). It started operations in June 1993 and began with charter flights, later adding scheduled services. During 1994, Polar was certified as a supplemental air carrier by the Federal Aviation Administration and on 4 July 1994 as a US all-cargo carrier by the United States Department of Transportation. After several years of continued growth, the remainder of the company was acquired by GECAS.

In November 2001, Polar was acquired by Atlas Air Worldwide Holdings (AAWW), whose Atlas Air subsidiary is a provider of ACMI (aircraft, crew, maintenance and insurance) freighter leasing. Polar became the scheduled service provider for AAWW, while Atlas continued to supply Boeing 747-400 freighters on a wet-lease basis to major airlines. On January 30, 2004, Atlas Air Worldwide entered Chapter 11 bankruptcy. In July 2004, the parent company completed its restructuring plan and emerged from Chapter 11 bankruptcy protection. In October 2006, it was announced that DHL Express would be acquiring a 49% stake in Polar. As of March 2007, Polar is still majority-owned by Atlas Air Worldwide Holdings (51%) and has 736 employees.

In April 2023, former Polar Air Cargo COO Lars Winkelbauer was arrested in Thailand and charged, along with 10 others, with defrauding the company of an estimated $52m.

In February 2025, Atlas Air and DHL announced that Polar Air Cargo would be dissolved, with the 4 747-8s and 2 777Fs in Polar’s fleet continuing to be operated by Atlas. Atlas Air will provide CMI (Crew, Maintenance, and Insurance) services on the 2 Boeing 777 freighters for DHL under separate, long-term vendor agreements.

== Destinations ==
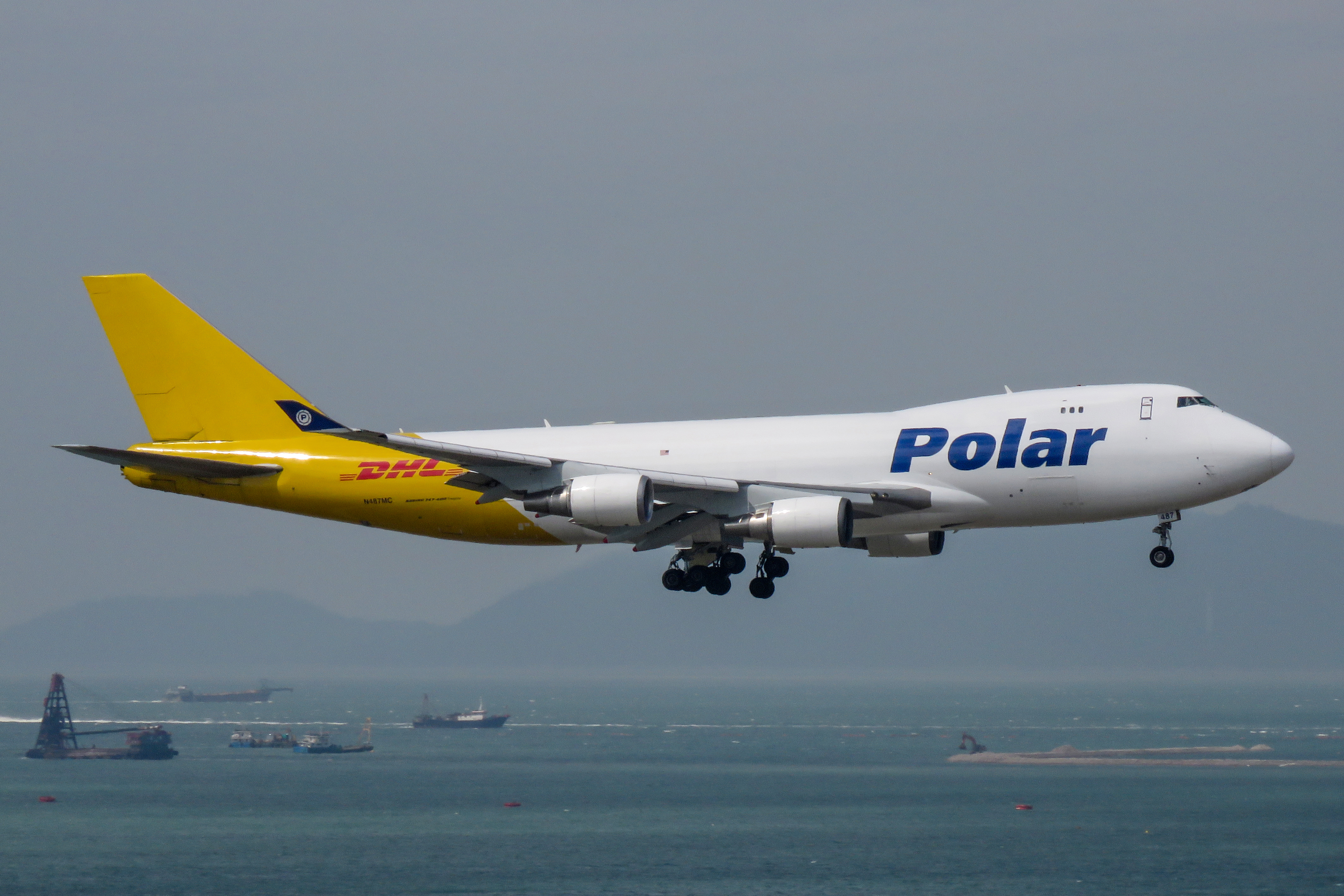
A Polar Air Cargo Boeing 747-400F in DHL colors arrives at Hong Kong International Airport (2018).

=== Scheduled services ===
Polar provides scheduled freight service covering the transpacific, transatlantic, trans-Asia, and Middle East markets. Polar offers frequent flights to China, connecting Shanghai to the United States and multiple points in Asia and Europe, e.g., Leipzig/Halle Airport in Germany and East Midlands Airport in the United Kingdom.

=== Charter services ===
Polar Air Cargo also offers its customers charter freight services, using its fleet of Boeing 747 and 767. Polar and its sister company, Atlas Air, also do extensive work for the U.S. Air Force’s Air Mobility Command (AMC).

== Fleet ==
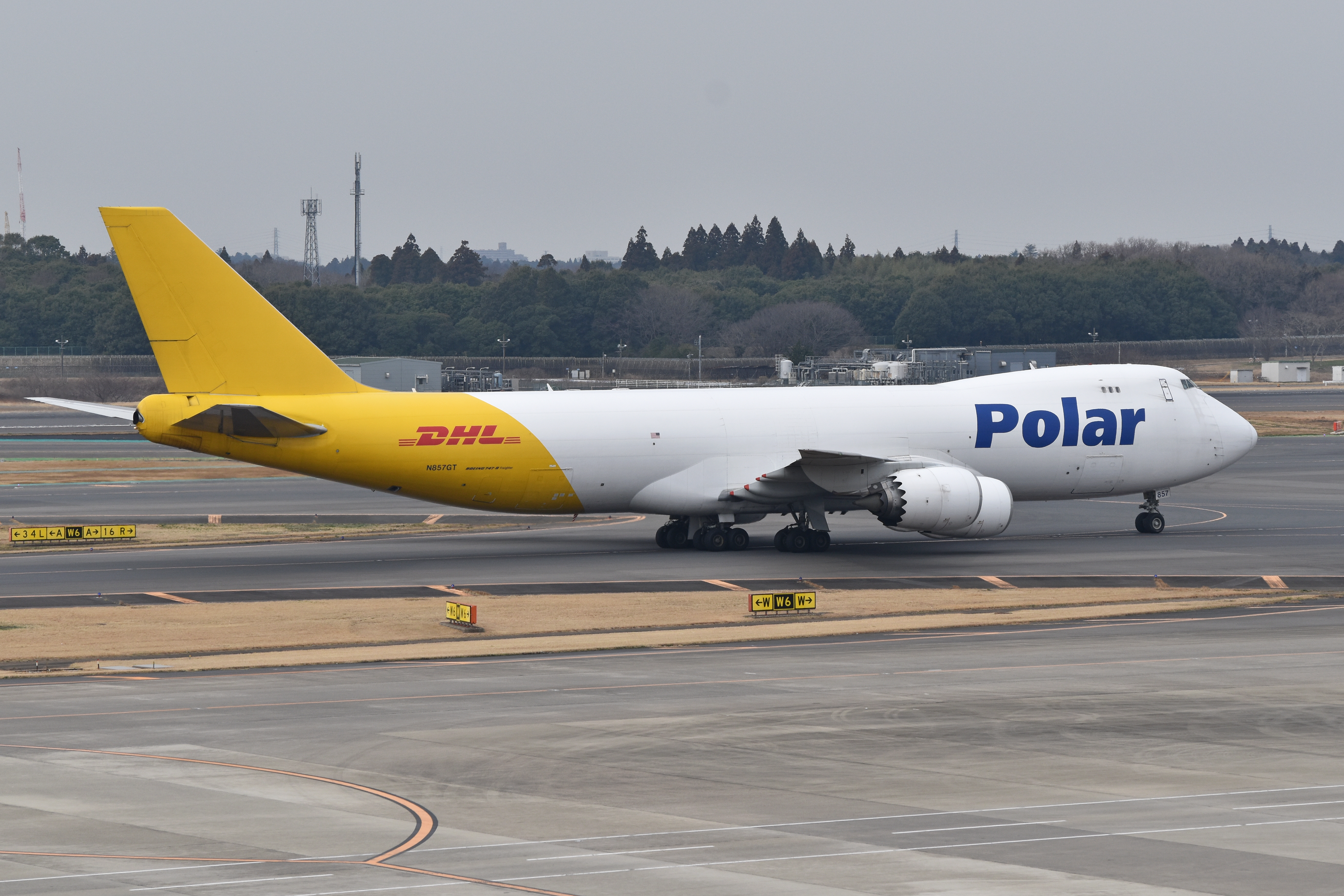
A Polar Air Cargo Boeing 747-8F

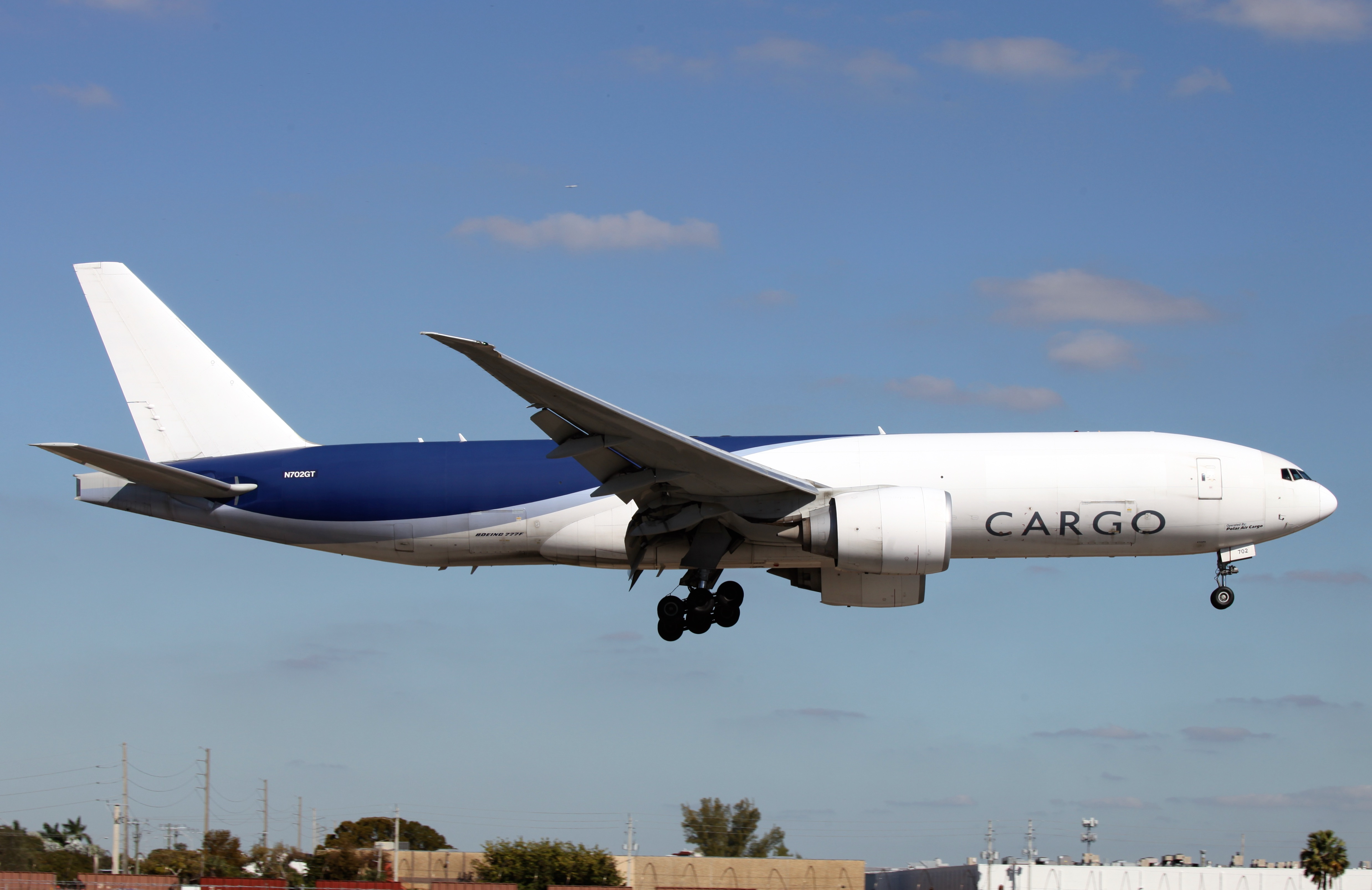
A Polar Air Cargo Boeing 777F

=== Current fleet ===
As of August 2025, Polar Air Cargo operates the following aircraft:

Polar Air Cargo fleet
Aircraft	In fleet	Orders	Notes
Boeing 747-8F	2	—	operating for Atlas Air
Boeing 777F	2	—	operating for DHL Aviation
Total	4	—	

=== Former fleet ===
Polar Air Cargo formerly operated the following aircraft:

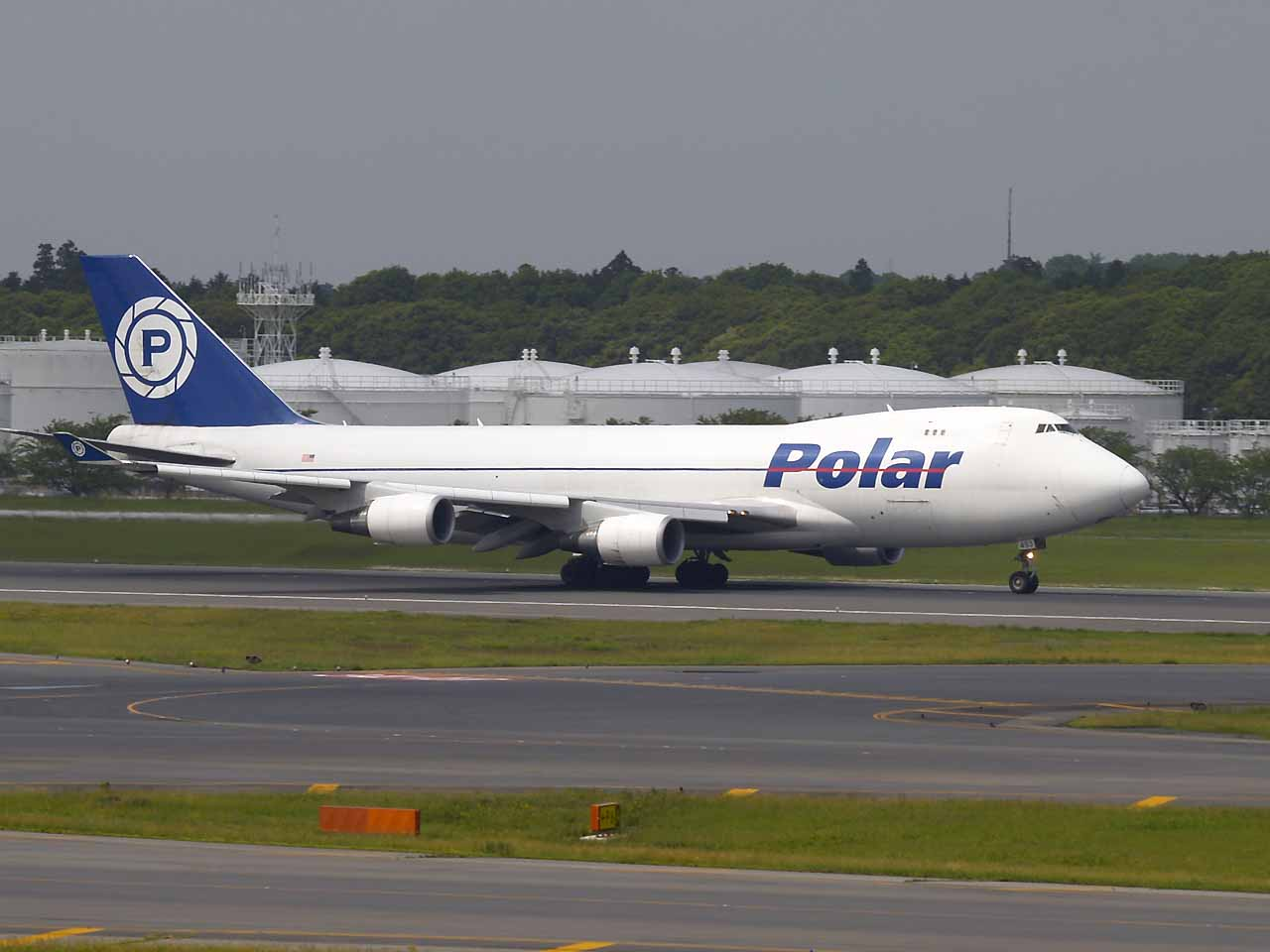
A Polar Air Cargo Boeing 747-400F at Narita International Airport (2008)

Polar Air Cargo former fleet
Aircraft	Total	Introduced	Retired	Notes
Boeing 747-100SF	14	1994	2006	
Boeing 747-200F	4	1996	2006	
Boeing 747-200SF	8	1999	2007	
Boeing 747-300SF	2	2002	2004	Leased from Atlas Air
Boeing 747-400F	6	2000	2022	Leased in, airframes were redelivered to DHL Aviation
Boeing 747-400F	3	2000	2022	Operated for Atlas Air
Boeing 747-8F	2			
Boeing 767-300ERF	4	2014	2024	Final aircraft left service February 2024

== Sources ==
- https://www.bloomberg.com/news/2011-01-20/atlas-air-worldwide-boosts-dhl-freighter-service.html
