= Atlas Air Worldwide Holdings =

American freight and charter airline

Atlas Air Worldwide Holdings, Inc.
- Type: Private
- Founded: 1992; 34 years ago
- Headquarters: Purchase, New York, United States
- Key people: Michael Steen (CEO); Richard Rolland (COO); Artem Gonopolskiy (CFO)
- Revenue: ▲US$4.03 billion (2021)
- Operating income: ▲US$7.11 billion (2021)
- Net income: ▲US$493.3 million (2021)
- Total assets: ▲US$6.44 billion (2021)
- Total equity: ▲US$2.81 billion (2021)
- Owner: Apollo Global Management
- Number of employees: 4,056 (2021)
- Subsidiaries: Air Atlanta Icelandic (49%); Atlas Air; Polar Air Cargo; Titan Aircraft Investments
- Website: atlasairworldwide.com

Atlas Air Worldwide Holdings, Inc. is an airline holding company based in Purchase, New York. The group owns Atlas Air, Polar Air Cargo, and has a freighter aircraft leasing joint venture with Bain Capital: Titan Aircraft Investments. The company was named after Atlas, a figure in Greek mythology, who carries the sky on his shoulders.

The company was listed on Nasdaq until 2023 when it was taken private by a group of investors led by Apollo Global Management.

== Operations ==
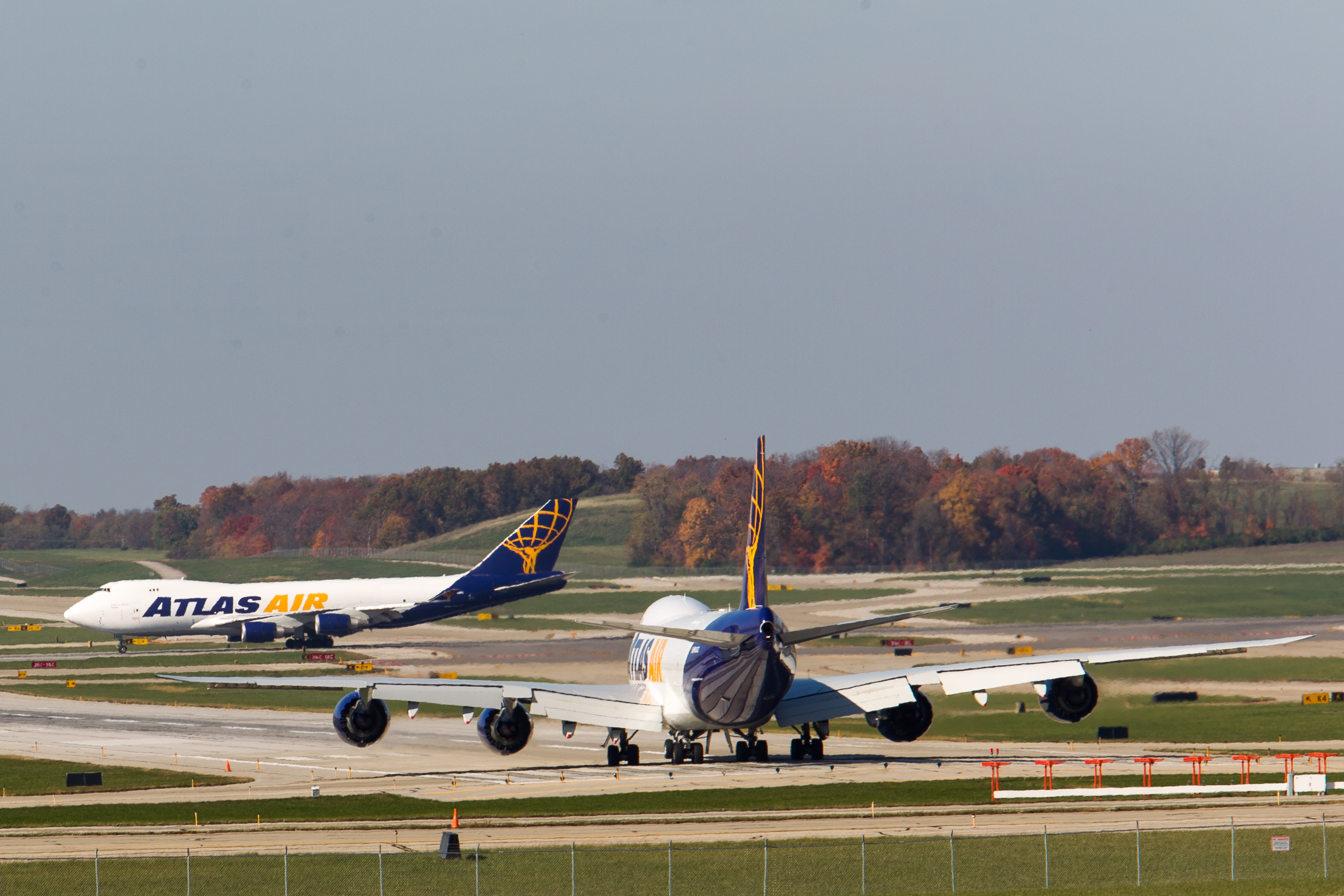
An Atlas Air Boeing 747-8F lines up on Runway 27 at Cincinnati/Northern Kentucky International Airport as one of the airline's 747-400Fs lands on Runway 18C.

Atlas Air Worldwide Holdings owns Atlas Air, Polar Air Cargo, and Titan Aircraft Investments. It is headquartered in Purchase, New York.

Atlas Air operates flights on an ACMI (Aircraft, Crew, Maintenance and Insurance), CMI and air charter basis for airlines, express operators, freight forwarders, charter brokers, global shippers and the U.S. Military, along with dry-leasing freighter aircraft. Atlas Air has global operations established in Africa, Asia, the Pacific, Europe, the Middle East, North America, and South America.

Titan Aircraft Investments is an aircraft dry-leasing company. Titan owns 29 aircraft in its dry-leasing fleet. The dry-leasing fleet consists of seven Boeing 777 freighters, twenty-one Boeing 767 freighters (leased to parent Atlas Air), and one Boeing 737-300 freighter.

In May 2026, AAWH agreed terms to purchase a 49% shareholding in Air Atlanta Icelandic.

== Fleet ==
As of December 2021, Atlas Air operates the following aircraft:

Atlas Air Worldwide Holdings fleet
Aircraft	In Service	Orders	Passengers					Notes
Aircraft	In Service	Orders	F	C	Y+	Y	Total	Notes
Passenger Fleet
Boeing 747-400	5	—	10	143	—	36	189	Used for VIP Service
Boeing 747-400	5	—	12	52	70	240	374	Used for VIP Service
Boeing 747-400	5	—	—	23	—	505	528	
Boeing 767-300ER	5	—	—	30	—	218	248	
Cargo Fleet
Boeing 737-300F	1	—	Cargo					Leased out by Titan Aircraft Investments.
Boeing 737-800F	8	—	Cargo					Owned and operated for Amazon Air.
Boeing 747-400F	30	—	Cargo					
Boeing 747-400F	5	—	Cargo					Owned and operated for Nippon Cargo Airlines.
Boeing 747-400LCF	4	—	Cargo					Owned and operated for Boeing.
Boeing 747-8F	9	3	Cargo					Including the last production Boeing 747-8, under registration N863GT, delivered on Feb. 1, 2023 under flight Atlas Air flight Giant 747 (5Y747/GTI747)
Boeing 747-8F	2	—	Cargo					Operating for Qantas Freight.
Boeing 767-300F	3	—	Cargo					
Boeing 767-300F	21	—	Cargo					Owned and operated for Titan Aircraft Investments.
Boeing 767-300F	2	—	Cargo					Owned and operated for DHL Aviation.
Boeing 777F	1	4	Cargo					
Boeing 777F	7	—	Cargo					Owned and operated for Titan Aircraft Investments.
Boeing 777F	6	—	Cargo					Owned and operated for DHL Aviation.
Total	109	7						
