= Atlas Air =

American freight and charter airline

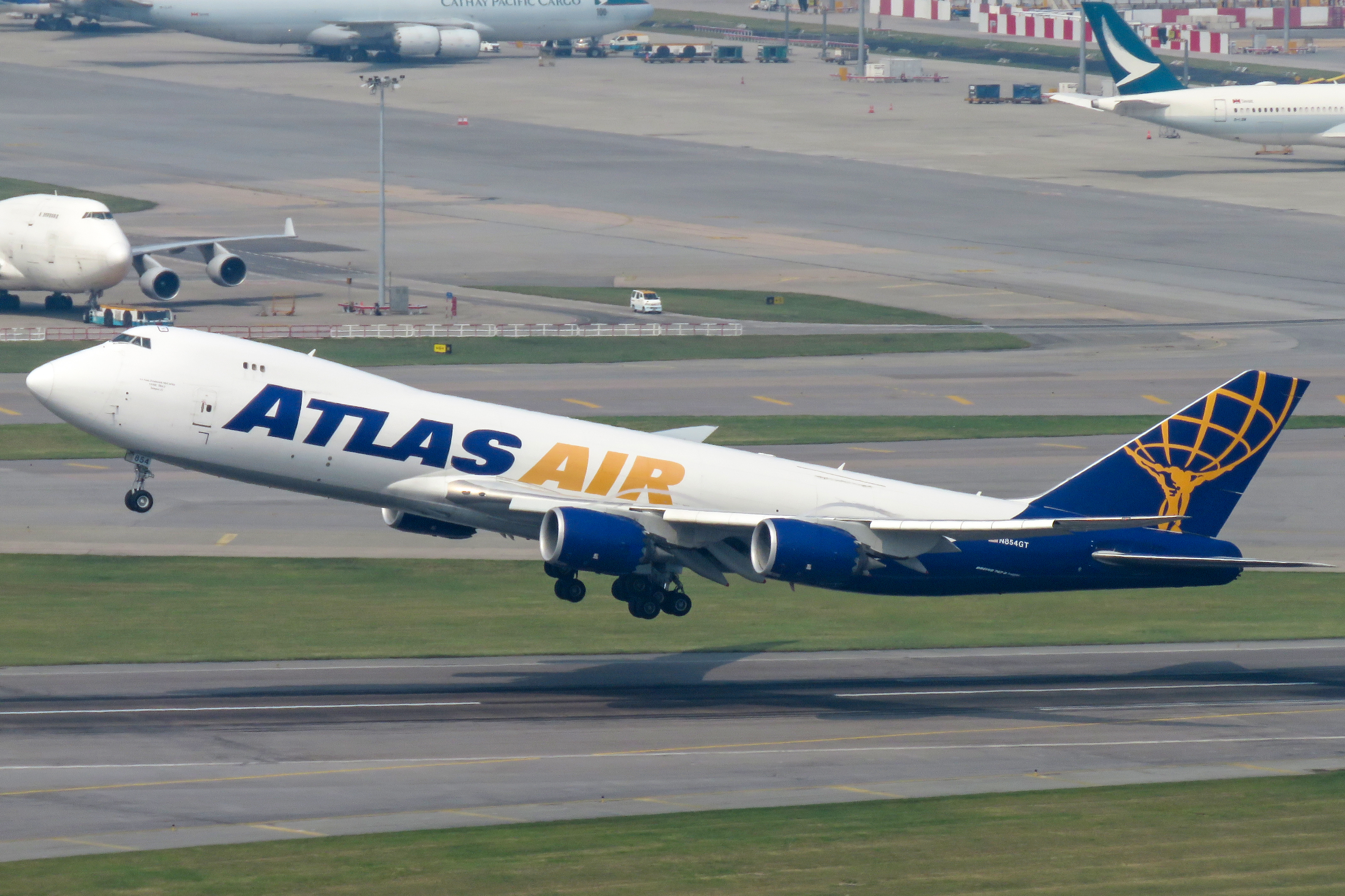
- An Atlas Air 747-87UF
IATA	ICAO	Call sign
5Y	GTI	GIANT
- Founded: 1992; 34 years ago
- AOC #: UIEA784U
- Hubs: Anchorage; Chicago–O'Hare; Cincinnati; Los Angeles; Miami; New York–JFK
- Fleet size: 113
- Parent company: Atlas Air Worldwide Holdings
- Headquarters: White Plains, New York, U.S.
- Key people: Michael T. Steen (president & CEO); David N. Siegel, (chairman)
- Website: www.atlasair.com

Atlas Air, Inc. is a major American cargo airline, passenger charter airline, and aircraft lessor based in White Plains, New York. It is a wholly owned subsidiary of Atlas Air Worldwide Holdings. Atlas Air is the world's largest operator of the Boeing 747, with 61 of the type. In 2025, the airline has about 5,000 employees and operated to more than 300 global destinations in 70 countries.

== History ==
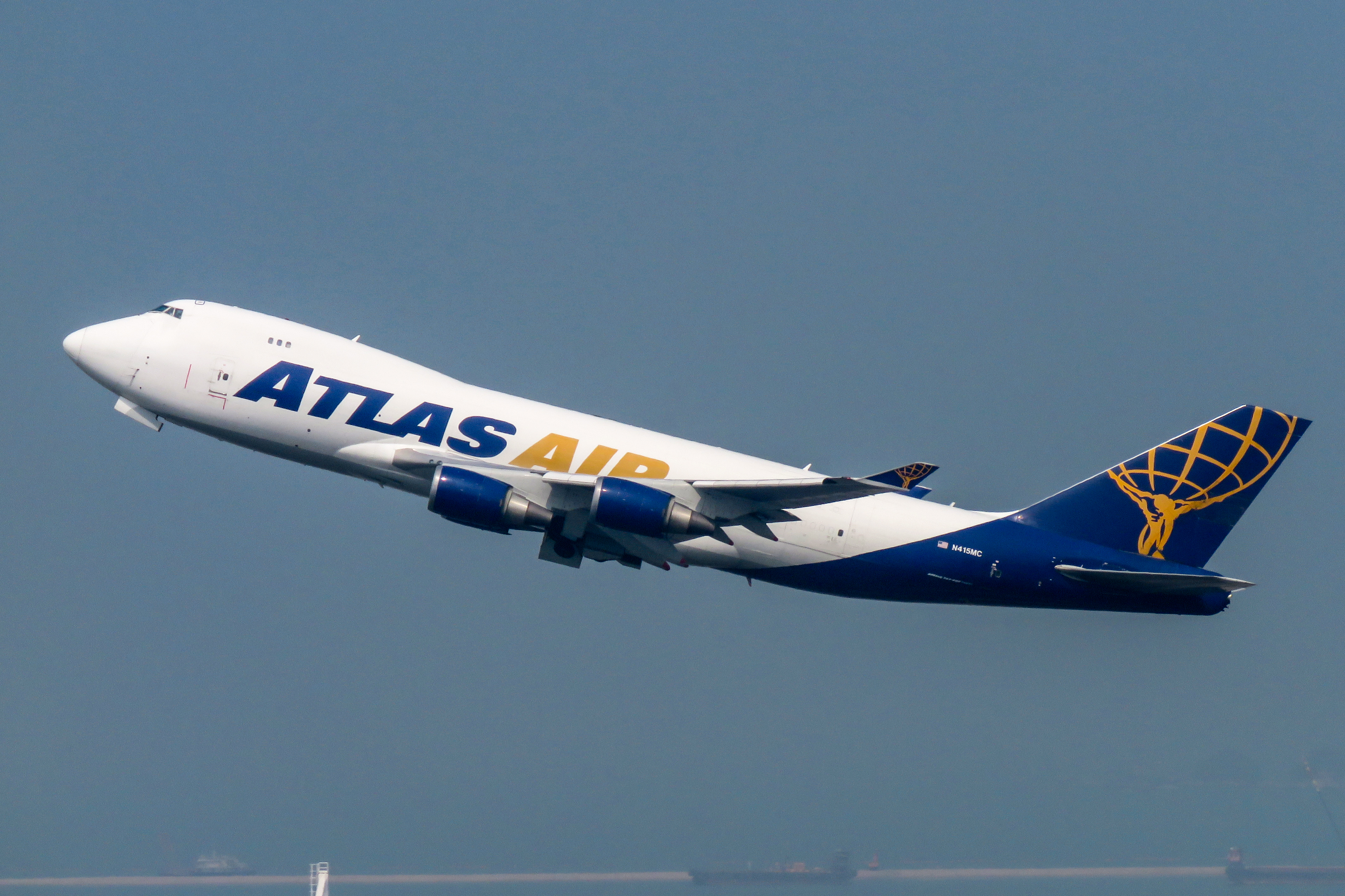
Atlas Air Boeing 747-400F

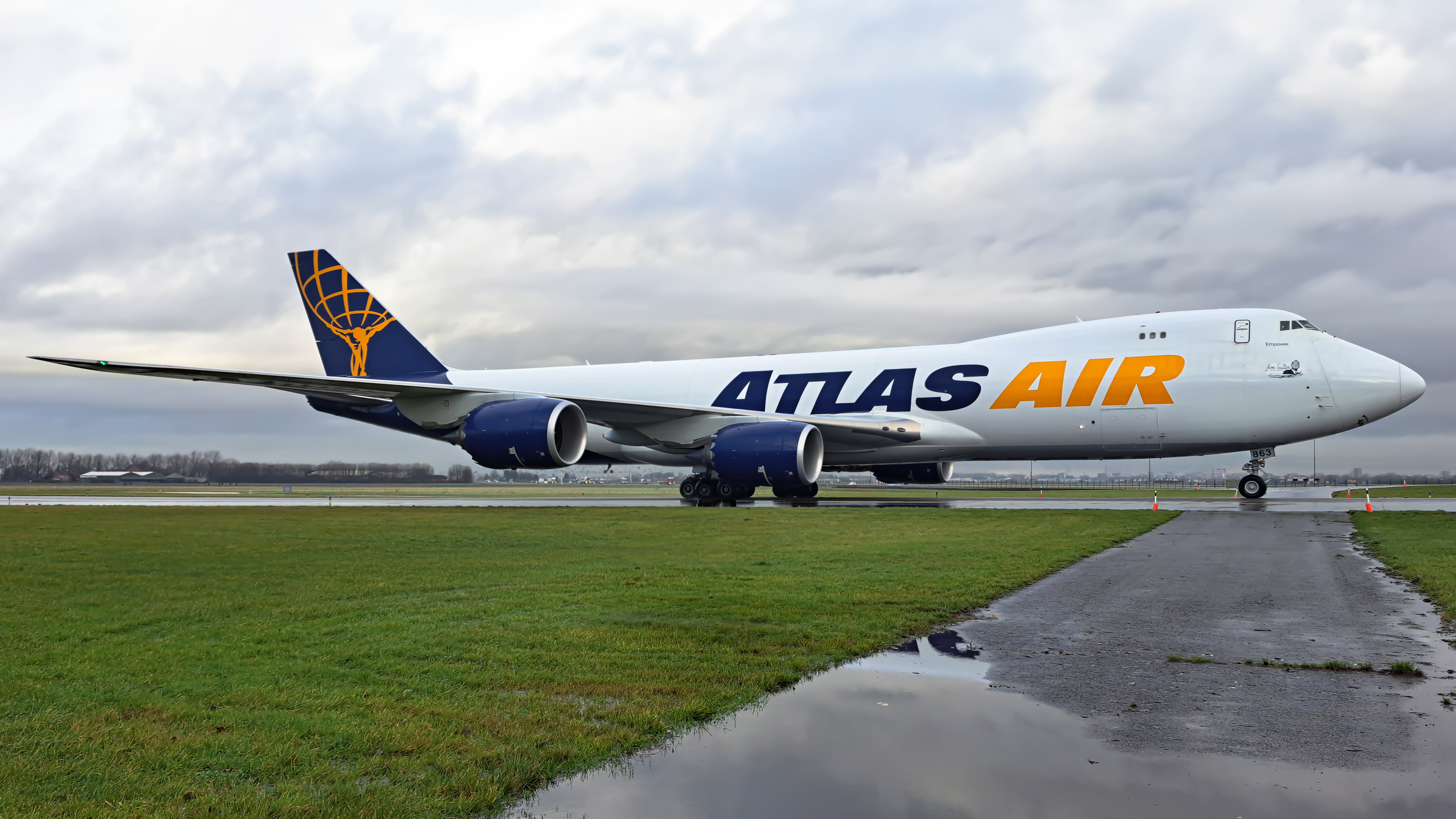
Boeing 747-8F N863GT, the last 747 ever built, on the taxiway at Schiphol Airport

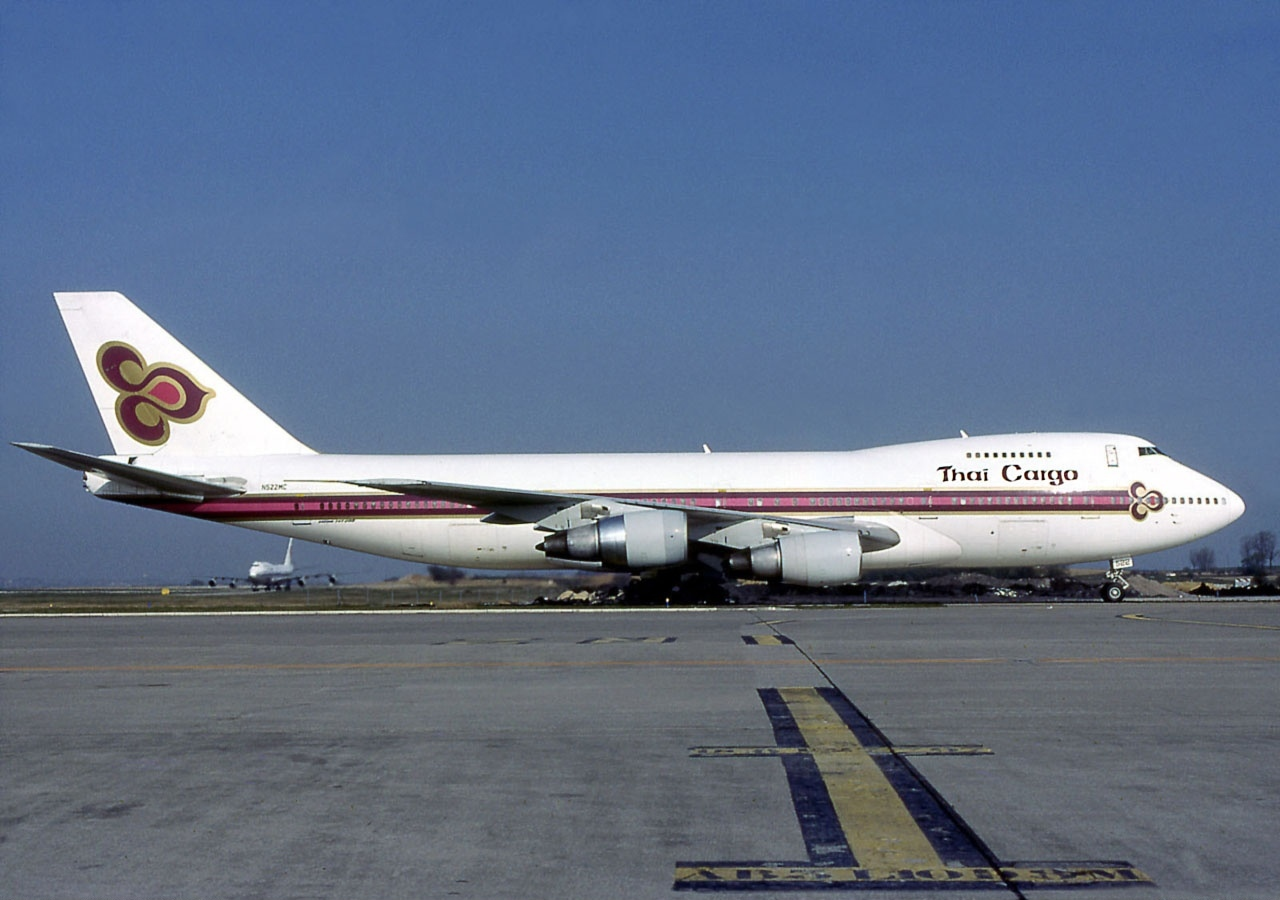
Boeing 747-2D7B(SF) (N522MC) Thai Airways International (Atlas Air)

In 1992, Atlas Air began operations when the airline's founder, Michael Chowdry, started leasing aircraft to airlines.

In 1993, China Airlines, the first customer, initiated operations with Atlas Air with one airplane on an aircraft, crew, maintenance, and insurance (ACMI) agreement. By 1995, Atlas Air began trading publicly. In 1997, Atlas placed an order for 10 Boeing 747-400F aircraft with another two orders for 747-400Fs placed in 1998.

In 2001, Atlas Air was restructured, becoming a subsidiary of Atlas Air Worldwide Holdings.

On January 30, 2004, Atlas Air Worldwide entered Chapter 11 bankruptcy. In July 2004, the parent company completed its restructuring plan and emerged from Chapter 11 bankruptcy protection.

In 2006, Amnesty International released a report on extraordinary rendition, stating that Atlas Air was one of the airlines used by the US government for rendering detainees. This was the basis for the song "Atlas Air" recorded by Massive Attack for the album Heligoland. In 2007, Atlas Air began a multiyear training contract with the United States Air Force to provide training for the pilots of Air Force One. The contract also provided training for the Presidential Airlift Group. This program has been renewed several times and remains in place as of 2022.

In March 2010, Atlas Air was awarded the contract to operate the Boeing Dreamlifter (officially the Boeing 747 Large Cargo Freighter), transporting aircraft parts to Boeing from suppliers around the world. It commenced operation in September 2010 under a CMI contract. In 2011, Atlas Air took the first North American delivery of the Boeing 747-8F freighter.

On April 7, 2016, Atlas Air Worldwide Holdings purchased Southern Air for US$110 million in an all-cash deal. The transaction included Worldwide Air Logistics Group, Inc. and its two operating subsidiaries, Southern Air, Inc. and Florida West International Airways, Inc. On May 5, 2016, Amazon.com and Atlas Air announced a deal for Amazon.com to lease 20 Boeing 767s to fuel growth of its new Amazon air-freight service, branded as Amazon Air. The deal also warranted Amazon the ability to buy up to 30% stake in the company over the next seven years. Under the agreement, Atlas Air Inc. would provide aircraft and CMI for seven years. This move came after Amazon's similar deal with Air Transport Services Group for 20 aircraft, also to be branded under Amazon Air. In March 2017, Atlas Air Worldwide Holdings shut down Florida West International Airways and cancelled the operating certificate.

In January 2021, Atlas Air announced the purchase of an additional four 747-8 freighters from Boeing. They were the final four 747s to be built. These were to be delivered in 2022, when Boeing planned to shut the 747 production program. On November 17, 2021, Atlas Air and Southern Air completed their merger with the transition to a single operating certificate. On August 4, 2022, Atlas agreed to be bought by an investor group for $3.2 billion.

On January 31, 2023, the airline received the 1,574th and final 747 ever made – a 747-8F registered N863GT. As the last 747 to be made by Boeing, the aircraft features a decal of Joe Sutter, the designer of the 747, on the front, right side and the words "forever incredible". Many Boeing employees and executives, including those who were part of the "Incredibles," the people who worked on the first 747 prototype, gathered at Boeing's Everett Plant to bid farewell to the final aircraft.

In 2024, the company relocated Atlas Air's headquarters from Purchase to White Plains, New York.

== Operations ==
Atlas Air's headquarters are in White Plains, New York with a flight operations center located in Erlanger, Kentucky. Atlas Air operates flights on an aircraft & CMI and air charter basis for airlines, express operators, freight forwarders, charter brokers, global shippers, and the U.S. military, along with dry-leasing freighter aircraft. Atlas Air has global operations established in Africa, Asia, the Pacific, Europe, the Middle East, North America, and South America. Crew bases are located at Anchorage–Ted Stevens; Chicago–O'Hare; Cincinnati; Los Angeles; Memphis; Miami; New York–JFK; Ontario, California; and Tampa.

As of late 2023, Atlas Air operates MSC Air Cargo flights on behalf of the Mediterranean Shipping Company (MSC), although MSC owns the aircraft and they are painted in MSC livery.

=== Passenger operations ===
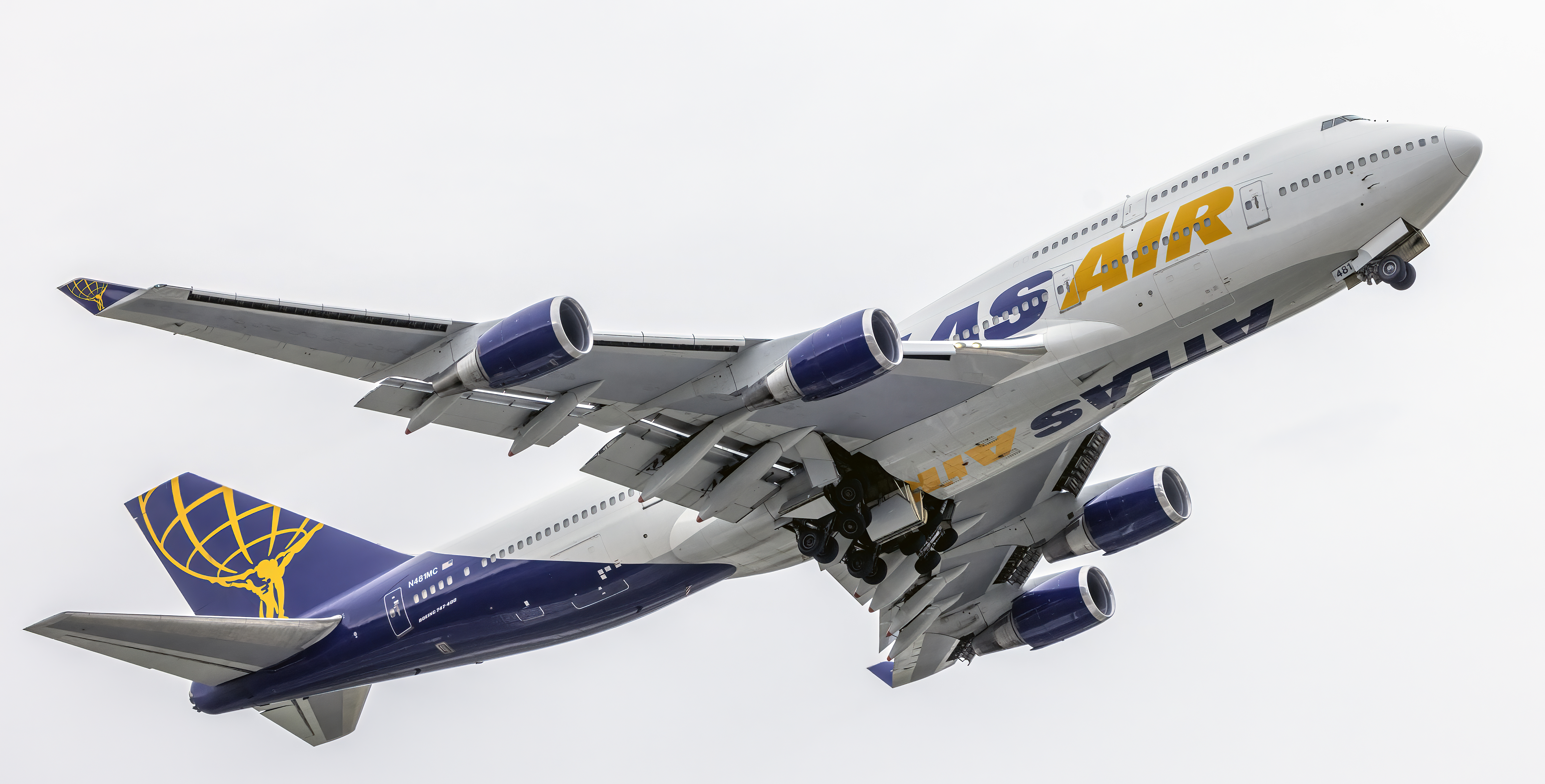
An Atlas Air Boeing 747-400

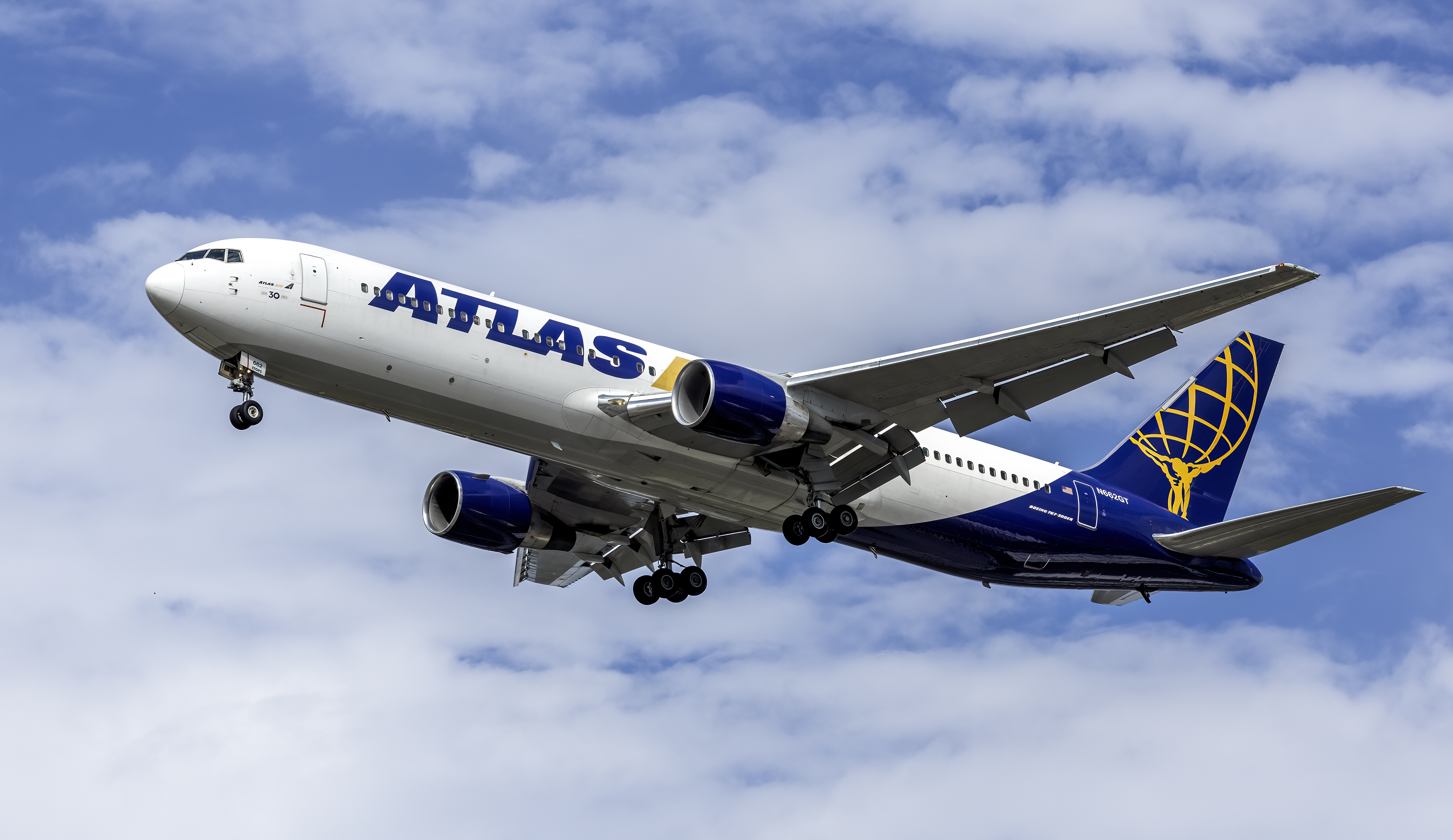
An Atlas Air Boeing 767-300ER

Atlas Air began operating a premium passenger private-charter service for the U.S.-Africa Energy Association in conjunction with SonAir in 2010. The charter service consisted of two customized Boeing 747-400 aircraft provided by SonAir. The aircraft were configured to serve 189 passengers in a three-class configuration. The charter service, which became known as the "Houston Express", included three dedicated weekly nonstop flights between Houston and Luanda, Angola. As of 2017, Atlas Air was the charter service for the Jacksonville Jaguars. As of 2021, Atlas Air owned a fleet of 10 B747 and B767 passenger aircraft available for lease in the passenger charter market.

== Fleet ==
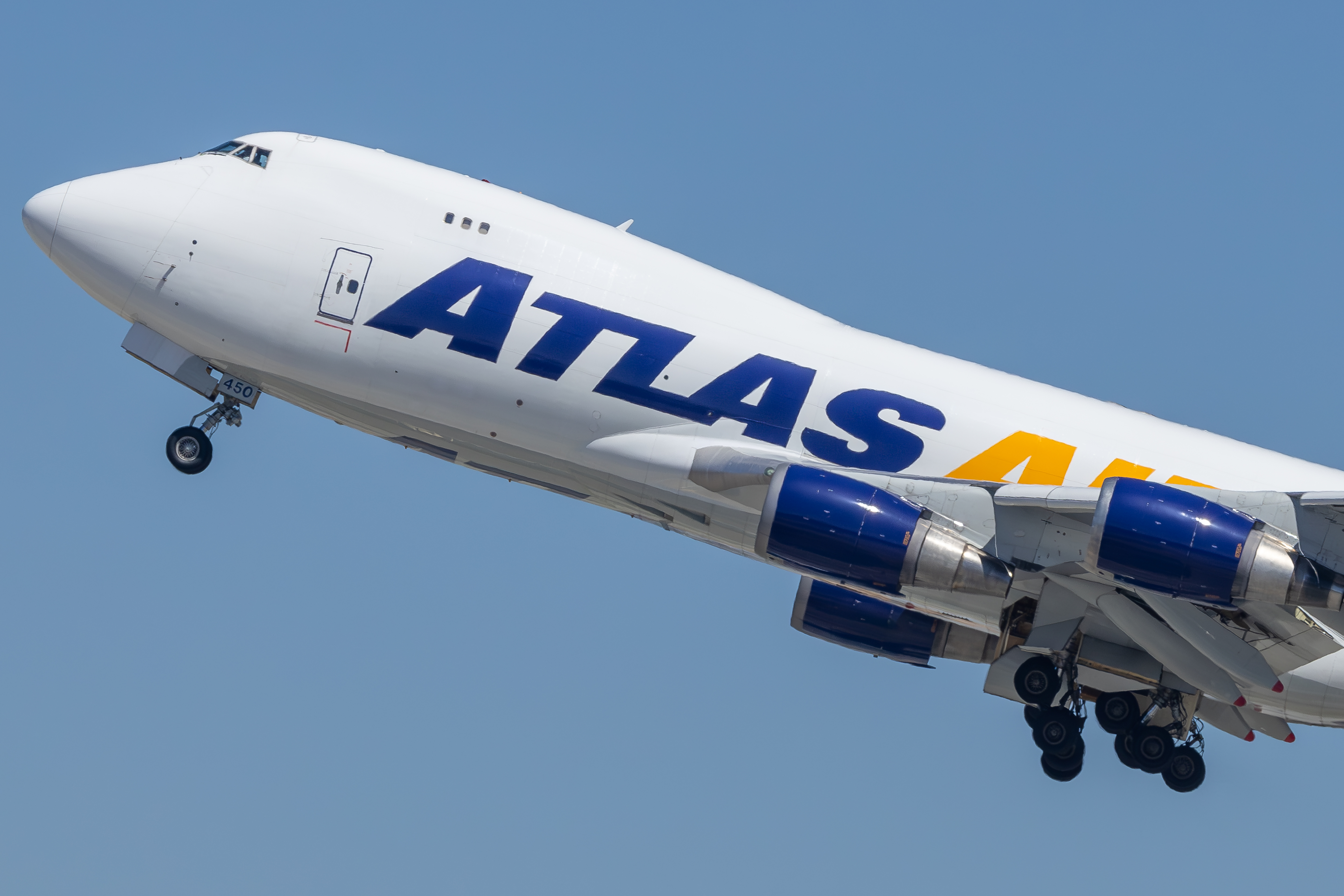
An Atlas Air Boeing 747-400F, the most numerous type in the fleet

As of March 2026, the fleet of Atlas Air consists of the following aircraft:

Aircraft	In service	Orders	Passengers					Notes
Aircraft	In service	Orders	F	C	Y+	Y	Total	Notes
Passenger fleet
Boeing 747-400	5	—	10	143	—	36	189	Used for VIP service.
Boeing 747-400	5	—	12	52	70	240	374	Used for VIP service.
Boeing 747-400	5	—	—	23	—	505	528	
Boeing 767-300ER	5	—	—	30	—	218	248	
Cargo fleet
Airbus A350F	—	20	Cargo					Largest customer of the type, deliveries 2029-2034, with 20 options and 20 purchase rights.
Boeing 747-400F	39	—	Cargo					
Boeing 747-400LCF	4	—	Cargo					
Boeing 747-8F	17	—	Cargo					
Boeing 767-300ERF	25	—	Cargo					
Boeing 777F	18	—	Cargo					
Total	113	20						

As of 2022, the airline operates six Boeing 777-200 freighter and two Boeing 767-300 freighter for DHL, five Boeing 747-400 freighter for Nippon Cargo Airlines, four 747-400 Dreamlifter for Boeing and eight Boeing 737-800 freighter for Amazon. As of 2023, Atlas Air operates two Boeing 747-8F for Kuehne + Nagel. As of March 2026, the airline operates four Boeing 777F for MSC Air Cargo.

== Accidents and incidents ==
- January 24, 2005: Atlas Air Flight 8995, a Boeing 747-212BSF, aircraft registration N808MC, overran the runway at Düsseldorf Airport due to poor braking action caused by unexpectedly heavy snow accumulation from an ongoing snowstorm. The aircraft was written off.
- February 2, 2008: Cargo aboard an Atlas Air Boeing 747-2D7B, N527MC, broke loose on takeoff from Lome Airport and penetrated the bulkhead, causing severe structural damage. The aircraft was written off.
- February 2010: The cover of part of the flaps on an Atlas Air Boeing 747 detached from the aircraft during landing in Miami, Florida. On May 17, 2010, a similar incident occurred when part of the inboard flaps on the right wing of an Atlas 747 separated from the aircraft. In May, alleging improper maintenance practices, the US Federal Aviation Administration proposed a fine of roughly US$500,000 against the airline.
- February 23, 2019: Atlas Air Flight 3591, a Boeing 767-375ER(BCF), N1217A, crashed into Trinity Bay near Houston on approach to George Bush Intercontinental Airport, killing both pilots and the single passenger, a commuting pilot from another airline. The US National Transportation Safety Board (NTSB) attributed the crash to pilot error and spatial disorientation; the NTSB also found that both pilots had experienced significant training difficulties and criticized Atlas Air's hiring practices.

== See also ==
- List of S&P 600 companies
