= Nusantara Buana Air Flight 823 =

2011 aviation accident in Indonesia

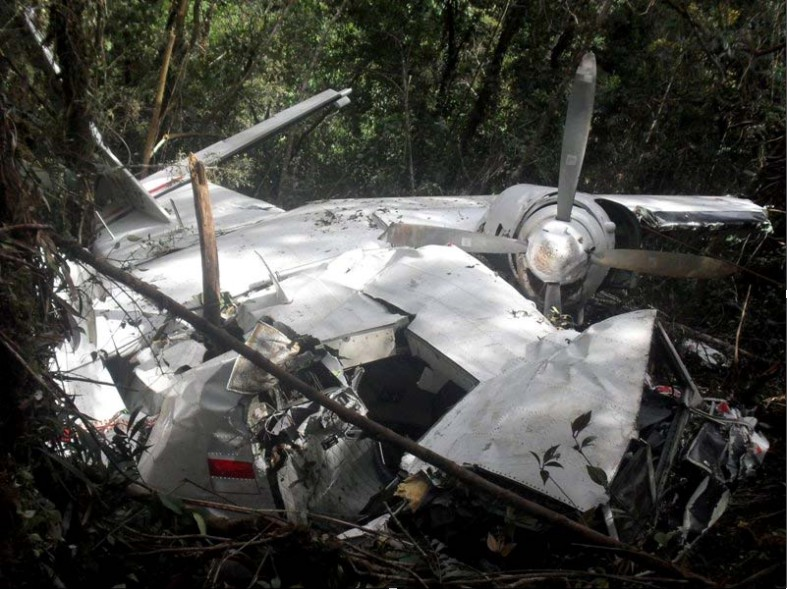
- The wreckage of flight 823 at the crash site

Accident
- Date: 29 September 2011
- Summary: Controlled flight into terrain due to loss of situational awareness
- Site: 16 nm south east of Kutacane, Indonesia; 03°24′00″N 098°01′00″E

Aircraft
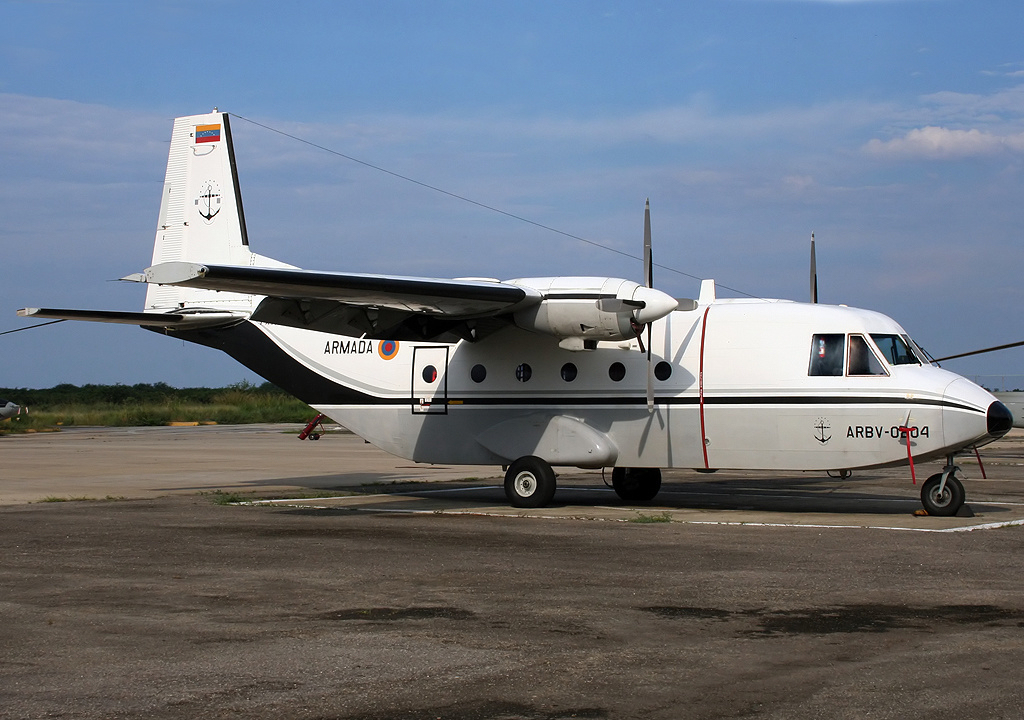
- A CASA C-212 Aviocar similar to the one involved
- Aircraft type: CASA C-212-200 Aviocar
- Operator: Nusantara Buana Air
- Registration: PK-TLF
- Flight origin: Polonia International Airport, Medan, Indonesia
- Destination: Alas Leuser Airport, Kutacane, Indonesia
- Occupants: 18
- Passengers: 16
- Crew: 2
- Fatalities: 18
- Survivors: 0

Nusantara Buana Air Flight 823 was a non-scheduled domestic passenger flight operated by a CASA C-212 Aviocar from Medan to Kutacane, Indonesia, that on 29 September 2011 crashed in the jungle, killing all 18 people on board.

The following investigation by the Indonesian National Transportation Safety Committee found that at the time of the accident the aircraft was flying in cloud, and the crew lost visual contact with the ground. The accident was classified as a controlled flight into terrain (CFIT).

== History of flight ==
The flight was operated by Nusantara Buana Air (NBA) as Nusantara Buana Air Flight 823, a non-scheduled passenger flight from Polonia International Airport, Medan, to Alas Leuser Airport, Kutacane. The aircraft departed from Medan at 07:28 LT (00:28 UTC) and expected to arrive at Kutacane at 00:58 UTC. There were two pilots and 16 passengers on board, including two children and two infants. The flight was conducted under visual flight rules (VFR).

At 00:32 UTC, the aircraft contacted Medan Director controller reported climbing passing 4000 to 8000 feet, informed the estimate time of arrival Kuta Cane to be at 0050 UTC, and also requested to fly direct to point “PAPA”. At about 00:41 UTC the aircraft reported established contact to Kuta Cane Radio. The communication with Medan Director controller was terminated. The pilot then attempted to contact Kuta Cane Radio three times but there was no reply.

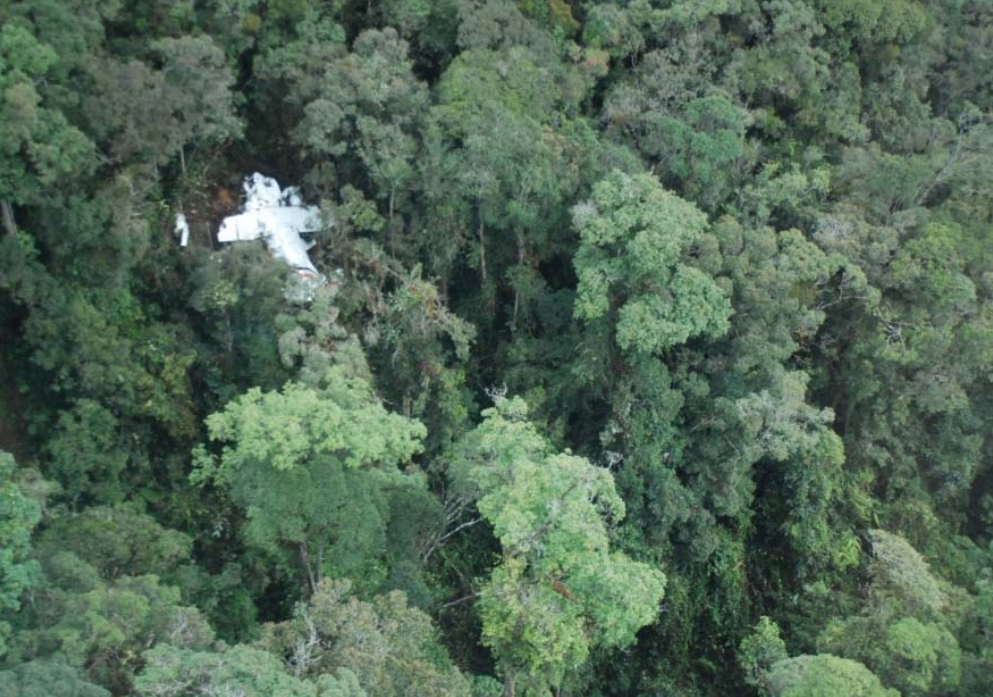
The overview wreckage of Flight 823

At about 00:50 UTC, the aircraft was last observed on the radar screen at a position about 35 nm from MDN VOR. At 0100 UTC, Kuta Cane airport authority contacted the NBA representative at Kuta Cane and asked the aircraft position. The NBA staff at Kuta Cane then contacted the NBA office in Medan and informed that the aircraft has not arrived at Kuta Cane. No distress signal was received from the aircraft.

At about 01:20 UTC, a Cessna Caravan operated by Susi Air flew from Kuta Cane to Medan and reported that the weather was Visual Meteorological Condition (VMC) and the wind was calm. Few clouds were observed at some mountain peaks. At about 0150 UTC, Medan Airport authority received information from the search and rescue office in Jakarta that an emergency locator transmitter signal had been detected.

At about 07:00 UTC, a search was initiated by two Cessna Caravans of Susi Air. They found the wreckage on a 70° slope at 5,055 feet altitude in the Mount Leuser National Park, 16 nm from Kuta Cane. The aircraft had been severely damaged in the impact, and none of the 18 occupants survived.

== Aircraft ==
The aircraft involved was a CASA C-212-200 Aviocar operated by Nusantara Buana Air. It was first flown in 1989 and it had a tail number of PK-TLF and a C/N/msn of 283/88N. There was no record of problems or mechanical defects with the aircraft at the time of the accident.

== Passengers and crew ==
There were 18 people on board, consisting of two pilots and 16 passengers including two children and two infants. The captain had 5,935 hours of flying experience and 3,730 hours on the CASA C-212. The first officer had 2,500 hours of flying experience and 1,100 hours on type. He was a former Indonesian Army pilot.

== Aftermath ==
After the crash, the Indonesian Government suspended Nusantara Buana Air's air operator's certificate, leaving all of its aircraft grounded.

== Investigation ==
From analysis of the cockpit voice recorder, the National Transportation Safety Committee (NTSC) concluded that the crew elected to continue flying into weather that was below VFR minima – that is, the minimum visibility and distance from cloud required to fly in accordance with visual flight rules, as the accident flight had planned to do.

The crew subsequently lost situational awareness until the aircraft impacted a mountainside, without any action being taken by the crew to avoid the impact. The report noted that the crew had not received CFIT-specific training nor the Approach and Landing Accident Reduction (ALAR) training.

Following the loss of Flight 823, Nusantara Buana Air took a number of safety measures, emphasizing the importance of maintaining visual meteorological conditions during VFR flights. The NTSC was satisfied that such measures were adequate, but issued further safety recommendations to the Indonesian Directorate General Civil Aviation to improve supervision of operators and the provision of CFIT and ALAR training to pilots.
