= CASA C-212 Aviocar =

Turboprop-powered cargo aircraft

C-212 Aviocar
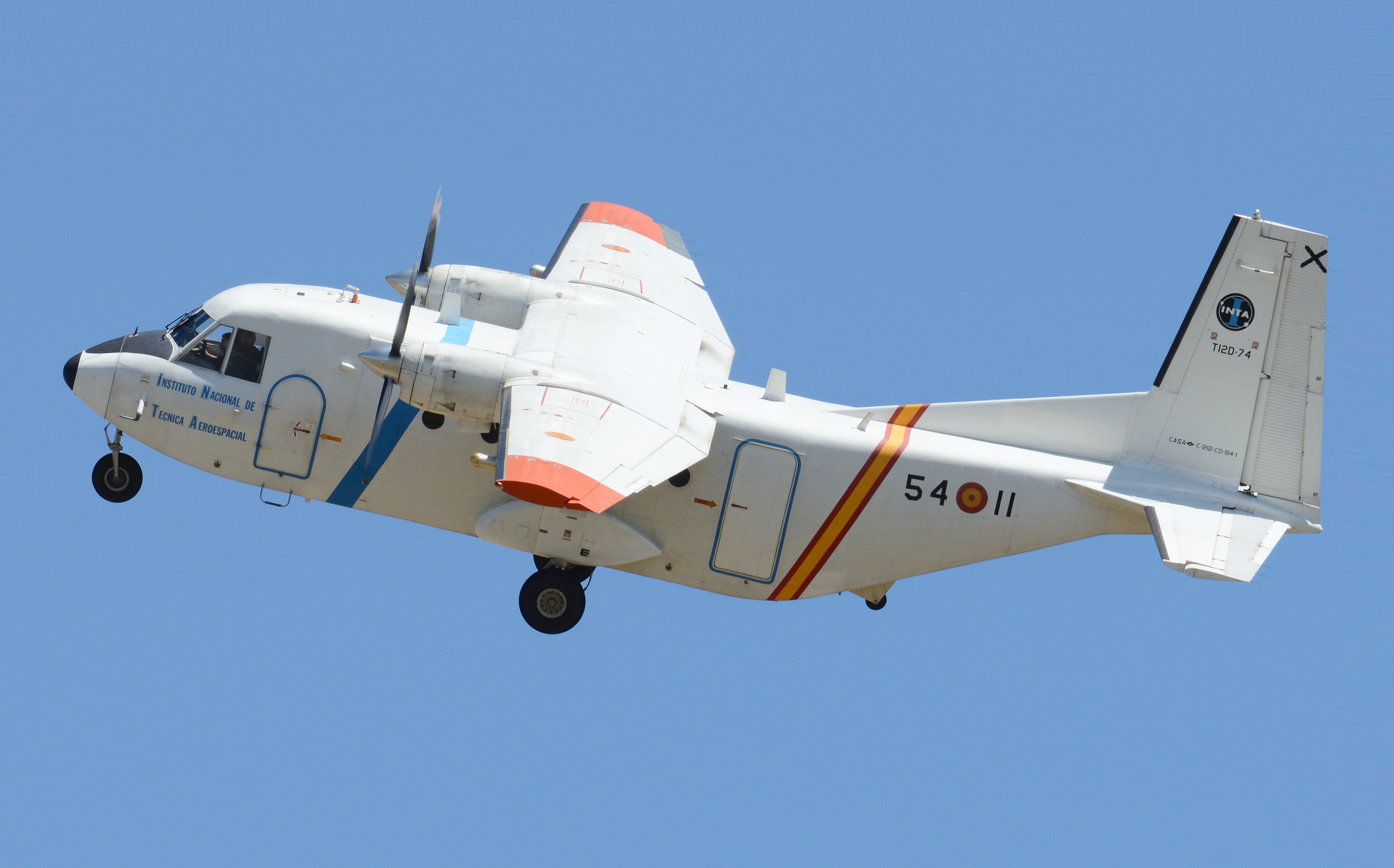
- A C-212 of the National Institute for Aerospace Technology

General information
- Type: Medium STOL military transport aircraft
- Manufacturer: Construcciones Aeronáuticas SA; EADS CASA; Indonesian Aerospace
- Status: Production in Indonesia
- Primary users: Indonesia (70) United States (37); Spain (26)
- Number built: 485 + >124 (IPTN/IAe)

History
- Manufactured: 1971–2009 (Spain), 1976-present (Indonesia)
- Introduction date: May 1974
- First flight: 26 March 1971
- Developed into: Indonesian Aerospace N-219

The CASA C-212 Aviocar is a turboprop-powered STOL medium cargo aircraft designed and built by Spanish aircraft manufacturer Construcciones Aeronáuticas SA (CASA). It is designed for use by both civil and military operators.

The C-212 was developed during the 1960s in response to the Spanish Air Force's need to replace much of its transport aircraft fleet; it was designed to perform numerous missions, including air medical services, paratrooper transport, and utility roles. Three years after its maiden flight on 26 March 1971, an order was secured from the Spanish Air Force. Several other customers emerged, initially from the military sector; but interest from civilian airliners also led CASA to develop a dedicated civil version of the C-212. Production of the type at the Seville facility would continue for 40 years, with 485 aircraft produced there.

Indonesia emerged as a key early customer for the C-212. In 1975, Indonesian aircraft company IPTN successfully secured the rights to license-produce the aircraft in Bandung, Indonesia. CASA assisted in the establishment of a production line there; by 2000, it had constructed 95 NC212s. The majority of Indonesian-built aircraft were sold to domestic customers, although some exports were also recorded in the Asian market. In February 2013, it was announced that Airbus (the successor company to CASA) had agreed on terms with Indonesian Aerospace/IAe (IPTN's successor) to fully transfer production of the C-212 to Indonesia. For a time, IAe produced both the NC212-200 and -400 upgrade. In 2014, IAe stopped producing the -400 series to focus on the improved NC212i model.

By December 2012, there were 92 operators of the C-212 around the world. These operators included numerous charter and short-haul aviation companies, as well as various national air services, which commonly used it for transport, surveillance, and search and rescue. The C-212 has been popular among skydivers and smokejumpers due to a rear ramp arrangement that is uncommon amongst its competitors. In particular, Australian airline Skytraders has used a number of C-212s to support Australian scientific research teams across Antarctica and the Southern Ocean.

== Development ==
During the late 1960s, the Spanish Air Force operated a number of outdated piston-engine transports, including the three-engine Junkers Ju 52 and two-engine Douglas C-47. Seeking to fulfil the service's transport modernisation needs, Spanish aircraft manufacturer Construcciones Aeronáuticas SA (CASA) developed a proposed aircraft, designated C-212. It was a twin-engine 18-seat transport aircraft capable of performing a variety of military roles, including passenger transport, air medical services, and paratrooper roles, while also being suitable for use by civil operators. On 26 March 1971, the first prototype conducted its maiden flight. In 1974, the Spanish Air Force decided to purchase the C-212, which had acquired the name Aviocar, in order to update its fleet.

Several airlines expressed interest in the C-212, particularly in light of its success with military operators; CASA thus decided to pursue development of a dedicated commercial version. In July 1975, the first examples of the civilian version were delivered. In 1997, the improved -400 model was introduced, featuring a glass cockpit and more powerful Honeywell TPE331 engines. In August 2006, a total of 30 CASA-built C-212s of all variants reportedly remained in airline service with various operators around the world.

In July 2010, Airbus Military CEO Domingo Urena-Raso stated that the company could no longer afford to produce the C-212 in Europe. Production of the type at Airbus' Seville facility progressively slowed to only four aircraft in two years. In December 2012, the final Spanish-assembled C-212 was delivered to its customer, the Vietnam Coast Guard. By the time the line shut down, it had produced 477 aircraft for 92 operators.

=== Indonesian production ===
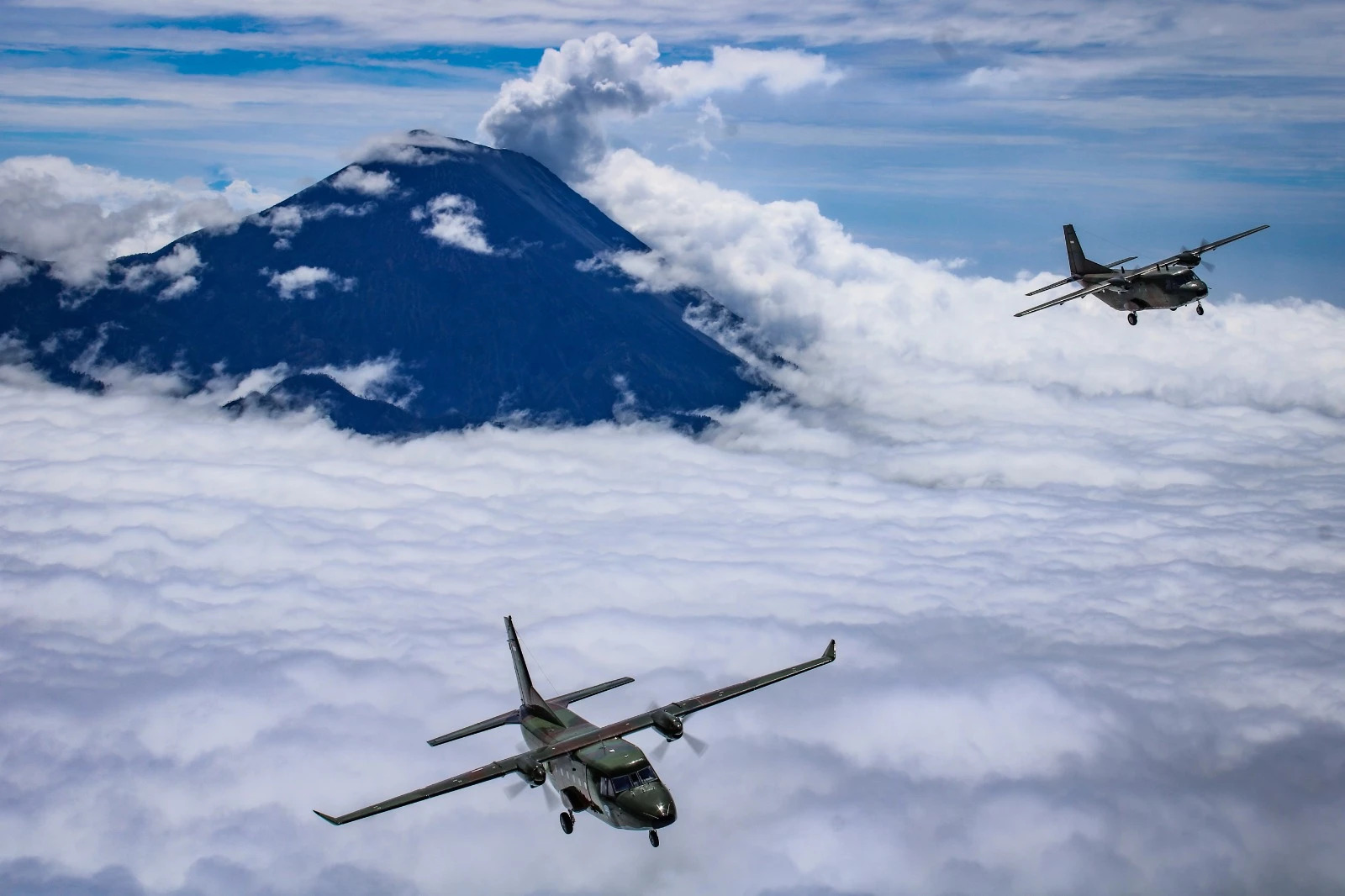
Indonesian Air Force NC212

In 1975, Indonesian aircraft company IPTN successfully negotiated terms with CASA to produce up to 108 C-212s under license in Indonesia. Accordingly, IPTN and Nurtanio took part in the manufacture of the aircraft, with assembly taking place at IPTN's facility in Bandung, Indonesia. CASA provided technical assistance to set up the production line, sending a delegation of technicians to Bandung to train local personnel. The relative simplicity of the C-212's design was credited with aiding the process.

Under the license terms, IPTN was permitted to sell the aircraft throughout the Asian market. But the majority of Indonesian-made NC212s were sold to domestic customers; by 1986, only six aircraft had reportedly been exported. By 2000, a total of 95 NC212s had been produced, though the type's production had become a secondary priority to other ventures such as the larger CASA/IPTN CN-235. IPTN also undertook development of more advanced versions of the aircraft. Between 2004 and 2008, all of the jigs and fixtures necessary to produce the NC212-400 were supplied by Airbus and installed at Bandung, enabling Indonesia to become the single-source manufacturer of this model. The licensing agreement was extended in 2006.

In July 2011, Airbus announced a strategic agreement to collaborate with Indonesian Aerospace/IAe (IPTN's successor) on the C-212. Under the agreement, Airbus undertook an 18-month first phase of support to IAe, after which it was to provide IAe increasing high-value industrial activity, including C-212 upgrades and production transference. In February 2013, their arrangement was formally extended to transfer production of the C-212 to Indonesia. For a time, IAe produced both the NC212-200 and -400 upgrade, which were equipped with new digital avionics, autopilot, and a redesigned cabin that could accommodate up to 28 passengers. In 2014, IAe stopped producing the -400 series to focus on the improved NC212i model.

== Design ==
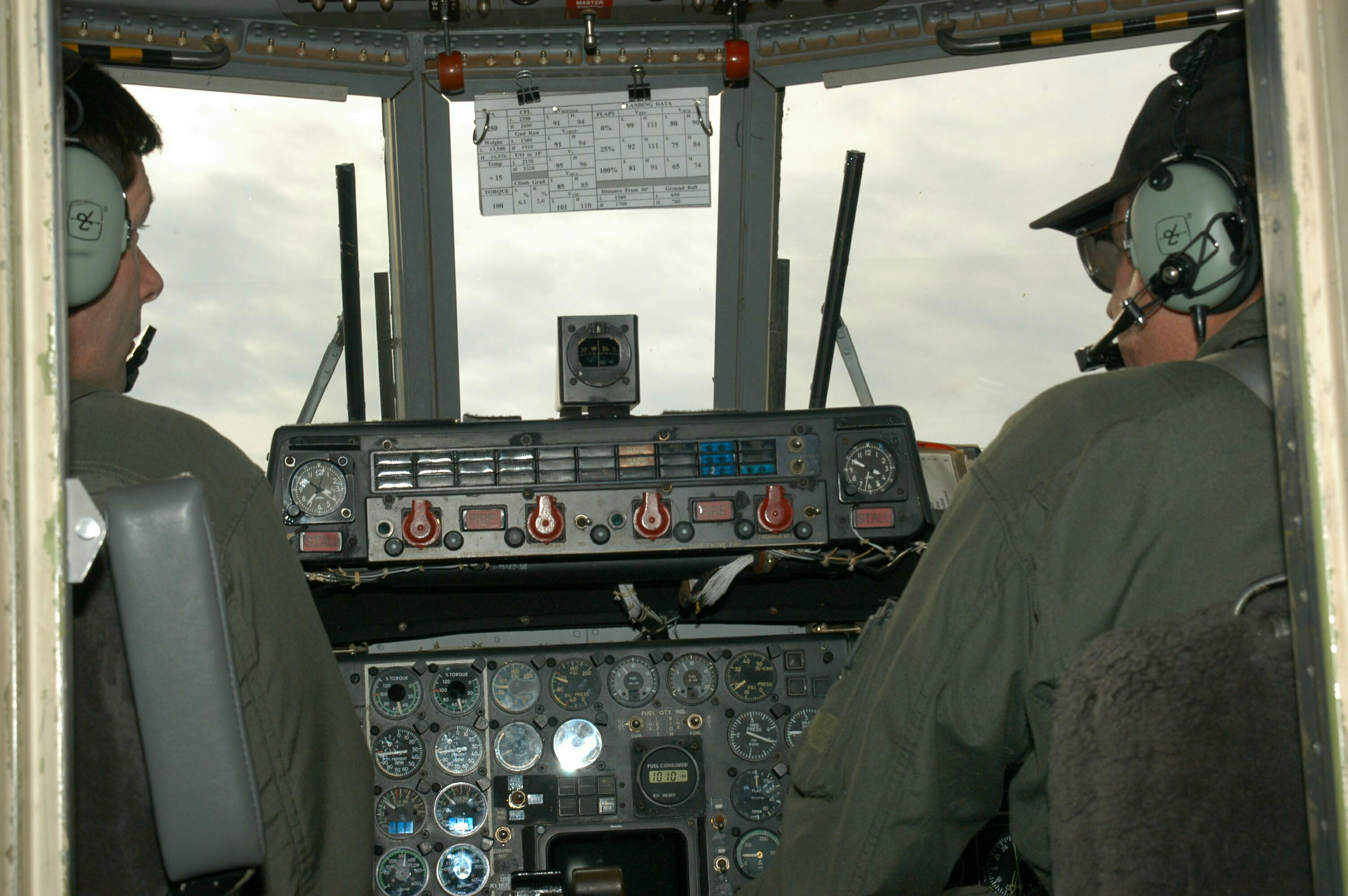
C-212 cockpit, February 2004

The CASA C-212 Aviocar is a turboprop-powered STOL-capable cargo aircraft. Its basic configuration includes a high-mounted wing, box-like fuselage, and conventional tail. The C-212 has been designed to operate in austere environments for extended periods without ground support apparatus. Features such as STOL performance and rugged landing gear fitted with low-pressure tyres enables it to operate from unpaved fields and under hot-and-high conditions. For greater simplicity, the aircraft's tricycle undercarriage is non-retractable.

The C-212 cabin has a maximum occupancy of 21 to 28 passengers. In a paratroop configuration, up to 24 paratroopers along with one jumpmaster can be accommodated on foldable sidewall seats, while in a mixed configuration, it can transport up to ten soldiers and a single vehicle. Since the C-212 does not have a pressurized fuselage, it is limited to relatively low-flight-level airline use (below 10,000 ft (3,000 m) MSL), and is thus suited for short legs and regional airline services.

== Operational history ==
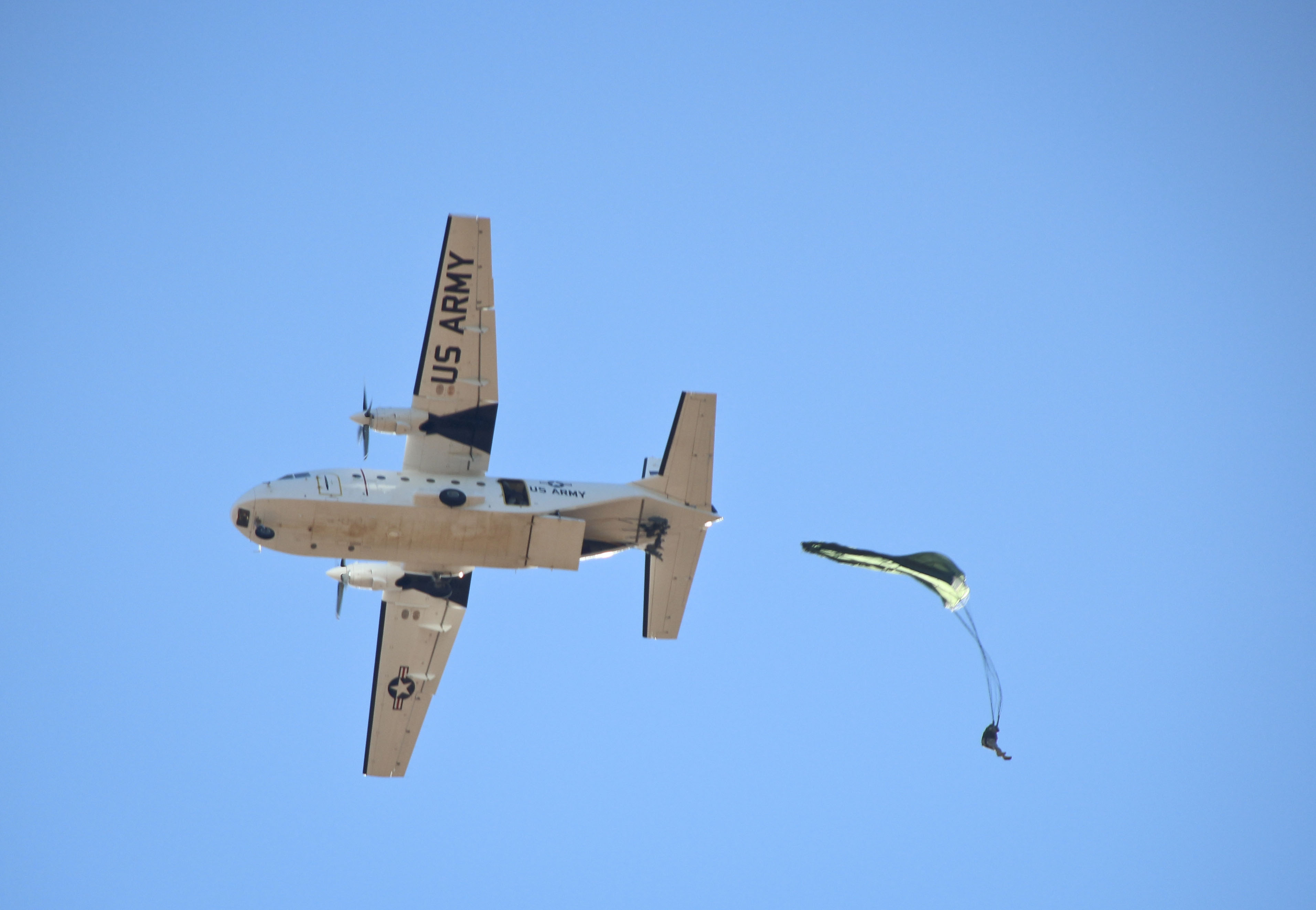
A paratrooper jumping from a C-212, December 2013

By 2013, 290 C-212s were reported to be flying in 40 countries; Indonesia had the most of the type, operating 70. It has seen especially wide employment as a commuter airliner and a military aircraft, with operators including numerous charter and short-haul aviation companies, as well as several national air forces. The C-212 is commonly used in transport, surveillance, and search and rescue roles.

The C-212 has also been used by the U.S. Army Special Operations Command, where it operates under the designation C-41A and is commonly used for troop infiltration and exfiltration, supply drops, and airborne operations. In August 2010, Airbus Military received a contract for the sustainment and modernisation of five C-212-200s operated by the U.S. Army Special Operations Aviation Command (USASOAC). Additional aircraft were both owned and operated by private military contractor Blackwater; these were active during both the Iraq War and War in Afghanistan, typically to conduct supply drops to US ground forces in remote areas there. During the conflict, the planes were piloted by former pilots from the 160th "Night Stalkers" Special Operations Regiment.

One particularly ambitious use of the C-212 was undertaken by Australian airline Skytraders, which has used its fleet to support Australia’s scientific research assets across Antarctica and the Southern Ocean. Various operators have elected to operate their aircraft out of inhospitable terrain, such as desert and jungles. The C-212's uncommon rear ramp arrangement is a unique selling point amongst competitors, and it has been a popular aircraft for skydivers and smokejumpers.

== Variants ==
=== 100 Series ===
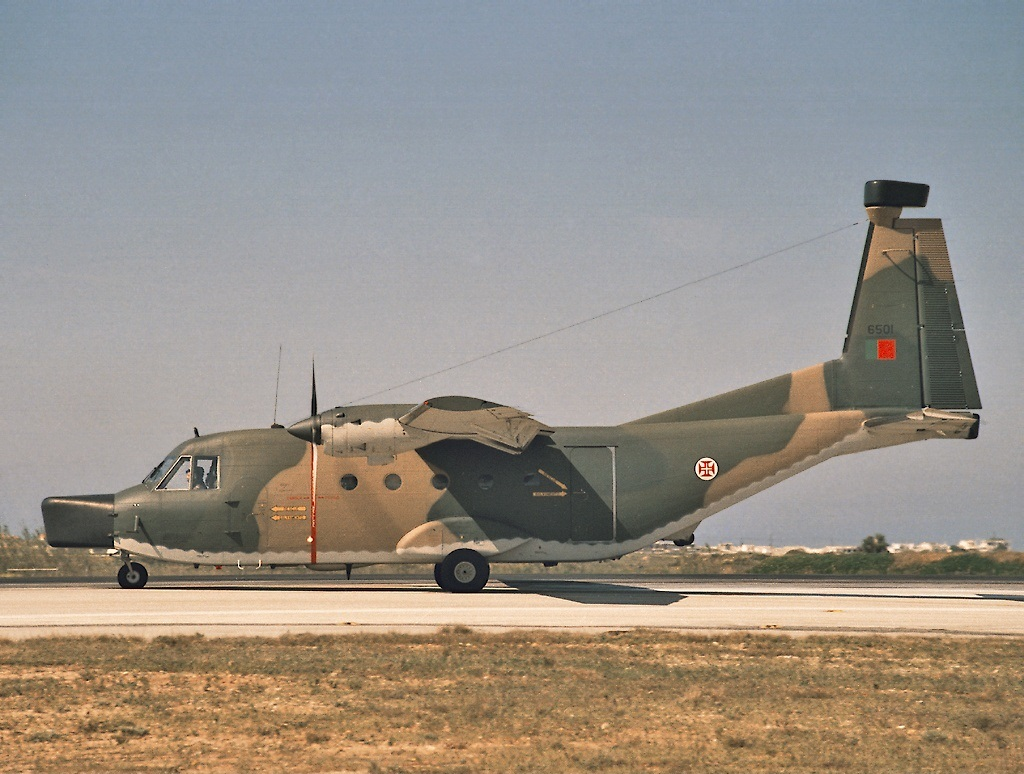
Electronic-countermeasure- equipped C-212-200 of the Portuguese Air Force, late 1980s

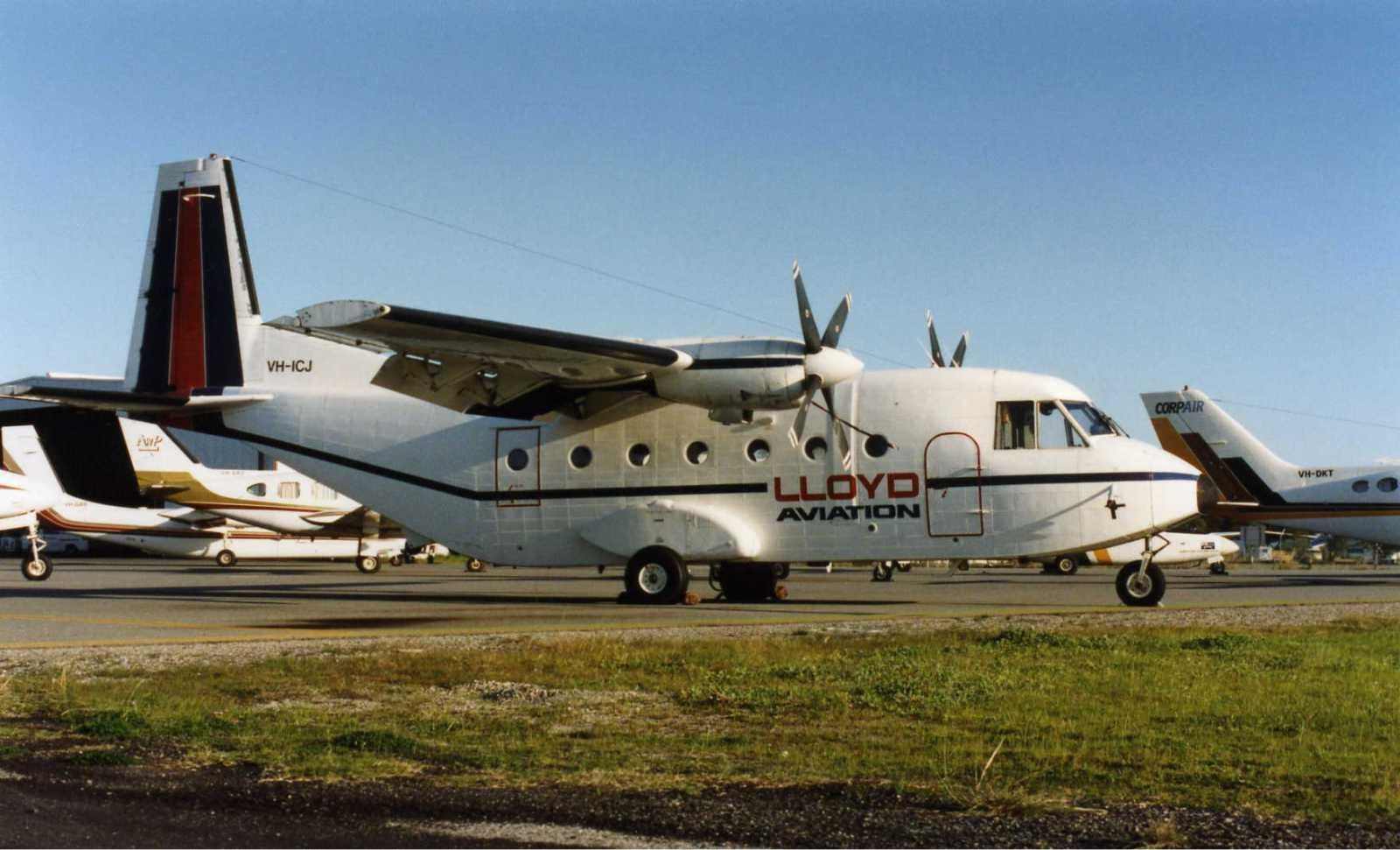
Lloyd Aviation C-212 at Perth Airport, early 1990s

C-212A
Original military production version. Also known as C-212-5, C-212-5 series 100M, and by the Spanish Air Force as the T-12B and D-3A (for medevac aircraft), 129 built.
C-212AV
VIP transport version, T-12C.
C-212B
Six pre-production C-212As converted for photo-reconnaissance missions, TR-12A.
C-212C
Original civil version.
C-212D
Two pre-production C-212As converted for use as navigational trainers, TE-12B.
NC212-100
Manufactured under licence in Indonesia since 1976. IPTN produced 28 NC212-100s before switching to NC212-200s.

=== 200 Series ===
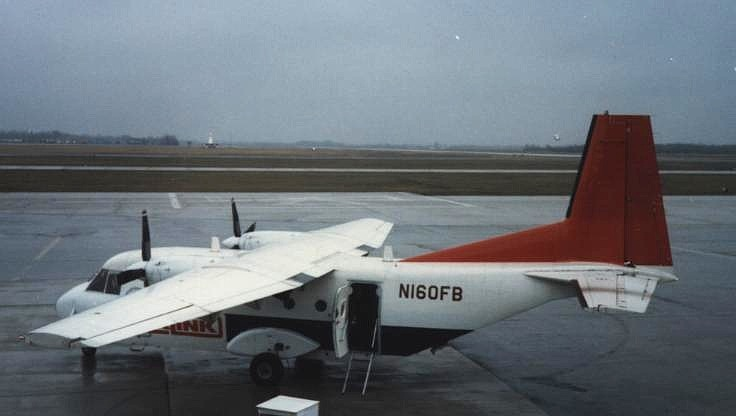
Northwest Airlink CASA C-212-200 operating a scheduled flight in Flint, Michigan, April 1986

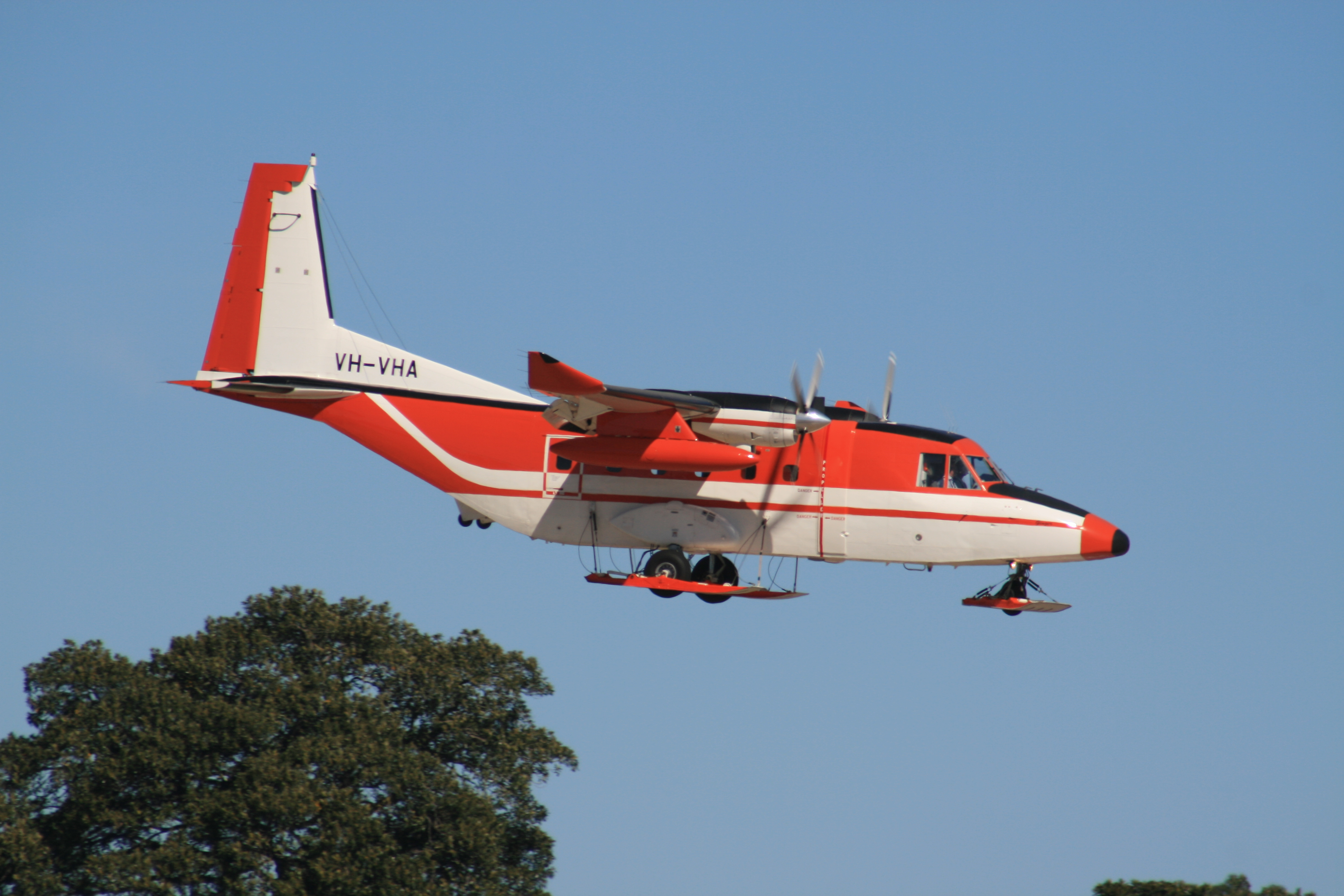
Skytraders ski-equipped CASA 212–400, used by the Australian Antarctic Division

Stretched version with updated engines (Honeywell TPE331-10R-511C or −512C, rated at 670 kW (900 shp) each, introduced in 1979. The CASA C-212-200 is also a popular skydiving aircraft, known for its large capacity, fast climbing, and large tailgate exit ramp.

C-212 series 200M
Military version known as T-12D in the Spanish service and Tp 89 for the Swedish Air Force. Specialised ASW and maritime patrol aircraft have been built from this version.
NC212-200
C-212-200 built under licence by IPTN.
NC212-200 MPA
C-212-200 built under licence by IPTN, designed as a Maritime Patrol Aircraft.

=== 300 Series ===
Standard production version from 1987 on. Engines were Honeywell TPE331-10R-513C, also rated at 670 kW (900 shp) continuous, 690 kW (925 shp) maximum. The propellers were changed from four-bladed Hartzell composite blade propellers to four-bladed Dowty-Rotol all-metal propellers. Winglets and a larger vertical stabilizer area provided improved performance, and the addition of a nose baggage compartment gave the nose a more streamlined look than the 200 series. Various systems were incrementally upgraded, including the addition of an integrated autopilot system.

C-212-M series 300 (300M series)
Military version.
C-212 series 300 airliner
26 seat regional airliner.
C-212 series 300 utility
23 seat civil utility version.
C-212 series 300P
Civil utility version with Pratt & Whitney Canada PT6A-65 engines.

=== 400 Series ===
Upgraded version with 690 kW (925 shp) TPE331-12JR-701C engines, increased payload, and upgraded avionics moved from under the floor to the nose. First flew 4 April 1997, replacing 300 series in production from 1998. The C-212-400 received Spanish certification in 1998. Between 2004 and 2008, production jigs and fixtures for the NC212-400 were relocated to Bandung from San Pablo, Spain, and IAe became the sole manufacturer of the NC212 family. In 2014, NC212-200 and NC212-400 production ended and production was shifted to the improved NC212i version.

=== NC212i ===
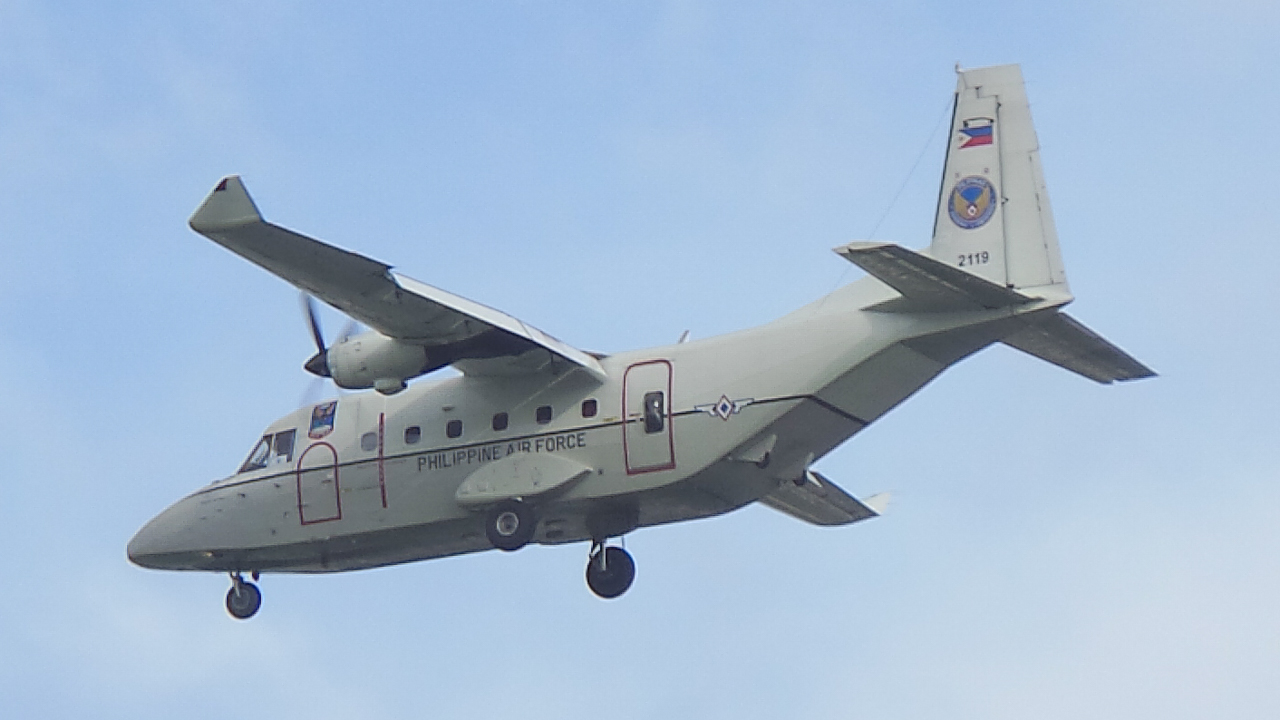
Philippines Air Force NC212i

Improved version of -400 series, using two Honeywell TPE331-12JR-701C turboprop engines, with a maximum output of 723 kW (970 hp). The rotor is the four-bladed Dowty Rotol R334/4-82-F/13 constant speed propeller with a 2.75 m (110-inch) diameter.

On 3 November 2022, Indonesian Aerospace and MT Propeller signed the General Purchase Agreement (GPA) for the Procurement of five-blades MTV-27 Propellers for the NC212i Aircraft. MTV-27 propellers are produced by MT Propeller, Germany and have been certified by EASA.

== Operators ==
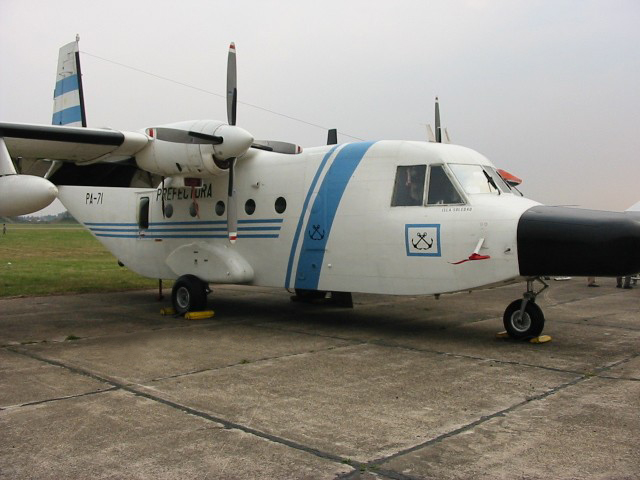
Argentine Coast Guard Aviocar

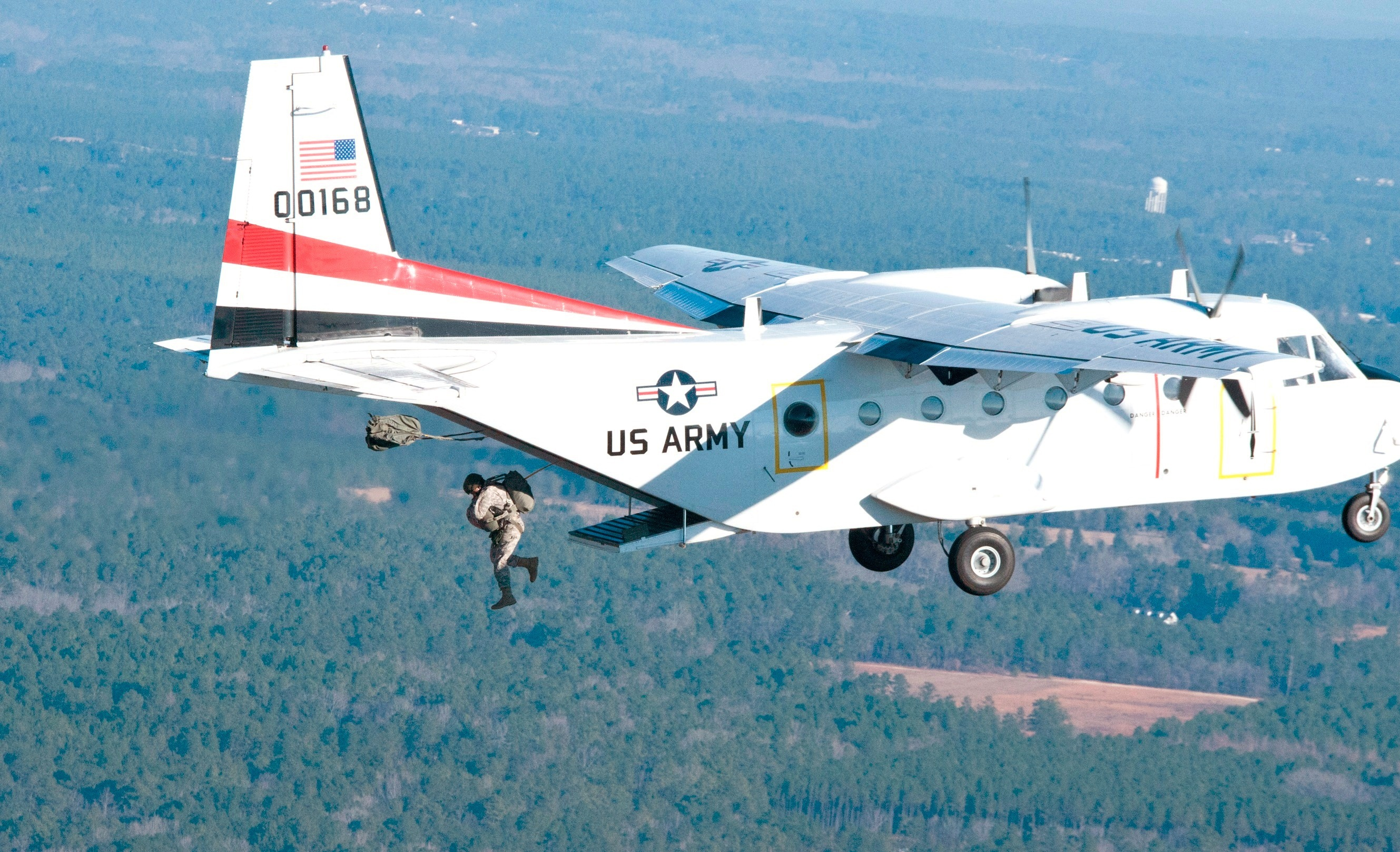
USASOAC C-212 conducting static-line parachute operations

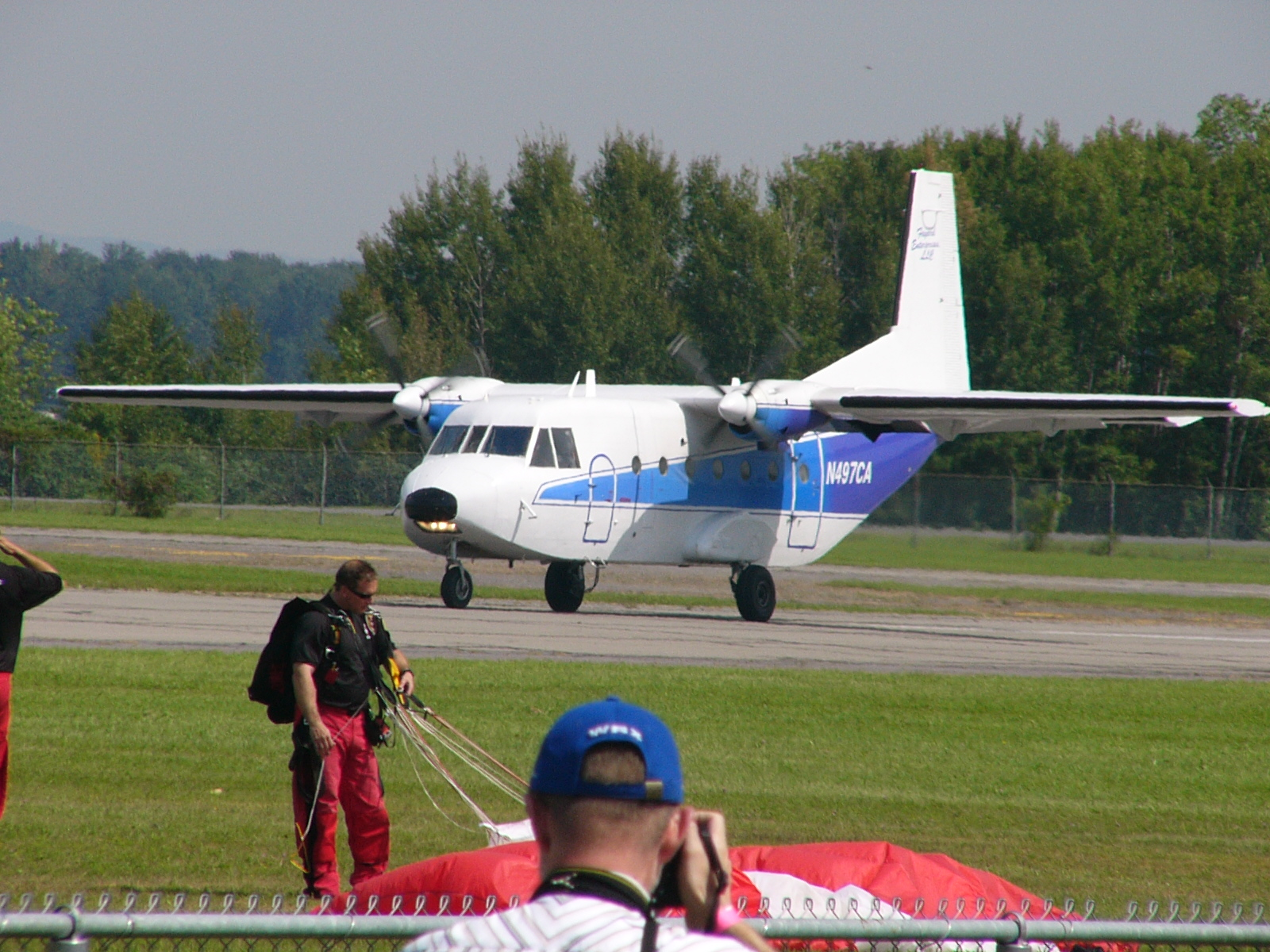
CASA CN 212-200 used for parachuting by the SkyHawks Parachute Team

=== Civil operators ===
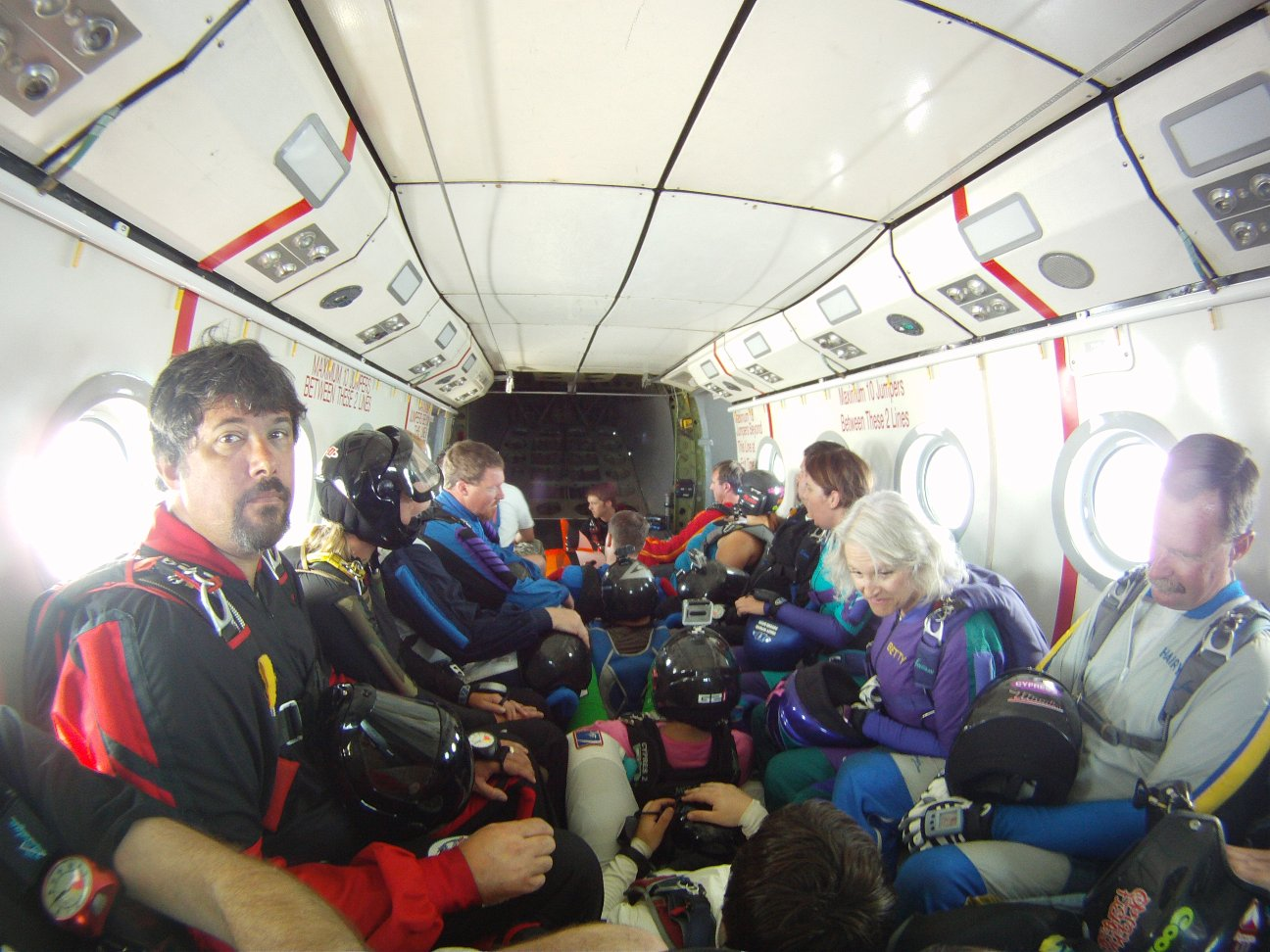
Skydivers waiting to jump from a CASA C-212, June 2011

Australia

- Australian Antarctic Division

Bosnia and Herzegovina

- B&H Airlines – former operator

Indonesia

- Airmark Indonesia
- Assessment and Application of Technology Research Organization (BPPT)
- Airfast Indonesia
- Bouraq Indonesia Airlines
- Deraya Air Taxi
- Dirgantara Air Service
- Indonesian National Police
- Merpati Nusantara Airlines
- Nusantara Buana Air (NBA)
- Pelita Air
- Sabang Merauke Raya Air Charter – former operator
- Susi Air – operating for Transwisata
- Transwisata Prima Aviation

Portugal

- Sevenair - six former Portuguese Air Force aircraft bought in 2018

United States

- Air Miami
- Bar Harbor Airlines
- Bighorn Airways
- Boston-Maine Airways – operating code share service as Pan Am Express on behalf of Pan Am
- Chaparral Airlines – operating code share service as American Eagle on behalf of American Airlines
- CHI Aviation
- Coastal Airlines
- Evergreen International Airlines
- Executive Airlines – operating code share service as American Eagle in the Caribbean from San Juan, Puerto Rico (SJU) on behalf of American Airlines
- Fischer Brothers Aviation – operating code share service as Northwest Airlink on behalf of Northwest Airlines and also operating code share service as Allegheny Commuter
- Gulf Air – operating code share service as Air Florida Commuter on behalf of Air Florida
- Inland Empire Airways
- Jet Express – operating code share service as Trans World Express (TWE) on behalf of Trans World Airlines (TWA)
- Mountain Air Cargo
- North American Airlines
- Oceanair
- Presidential Airways – Owned and operated by the private military contractor Blackwater
- Prinair
- U.S. Drug Enforcement Administration
- Bering Air
- Ryan Air Services

=== Military operators ===
==== Current operators ====
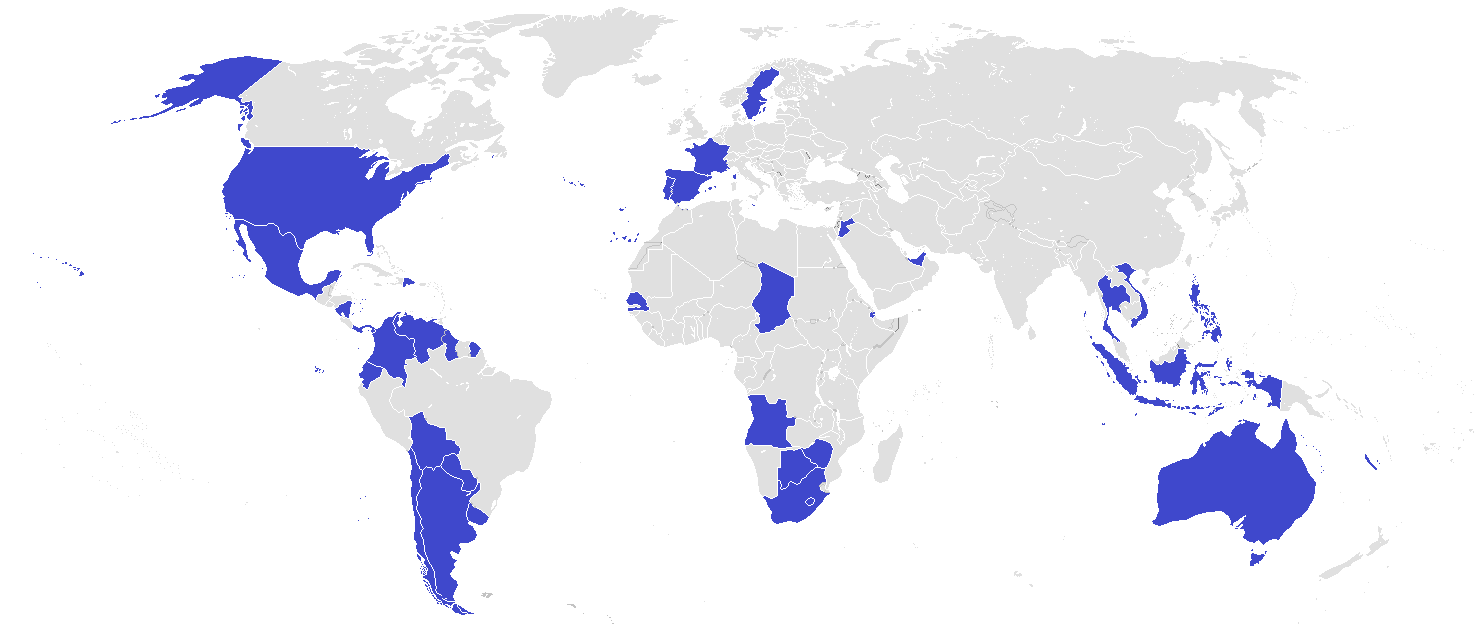
CASA C-212 military operators

Abu Dhabi

- Abu Dhabi Air Force – four delivered 1982

Angola

- Angolan Air Force - twelve aircraft ordered in 1985; eight delivered that same year, and the remaining four in 1986. Two aircraft operational as of December 2021.

Argentina

- Argentine Coast Guard – five delivered 1988–1990
- Argentine Army Aviation – Three C-212

Australia

- Australian Army - Two Skytraders leased C-212-400 for ADF Parachuting School.

Bolivia

- Bolivian Air Force – one delivered 1989
- Bolivian Army

Bophuthatswana

- Bophuthatswana Air Force – one delivered 1985, to South African Air Force.

Botswana

- Botswana Defence Force Air Wing - three in service as of December 2021

Chad

- Chadian Air Force – two delivered in 1988

Chile

- Chilean Air Force – six delivered 1978, three in service as of 2015.
- Chilean Army – former Spanish Air Force aircraft. C-212-100s being phased out and put up for sale. Two in service as of December 2015.
- Chilean Navy – four delivered 1978

Colombia

- Colombian Aerospace Force - four in service as of December 2021
- Colombian National Army Aviation - All three retired in 2025
- Colombian Navy
- SATENA – nine delivered 1984–1989

Djibouti

- Djibouti Air Force

Dominican Republic

- Dominican Republic Air Force - Received three CASA 212-400s between 2000–2001. All three remain in service as of December 2023

Ecuador

- Ecuadorian Army - one in service as of December 2021

Equatorial Guinea

- Equatorial Guinea Air Force

France

- French Air and Space Force – five delivered 1988

Indonesia

- Indonesian Army - six in service as of December 2021
- Indonesian Navy - fourteen in service as of December 2021, with six in a maritime patrol aircraft configuration
- Indonesian Air Force - ten aircraft in service as of December 2021, with eight currently on order.

Jordan

- Royal Jordanian Air Force – four delivered 1975–1976, with two attrition replacement aircraft delivered 1983–84 and a further, surveillance-configured example purchased in 1985. One operational 2015.

Lesotho

- Lesotho Defence Force – 2 aircraft operational as of December 2021

Mexico

- Mexican Navy – 7 active as of December 2021

Nicaragua

- Nicaraguan Air Force – four delivered 1977–1978

Panama

- National Aeronaval Service – six delivered 1982–1988. 3 aircraft operational as of December 2021

Paraguay

- Paraguayan Air Force – four C.212-200 delivered 1984 and one C.212–400 delivered in 2003. 3 aircraft operational as of December 2021

Philippines

- Philippine Air Force - 2 units NC212i ordered in 2014 delivered in 2018. Both of them are operational as of December 2021. Six more were ordered by the PAF on 13 April 2023, totalling eight aircraft.

Portugal

- Portuguese Air Force – 24 delivered between 1974 and 1976. Retired in 2011, replaced by EADS CASA C-295.

Senegal

- Senegalese Air Force - two C212 maritime patrol aircraft on order

South Africa

- South African Air Force - two C212 operational as of December 2021

Spain

- Spanish Air and Space Force – 80 delivered between 1974 and 1984, with eleven still operational as of December 2021

Suriname

- Surinam Air Force – two delivered in 1999, one is a C.212-400MPA. Both sold to Botswana Defence Force via Fayard Enterprise in 2014.

Sweden

- Swedish Navy – one delivered in 1986

Thailand

- Royal Thai Army - two operational as of December 2021

Transkei

- Transkei Defence Force – two delivered in 1986; passed on to the South African Air Force.

United States

- United States Air Force – as C-41A.
- United States Army

Uruguay

- Uruguayan Air Force – five delivered 1981–1982; all of them are still operational as of December 2021.

Venda

- Venda Defence Force to South African Air Force.

Venezuela

- Venezuelan Navy - five aircraft operational as of December 2021

Vietnam

- Vietnam People's Air Force - three NC212i has been commissioned by December 2021
- Vietnam Coast Guard – two C-212–400

Zimbabwe

- Air Force of Zimbabwe – nine operational as of December 2021

==== Former operators ====
Malta

- Air Wing of the Armed Forces of Malta – The Air Wing operated a single example in 2009.

== Incidents and accidents ==
As of September 2011, CASA C-212s have been involved in 71 hull-loss incidents with a total of 558 fatalities.

5 July 1978
A Portuguese Air Force Aviocar crashed into the Santa Barbara Volcano, on the Azores island of Terceira, killing all three military personnel on board.
2 January 1984
A Royal Jordanian Air Force CASA 212-A3 Aviocar 100 crashed near Al Qatrana, Jordan due to mechanical problems. All 13 people on board the plane were killed.
4 March 1987
Northwest Airlink Flight 2268 crashed while landing at Detroit Metropolitan Wayne County Airport in Romulus, Michigan. Nine of the 19 passengers and crew on board were killed.
8 May 1987
American Eagle Flight 5452 crashed while landing in Puerto Rico, killing two.
2 August 1988
Operated by Geoterrex of Ottawa, Canada, the aircraft crashed on approach to Reykjavík, Iceland, with the loss of all 3 people on board. The cause was that "the crew lost control of the aircraft, most probably because of large fluctuations in the power output of the right engine caused by the shift of an incorrectly installed speeder spring in the right propeller governor."
1 December 1989
A U.S. Army C-212-200 crashed into the Patuxent River while trying to land at the Naval Air Test Center, Patuxent River, Maryland, killing all five people on board.
16 January 1990
SANSA Flight 32 crashed into the Cerro Cedral Mountain in Costa Rica shortly after takeoff from Juan Santamaria International Airport in San Jose. All 20 passengers and three crew on board died in the crash.
23 January 1990
A Venezuelan Navy C-212 crashed into a mountain due to poor weather, killing all 24 people on board.
27 March 1990
An Angolan government C-212 was shot down by UNITA rebels near Cuito, killing all 25 people on board.
9 July 1991
A C-212 of Peruvian regional airline Aerochasqui (reg. OB-1218, cn. 232) was shot down by small arms fire from Peruvian National Police elements, who wanted to conduct an anti-narcotics search on the aircraft, as it was taking off from the airstrip in Bellavista, San Martín Region. All 15 occupants were killed in the incident.
7 June 1992
American Eagle Flight 5456, a CASA C-212 flying from Fernando Luis Ribas Dominicci Airport in San Juan, Puerto Rico crashed short of the runway in Mayagüez, killing both crew members and all three passengers. The investigation led to the discontinuation of use of the C-212 by American Eagle.
8 March 1994
A Spanish Air Force C-212, part of the Ala 37 deployed in Vicenza, Italy, was hit in the tail by an SA-7 missile, allegedly fired by Serb rebels. This occurred east of Rijeka while ferrying UNPROFOR personnel from Zagreb to Split. The tail control surfaces were damaged, the left engine failed and four passengers were injured by splinters. The crew managed to land the aircraft at Rijeka Airport. Spanish technicians were able to repair the damage and had the aircraft back in service within 48 hours.
27 August 1994
A DEA-operated aircraft (reg. N119CA) crashed into a mountain (or at the end of a box canyon) north of Puerto Pizana in the Amazonian jungle department of San Martín, Peru. The crash occurred while flying from Santa Lucia to Pucallpa in the Huallaga River Valley region, and killed the CASA's five occupants, all DEA Special Agents. The accident reportedly took place under bad weather and low-visibility conditions during a counter-narcotics reconnaissance operation. The accident precipitated the end of Operation Snowcap, under which the ill-fated flight took place.
17 June 1995
An Angolan Air Force C-212 carrying members of a local football club crashed while on approach to Catumbela Airport, killing 48 of the 53 people aboard.
7 December 1996
Dirgantara Air Service Flight 5940 crashed into a gas plant shortly after takeoff. 17 people, including one on the ground, died at the scene, a 12-year-old child died on the way to the hospital, and a worker at the gas plant died at the hospital. Only one passenger survived.
27 November 2004
"Blackwater 61" Presidential Airways CASA C-212-200 (registration N960BW / serial number 231) was contracted by the U.S. Department of Defense to supply American forces deployed in remote areas of Afghanistan. The aircraft entered a box canyon and struck the 14,650-foot (4,470 m) level of Baba Mountain, which has a peak elevation of 16,739 feet (5,102 m). The flight was about 25 nmi (46 km) north of the typical route between Bagram and Farah.
22 February 2005
An Indonesian National Police C-212 experienced engine trouble during landing, causing it to crash into the sea. Of the 18 police officers on board, 15 were killed.
26 October 2006
Swedish Coast Guard CASA C-212-200 (registration SE-IVF / serial number KBV 585) crashed in the Falsterbo Canal during a surveillance mission, killing all four on board. Eyewitness accounts suggested the accident was caused by the right wing somehow detaching. The Swedish Accident Investigation Board's preliminary report suggested that the wing detached due to a fatigue crack which had developed in its load-bearing structure.
15 November 2006
Mexican Navy CASA 212-200 Maritime Patrol (serial number AMP-114) crashed in the sea on the Campeche coast over the Gulf of Mexico during a surveillance mission. All crew members survived; the cause of the accident is still unknown.
26 June 2008
Indonesian Military CASA C-212 was flying from the Jakarta to Bogor, carrying 12 military personnel and six civilians, and was due to test a digital mapping camera, but it disappeared in the Salak Mountain region, about 90 km (56 mi) south of the capital. An air force spokesman said the aircraft was assumed to have crashed.
9 October 2009
Uruguayan Air Force CASA C-212 FAU-531, operated as part of the U.N. Stabilization Mission in Haiti, crashed west of Fonds-Verettes, killing all 11 on board.
19 June 2010
A Cameroon Aéro-Service CASA C-212 chartered by Sundance Resources crashed in dense jungle after departing Cameroon for the Congo, killing all 11 people on board, including Australian mining magnate Ken Talbot and Sundance personnel: Chairman Geoff Wedlock, Chief Executive Officer Don Lewis, company secretary John Carr-Gregg and non-executive directors John Jones and Craig Oliver. At the time of the accident, Talbot was a director of Sundance and its largest shareholder.
12 February 2011
Sabang Merauke Raya Air Charter CASA C-212, PK-ZAI, carrying five crew, crashed after takeoff from Batam, Indonesia, during a test flight following engine maintenance. All five crew members were killed.
1 April 2011
FUGRO Aviation Canada Limited CASA C-212, C-FDKM, carrying three crew, crashed while attempting to land at Saskatoon Airport, Saskatoon, Saskatchewan, Canada, after declaring an emergency with an engine failure. The aircraft crashed on Wanuskewin Drive in Saskatoon and hit a concrete barrier, resulting in one death and two injuries aboard.
2 September 2011
A Chilean Air Force CASA C-212, carrying 21 people, crashed 500 miles (800 km) from Chile's Pacific coastline in the Juan Fernández Islands, with no survivors. Felipe Camiroaga, a highly popular Chilean TV presenter, was one of the passengers, along with businessman Felipe Cubillos, who had been working on post-earthquake reconstruction efforts. An official inquiry concluded that the cause of the accident was loss of control while approaching the runaway at low alttitude, due to a combination of wind shear, strong turbulence, two counter-rotating vortexes and strong crosswinds.
29 September 2011
An Indonesian Aerospace CASA C-212 (registration PK-TLF, built in 1989) was carrying 18 people from Medan, North Sumatra to Kutacane, Aceh. Operated by Nusantara Buana Air, the aircraft crashed into Gunung Kapur, a 1,600-metre-high (5,200 ft) mountain in the Bukit Barisan range, near the village of Bukit Lawang, Bohorok District. There were no survivors among the 14 passengers, three crew and pilot. The accident occurred between 07:28 and 08:05 local time, approximately 58 km (36 miles) northwest of Medan, North Sumatra.
16 June 2016
A Vietnam Coast Guard CASA C-212-400 from Gia Lam Airport en route to the Gulf of Tonkin crashed during a search for a Su-30MK2 and its pilots downed a few days before. All nine C-212 crew members were lost. The crash site was initially reported to be located 44 nautical miles (81 km) south-southwest of Bach Long Vi Island. By 18 June 2016, some debris had been found, but there was no sign of the crew. The Vietnamese Coast Guard and Navy announced that the airframe and black box had been found 15 nautical miles (28 km) southwest of Bach Long Vi, only 5 nm from the Vietnamese-Chinese border on the gulf.
9 February 2017
A Botswana Defence Force CASA C-212 crashed in the vicinity of Thebephatshwa village in the evening, minutes after leaving Thebephatshwa Air Base. All three people aboard died in the crash. The aircraft was on its way to the capital, Gaborone, 90 kilometres (56 mi) away.
29 July 2022
The second-in-command (SIC) of a CASA C-212 operating skydiving flights, with only the two pilots aboard, initiated a go-around at Raeford, North Carolina after what the pilot-in-command (PIC) described as a destabilized approach due to windshear. The aircraft made hard contact with the runway, which sheared off the right main landing gear, and returned to stable flight. After ground confirmation of the damage, the crew decided to divert to the larger Raleigh–Durham International Airport. En route to the alternate field with the PIC now flying, the PIC reported that the visibly upset SIC apologized for the hard landing, opened his own cockpit window and the rear cargo ramp, and got up from his seat stating that he needed to "get some air." He then proceeded to the rear of the aircraft and departed the aircraft via the open cargo ramp at 3,500 feet (1,100 m) without a parachute. The PIC told investigators that the SIC had "jumped"; however, the final NTSB report stated that there was not sufficient evidence to support he intentionally exited the aircraft. The body of the 23-year old SIC was found in a residential area later that evening. Toxicology indicated that the SIC had used a kratom product, possibly to treat anxiety, which can cause impairment as well as nausea, dizziness, or feelings of being hot or smothered. While the DEA has not listed kratom as a controlled substance, internal FAA policy considers its use disqualifying. Whether the SIC's kratom use contributed to the event was ruled inconclusive by the NTSB. The PIC executed an emergency landing at Raleigh–Durham, during which the aircraft departed the runway to the right, coming to rest in the grass. The aircraft was substantially damaged, but there was no explosion or fire. The PIC was uninjured.

== Specifications (Series 400) ==
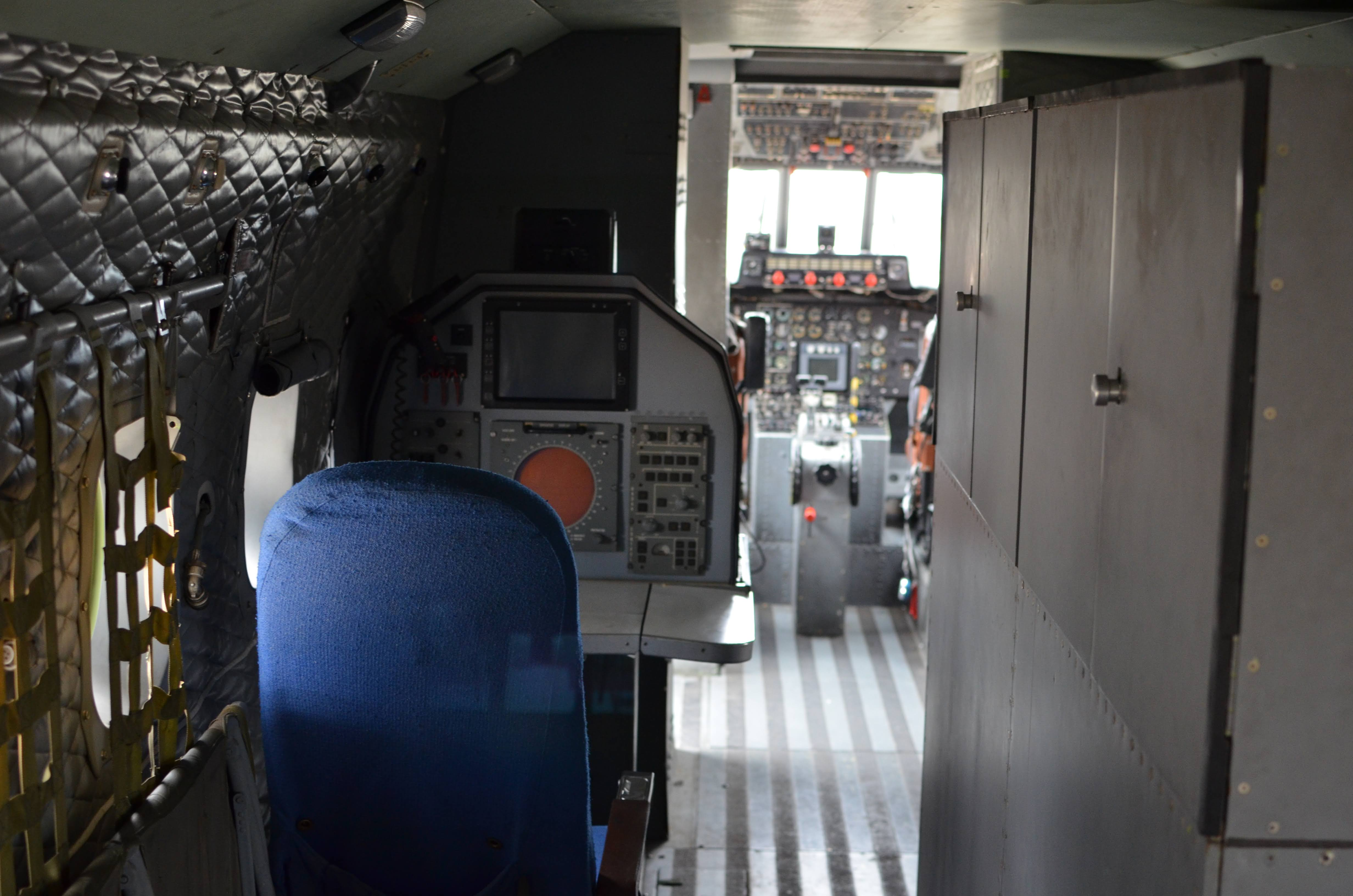
Radar operator's console in the cabin of a C-212

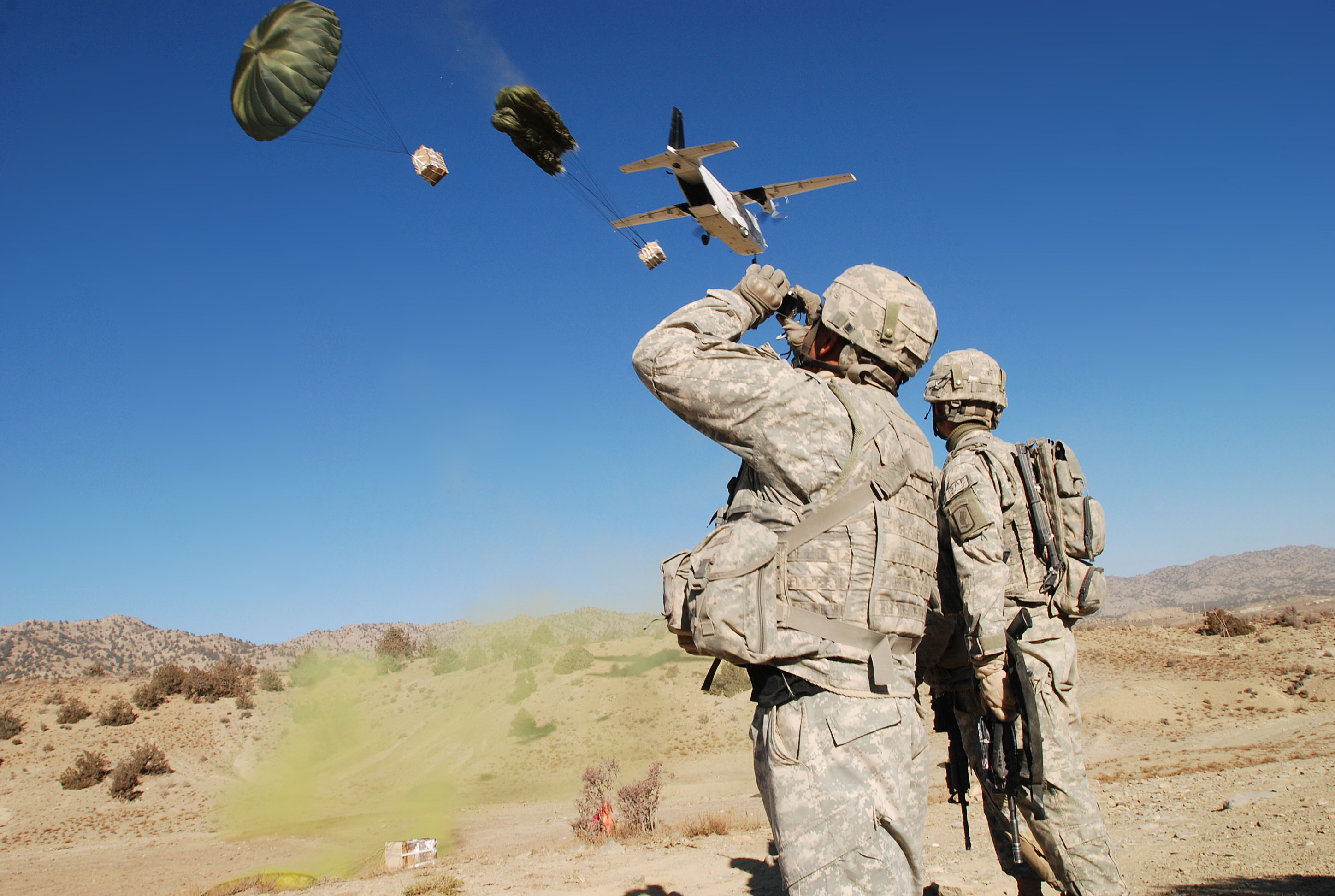
Blackwater Worldwide C-212 over Afghanistan

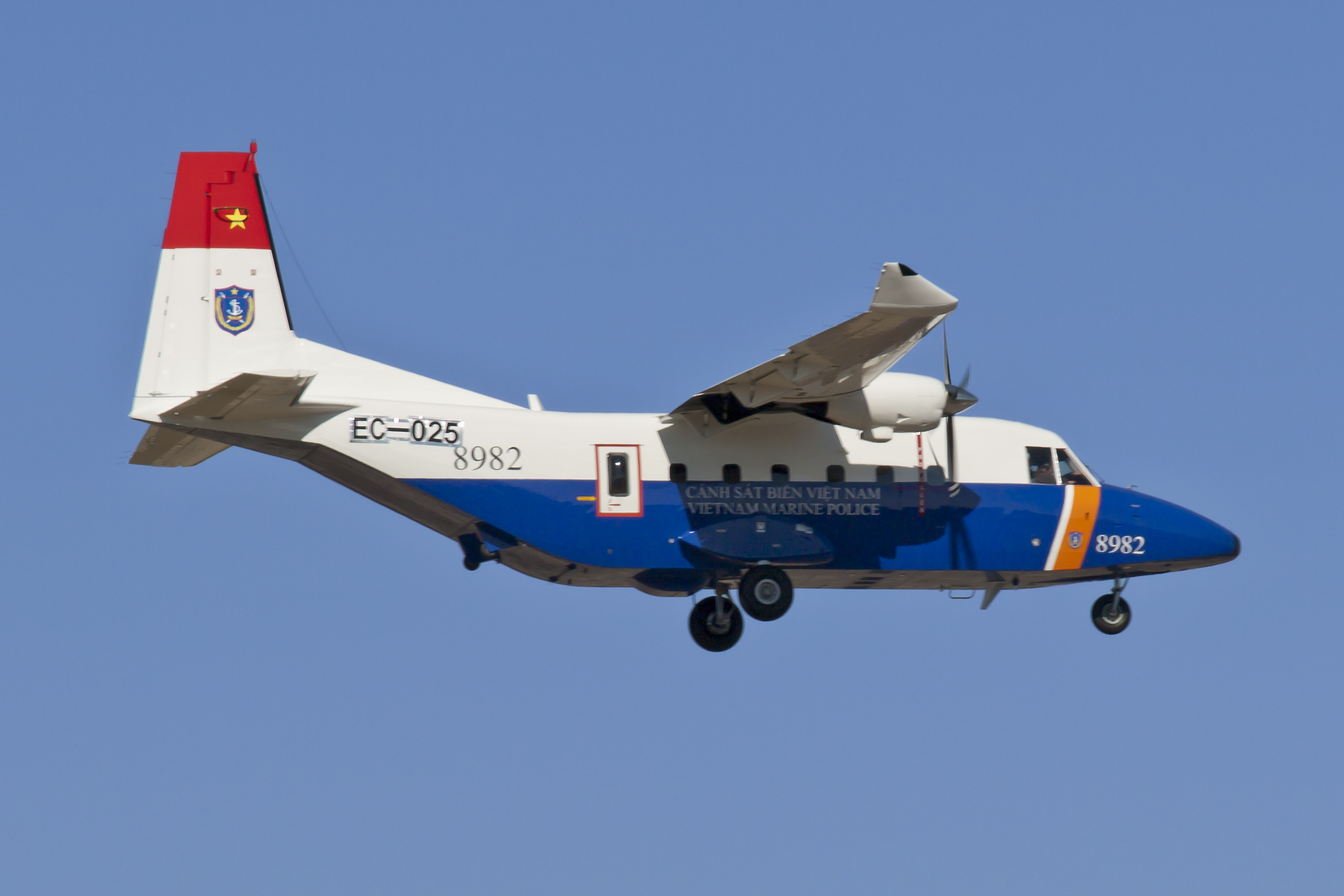
CASA C-212-400 of the Vietnam Coast Guard

Data from Jane's All The World's Aircraft 1989–90

General characteristics

- Crew: 2
- Capacity: 26 passengers / 25 paratroops / 2,820 kg (6,217 lb) military payload / 2,700 kg (5,952 lb) cargo payload
- Length: 16.15 m (53 ft 0 in)
- Wingspan: 20.28 m (66 ft 6 in)
- Height: 6.6 m (21 ft 8 in)
- Wing area: 41 m^{2} (440 sq ft)
- Aspect ratio: 10
- Airfoil: NACA 65_{3}-218
- Empty weight: 3,780 kg (8,333 lb)
- Max takeoff weight: 8,000 kg (17,637 lb) military 7,700 kg (16,976 lb) standard
- Fuel capacity: 2,040 L (540 US gal; 450 imp gal) / 1,600 kg (3,527 lb) internal and 1,000 L (260 US gal; 220 imp gal) auxiliary fuel tanks in the cabin or 2x 750 L (200 US gal; 160 imp gal) auxiliary fuel tanks in the cabin and/or 2x 500 L (130 US gal; 110 imp gal) underwing auxiliary fuel tanks
- Powerplant: 2 × Garrett AiResearch TPE331-10R-513C turboprop engines, 671 kW (900 hp) each
- Propellers: 4-bladed Dowty Rotol R-334/4-82-F/13, 2.74 m (9 ft 0 in) diameter constant-speed fully-feathering reversible-pitch propellers

Performance

- Maximum speed: 370 km/h (230 mph, 200 kn) V_{MO} (maximum operating speed) at MTOW
- Cruise speed: 354 km/h (220 mph, 191 kn) (max cruise) at 3,050 m (10,000 ft)
- Stall speed: 145 km/h (90 mph, 78 kn) in take-off configuration
- Range: 835 km (519 mi, 451 nmi) with full military payload
- Ferry range: 2,680 km (1,670 mi, 1,450 nmi) with maximum fuel and 1,192 kg (2,628 lb) payload
- Service ceiling: 7,925 m (26,000 ft) 3,380 m (11,100 ft) on one engine
- Rate of climb: 8.3 m/s (1,630 ft/min)
- Take-off distance to 15 m (49 ft): 610 m (2,000 ft) (MIL-7700C)
- Landing distance from 15 m (49 ft): 462 m (1,516 ft) (MIL-7700C)
- Landing run: 285 m (935 ft) (MIL-7700C)

Armament

- Up to 500 kg (1,102 lb) of weapons on two hardpoints. Typically, machine gun pods or rocket launchers.

FAA Data Sheet
Variant	-CB	-CC/CD/CE/CF/DF	-DE
Approved	22 Feb 1977	16 May 1980-30 Mar 1989	1 Oct 1991
2× Turboprop	Garrett TPE331-5	TPE331-10	P&WC PT6A-65B
Takeoff power	559 kW (750 hp)	671 kW (900 hp)	746 kW (1,000 hp)
Propellers	four-bladed variable pitch		
Manufacturer	Hartzell		McCauley
Propeller Diameter	273 cm (107.5 in)	279 cm (110 in)	269 cm (106 in)
Max. operating	200 kn (230 mph; 370 km/h) IAS		
Min. control	78 kn (90 mph; 144 km/h) IAS	85 kn (98 mph; 157 km/h) IAS (-CC/CD); 88 kn (101 mph; 163 km/h) IAS (-CE/CF); 76 kn (87 mph; 141 km/h) IAS (-DF)	76 kn (87 mph; 141 km/h) IAS
Chord	219.0 cm (86.22 in)		
MTOW	6,500 kg (14,332 lb)	7,700 kg (16,976 lb)	
Flight crew	Two pilots		
Max. passengers	19	28	
Usable fuel	2,000 L (528 US gal; 440 imp gal)		
Ceiling	7,600 m (25,000 ft)		

== See also ==
Related development

- Indonesian Aerospace N-219

Aircraft of comparable role, configuration, and era

- Antonov An-28
- Chase YC-122 Avitruc
- De Havilland Canada DHC-6 Twin Otter
- Dornier 228
- Harbin Y-12
- IAI Arava
- Short Skyvan

Related lists

- List of military aircraft of the United States
