= Indonesian Aerospace N219 =

Utility aircraft

N219
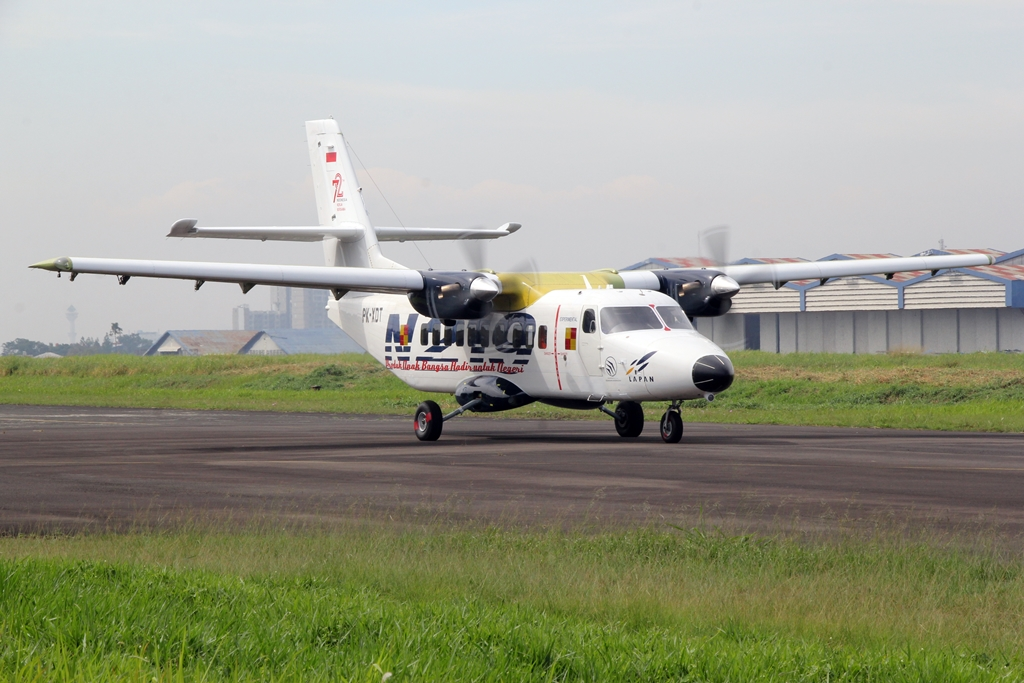
- N219 PD1 during landing, August 2017

General information
- Type: Utility aircraft
- National origin: Indonesia
- Manufacturer: Indonesian Aerospace
- Status: In production
- Number built: 2 prototypes (December 2024)

History
- Manufactured: 2017–present
- First flight: 16 August 2017

The Indonesian Aerospace N219 Nurtanio is a light STOL utility aircraft developed by Indonesian Aerospace.

Its maiden flight was in August 2017 and is Indonesian Aerospace's first domestically designed aircraft without foreign technical assistance.

== Development ==
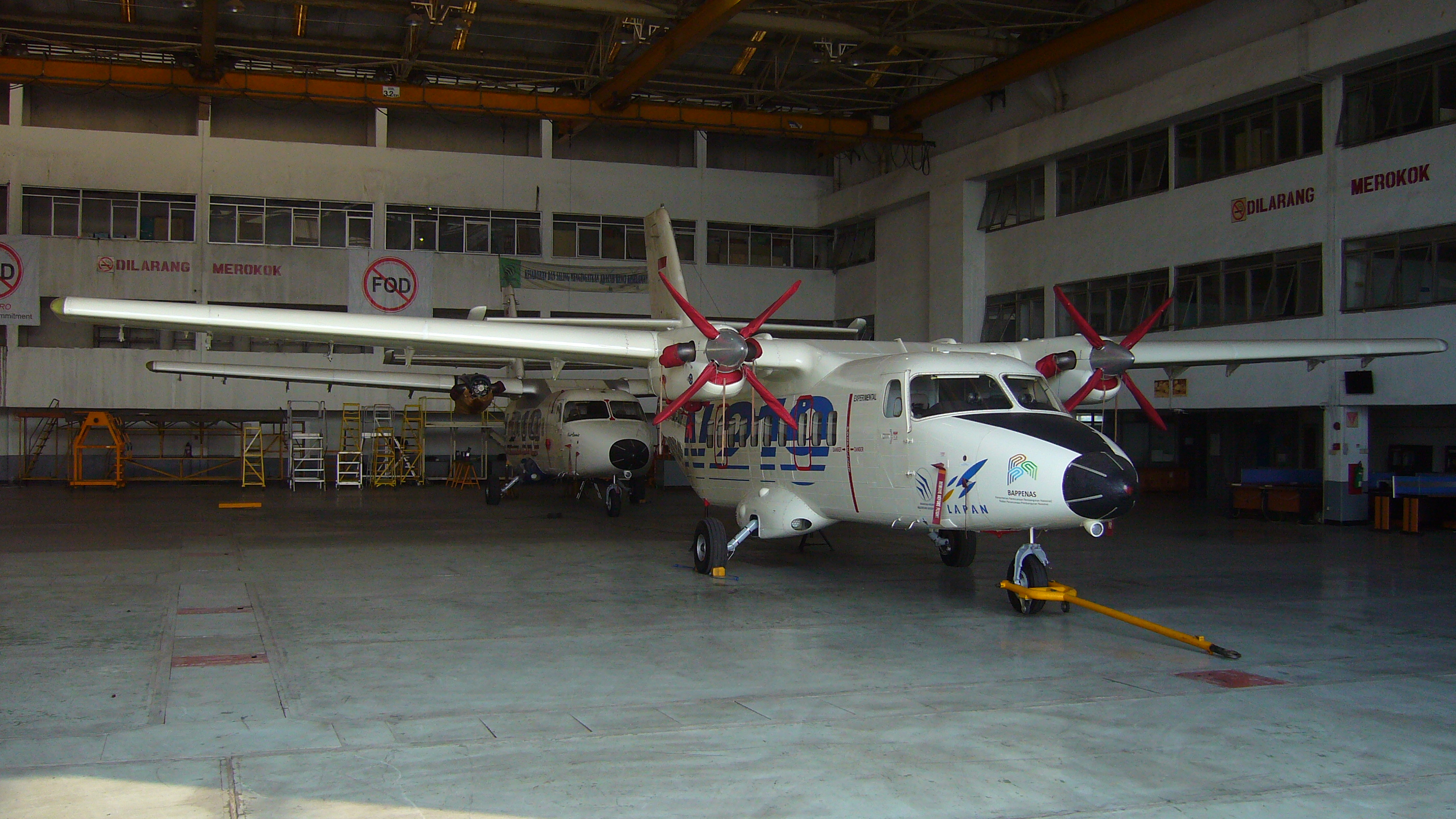
Two N219 prototypes inside a hangar.

In 2003, after the IPTN N250 program was terminated, Indonesian Aerospace (IAe) planned to develop a 19-seat utility/commuter aircraft to offset the IPTN NC212.

In early 2004, IAe was in discussions with Malaysian aerospace companies and was estimating the price of N219 development at US$60–80 million in order to fly a prototype in April 2006 and certify it in August 2007.

In 2006, the US$65 million funding for the 19 seat N219 development was proposed under the Qatar-Indonesia Joint Investment Fund, 70% funded by Qatar and 30% by Indonesia, for a prototype within two years.

By June 2011, its price was forecast to be US$4 million each and it was expected to fly in 2014. The Indonesian Industry Minister requested Rp59 billion to build the prototype.

In January 2012, the predicted development budget was about US$30 million for 15 aircraft.

In August 2014, the forecast price rose to US$5 million.

The first pieces of metal were cut for the plane in September 2014, before a planned roll-out in August 2015 and certification in 2016, before EASA certification with support from Airbus for export. First deliveries were scheduled for 2017.

The roll-out was then scheduled in November 2015.

In August 2016, Airbus was engaged to provide assistance with certification.

The prototype entered testing after the November 2015 public introduction. The first prototype construction was planned to be completed in mid-2016 for a maiden flight at the end of 2016, but this first flight was delayed to March 2017 for certification in the same year and production start in 2018. In February, it was delayed again to April.

After a series of high-speed taxiing runs on 11 August 2017 at Husein Sastranegara International Airport in Bandung, the prototype took off on 16 August 2017 for a 26-minute flight under the command of IAe Chief Test Pilot Ester Gayatri Saleh. At that time it was estimated that at least Rp 200 billion was needed to complete 200 hours of flight tests for certification from the Indonesian Transport Ministry.

Production was forecast in 2019 to start with six aircraft, increasing to 16 in 2020 and 36 per year in a new US$90–100 million facility raised through equity participation, private-public partnerships, manufacturing subsidiaries, and joint ventures.

The Indonesian Directorate General of Civil Aviation issued a type certificate on 18 December 2020.

On 8 December 2021, a memorandum of understanding was signed by the Indonesian Aerospace and PT Infoglobal Teknologi Semesta/Infoglobal to integrate maritime surveillance aircraft (MSA) mission systems into the N219. It will be based on a previous system that also installed on the Indonesian Navy's NC212 Maritime Patrol aircraft.

CEO of Indonesian Aerospace Gita Amperiawan stated in September 2024 that the N219 has entered serial production, slated for the Indonesian Army. The company aimed to complete the Indonesian Defence Airworthiness Authority (IDAA) type certification for the N219 in 2027 and deliver the first aircraft at the same time. The military variant has sliding door for medical evacuation, logistics and troop transport.

Indonesian Aerospace and Scytalys, a Greek company, signed a framework agreement on 21 November 2025 to develop the N219 MSA (Maritime Surveillance Aircraft) variant for the Indonesian Maritime Security Agency (Bakamla). IAe would act as the main contractor and responsible for aircraft configuration, while Scytalys would provide and integrate Scytalys' MIMS Airborne Mission System to the aircraft. The variant is planned to be equipped with surveillance radar with range up to 160 nautical miles (300 km; 180 mi) and electro-optical/infrared sensor with detection range of 20 kilometres (12 mi). The N219 MSA would have operational range of up to 200 nautical miles (370 km; 230 mi) and more than five hours of endurance. The N219 MSA development is planned to enter into contract at the end of 2026.

Later in March 2nd 2026 local time an official video of the aircraft PK-XDP and PK-XDT conducting flight tests including nighttime flight, one engine inoperative test flight, and accelerated stall test was shared.

== Design ==
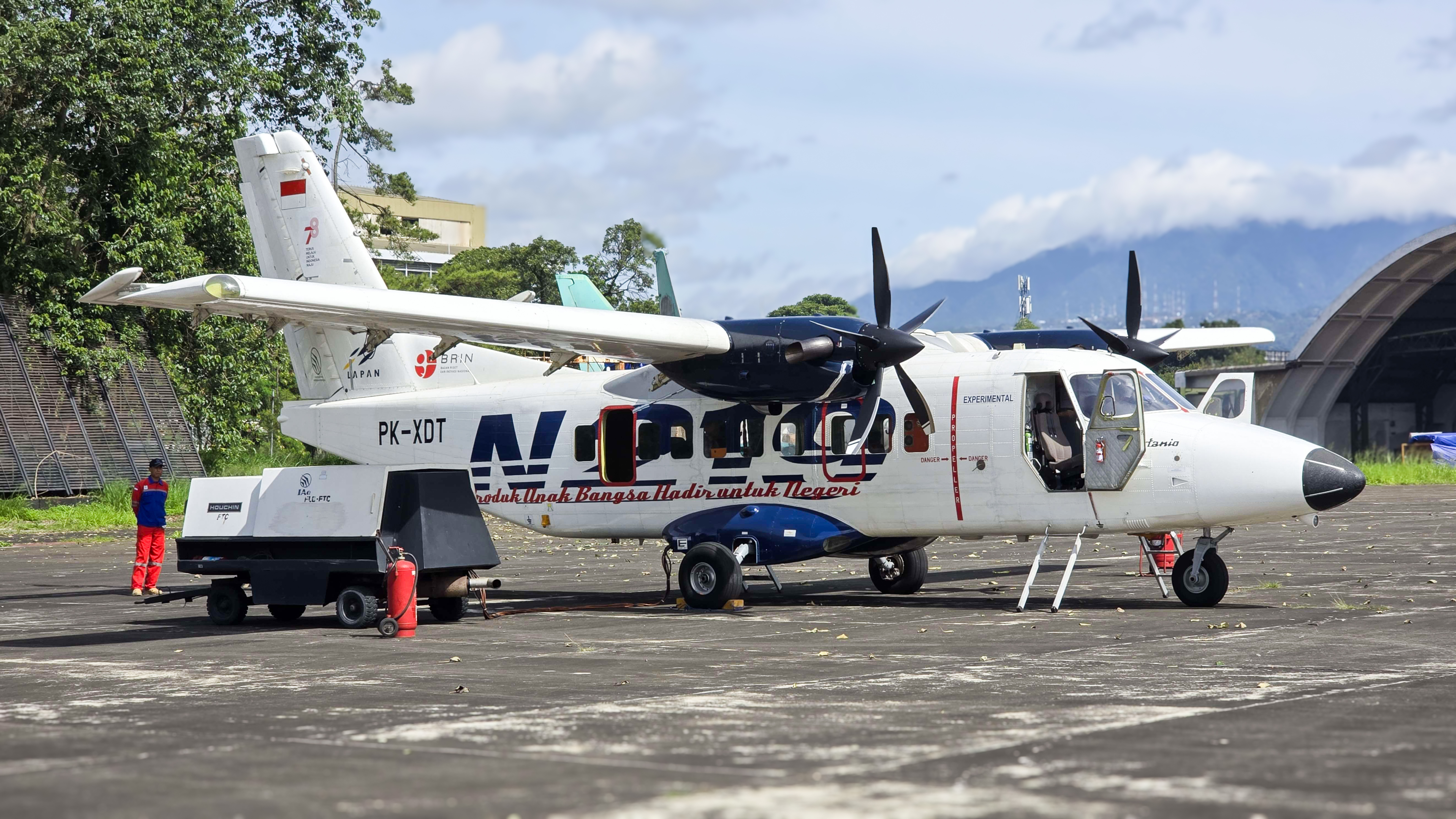
N219 PD1 with 5-bladed MTV-27 propellers at Husein Sastranegara Airport.

The N219 is twin-engine, 19-seater transport aircraft designed for multi-purpose missions in remote areas. It is intended to operate in and out of remote, semi-prepared airstrips; suitable to conditions in Indonesia's archipelago.

The experience of building licensed CASA C-212 Aviocar has aided the Indonesian Aerospace on designing the N219, and like that design, is also of all metal construction. It is claimed that it will have the largest cabin volume in its class (6.50 x 1.82 x 1.70m) and a flexible door system to allow multi-purpose missions for transporting passengers and cargo. The aircraft is designed to comply with FAR 23 (normal and commuter category aircraft).

Priced at US$5.8-6 million, slightly lower than the Twin Otter, the 170 kn (310 km/h) cruise aircraft is intended for cargo and passenger transport, troop transport, military surveillance, search and rescue, and medevac operations, with a possible amphibian version later. Sixty percent of the materials are domestically produced and local suppliers produce landing gear parts, rubber components and tooling.

== Orders ==
In August 2013, Lion Air was to sign a memorandum of understanding for US$1004.5-5 million N219s. The total market for the N219 was forecast as 97 civil and 57 military aircraft.

On 13 April 2015, three memoranda of understanding were signed: with Nusantara Buana Air for 20 aircraft and ten options, with Aviastar Mandiri for 20 aircraft and ten options and with Trigana Air Service for ten aircraft and five options.

Indonesia has signed deals with China and Mexico to export N219 to those countries.

In 2017 southeast Asian countries such as Thailand and Myanmar expressed interest in the aircraft.

By October 2018, domestic airline Avistar signed a memorandum of understanding for 20 more while the N219 had 120 orders and was due to be certified in April or May 2019.

Other customers include Lion Air, Trigana Air Service, Nusantara Buana Air, Pelita Air, Air Born and the government of Thailand.

On 9 December 2019, the government of Aceh signed a cooperation agreement or memorandum of understanding for the procurement of N219 aircraft, crew training and the operation of Aceh's air transport service.

On 3 November 2022, Indonesian company PT Karya Logistik Indotama (PT KLI) ordered 11 N219s configured for passenger transport, for US$80.5 million. The first aircraft are scheduled for delivery 28 months after the contract's entry into force.

The Ministry of Defense of Indonesia ordered six N219s, including one N219 Amphibian, for the Indonesian Army. Janes reported that the contract was signed in November 2023 and valued at US$68 million. It is the first military contract of the N219. N219 for the Indonesian Army has entered production by September 2024, with the planned delivery in 2027.

Setdco Group, on behalf of the Democratic Republic of the Congo government, ordered five N219s on 3 September 2024 in a US$66.2 million contract.

During the Indo Defence 2024 held in mid-June 2025, several provincial governments signed memorandum of understanding for N219 Amphibian procurement. The Indonesian Maritime Security Agency (Bakamla) also signed a letter of intent for N219 procurement. In October 2025, Bakamla submitted a proposal to the Ministry of National Development Planning for the procurement of four N219 MSA and its supporting equipment, personnel training, spare parts, and aftersales support for five years.

PT BIBU Panji Sakti signed a memorandum of understanding on 9 December for three N219-100 in cargo configuration.

On 5 May 2026, PT Mitra Aviasi Perkasa (PT MAP) signed a contract for four N219s in cargo configuration. It is the first sale contract for the N219 in the domestic market.

== Operators ==
=== Military operators ===
Indonesia

- Indonesian Army: 5 N219-100 basic military transport and 1 N219-100A Amphibian on order, delivery in 2027.

=== Government operators ===
Indonesia

- Indonesian Maritime Security Agency: 4 N219-100 Maritime Surveillance Aircraft on order.

=== Civilian operators ===
Indonesia

- PT Mitra Aviasi Perkasa: 4 N219 cargo aircraft on order.

== Variants ==
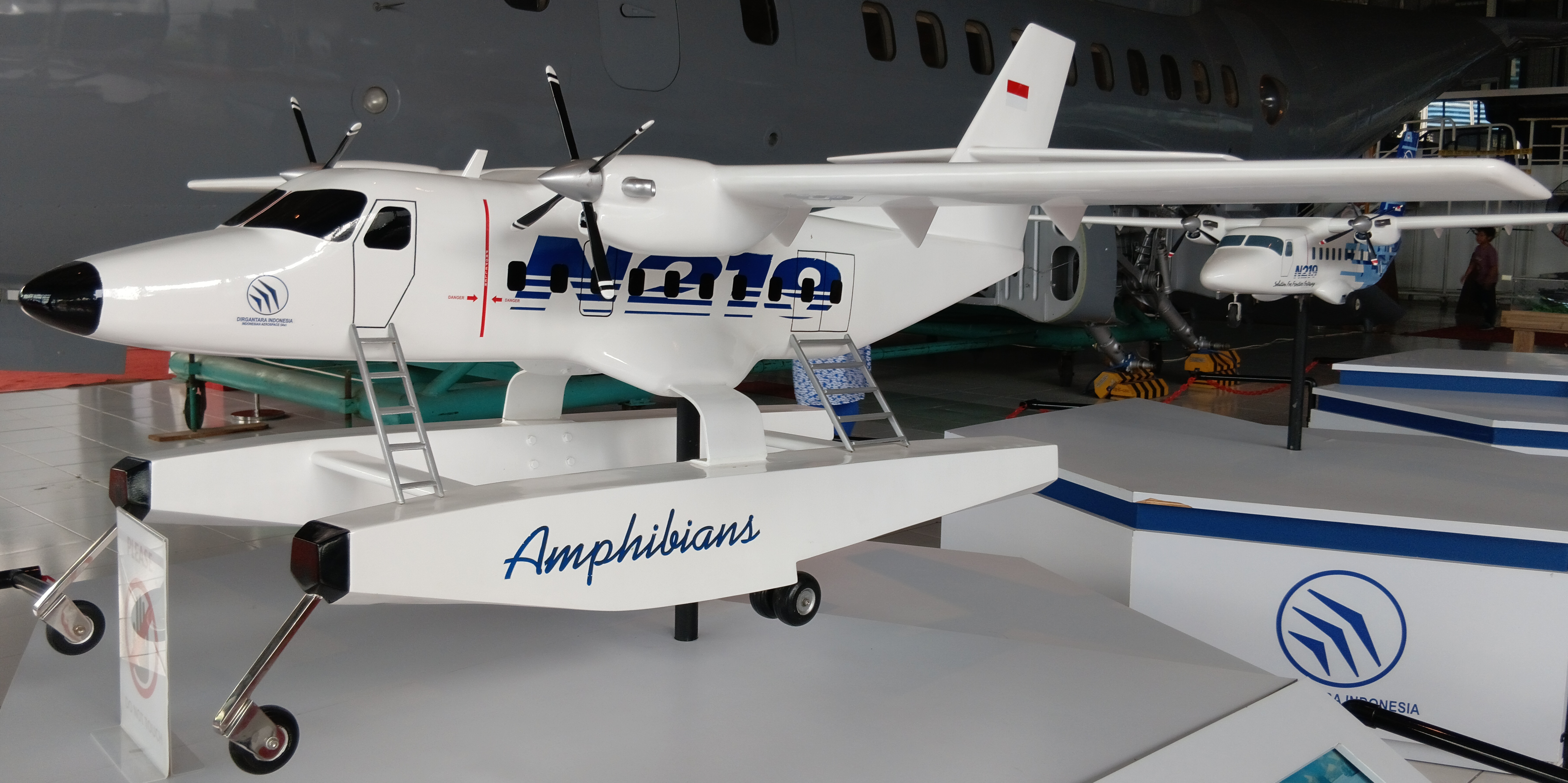
Model of N219 Amphibian variant.

N219
Initial two prototypes, designated as Prototype Design 1 (PD1) and Prototype Design 2 (PD2), which are registered as PK-XDT and PK-XDP respectively. Both PD1 and PD2 are equipped with Garmin G1000NXi avionics suite. PD1 is fitted with five-bladed Carbon-Fiber Reinforced Polymer (CFRP) MTV-27 propellers whilst PD2 is rigged out with four-bladed aluminum Hartzell propellers. PD2 is configured with a 19-seat cabin and interior.

N219-100
Serial production variant equipped with Garmin G1000NXi or Genesys Avionics Suite options. The variant also has optimized control surface areas and aerostructures.

N219-100A
Amphibious variant of the N219-100 equipped with floats.

== Specifications ==
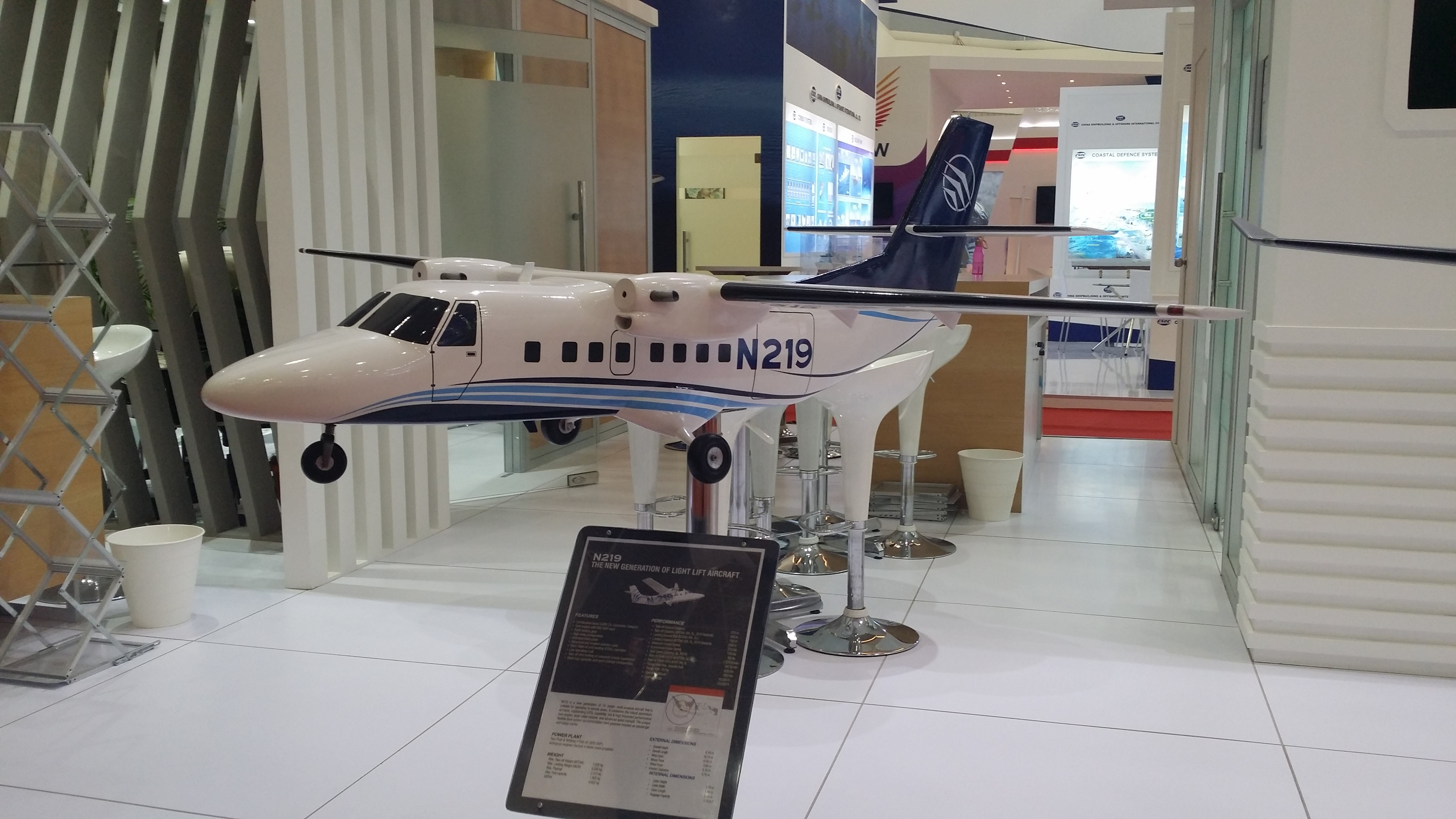
Model of Indonesian Aerospace N219.

Data from Manufacturer

General characteristics

- Crew: 2
- Capacity: 19 passengers
- Length: 16.49 m (54 ft 1 in)
- Wingspan: 19.5 m (64 ft 0 in)
- Height: 6.18 m (20 ft 3 in)
- Wing area: 41.5 m^{2} (447 sq ft)
- Empty weight: 4,309 kg (9,500 lb)
- Max takeoff weight: 7,030 kg (15,498 lb)
- Fuel capacity: 1,600 kg
- Powerplant: 2 × Pratt & Whitney Canada PT6A-42 turboprop engines, 630 kW (850 shp) each
- Propellers: 4-bladed Hartzell Propeller aluminum autofeathering or 5-bladed MT-Propeller CFRP autofeathering

Performance

- Maximum speed: 390 km/h (240 mph, 210 kn)
- Cruise speed: 310 km/h (200 mph, 170 kn) Economical
- Stall speed: 109 km/h (68 mph, 59 kn)
- Range: 890 km (550 mi, 480 nmi) with 19 pax
- Ferry range: 1,533 km (953 mi, 828 nmi)
- Service ceiling: 3,700 m (12,000 ft) maximum operating altitude, service ceiling of 24,000 feet (7,315 m)
- g limits: -1.2 g to +3.0 g (flaps retracted)
- Rate of climb: 9.85 m/s (1,938 ft/min)
- Takeoff distance: 435 meters (1,427 feet)
- Landing distance: 509 meters (1,670 feet)

Avionics

- Garmin G1000NXi or Genesys Avionics Suite

== See also ==
Related development

- CASA C-212 Aviocar

Aircraft of comparable role, configuration, and era

- Cessna 408 SkyCourier
- Desaer ATL-100
- DHC-6-400 Twin Otter
- Dornier 228NG
- Harbin Y-12F
- Aircraft Industries L 410 NG
- PZL M28 Skytruck
