= Nusantara Buana Air =

Airline of Indonesia

NBA - Nusantara Buana Air
IATA	ICAO	Call sign
—	NBA	—
- Founded: 2008
- Ceased operations: 2011
- Hubs: Polonia International Airport, Medan; Banda Aceh Airport, Aceh
- Fleet size: 5
- Destinations: 12 pioneer routes in Aceh, North Sumatra, West Sumatra, Bengkulu Province, and Maluku
- Headquarters: Medan, North Sumatra

Nusantara Buana Air was an Indonesian airline serving destinations in Aceh from its hubs at Medan Polonia Airport and Banda Aceh Airport. Nusantara Buana Air is listed in category 2 by Indonesian Civil Aviation Authority for airline safety quality.

It competes with Sabang Merauke Raya Air Charter for government-charters scheduled services to towns and cities within Aceh, taking over from SMAC for 2009 after SMAC operated the routes in 2008. As of January 2010, there are no scheduled flights.

Previous routes were operated from both Medan and Banda Aceh to Blangpidie, Kutacane, Meulaboh, Simeulue, Singkil, Takengon and Tapaktuan, as well as to Pulau Nias via Padang, using a single Indonesian Aerospace NC-212-200.

Following the accident in September 2011, the transportation ministry has suspended the Air Operator Certificate (AOC) of the airline for safety reasons due to the ministry found several serious shortcomings, such as aircraft performance, maintenance, and fuel and pilot policy. The ministry has also announced that any newer aircraft acquired have to use the latest generation of Ground proximity warning system (GPWS).

== Fleet ==
As of February 2012 the Nusantara Buana Air fleet includes the following aircraft:

Nusantara Buana Air Fleet
Aircraft	In Fleet	Order	Seats			Notes
Aircraft	In Fleet	Order	C	Y	Total	Notes
CASA 212-200	5	0			21	
British Aerospace Jetstream 41	0	4	0	29	29	
Dornier 228	0	4	0	18	18	
Indonesian Aerospace N-219	0	30	0	19	19	Contract signed in February 2012
Total	5	38				

== Incidents and accidents ==
On September 29, 2011, Flight 823, a CASA C-212 aircraft, registered PK-TLF and built in 1989, carrying 18 people (14 passengers, 4 crew and the pilot) on a flight between Medan, North Sumatra and Kutacane, Aceh crashed in the vicinity of Bukit Lawang in Bohorok district. The accident occurred between 07.28 and 08.05 local time about 36 miles northwest of Medan, North Sumatra. The wreckage of the plane was found on 3 October, containing the bodies of all eighteen people on board.
