= Skytraders =

Australian airline

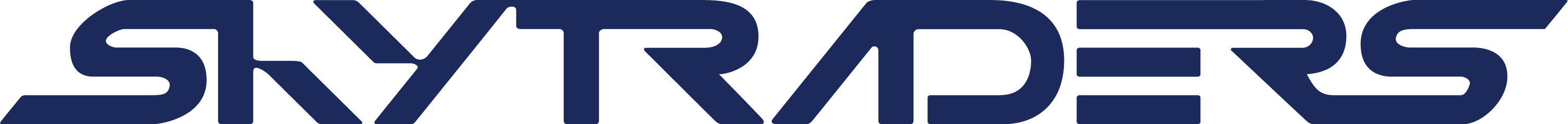
IATA	ICAO	Call sign
—	SND	SNOWBIRD
- Founded: 1979
- Hubs: Melbourne Airport
- Fleet size: 7
- Headquarters: 180 Jersey Road, Woollahra, New South Wales, Australia
- Key people: Norman F Mackay (CEO)
- Website: www.skytraders.com.au

Skytraders is an Australian airline, headquartered at 180 Jersey Road, Woollahra, New South Wales, Australia. Skytraders was founded in 1979. It is the provider of specialist air services to the Australian Federal Government.

== History ==
=== 1979–1993 ===
Commencing in 1979, Skytraders was contracted for the weekly movement of 40 tonne DC8 loads of chilled lamb and produce to Riyadh in Saudi Arabia. With the introduction of 747 freighters, Skytraders pioneered the movement of live cattle by air from Australia. They also developed the 'Skybox', which allows for the transport of fresh carcass beef from abattoirs to end users in Japan without the need for refrigeration. This technology largely attributed to Australia becoming the largest supplier of high-end fresh chilled beef to the Japanese market. By 1990, Skytraders itself had become Australia's largest shipper of export airfreight and was awarded the Austrade Gold Medal by the Australian Federal Government.

=== 1993–2002 ===
In a joint-venture with Qantas and DHL, in 1993 Skytraders commenced a nightly express service between Sydney and Auckland that utilised a Boeing 727-100 freighter. The program addressed the need for moving large numbers of thoroughbred bloodstock at the same time as meeting the international express operator's requirement for trans-Tasman close of business pick up and next morning delivery.

=== 2002–present ===
In 2002, Skytraders was awarded a long-term contract by the Australian Antarctic Division for the provision of a range of Antarctic air services. Since then, the company's role in providing air services to the Commonwealth Government has grown to also include long-term contracts with the Department of Defence (Special Operations Command), the Department of Home Affairs (Australian Border Force), Victorian State Government (Victoria Police), the Department of Foreign Affairs & Trade, Australian Federal Police, and the Australian Maritime Safety Authority. In January 2024, Skytraders started operating regular flights on behalf of Australian based mining services company, Mineral Resources Limited.

== Services ==
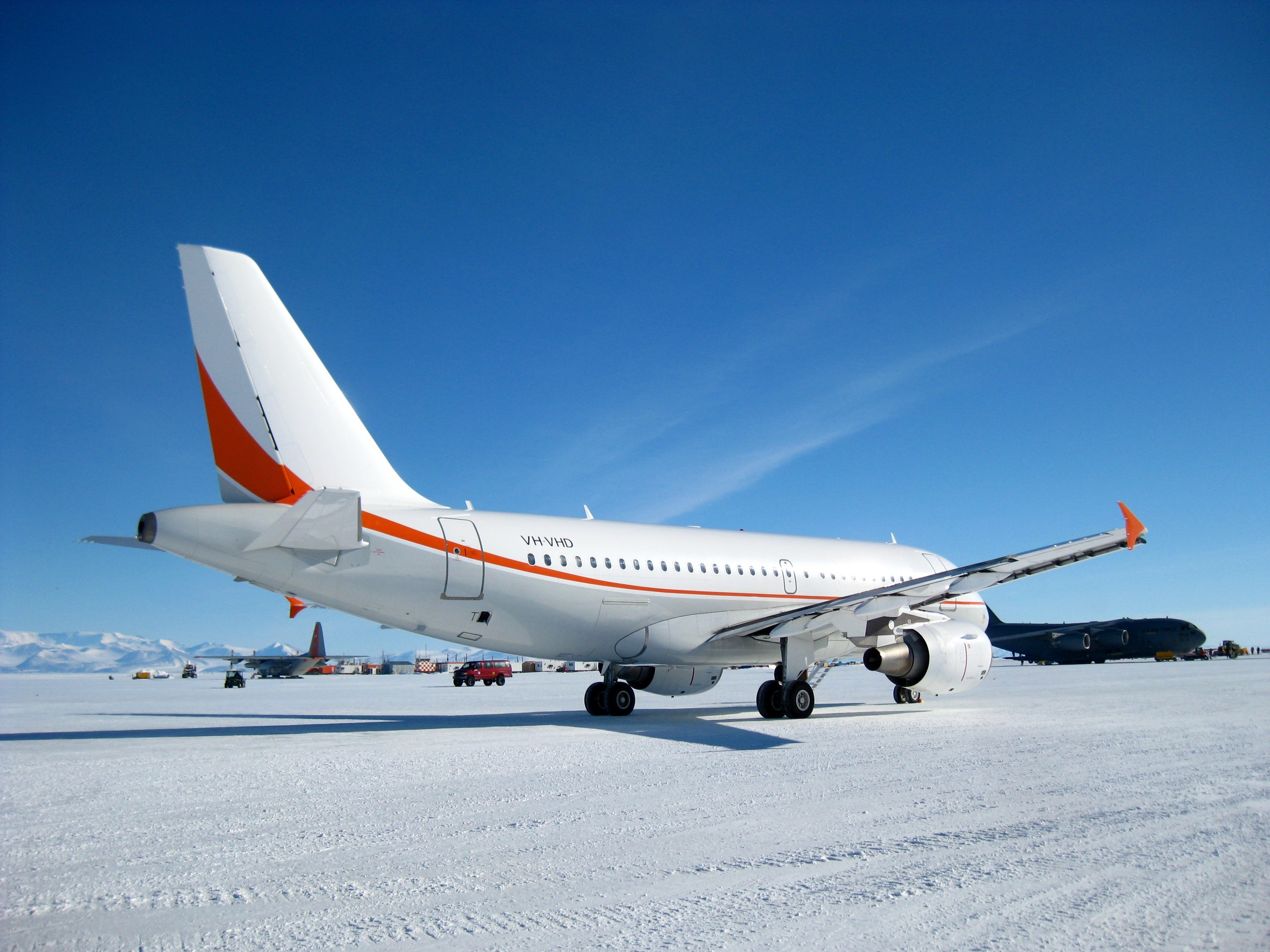
Skytraders Airbus A319-115, VH-VHD on the Ice Runway at McMurdo Station, Antarctica (2010)

According to the Skytraders website, Skytraders have six key service areas including Cold Climate, Surveillance & Survey, Special Missions, Defence, Medevac & Aeromedical, and Executive Transport & Charter. Skytraders operates flights to support the Australian Antarctic Division's scientific research programme in Antarctica, achieving a number of milestones including the first landing by an Airbus on a sea-ice runway, the introduction of the first civilian airline operation to-and-from Eastern Antarctica, and the earliest ever winter medical evacuation from Eastern Antarctica. Skytraders' website also states the company offers charter services to executives and VIPs during the Northern Hemisphere summer.

Under a government contract with the Department of Home Affairs, Skytraders' Airbus A319 fleet have undertaken transfer flights of immigration detainees and asylum seekers across the Australian mainland and offshore locations including Christmas Island and Nauru. In 2012, Skytraders made a request to the global flight tracking organisation, FlightAware, that its detainee and asylum-seeker transportation flights not be tracked publicly.

=== Cold climate ===
In 2002, Skytraders was chosen out of seven tenders to be the official air link to Antarctica. Their advanced safety systems won them the tender. They operate an Airbus Corporate Jet between Hobart and Casey Station. The service aims to provide 25 flights each summer, with the first flights launching in the summer of 2003–2004. For over 20 years, Skytraders has been the primary provider of air services to the Australian Antarctic Division. Over this time, in conjunction with Government, Skytraders has developed techniques and experience, combined with robust safety systems, that redefine excellence in the provision of air transport services in Antarctica.

=== Government services ===
In 2000, Skytraders responded to an Australian Commonwealth Government 'Call for Registration of Interest' for the design and construction of an Air Transport System for Antarctica. This was followed by a formal 'Request for Proposal' that resulted in Skytraders being awarded a contract for the provision of a range of Antarctic air services under a long-term agreement.

In 2002, the Australian Government selected Skytraders to provide an Intercontinental Airlink from Australia to Antarctica for the Australian Antarctic Division (AAD). Scientists, support staff and cargo are flown in an Airbus A319 jet aircraft from Hobart to Wilkins Runway, near Casey Station. This continent-to-continent service takes approximately 4.5 hours.

The Airbus A319 operates to and from the purpose-built Wilkins Runway - a 4,000-metre long snow capped blue-ice runway in the Upper Petersen Glacier located 70 km from Casey Station. The Airlink operates between Hobart and Antarctica between mid-October to mid-March. This air link has increased the capability and flexibility of AAD's logistics system and provides access and opportunity for its science programs. The aircraft's configuration can be modified from passenger to "combi" (passenger and freighter) according to requirements.

The long range of the A319 gives it the capability for remote maritime work, and when not on Antarctic service, it is available for general air charter operations. It is also able to easily complete the Hobart - Casey return trip without refuelling; this was an integral part of Skytraders' proposal for the Airlink. Eliminating the requirement for both the construction of an alternate runway site in Antarctica and any on site refueling has significant economic and environmental benefits.

In 2018, Skytraders was also awarded a long-term contract to provide high-endurance surveillance services to the State of Victoria, with operations beginning in 2020. The Company also has a long history of supporting the Australian Maritime Safety Authority.

Since 2013, Skytraders has provided air services for the Special Operations Command's Australian Defence Force Parachuting School with two C212-400s, specially modified for a military paratrooper configuration requiring static line and free-fall operations up to 25,000 feet.

In 2010 Skytraders was awarded a government contract to provide specialist air services to the Department of Home Affairs. As part of border management and enforcement, the Department of Home Affairs contracts commercial and charter airlines to carry out voluntary and involuntary transfers, removals and deportations of 'persons in custody' (PIC) under the Migration Act, including refugees and asylum seekers. In December 2015, 1News reported that Skytraders had been operating deportation flights from Australia to New Zealand. The New Zealand Ministry of Transport had criticised Skytraders for an unscheduled flight which arrived in Auckland on 19 November.

== Fleet ==
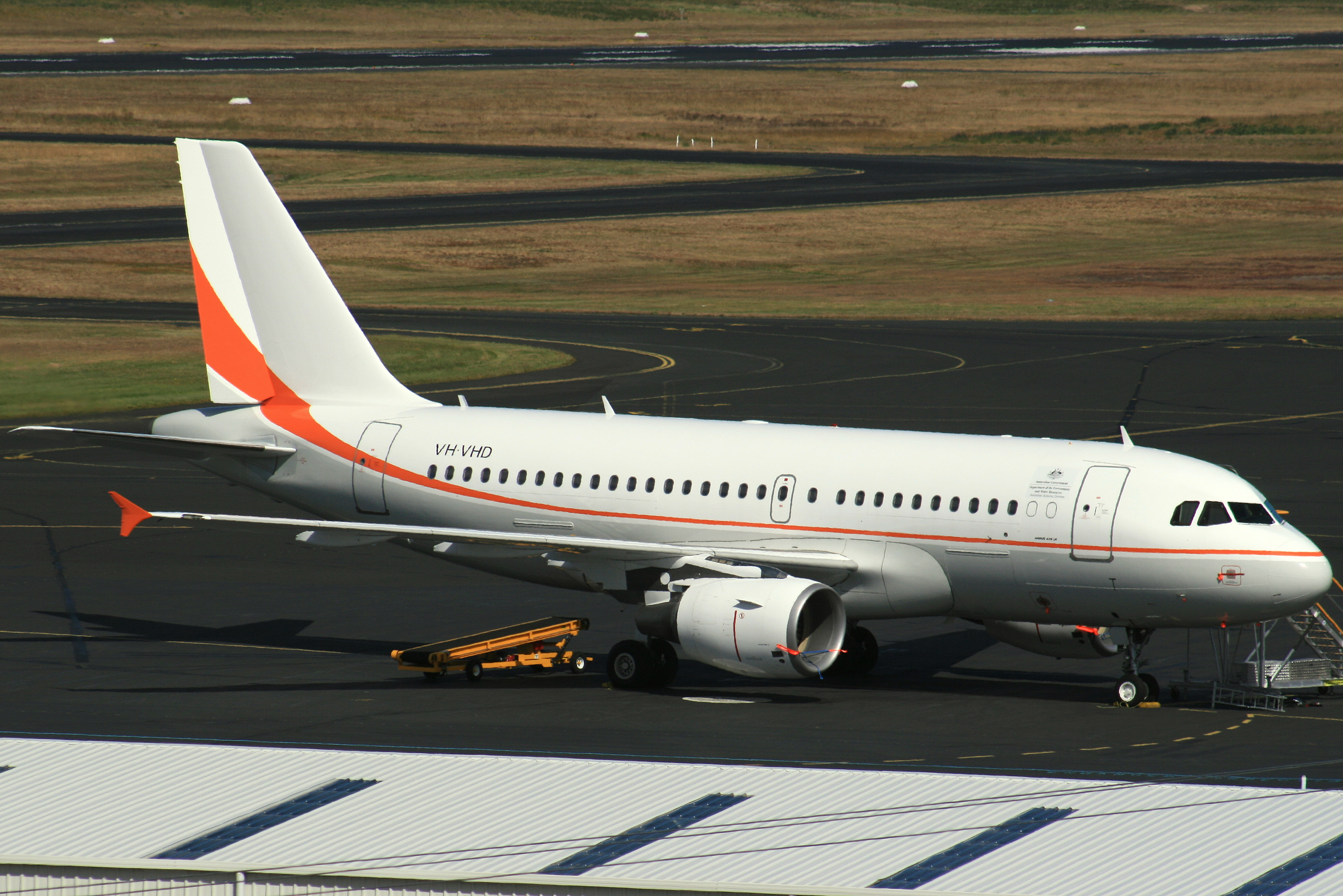
Skytraders Airbus A319LR at Hobart

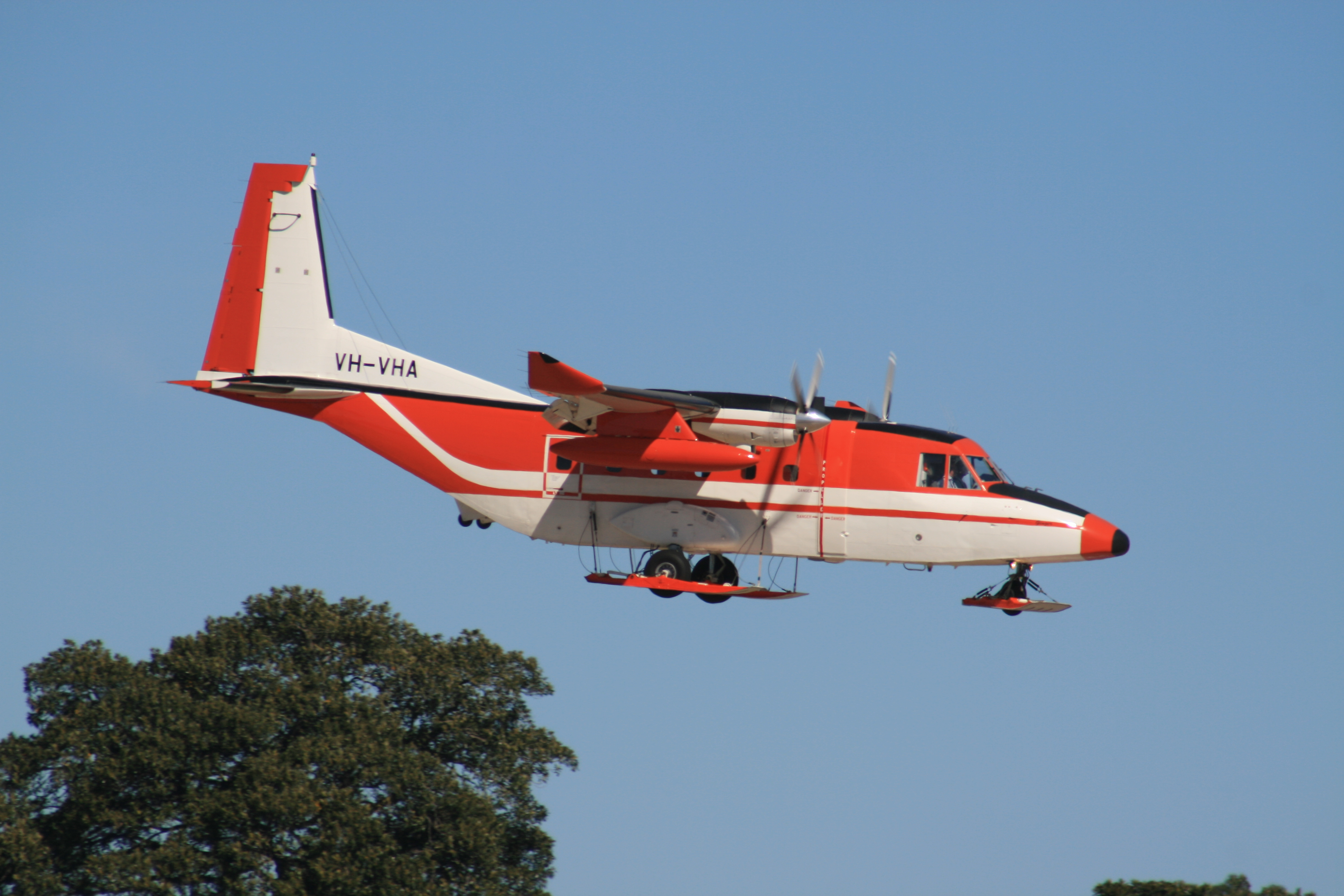
Skytraders ski-equipped CASA 212-400

As of December 2025, Skytraders operates the following aircraft:

- 1 A320
- 3 Airbus A319
- 2 CASA 212-400
- 1 Beechcraft King Air 350ER

== Incidents ==
- On 9 May 2010, an incident involving a Skytraders aircraft sparked an enquiry by the Australian Transport Safety Bureau (ATSB). A Skytraders Airbus A319, registered VH-VHD, taxied to the runway in the Cocos (Keeling) Islands for a flight to Christmas Island with the aircraft's integral staircase still extended as it began to move across the tarmac. When the crew realised what had happened, they stopped the aircraft and retracted the staircase. Skytraders gave an undertaking to the ATSB to revise its operational procedures as a result of this incident.
- On 15 May 2015, a serious incident involving Skytraders Airbus A319, registered VH-VCJ sparked an ATSB enquiry when the aircraft positioned to commence an instrument approach and landing at Melbourne and descended approximately 800 feet below minimum altitude, following a series of pilot errors. During the descent below 3,000 ft, the aircraft's Terrain Avoidance and Warning System (TAWS) initiated a number of warning alerts, the speed limit for the aircraft flaps was exceeded, and the Minimum Safe Altitude Warning System (MSAW) initiated an alert to the ATC controller.

== Notable flights ==
- On 31 July 2026, a Skytraders Airbus A319 Long Range aircraft, operating with the call sign Snowbird 1, flew from Hobart to Phoenix Airfield near McMurdo Station, Antarctica, in response to an urgent request to evacuate an American requiring medical treatment. The aircraft landed after a five-and-a-half-hour flight in darkness and temperatures as low as −43 °C (−45 °F). The patient was subsequently flown to Christchurch, New Zealand, where the person was admitted to hospital in serious condition. The mission was described as a rare midwinter Antarctic rescue.

== See also ==
- List of airlines of Australia
