= Alas Leuser Airport =

Airport in Kutacane City, Indonesia

- IATA: LSR; ICAO: WIMU

Summary
- Airport type: Public, military
- Owner: Government of Indonesia
- Serves: Kutacane
- Location: Kutacane, Southeast Aceh Regency, Aceh, Indonesia
- Time zone: WIB (UTC+07:00)
- Elevation AMSL: 13 ft / 4 m
- Coordinates: 3.392°N 97.864°E

Map
- Location in Aceh, Northern Sumatra, Sumatra and Indonesia Alas Leuser Airport (Northern Sumatra) Alas Leuser Airport (Sumatra) Alas Leuser Airport (Indonesia)

Runways
Direction	Length		Surface
Direction	ft	m	Surface
15/33	4,900	1,500	Asphalt

Alas Leuser Airport is an airport located near Kutacane in Aceh, Indonesia.

== Airlines and destinations ==
Airlines	Destinations
Susi Air	Banda Aceh
