= Air Born Indonesia =

Airline of Indonesia

Air Born Indonesia logo

Air Born Indonesia is a national private air charter company established on December 9, 2010. Air Born is currently based in Sultan Aji Muhammad Sulaiman Airport, Balikpapan, East Kalimantan.

Air Born specializes in remote air transport operations for mining, oil and gas companies in transporting their executives, employees and contractors, emergency medical evacuation and critical spare parts.

== Fleet ==
=== Current fleet ===
The Air Born Indonesia fleet includes the following aircraft as of August 2019:

Air Born Indonesia fleet
Aircraft	In service	Orders	Passengers	Notes
De Havilland Canada DHC-6-400 Twin Otter	1	—		
Total	1	—		

=== Former fleet ===
The airline previously operated the following aircraft (at August 2018):

- 2 De Havilland Canada DHC-6-300 Twin Otter
