= Jet Express =

Airline of Gabon

IATA	ICAO	Call sign
G2	VXG	AVIREX-GABON
- Founded: 1989 (as Avirex Gabon)
- Hubs: Libreville International Airport
- Fleet size: 3
- Headquarters: Tortola, British Virgin Islands

Jet Express was an airline based in Libreville, Gabon. It operated a domestic schedule linking the major towns of Gabon with regional services to neighbouring countries in West Africa. Its main base was Libreville International Airport and in 2007 became O. R. Tambo International Airport. Its head office when in business was located in Tortola.

According to the website ch-aviation the company is out of business.

== History ==
The airline was established in 1989 as Avirex Gabon and is owned by Philippe Salles (98%), its President and CEO. In 2007, the airline was renamed "Jet Express" operated mostly charters and wet and dry leases aircraft to airlines from Johannesburg.

== Destinations ==
Jet Express operates the following services (in March 2008):

- Domestic scheduled destinations: Libreville and Port-Gentil.

== Fleet ==
The Jet Express fleet consists of the following aircraft (as of 15 November 2009) :

- 2 Boeing 737-200
- 1 McDonnell Douglas MD-87
