= Kutacane =

Coordinates: 3.5°N 97.8°E

- Town and Regency seat
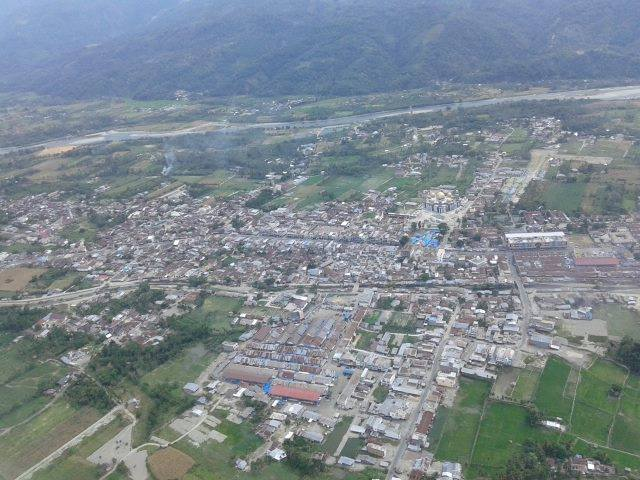
- Interactive map of Kutacane
- Country: Indonesia
- Province: Aceh
- Regency: Southeast Aceh
- Time zone: UTC+7 (WIB)

Kutacane is a town in Aceh province of Indonesia and the seat (capital) of Southeast Aceh Regency, Indonesia. Kutacane lies in a valley within the Bukit Barisan mountain range of northern Sumatra, with an average elevation of around 270 meters above sea level. The town serves as the upstream area of the Singkil basin (DAS Singkil), making it an important hydrological and ecological zone. Surrounded by steep hills and tropical forests, Kutacane’s topography reflects the geologically active spine of western Indonesia, and it plays a key role in regional watershed dynamics and land use planning. It is also widely recognized as the main gateway to Gunung Leuser National Park, one of Southeast Asia’s most biodiverse conservation areas, offering access to jungle trekking routes, wildlife observation, and ecotourism activities centered around the Ketambe region.

Susi Air and NBA flies to Kutacane Airport from Medan and Banda Aceh.

== Climate ==
Kutacane has a tropical rainforest climate (Af) with heavy rainfall year-round.

Climate data for Kutacane
Month	Jan	Feb	Mar	Apr	May	Jun	Jul	Aug	Sep	Oct	Nov	Dec	Year
Mean daily maximum °C (°F)	30.1 (86.2)	30.9 (87.6)	31.4 (88.5)	31.7 (89.1)	31.8 (89.2)	31.7 (89.1)	31.4 (88.5)	31.4 (88.5)	30.6 (87.1)	30.3 (86.5)	29.9 (85.8)	29.8 (85.6)	30.9 (87.6)
Daily mean °C (°F)	25.5 (77.9)	25.8 (78.4)	26.2 (79.2)	26.7 (80.1)	26.8 (80.2)	26.4 (79.5)	26.1 (79.0)	26.2 (79.2)	25.9 (78.6)	25.9 (78.6)	25.6 (78.1)	25.5 (77.9)	26.1 (78.9)
Mean daily minimum °C (°F)	20.9 (69.6)	20.8 (69.4)	21.1 (70.0)	21.7 (71.1)	21.8 (71.2)	21.2 (70.2)	20.9 (69.6)	21.0 (69.8)	21.3 (70.3)	21.6 (70.9)	21.3 (70.3)	21.2 (70.2)	21.2 (70.2)
Average rainfall mm (inches)	201 (7.9)	142 (5.6)	221 (8.7)	266 (10.5)	264 (10.4)	167 (6.6)	151 (5.9)	213 (8.4)	239 (9.4)	328 (12.9)	316 (12.4)	277 (10.9)	2,785 (109.6)
Source: Climate-Data.org

== See also ==
- Alas people
