= 2006 in aviation =

This is a list of aviation-related events from 2006.

== Events ==
- The national airline of Ecuador, Ecuatoriana de Aviación, goes out of business. It had flown from 1957 to 1993 and again since 1996.

=== January ===
- 1 January – The Government of Latvia reforms the Latvia Civil Aviation Administration to form the Civil Aviation Agency, which becomes Latvia's national civil aviation authority. It also creates the Aircraft Accident and Incident Investigation Bureau of the Republic of Latvia, which later will become the country's Transport Accident and Incident Investigation Bureau.
- 5 January – Independence Air ceases operations after declaring bankruptcy.
- 19 January
  - A Slovak Air Force Antonov An-24V carrying Slovak peacekeepers home from Kosovo strays off course, begins its descent toward Košice International Airport in Košice, Slovakia, too early, and crashes in northern Hungary near Hejce and Telkibánya, killing 42 of the 43 people on board and injuring the lone survivor.
  - Jet Airways announces its purchase of Air Sahara, creating the largest domestic airline in India.

=== February ===
- 1 February
  - The Transportation Safety Bureau replaces the Civil Aviation Safety Bureau of Hungary as the agency responsible for the investigation of aviation accidents in Hungary.
  - UAL Corporation, United Airlines' parent company, emerges from bankruptcy for the first time since 9 December 2002, the longest such filing in history.
- 8–11 February – The American adventurer Steve Fossett breaks the record for the absolute longest-distance flight without landing by taking off from the Kennedy Space Center at Cape Canaveral, Florida, on 8 February, circumnavigating the world eastbound, and, after passing over Florida, continuing across the Atlantic Ocean for a second time to land in Bournemouth, England, after a flight of 76 hours 43 minutes, covering 42,469.46 km (26,389.30 mi).
- 16 February – Kobe Airport, a controversial offshore airport in Kobe, Japan, opens for airline service.

=== March ===
- 10 March – Northwest Airlines purchases the United States Department of Transportation operating certificate of bankrupt Independence Air, which had ceased operations in January. Northwest plans to use the certificate for a new subcontractor regional airline, which will begin flight operations in May 2007 as Compass Airlines.
- 13 March – American television personality Peter Tomarken and his wife are killed when the engine of the Beechcraft Bonanza A36 Tomarken is piloting fails due to improper maintenance just after takeoff from Santa Monica Airport in Santa Monica, California, and the plane crashes 200 yards (180 meters) offshore in Santa Monica Bay as Tomarken attempts to return to the airport for an emergency landing.
- 14 March – The Cypriot airline Helios Airways is renamed Ajet.
- 16 March – New Kitakyushu Airport, a controversial offshore airport in Kitakyūshū in northeastern Kyūshū, Japan, opens for airline service. The Japanese discount airline Star Flyer makes the first flight to the new airport, arriving from Haneda, Japan.
- 25 March – The revolutionary scramjet engine Hyshot III, designed to fly at seven times the speed of sound is tested successfully at Woomera, Australia.
- 29 March – The Royal Navy's Fleet Air Arm withdraws the Sea Harrier from service.

=== April ===
- 1 April – Swiss International Air Lines joins Star Alliance.
- 10 April – South African Airways joins Star Alliance.
- 19 April – Noted American test pilot and aircraft designer Scott Crossfield is killed when he flies his Cessna 210 into a severe thunderstorm and it breaks up in mid-air and crashes in mountainous terrain near Ellijay, Georgia.
- 24 April – Aeroflot joins the Skyteam airline alliance, making it the first Russian airline to join any airline alliance.

=== May ===
- EgyptAir Express is founded as a subsidiary of EgyptAir to offer domestic service in Egypt and on regional routes using Embraer E-170 jets. It will begin fight operations in June.
- 1 May – The airline Song ceases operations and turns its fleet over to its owner, Delta Air Lines.
- 3 May – Armavia Flight 967, an Airbus A320-211, is advised to halt its final descent into Sochi International Airport in Sochi, Russia, and begins a go-around, during which it crashes into the Black Sea, killing all 113 people on board.
- 6 May – The United States Air Force retires the last Lockheed Martin C-141 Starlifter in its inventory, an aircraft named Hanoi Taxi. Hanoi Taxi lands for the last time and is received in a formal retirement ceremony at the National Museum of the United States Air Force at Wright-Patterson Air Force Base in Riverside, Ohio.
- 18 May – The world's biggest passenger jet, the Airbus A380, lands at Heathrow Airport for the first time, making its debut in the United Kingdom.
- 23 May – Boeing delivers the last two Boeing 717 airliners produced; the customers receiving them are AirTran Airways and Midwest Airlines. Boeing had manufactured 156 Boeing 717s before ceasing production in April 2006 due to slow sales. The Boeing 717 is the last commercial airplane produced at Boeing's facility in Long Beach, California.

=== June ===
- 1 June – EgyptAir Express, a subsidiary of EgyptAir offering domestic service in Egypt and on regional routes using Embraer E-170 jets, begins flight operations.
- 3 June – A Chinese KJ-200 airborne warning and control system aircraft crashes in Anhui province in the People's Republic of China. All 40 people on board die.
- 8 June – Australians Heather Swan and Glenn Singleman set a world record for the highest wingsuit flying BASE jump, jumping off Meru Peak in India at an altitude of 6,640 meters (21,780 feet).
- 23 June – The Royal Air Force retires its last English Electric Canberra from service. Canberras had been in service for 55 years.

=== July ===
- 8 July – Scientists at the University of Toronto Institute for Aerospace Studies in Toronto, Ontario, Canada, conduct the first confirmed flight of a manned ornithopter operating under its own power.
- 9 July – S7 Airlines Flight 778, an Airbus A310-300, crashes on landing at Irkutsk International Airport in Irkutsk, Russia, killing 124 of the 203 people on board and injuring all 79 survivors.
- 10 July
  - The Korea Aviation Accident Investigation Board merges with the Railway Accident Investigation Board to form the Aviation and Railway Accident Investigation Board, which becomes the government agency responsible for aviation accident investigations in South Korea.
  - All 45 people aboard Pakistan International Airlines Flight 688, a Fokker F27 Friendship, die in a crash on takeoff in Multan, Pakistan. Following the crash, Pakistan International withdraws all of its Fokker aircraft from service and replaces them with ATR aircraft.
- 21–26 July – The 17th FAI World Precision Flying Championship is held in Troyes, France. Individual winners are 1. Krzysztof Wieczorek (Poland) in a 3Xtrim, 2. Janusz Darocha (Poland) in a
- 23 July – A runway incursion which involved a United Airlines Boeing 737-322 and an Atlas Air Boeing 747-47UF. All 131 survive without injury.
- 26–31 July – The 15th FAI World Rally Flying Championship takes place in Troyes, France. Individual winners are Wacław Wieczorek/Michał Wieczorek (Poland), Jiří Filip/Michal Filip (Czech Republic), and Petr Opat/Tomas Rajdl (Czech Republic). Team winners are 1. Czech Republic, 2. Poland, and 3. France.

=== August ===
- 9 August – The Metropolitan Police Service arrests approximately 24 people in and around London for conspiring to detonate liquid explosives aboard at least 10 airliners travelling from the United Kingdom to the United States and Canada.
- 10 August – British authorities announce that a plot to simultaneously detonate bombs smuggled in hand luggage aboard ten airliners bound for the United States over the Atlantic Ocean has been foiled. Tightened security measures in the United Kingdom and United States and flight cancellations which happen afterwards cause severe chaos at several London airports.
- 9 August
  - Air Algérie Flight 2208, a Lockheed L-100-30 Hercules cargo aircraft, suffers an autopilot malfunction that puts it into a very steep and rapid descent over northern Italy. It crashes, killing its entire crew of three.
- 22 August – Pulkovo Aviation Enterprise Flight 612, a Tupolev Tu-154M carrying 160 passengers and 10 crew on a domestic flight from Anapa to Saint Petersburg, Russia, descends sharply from 37,000 feet (11,000 m) and crashes in eastern Ukraine, killing everyone on board. It would be the deadliest aviation disaster of 2006.
- 25 August – The first Block 20 RQ-4 Global Hawk is rolled out at Northrop Grumman's Plant 42 manufacturing facility in Palmdale, California.
- 27 August
  - Comair Flight 5191, a Bombardier CRJ100 ER carrying 47 passengers and three crew members, attempts to take off from Blue Grass Airport in Lexington, Kentucky], using the wrong runway. The runway is too short, and the aircraft runs off the end of the runway and crashes without becoming airborne. The first officer survives in critical condition; the other 49 people on board die.
  - The Boeing 737-900ER/9GP is unveiled. Its first operator is Lion Air.
- 30 August – Steve Fossett and Einar Enevoldson pilot the Windward Performance Perlan sailplane to a new glider absolute world altitude record of 50,727 feet (15,462 meters) over the Patagonia region of Argentina. The record will stand until September 2017.

=== September ===
- One of five existing Aerocar flying cars is put up for sale for US$3.5 million
- 1 September – Iran Air Tours Flight 945, a Tupolev Tu-154M, crashes while attempting to land in Mashad, Iran, killing 28 of the 148 people on board.
- 2 September – The Royal Air Force Hawker Siddeley Nimrod XV230 catches fire in the air during a reconnaissance flight due to a fuel leak that occurs during aerial refueling and crashes in the Panjwaye District of Afghanistan, killing all 14 people on board. It is the United Kingdom's single deadliest military loss since the Falklands War of 1982.
- 3 September – South Ossetian forces fire at a Georgian Mil Mi-8 (NATO reporting name "Hip") helicopter carrying Georgian Minister of Defense Irakli Okruashvili and the deputy chief of staff of the Georgian armed forces as it flies over the separatist-held territory of South Ossetia. The helicopter is slightly damaged but lands safely in Georgian government-controlled territory.
- 6 September – Lynx Aviation begins operation as a feeder airline for Frontier Airlines.
- 7 September – Israel lifts the air blockade of Lebanon it had imposed on 13 July.
- 8 September – BWIA West Indies Airways announces that it will shut down at the end of the year.
- 10 September – Swedish aerobatic champion Gabor Varga is killed instantly during the Aero GP race when his Yakovlev Yak-55 collides in mid-air over Marsamxett Harbour off Valletta, Malta, with an Extra EA-200 flown by Irish pilot Eddie Groggins. Groggins survives with minor injuries.
- 11 September – A Russian Ground Forces Mil Mi-8 helicopter crashes near Vladikavkaz, Russia, killing all 12 people on board, including Lieutenant-General Pavel Yaroslavtsev, deputy chief for army logistics, Lieutenant-General Viktor Guliaev, deputy chief of army medical units, and Major-General Vladimir Sorokin. The Ossetian rebel group Kataib al-Khoul claims to have shot the helicopter down.
- 15 September
  - Mexican actor Pablo Santos is killed when he attempts an emergency landing at Toluca International Airport in Toluca, Mexico, after the Piper Malibu he is piloting runs low on fuel and crashes over a mile (1.6 km) short of the runway. One of his passengers is fatally injured and dies the following day, but his other five passengers survive.
  - EasyJet Flight 6074 bound for Bristol Airport, United Kingdom, suffered serious electrical problems in the air and was unable to contact ATC. Due to this, the Airbus A319-111 nearly collided with American Airlines Flight 63, a Boeing 777-223ER. The ATC was able to request AAL63 to descend, narrowly missing Flight 6074. The pilots of EasyJet Flight 6074 managed to reconfigure their transponder only and was able to land safely.
- 19 September – A United States Air Force B-52H Stratofortress makes the first flight of a U.S. Air Force aircraft powered partially by a coal-based fuel, flying over Edwards Air Force Base, California, using a fuel made of a blend of conventional JP-8 jet fuel and Fischer–Tropsch fuel made from coal in two of its engines and JP-8 in its other six engines. The flight begins the final phase of U.S. Air Force test flights to achieve the certification of its B-52 fleet to operate on coal-based fuels.
- 22 September – Fighter Squadron 213 (VF-213) retires the last Grumman F-14 Tomcat fighter, an F-14D, from United States Navy service. During a U.S. Navy career of over 33 years, the F-14 has served as a long-range fleet air defense fighter, attack aircraft, and reconnaissance aircraft, and scored five air-to-air kills, shooting down four Libyan Air Force fighters and an Iraqi helicopter. The U.S. Navy's retirement of the Tomcat means that the F-14 remains in service only with the Islamic Republic of Iran Air Force.
- 29 September – Gol Transportes Aéreos Flight 1907, a Boeing 737-8EH, collides in mid-air with an Embraer Legacy 600 business jet and crashes in Mato Grosso, Brazil. The Embraer Legacy, with seven on board, lands safely with no reported injuries. All 154 people on board the Boeing 737 perish.

=== October ===
- 1 October – The Spanish low-cost airline Clickair begins operations, with a fleet of three Airbus A320 airliners flying five routes from the airline's Barcelona hub.
- 3 October – Hakan Ekinci hijacks Turkish Airlines Flight 1476, a Boeing 737-400, over Greece, demanding to be flown to Rome, Italy, to speak to Pope Benedict XVI. Greek and Italian F-16 Fighting Falcons escort the plane to a landing in Brindisi, Italy, where Ekinci is arrested. No one is injured in the incident.
- 10 October – Atlantic Airways Flight 670, a BAe 146, slides off the runway at Stord Airport, Norway, killing four of the 16 people on board.
- 11 October – New York Yankees baseball pitcher Cory Lidle's Cirrus SR20 aircraft stalls during a tight turn and crashes into the 20th story of a 50-story Manhattan residential building in New York City, killing Lidle and his flight instructor.
- 25 October – Oasis Hong Kong Airlines begins service with a departure for London Gatwick Airport scheduled. Due to problems with rights to fly over Russia, the initial flight is delayed to 26 October.
- 26 October – The left wing of a Swedish Coast Guard CASA C-212 Aviocar detaches in flight due to metal fatigue while the plane is making a low-level pass over the Skanör-Falsterbo Coast Guard Station in Sweden. The C-212 crashes in the Falsterbo Canal, killing all four people on board. The crash prompts the Swedish Coast Guard to ground its two surviving C-212s, which it sells to Uruguay.
- 28 October – Continental Airlines Flight 1883, a Boeing 757-224 with 154 people on board, mistakenly lands on a taxiway instead of a runway at Newark Liberty International Airport in Newark, New Jersey, United States. It rolls to a stop without incident.
- 29 October – ADC Airlines Flight 53, a Boeing 737-2B7, crashes just after takeoff from Nnamdi Azikiwe International Airport in Abuja, Nigeria, killing 96 of the 105 people on board and injuring all nine survivors. One person on the ground also dies.
- 31 October – The Cypriot airline Ajet, formerly known as Helios Airways, ceases operations.

=== November ===
- 20 November – Six Muslim imams are removed from US Airways Flight 300 at Minneapolis-St. Paul International Airport in Hennepin County, Minnesota, after crew members and other passengers aboard the plane become alarmed by what they claim is suspicious behavior by the imams. After the imams seek damages, US Airways will settle with them out of court in 2009.

=== December ===
- 1 December
  - Hong Kong-based CR Airways changes its name to Hong Kong Airlines.
  - Air Berlin orders 60 Boeing 737s, with their delivery scheduled for November 2007.
  - The United States Air Force inactivates the Sixteenth Air Force, simultaneously reconstituting it as the 16th Air Expeditionary Task Force.
- 5 December – Lufthansa becomes the first airline to order the Boeing 747-8. It orders 20 of the planes, with options for an additional 20.
- 8 December – A National Aeronautics and Space Administration (NASA) F/A-18 Hornet modified with Active Aeroelastic Wing (AAW) Technology is designated the X-53.
- 10 December – A Bell 412SP medevac helicopter crashes in mountainous terrain near Hesperia, California, killing all three people – the pilot and two medical crew members – on board. A fire resulting from the crash burns two acres (8,100 square meters) of the mountainside.
- 19 December – A United States Air Force B-52H Stratofortress makes the first flight of a U.S. Air Force aircraft powered entirely by a coal-based fuel, flying over Edwards Air Force Base, California, using a fuel made by Syntroleum of a blend of conventional JP-8 jet fuel and Fischer–Tropsch fuel made from coal in all eight of its engines.
- 27 December – A Eurocopter AS365 Dauphin crashes approximately 24 miles from the shoreline of Morecambe Bay, Lancashire, England, while transporting gas platform crews. Six of the seven people aboard die, with the seventh missing and never recovered.
- 29 December – FlyersRights.org is founded as an American not-for-profit organization that supports legislation protecting the rights of airline passengers, improving visibility in the reporting of flight delays by commercial airlines, and increasing the distance between rows of airline seats.
- 30 December – A U.S. Air Force Boeing VC-25A transports the body of former U.S. President Gerald R. Ford from Palm Springs International Airport in Palm Springs, California, to Washington, D.C., for memorial services.
- 31 December – BWIA West Indies Airways shuts down after 66 years of operations. It is replaced by a new entity, Caribbean Airlines, the next day.

== First flights ==
=== January ===
- 7 January - Spectrum S-33 Independence
- 31 January – Lockheed Martin P-791

=== March ===
- 3 March - Arion Lightning
- 13 March - Hongdu JL-10

=== April ===
- 7 April – First free-flight of Boeing X-37
- 18 April - Diamond D-Jet

=== May ===
- 13 May - Excel-Jet Sport Jet

=== June ===
- 8 June – Bell 417
- 19 June – Lockheed C-5M Super Galaxy
- 23 June – Cessna NGP

=== July ===
- 6 July - Dean-Wilson Whitney Boomerang
- 8 July - UTIAS Ornithopter No.1
- 29 July - Kestrel K-350

=== August ===
- 9 August – BAE Skylynx II UAV
- 15 August – EA-18 Growler First production aircraft

=== September ===
- 5 September – Boeing 737-900ER.
- 12 September – Boeing 747 Large Cargo Freighter.
- 15 September - DAC RangeR

=== October ===
- 6 October - US Aircraft A-67 Dragon
- 13 October – Cessna 162 Skycatcher concept aircraft N158CS
- 16 October - Nexaer LS1
- 23 October – Production CH-47F Chinook

=== November ===
- 9 November - Van's Aircraft RV-12

=== December ===
- 15 December – Lockheed Martin F-35 Lightning II

== Entered service ==
- February – Boeing 777-200LR Worldliner with PIA

== Retirements ==
- 22 September – Grumman F-14 Tomcat from United States Navy service by Fighter Squadron (VF-213)

== Deadliest crash ==
The deadliest crash of this year was Pulkovo Aviation Enterprise Flight 612, a Tupolev Tu-154 which crashed near Sukha Balka, Ukraine on 22 August, killing all 170 people on board.
