= Elbit Hermes 90 =

Israeli unmanned aerial vehicle

Hermes 90
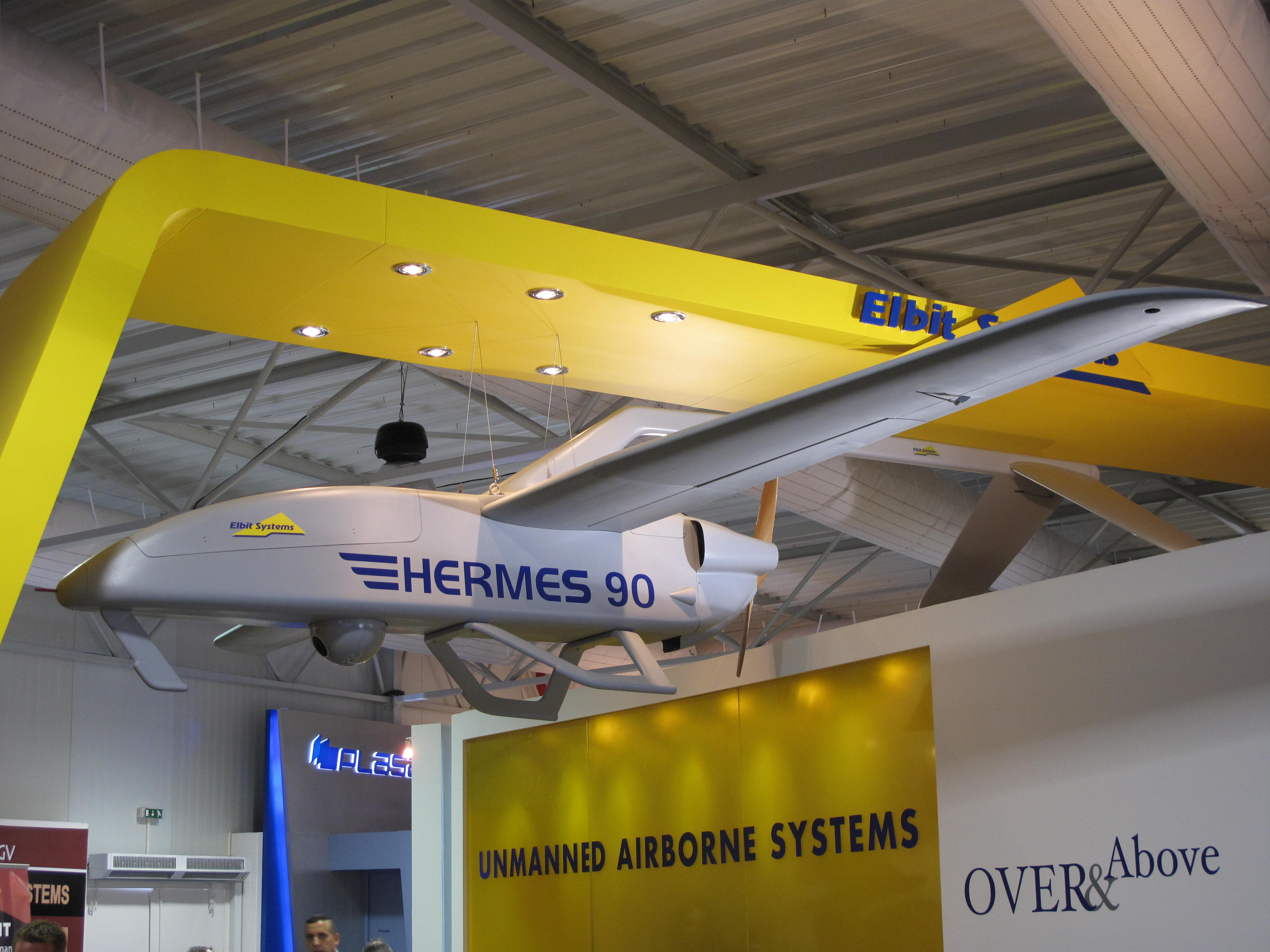
- UCAV Elbit Hermes 90 at the Paris Air Show 2009

General information
- Type: Unmanned aerial vehicle
- National origin: Israel
- Manufacturer: Elbit Systems
- Status: Active
- Primary user: Israeli Air Force

History
- Introduction date: 2009

The Elbit Systems Hermes 90 is an unmanned aerial vehicle (UAV) designed for tactical short-range missions using a heavy-fuel motor.

Jane's claims that the Hermes 90 has its roots in the IAI I-View and later in the BAE Skylynx II. Ownership of rights were subsequently moved to Elbit Systems.

The Hermes 90 has an operating range of about 15 hours and 100 km.

In September 2009, the Hermes 90 made its maiden flight.

== Specifications ==
Data from Elbit Systems Australia

General characteristics

- Capacity: 25 kg (55 lb) payload
- Gross weight: 115 kg (254 lb)

Performance

- Range: 100 km (62 mi, 54 nmi)
- Endurance: 15 hours
- Service ceiling: 4,600 m (15,000 ft)
