= Fyrudden =

Coordinates: 58.192°N 16.852°E

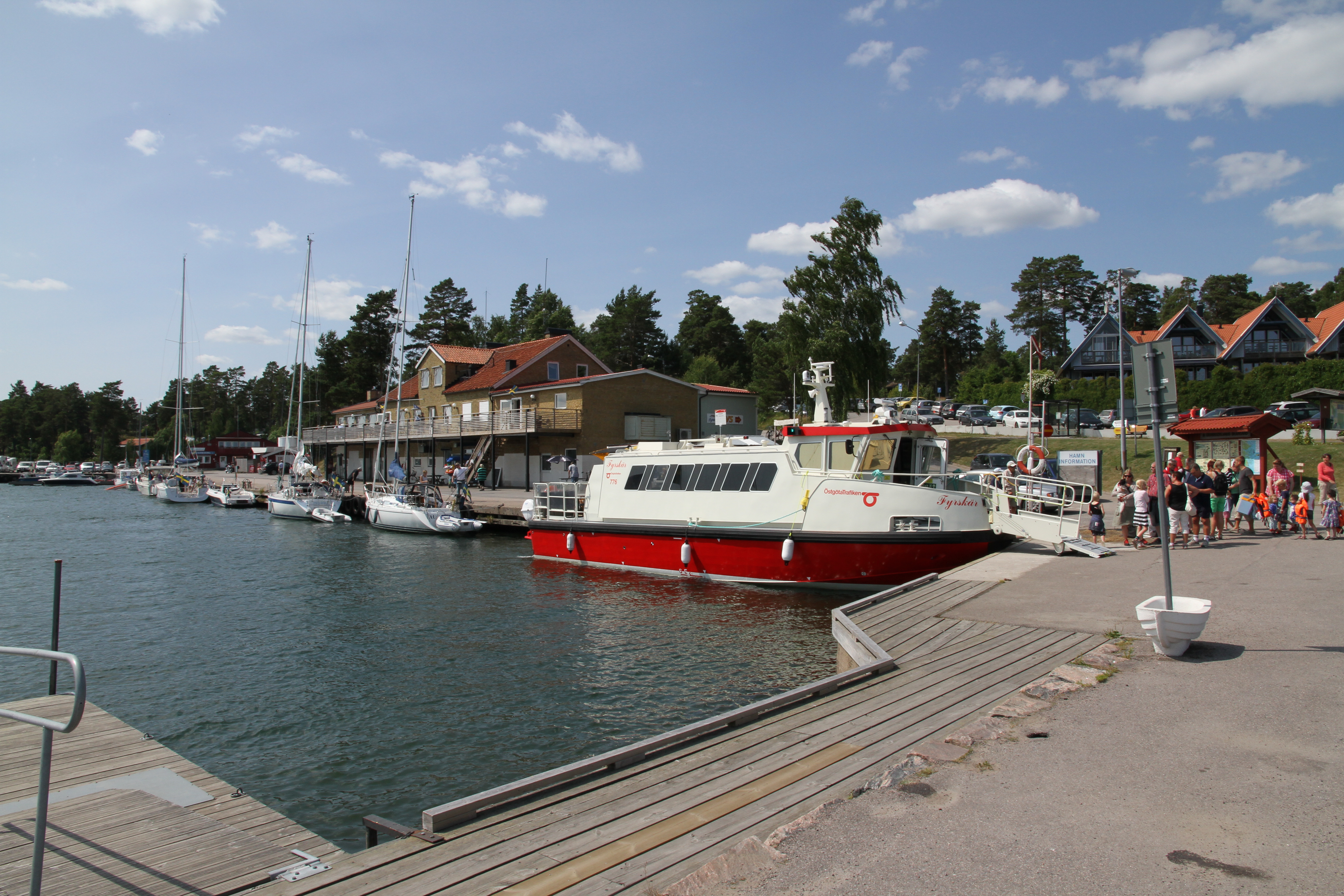
FyryddenGryt20130709

Fyrudden is a coastal locality in Valdemarsvik Municipality, Östergötland County, Sweden, located at the extreme southeastern end of a narrow peninsula. The name literally means "the lighthouse point".

County road 212 from Valdemarsvik passes by Gryt to terminate at Fyrudden, and the large north-south waterway of Östergötland archipelago passes nearby. Fyrudden is thus easily accessible from sea and from land it has become a popular guest harbor. Apart from harbor facilities, including Swedish Coast Guard station Ks Gryt, there is also a restaurant, a grocery store, and a bus stop with connections to Valdemarsvik, Söderköping och Norrköping. During the summer, daily boat trips to Harstena (about 6 nautical miles (11 km) to the northeast) depart from Fyrudden.
