= PLH =

PLH may refer to:

- Paul Löbe House, building in Berlin, Germany
- Civil Aviation Authority (Hungary), Polgári Légiközlekedési Hatóság in Hungarian
- Plymouth City Airport, IATA code
- Liberal Party of Honduras, Partido Liberal de Honduras in Spanish
- PLH Architects, a Danish architecture firm
- Personal Licence Holder, a status in UK Licensing law
- Polska Liga Hokejowa, top ice hockey league in Poland
