= NKH (disambiguation) =

NKH may refer to:

- Non-ketotic hyperglycinemia, a rare autosomal recessive disorder of glycine metabolism
- nkh, the ISO 639 code for Kuzhami language
- Nemzeti Közlekedési Hatóság, the Hungarian government agency
- Nanjing South railway station, the telegram code NKH
- Nkh (trigraph)
