= CASB =

CASB as an acronym may refer to:

- California Southern Bankruptcy Court, the United States bankruptcy court for the Southern District of California
- Canadian Aviation Safety Board, predecessor to the Transportation Safety Board of Canada
- Civil Aviation Safety Bureau of Hungary or Civil Aviation Safety Board
- Cloud access security broker
- Cost Accounting Standards Board, a U.S. board that sets government contract cost standards
