= National Transport Authority =

National Transport Authority may refer to:

- National Transport Authority (Hungary)
- National Transport Authority (Ireland)
