= Alpine Eternity =

Oil and chemical tanker

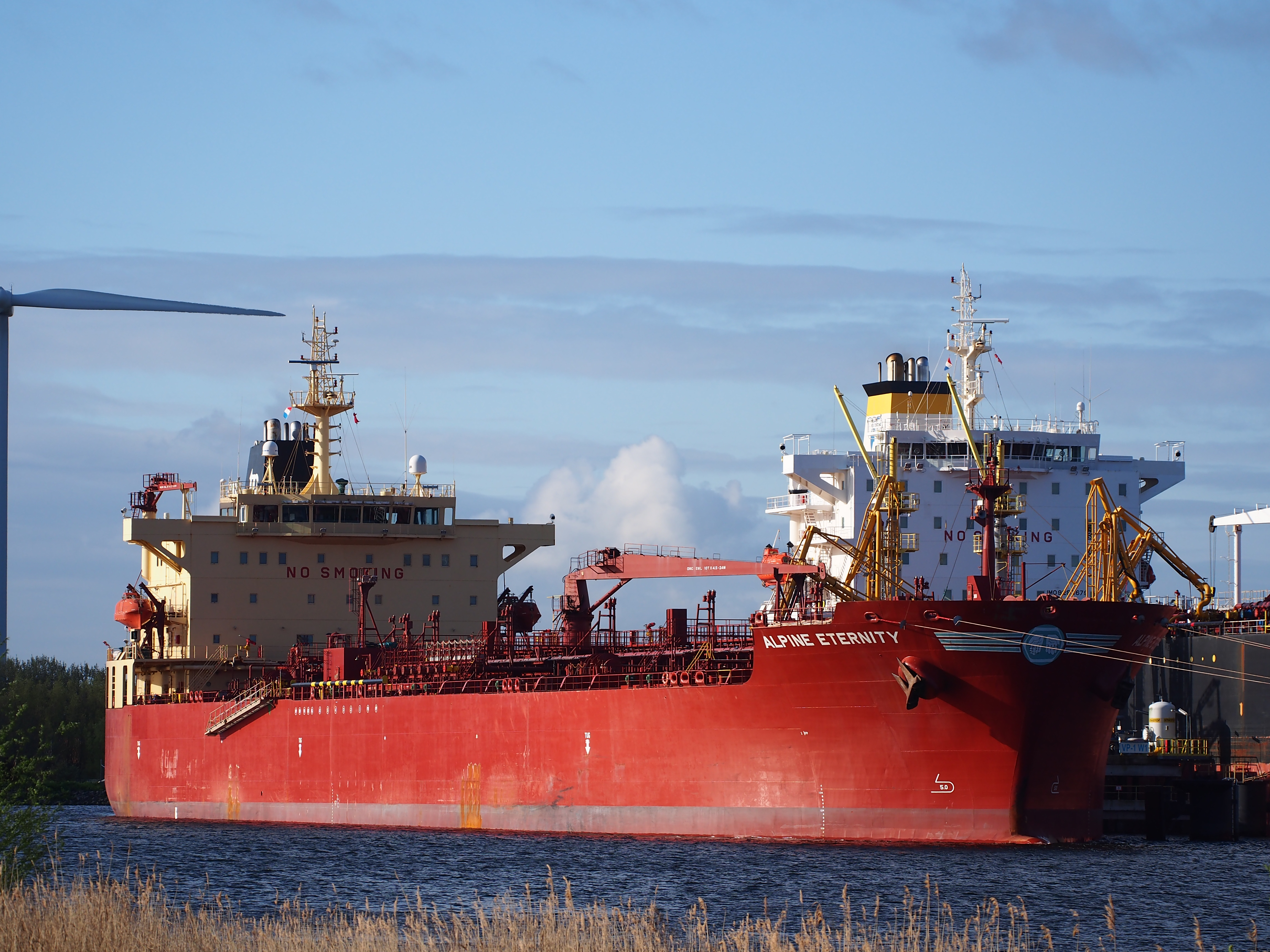
- Alpine Eternity (ship, 2009) IMO 9430272 Afrikahaven Port of Amsterdam

History
- Name: Alpine Eternity
- Owner: South Maritime Pte Ltd
- Operator: Transpetrol
- Port of registry: Marshall Islands
- Completed: 2009
- Identification: IMO number: 9430272; MMSI number: 563944000; Callsign: 9VGA8
- Status: In service

General characteristics
- Tonnage: 29,130 GT; 46,105 DWT
- Length: 183 metres (600 ft)
- Beam: 32.23 metres (105.7 ft)

Jin Hui, formerly Celsius Roskilde and before that Alpine Eternity, is an oil and chemical tanker.

== 2015 Persian Gulf incident ==
On 14 May 2015, Iranian patrol boats intercepted Alpine Eternity as she transited the Strait of Hormuz and ordered her to sail into Iranian waters. When the ship's master refused, the patrol boats fired shots across the bow of the vessel, at which point the tanker shifted course to the territorial waters of the United Arab Emirates (UAE). The patrol boats then fired directly upon the tanker in attempt to disable her. Several shots hit the ship, but she was not disabled. The patrol boats pursued Alpine Eternity for nearly an hour as she headed for port in the UAE and they only broke off pursuit when UAE coast guard ships arrived on the scene.

The following day, an Iranian official said that Iran had attempted to seize Alpine Eternity because she had hit an Iranian oil rig on 22 March 2015, doing $300 million in damage, and the vessel's operator, Transpetrol, had not taken steps to pay compensation. Singapore, the country to which the vessel was registered, condemned Iran's action as "a serious violation of international law".

== Subsequent history ==
In June 2024 the vessel was renamed Jin Hui. In December 2025 she was sold to undisclosed interests and became associated with the Russian shadow fleet, operating outside Western sanctions regimes. The vessel was subsequently listed on the sanctions registers of the European Union, the United Kingdom, Ukraine, and Switzerland.

On 3 May 2026 the Swedish Coast Guard intercepted Jin Hui in Swedish territorial waters south-west of Trelleborg and directed her to an anchorage off the port. The vessel was suspected of sailing under a false Syrian flag and of failing to meet minimum seaworthiness standards. Swedish Prime Minister Ulf Kristersson stated: "The vessel is suspected of being part of the Russian shadow fleet and for sailing under false flag. There are also concerns regarding insufficient seaworthiness and insurance. We protect our waters." On 5 May 2026 the ship's captain, a Chinese national, was remanded in custody on suspicion of gross use of false documents and of violating the Swedish maritime code through unseaworthiness.
