= Civil Aviation Authority (Hungary) =

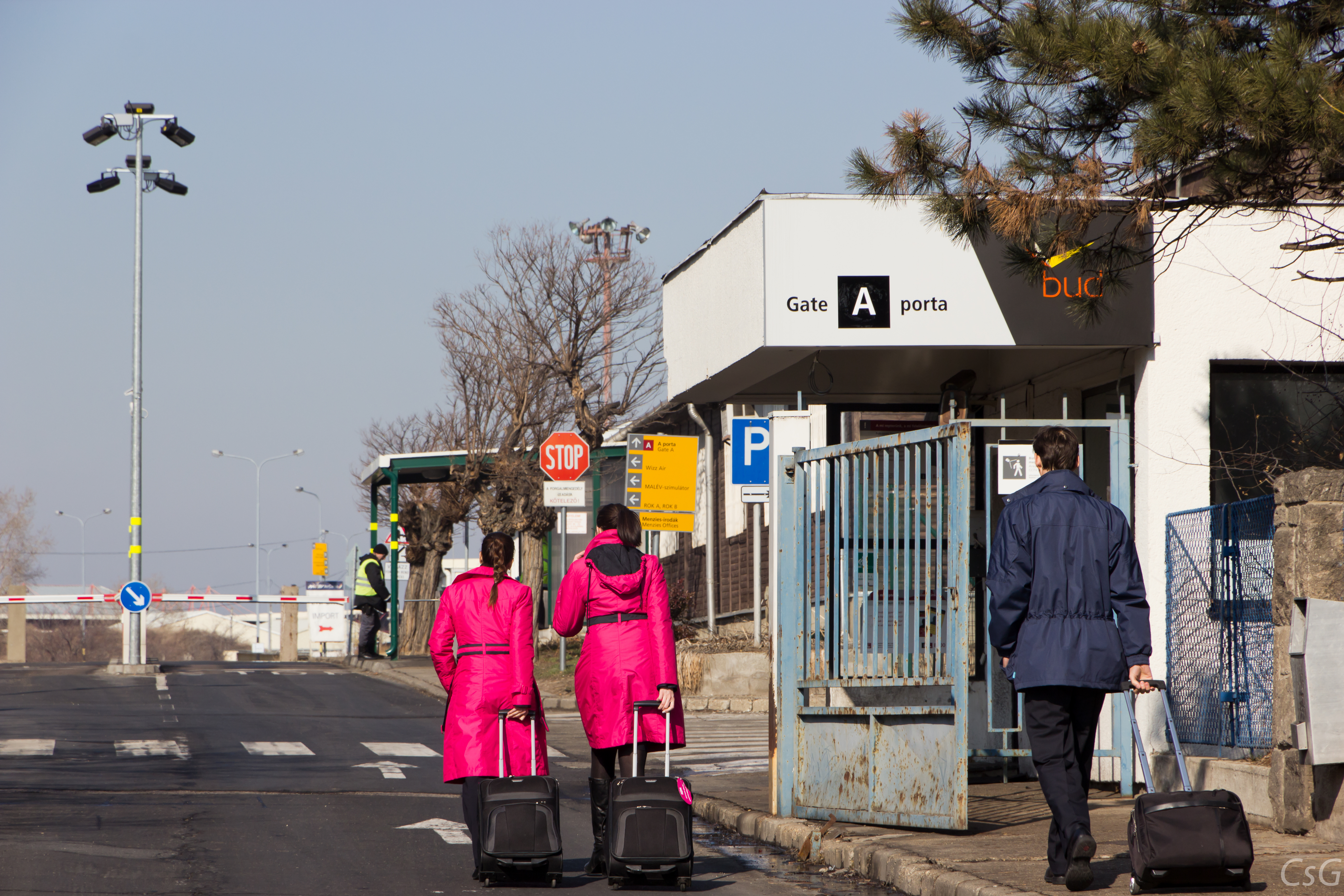
Gate A at Budapest Airport leads to the former CAA-HU head office

The Civil Aviation Authority (CAA-HU, Hungarian: Polgári Légiközlekedési Hatóság, PLH), earlier the Civil Aviation Administration (Légügyi Igazgatóság, LUI), was a government agency of Hungary that acted as that country's civil aviation authority. The head office was located in Building 13 of Budapest Ferihegy International Airport Terminal 1 in Budapest.

In 2007 the successor agency, the National Transport Authority, began operations on 1 January 2007. The Transportation Safety Bureau (previously the Civil Aviation Safety Bureau of Hungary) is the agency that investigates transport accidents and incidents.
