= Army Aviation Command =

Army Aviation Command might refer to:

- Army Aviation Command (Argentina)
- Army Aviation Command (Australia)
- Brazilian Army Aviation Command
- Indonesian Army Aviation Command
- Turkish Army Aviation Command
- United States Army
  - Army Reserve Aviation Command
  - United States Army Aviation and Missile Command
  - U.S. Army Special Operations Aviation Command
