= Harstena =

Island in Valdemarsvik municipality, Sweden

Coordinates: 58°15′10″N 17°0′30″E

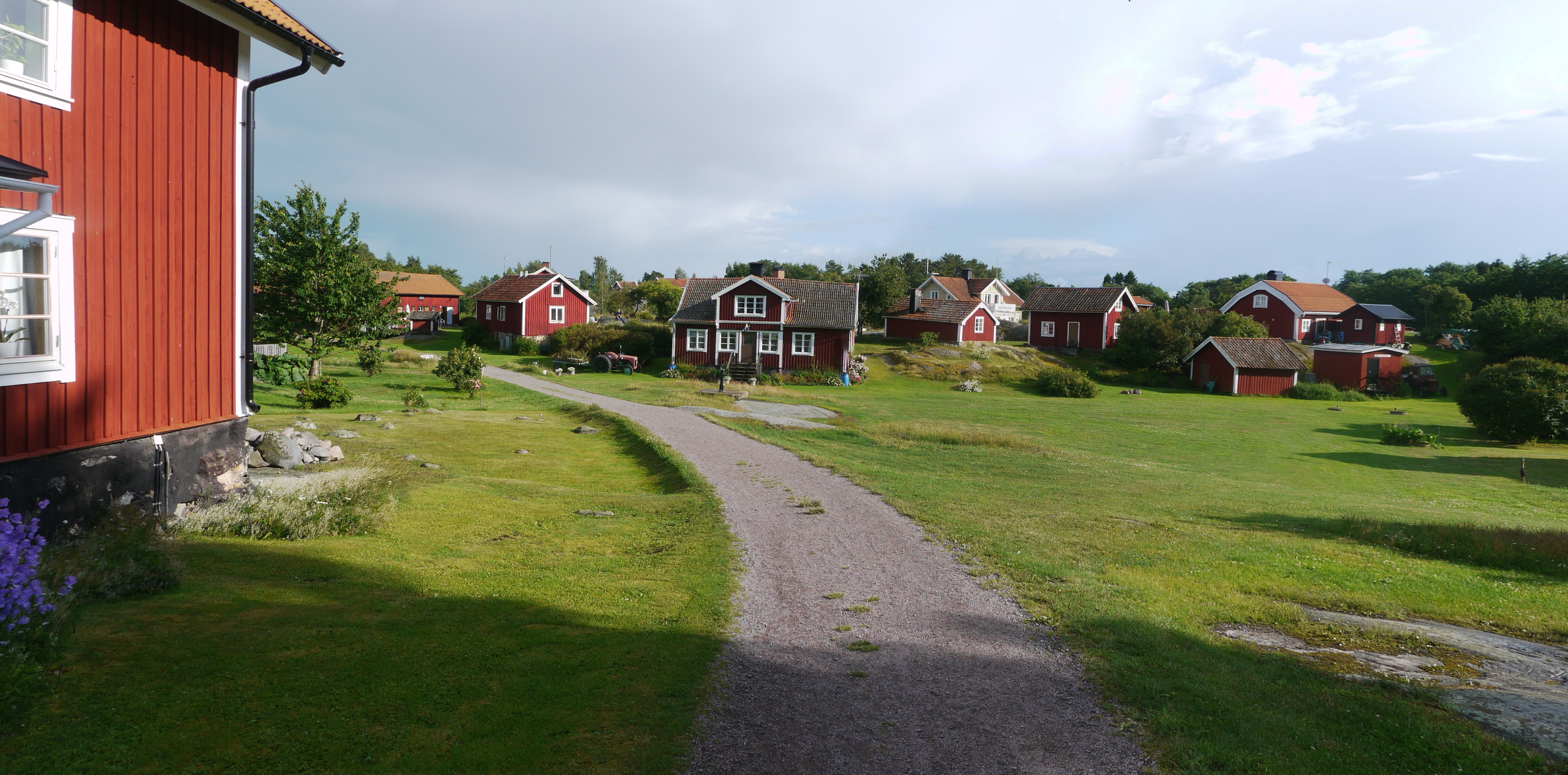
Scenery from Harstena

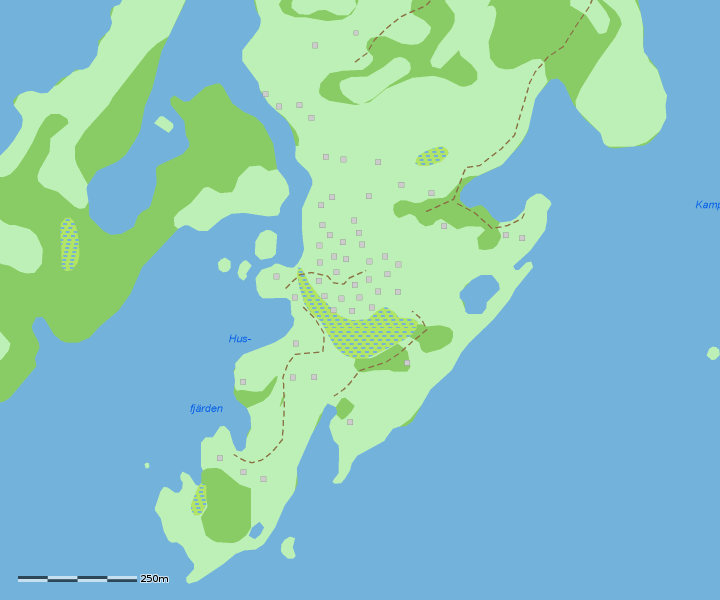
Map of Harstena.

Harstena (Swedish pronunciation: [ˈhâʂːˌteːna]) is an island located in the northern part of the Gryt archipelago in Valdemarsvik municipality, Sweden. The island is principally known for the seal hunting that was once carried out there, but also as one of the stations for the shipping forecast broadcast by Sveriges Radio. The island is a popular tourist attraction in summer, when daily boat tours depart from Fyrudden and Tyrislöt.

The island Hargstenö was mentioned in Gustav Vasa's jordebok from 1543 but burial sites indicate that it was inhabited already in the Iron Age. The number of residents reached a maximum in the 19th century when 70–80 people made their living on the island. Taxation records from that time show that fishing and seal hunting were the main source of income. The seal catch was the main source of income until the 1940s when the price of seal fur dropped. Seals became extinct during the 1960s and 1970s but reestablished themselves during the 1990s. A seal colony numbering around 60 animals has established itself in a special protected area.

The seal blubber boilers were built on the island in 1911, renovated 1999 and were declared protected 2011. They are today used as a museum

The island is also known for its fresh water tarn with its red water lilies. The number of residents diminished during the 20th century and today Harstena has only a few year-round residents. The island was reachable by telephone in 1930 and electrified 1945.

== Climate ==
Harstena has an oceanic climate that is similar to most of southern Sweden.

Climate data for Harstena, averages 2002–2018; extremes since 1942
Month	Jan	Feb	Mar	Apr	May	Jun	Jul	Aug	Sep	Oct	Nov	Dec	Year
Record high °C (°F)	11.7 (53.1)	15.6 (60.1)	18.5 (65.3)	21.6 (70.9)	27.4 (81.3)	32.1 (89.8)	31.3 (88.3)	33.5 (92.3)	26.8 (80.2)	22.6 (72.7)	15.1 (59.2)	12.9 (55.2)	33.5 (92.3)
Mean maximum °C (°F)	7.4 (45.3)	7.3 (45.1)	13.0 (55.4)	16.4 (61.5)	21.6 (70.9)	25.6 (78.1)	27.4 (81.3)	26.3 (79.3)	21.8 (71.2)	16.1 (61.0)	11.6 (52.9)	8.3 (46.9)	28.0 (82.4)
Mean daily maximum °C (°F)	1.6 (34.9)	1.7 (35.1)	4.9 (40.8)	9.4 (48.9)	14.5 (58.1)	19.4 (66.9)	22.4 (72.3)	21.5 (70.7)	17.1 (62.8)	10.7 (51.3)	6.3 (43.3)	3.5 (38.3)	11.1 (51.9)
Daily mean °C (°F)	−0.4 (31.3)	−0.4 (31.3)	2.1 (35.8)	6.1 (43.0)	10.9 (51.6)	15.7 (60.3)	18.9 (66.0)	18.2 (64.8)	14.2 (57.6)	8.6 (47.5)	4.6 (40.3)	1.7 (35.1)	8.4 (47.1)
Mean daily minimum °C (°F)	−2.3 (27.9)	−2.5 (27.5)	−0.8 (30.6)	2.7 (36.9)	7.3 (45.1)	11.9 (53.4)	15.3 (59.5)	14.9 (58.8)	11.3 (52.3)	6.5 (43.7)	2.9 (37.2)	−0.2 (31.6)	5.6 (42.0)
Mean minimum °C (°F)	−10.3 (13.5)	−9.6 (14.7)	−6.2 (20.8)	−1.1 (30.0)	3.2 (37.8)	7.9 (46.2)	11.8 (53.2)	10.9 (51.6)	6.3 (43.3)	1.2 (34.2)	−3.2 (26.2)	−7.0 (19.4)	−12.6 (9.3)
Record low °C (°F)	−24.0 (−11.2)	−26.1 (−15.0)	−19.2 (−2.6)	−10.0 (14.0)	−1.7 (28.9)	1.6 (34.9)	6.2 (43.2)	7.1 (44.8)	1.0 (33.8)	−4.6 (23.7)	−12.1 (10.2)	−16.7 (1.9)	−26.1 (−15.0)
Average precipitation mm (inches)	31.3 (1.23)	26.6 (1.05)	22.3 (0.88)	24.8 (0.98)	38.4 (1.51)	51.0 (2.01)	57.0 (2.24)	62.4 (2.46)	36.4 (1.43)	52.3 (2.06)	47.9 (1.89)	39.3 (1.55)	489.7 (19.29)
Source 1: SMHI Open Data
Source 2: SMHI average data 2002–2018
