= Continental Airlines Flight 1883 =

2006 aviation incident

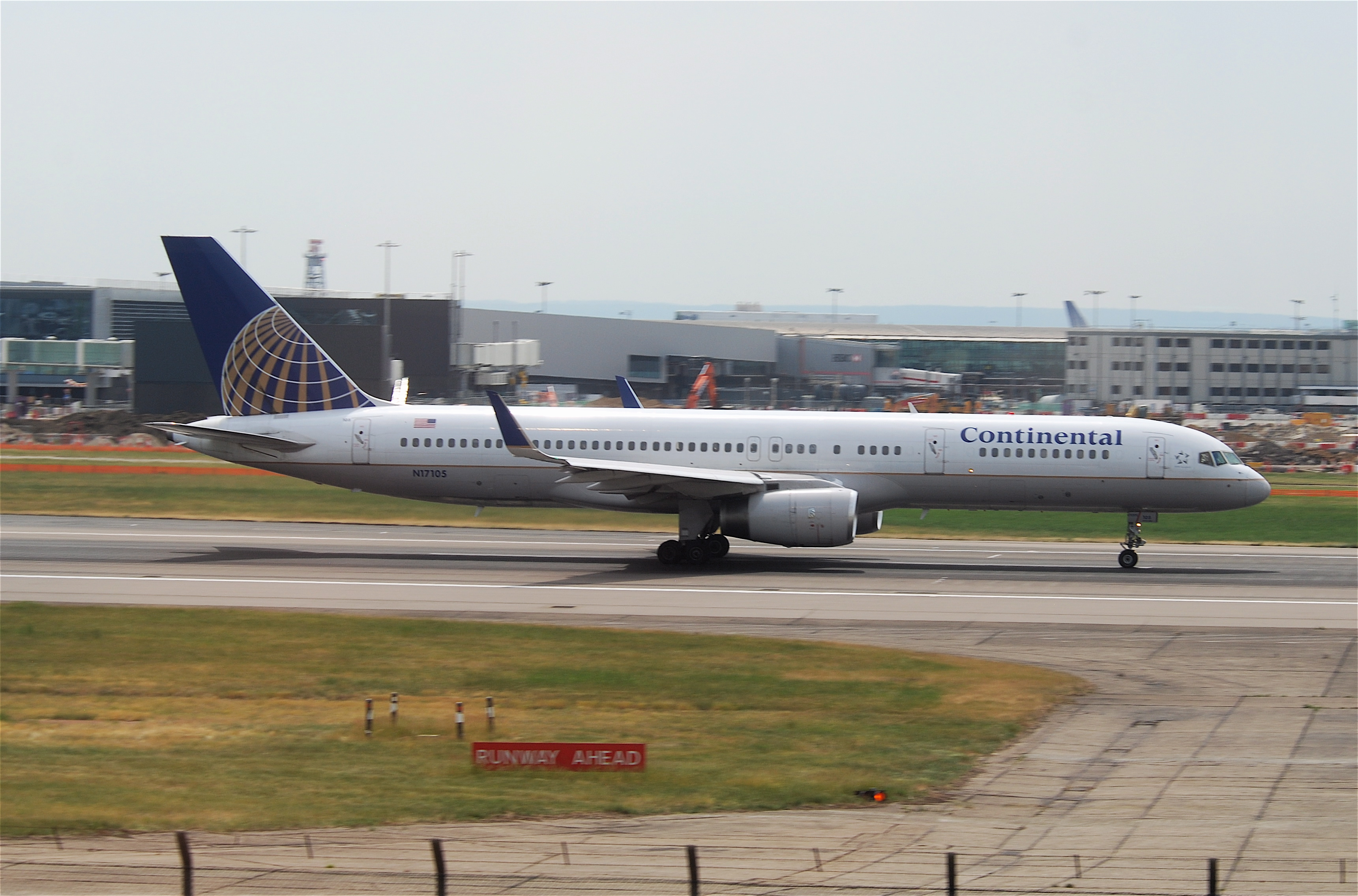
- N17105, the aircraft involved in the incident, photographed in 2010

Incident
- Date: October 28, 2006
- Summary: Taxiway landing due to runway identification error
- Site: Newark Liberty International Airport, Newark, New Jersey, United States

Aircraft
- Aircraft type: Boeing 757-224
- Operator: Continental Airlines
- Registration: N17105
- Flight origin: Orlando International Airport
- Destination: Newark Liberty International Airport
- Occupants: 154
- Passengers: 148
- Crew: 6
- Fatalities: 0
- Injuries: 0
- Survivors: 154

Continental Airlines Flight 1883 was a Boeing 757 that mistakenly landed on a taxiway at Newark Liberty International Airport on the evening of October 28, 2006. There were no reported injuries or damage, but the narrowly averted disaster was investigated by the National Transportation Safety Board, and caused the Federal Aviation Administration to reevaluate and modify air and ground safety procedures at and around Newark Airport.

== Aircraft and flight information ==
Continental Airlines Flight 1883 was a regularly scheduled domestic passenger flight to Newark from Orlando International Airport in Orlando, Florida. On October 28, 2006, the flight was operated using a Boeing 757-224, a narrow-body twin-engine jet airliner (registration number N17105). Flight 1883 had 148 passengers and 6 crew on board.

The first officer was flying the aircraft for the approach to Newark; it was his first time landing at Newark on runway 29.

== Incident ==
Flight 1883 approached Newark from the north, initially planning to land on runway 22L using an ILS instrument approach. As the flight descended to an altitude of about 8,000–9,000 feet (2,400–2,700 m), air traffic controllers instructed Flight 1883 to circle to land on runway 29. This required descending toward runway 22L, followed by a low altitude circling maneuver that required a right turn at only 900 feet (270 m) to line up for runway 29.

As the flight crew descended and turned toward the airport, they observed four white path indicator lights, which they believed were located to the left of the runway. This was incorrect; the instrument procedures for Newark described these indicator lights as being to the right of the runway. Keeping the indicator lights to their left, the pilots landed on 75 feet (23 m) wide taxiway Z at 18:31 EDT. The Boeing 757 jetliner, with a wingspan of 124 feet (38 m), touched down at 130 knots (150 mph; 240 km/h) near the intersection of taxiways Z and R, rolled out and came to a stop without incident. The aircraft then taxied to the gate where all passengers were deplaned. According to the FAA, all lighting systems associated with runway 29 and taxiway Z were operating normally at the time. Runway 29, the intended landing runway, is 150 feet (46 m) wide and 6,800 feet (2,100 m) long.

== Investigation ==
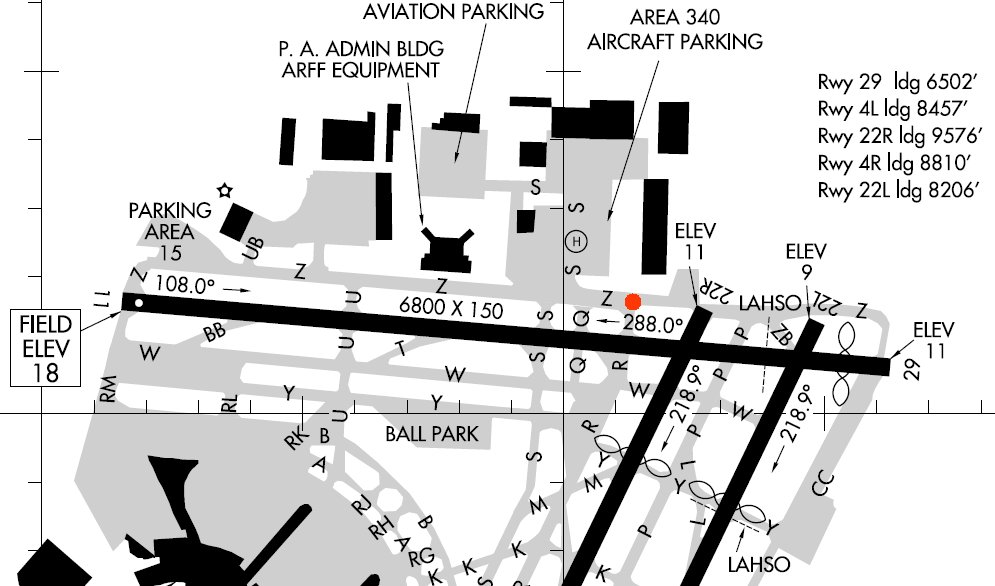
Section of KEWR taxiway diagram with red dot depicting approx. location of touchdown - landing roll was westbound on Z, leftward from red dot

The incident was investigated by the National Transportation Safety Board (NTSB).

As part of its investigation, the NTSB conducted a flight around the airport, to evaluate the lighting and visibility of the runways and taxiways. With the lighting of runway 29 and the taxiway set to the same brightness levels used during the incident, the NTSB noted that the lights for taxiway Z appeared slightly brighter than the lights for runway 29. During testing, however, the difference in lighting color (green centerline lights used on Z to indicate a taxiway, white centerline lights used on 29 to indicate a runway) was clearly visible to planes on approach.

In its final report, the NTSB described the probable cause of the incident as:

The flight crew's misidentification of the parallel taxiway as the active runway, resulting in the flight crew executing a landing on the taxiway. Contributing was the night lighting conditions.

== Aftermath ==
This rare event caused a reassessment of differential runway and taxiway lighting, as well as arrival procedures at Newark airport. The NTSB noted in its report that as a result of the incident, the FAA instituted two types of changes in its procedures, in the air and on the ground, to reduce the chance of a recurrence. In the air, the FAA added two new arrival procedures, GIMEE 19-7-1 and GRITY 19-7-1A, which it expects will provide improved navigational guidance to the runway under similar conditions. On the ground, the FAA and airport officials increased the difference between the lighting intensities of taxiways and runways, to enable pilots to better differentiate between them under low light conditions.

Both pilots were grounded by the airline after the incident but were returned to duty after retraining.

== See also ==
- List of accidents and incidents involving commercial aircraft
- Air Canada Flight 759, a similar incident that took place in July 2017
