= 2006 Morecambe Bay Eurocopter AS365 crash =

Aviation incident in the Irish Sea

Morecambe Bay Eurocopter AS365 crash
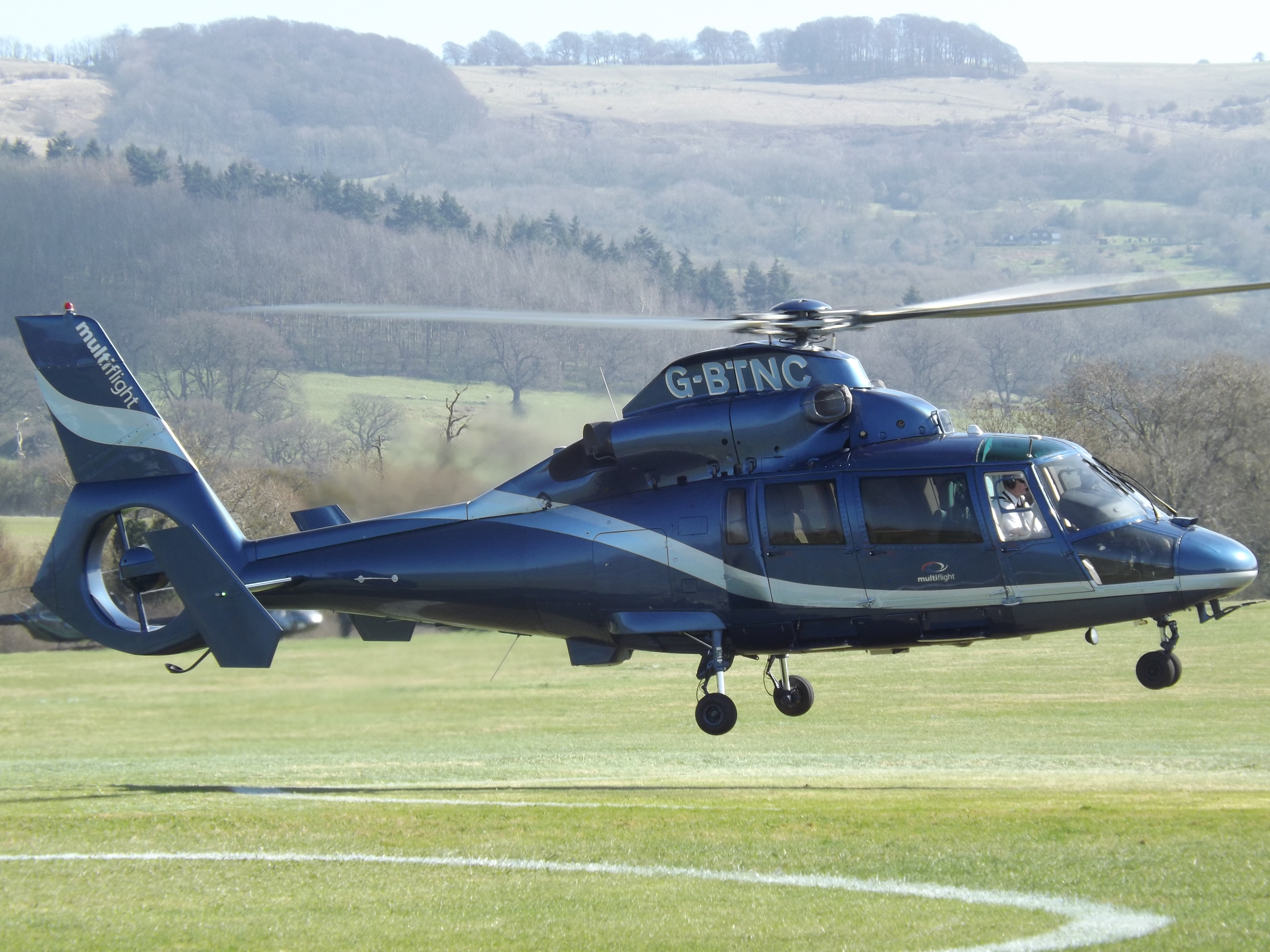
- An AS365 Dauphin similar to the accident helicopter

Accident
- Date: 27 December 2006
- Summary: Descent into sea due to pilot error
- Site: Morecambe Bay, Irish Sea; 53°57′22″N 003°40′12″W

Aircraft
- Aircraft type: Eurocopter AS365 Dauphin
- Operator: CHC Helicopter
- Registration: G-BLUN
- Flight origin: Blackpool Airport
- Destination: Morecambe Bay gas platforms
- Passengers: 5
- Crew: 2
- Fatalities: 7
- Injuries: 0
- Missing: 1
- Survivors: 0

The 2006 Morecambe Bay helicopter crash was a fatal air incident that occurred on 27 December 2006 at approximately 18:40 GMT, while remote platform (Normally Unmanned Installations) crew were being transported from the Millom West via North Morecambe gas platforms to return them to the AP1, part of the Morecambe Field's Central Complex, situated approximately 24 miles (39 km) from the shoreline of Morecambe Bay, Lancashire, England.

Rescue efforts recovered the bodies of six men, including those of the two pilots. The body of the seventh victim was never recovered.

The helicopter was a Eurocopter AS365 Dauphin, registration G-BLUN, owned by CHC Helicopter. The aircraft was contracted by Centrica, the company that manages the gas platform to which the helicopter was traveling.

Initial rescue was undertaken by an emergency response rescue vessel Highland Sprite (E.R.R.V) and her two onboard fast rescue craft, and later by Royal National Lifeboat Institution (RNLI) rescue service operating out of nearby Lytham St Annes, and was coordinated by HM Coastguard.

== Investigation ==
The investigation into the crash started the same night as the accident. The flight data recorders were recovered on 17 January 2007 after severe weather hampered earlier recovery attempts. The storms also hampered efforts to find and recover those lost in the incident. Because offshore helicopter operations are so crucial to the day-to-day running of offshore platforms, the UK Air Accidents Investigation Branch (AAIB) felt it necessary to release a preliminary bulletin as soon as possible. Special Bulletin S1/2007 stated: "The conclusion of this preliminary examination is that there are no signs of pre-impact malfunction of any major mechanical components, including the tail rotor and its drive shaft."

The formal report into the accident, released in October 2008, stated that "human factors" were the cause of the crash. The co-pilot, who was the handling pilot at the time, became disoriented in the dark night and poor weather conditions, and misjudged the approach path. He asked the commander for assistance, whereupon the commander took control of the helicopter. However, the transfer of control from co-pilot to commander was roughly four seconds after the co-pilot had initially noted that he was having difficulties but did not articulate this correctly. The report found that the transfer of control wasn't smooth enough due to the co-pilot not initially articulating his need clearly and that the commander wasn't "mentally primed to take control of the helicopter." The report concluded that:

"During the attempted recovery of the helicopter from its unusual attitude the commander was devoid of any external visual cues and was possibly distracted over concerns for the well-being of his co-pilot. Concerns for his co-pilot and some degree of disorientation possibly distracted the commander from his usual instrument scan to the extent that he did not notice the increasing angle of bank to the right and the helicopter's continuing descent into the sea."

— AAIB Report No: 7/2008
