= IAI I-View =

I-View
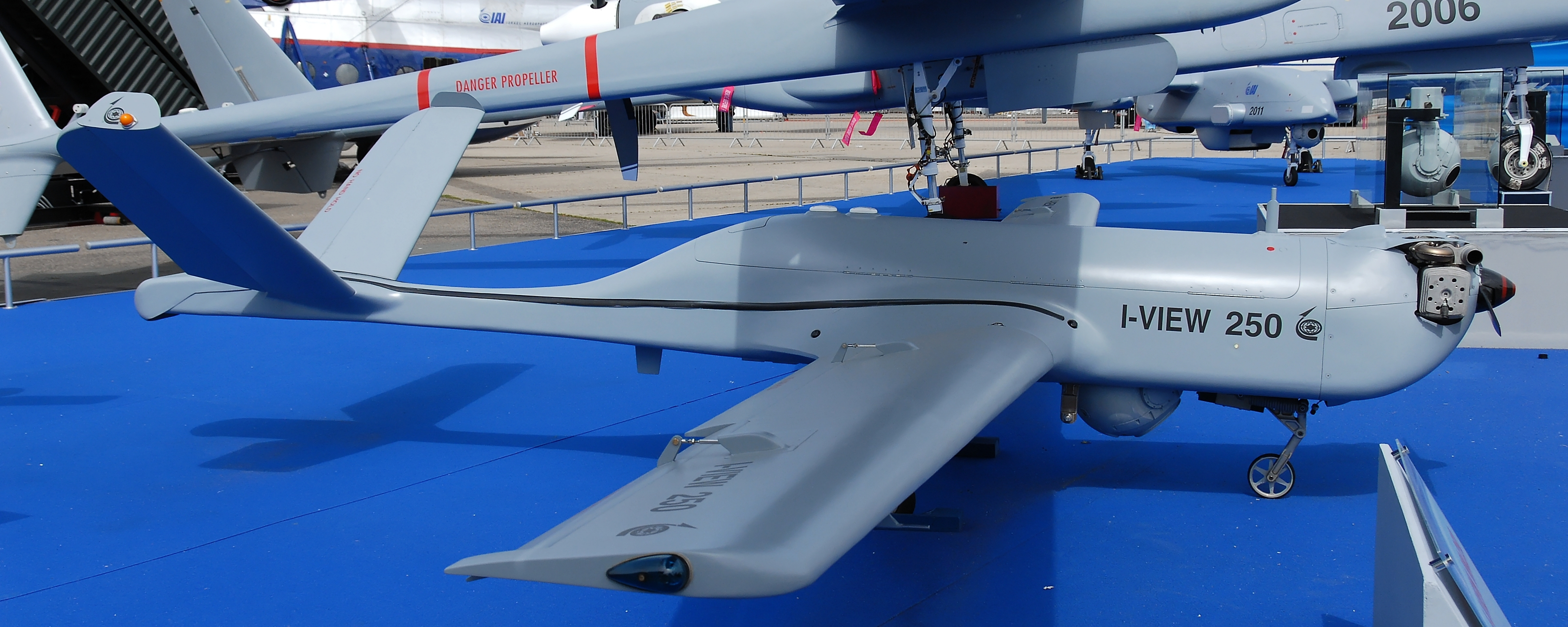
- I-View 250

General information
- Type: Reconnaissance UAV
- National origin: Israel
- Manufacturer: IAI

The IAI I-View (Eye-View in some sources) is a small reconnaissance unmanned aerial vehicle developed in Israel in the early 21st century. Like other UAVs produced by IAI, it has fixed landing gear and an 18.6 kW (25 hp) piston engine. The Eye-View is also being promoted in civilian markets for forest fire warning, and in this form is appropriately known as the FireBird.

In December 2006, the I-View was selected as the winning tender in the JP129 requirement to provide a reconnaissance UAV for the Australian Defence Force. The contract for the project was canceled in September 2008 as a result of technical problems before any UAVs were delivered.

Under a $50 million deal, signed in April, Israel Aerospace Industries (IAI) will supply Russia with some of its second-tier UAVs, including the Bird-Eye 400 mini-UAV, the I-view MK150 tactical UAV and the Searcher Mk II medium-range UAV. This is the first Israeli sale of military platforms to Russia.

== Specifications ==
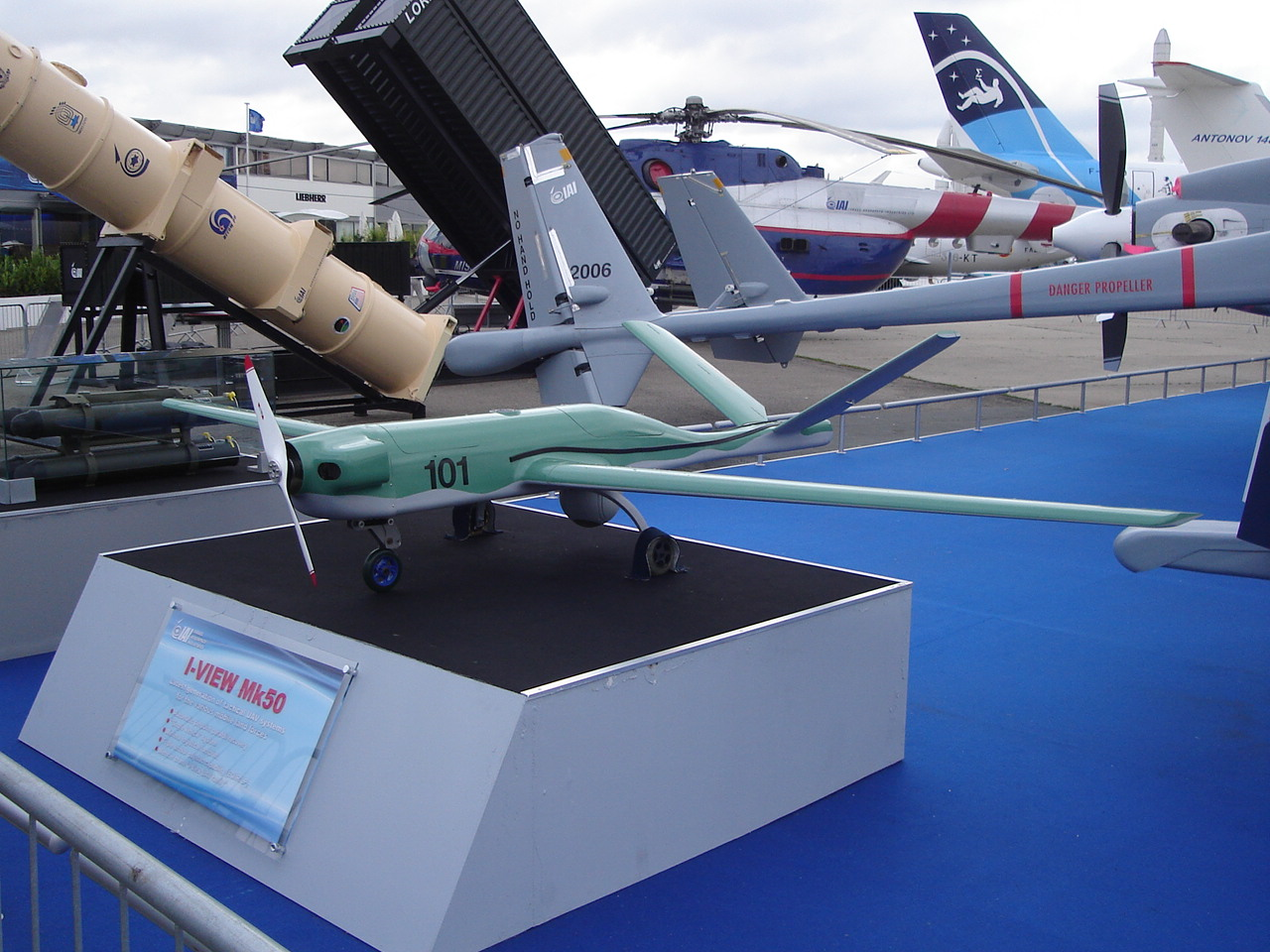
I-View 50

General characteristics

- Crew: none
- Capacity: 14 kg (30 lb) payload
- Length: 2.90 m (9 ft 6 in)
- Wingspan: 3.96 m (13 ft 0 in)
- Gross weight: 104 kg (230 lb)
- Powerplant: 1 × Dale DH-290 , 19 kW (25 hp)

Performance

- Maximum speed: 185 km/h (115 mph, 100 kn)
- Endurance: >6 hours
- Service ceiling: 1,500 m (5,000 ft)

== Operators ==
Russia
8 systems purchased by Russia.
