= 2006 Falsterbo Swedish Coast Guard C-212 crash =

Aviation accident in Sweden

Coordinates: 55.4°N 12.95°E

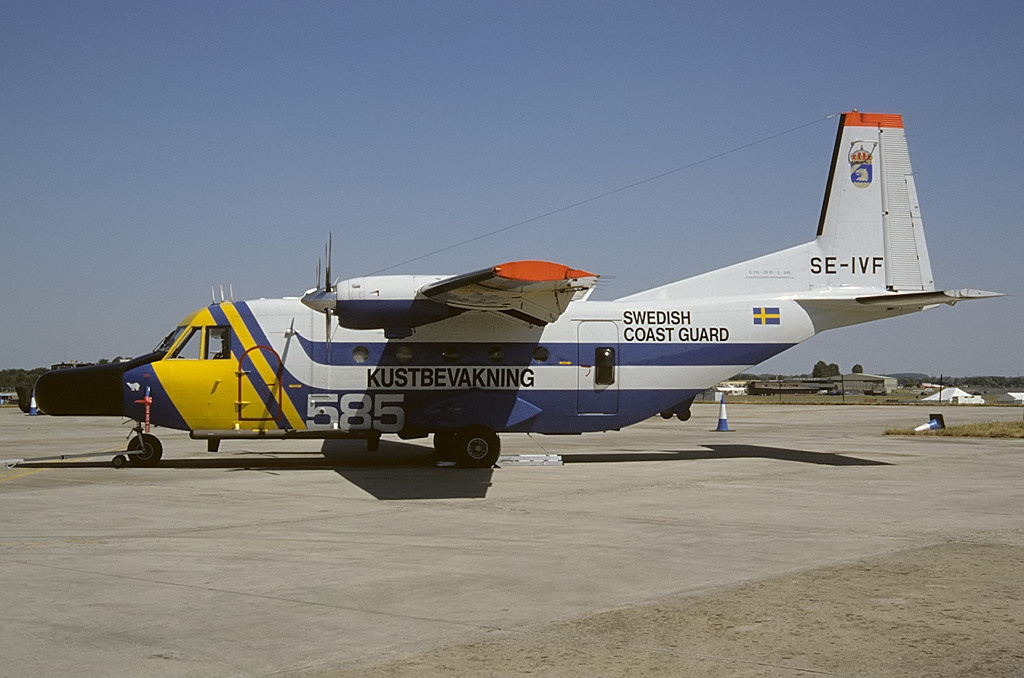
- SE-IVF, the aircraft involved in the incident, seen in 1996

Accident
- Date: 26 October 2006
- Summary: Wing failure caused by metal fatigue
- Site: Northern basin of Falsterbo canal, Sweden

Aircraft
- Aircraft type: CASA C-212 Aviocar
- Operator: Swedish Coast Guard
- Registration: SE-IVF
- Flight origin: Ronneby Airport, Sweden
- Destination: Malmö Airport, Sweden
- Occupants: 4
- Crew: 4
- Fatalities: 4
- Survivors: 0

On 26 October 2006, a CASA C-212 Aviocar aircraft of the Swedish Coast Guard crashed into the Falsterbo Canal, Sweden.

== Accident ==
The accident aircraft was performing a low-level fly-by of the Skanör-Falsterbo Coast Guard Station while en route from Ronneby Airport to Malmö Airport.

The accident was observed by a group of schoolchildren who reported that the port wing fell off during a turn, making the aircraft fall into the sea. All four crewmembers died. The wreckage was subsequently recovered.

The Swedish Coast Guard grounded its remaining fleet of CASA C-212s within days after the accident. The remaining aircraft were sold to Uruguay.

== Cause ==
The Swedish Accident Investigation Board determined the cause to be metal fatigue. The Swedish Coast Guard later replaced the aircraft with Bombardier Dash-8 Q300s because the remaining two aircraft were found to have the same issue.
