= EasyJet Flight 6074 =

2006 aviation incident over France

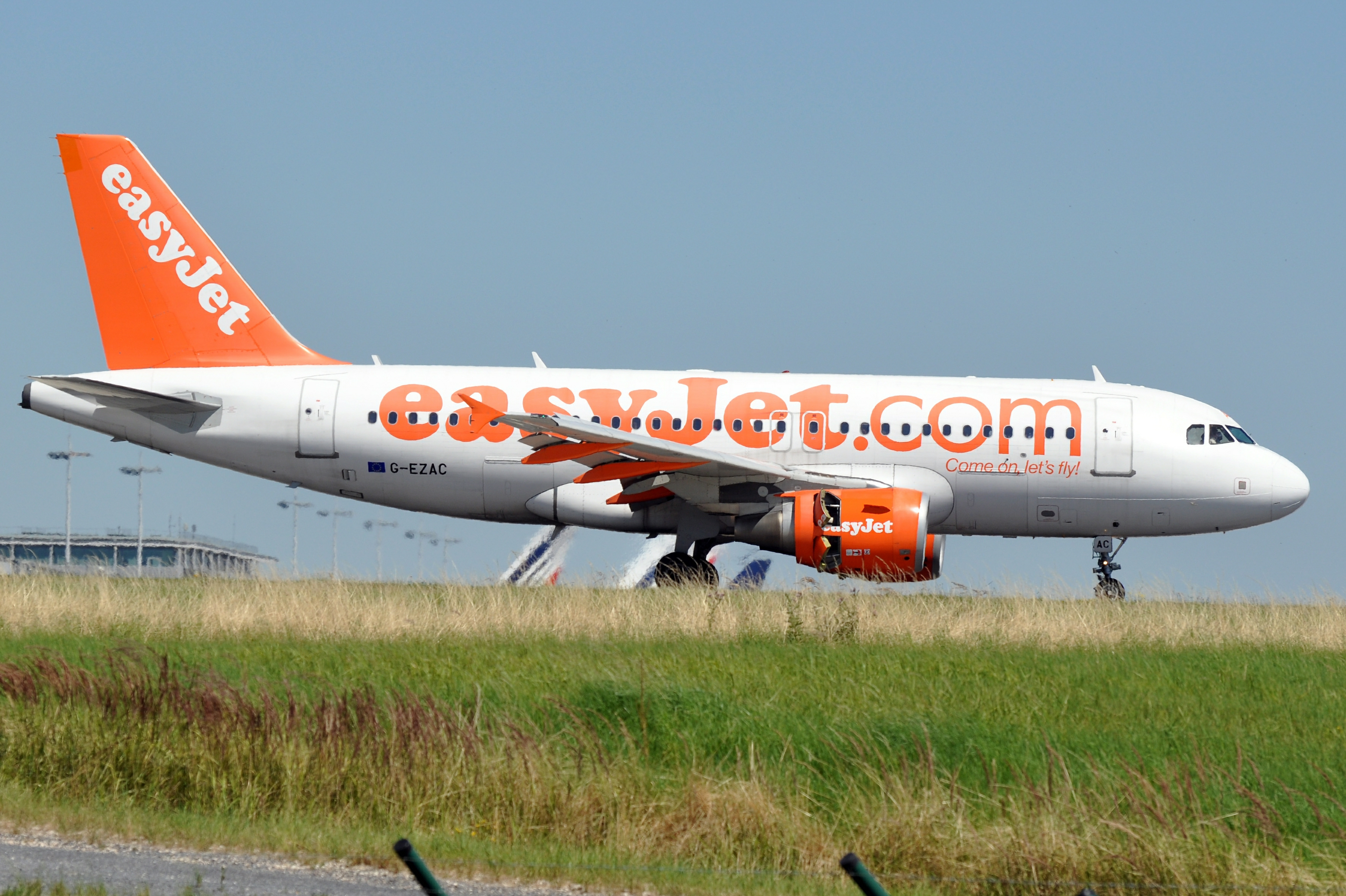
- G-EZAC, the aircraft involved in the incident, pictured in 2012

Incident
- Date: 15 September 2006
- Summary: Major electrical failure
- Site: Near Nantes, France

Aircraft
- Aircraft type: Airbus A319-111
- Operator: EasyJet
- IATA flight No.: U26074
- ICAO flight No.: EZY6074
- Call sign: EASY 6074
- Registration: G-EZAC
- Flight origin: Alicante-Elche Miguel Hernández Airport, Alicante, Spain
- Destination: Bristol Airport, North Somerset, United Kingdom
- Occupants: 144
- Passengers: 138
- Crew: 6
- Fatalities: 0
- Survivors: 144

EasyJet Flight 6074 was a scheduled flight on 15 September 2006 from Alicante, Spain, to Bristol, United Kingdom, on an Airbus A319. The flight suffered severe electrical failures during its flight and, as a result, it nearly collided with an American Airlines Boeing 777. The pilots continued their flight to Bristol and executed a successful emergency landing saving all 144 occupants onboard.

== Aircraft ==
The aircraft involved was an Airbus A319-111, MSN 2691, registered as G-EZAC, which was manufactured by Airbus Industrie in 2006. It had logged 1,962 airframe hours and 1,428 takeoff and landing cycles and was powered by two CFM International CFM56-5B5/P engines.

== Incident ==
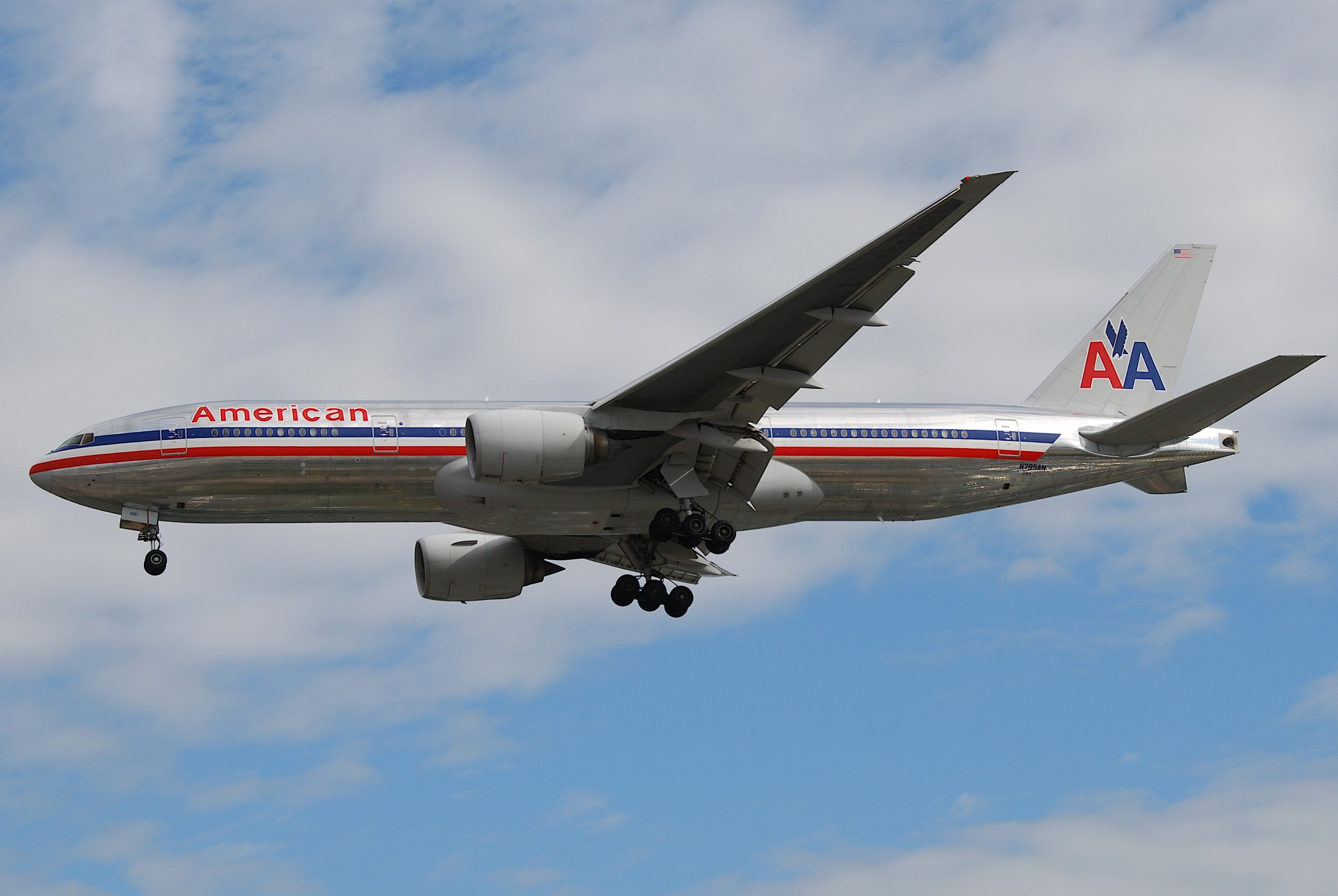
An American Airlines Boeing 777-200ER similar to the one involved

On 15 September 2006, about 85 minutes into the flight, EasyJet Flight 6074 experienced a major electrical failure in its systems near Nantes, France, while cruising at 32,000 feet. Multiple systems became inoperative, including the aircraft's radios, autopilot, electronic centralised aircraft monitor, the captain's electronic flight instrument display, and traffic collision avoidance system (TCAS). As a consequence of these failures, the A319 nearly collided with American Airlines Flight AAL63, a Boeing 777-223ER. The transponder was also knocked out, making the air traffic controller (ATC) unable to track the aircraft. Ten minutes before a shift change, the ATC noticed that Flight 6074 had disappeared from radar. The ATC quickly asked the pilots of a nearby aircraft, American Airlines Flight 63, to descend to 31,000 feet to avoid a potential collision with the EasyJet aircraft and if they could see it in their TCAS, but AAL63 replied negative. After the ATC shift change, the new controller again commanded Flight 63 to descend to 31,000 feet. At 11:01:17 local time, Flight 63 then began its descent. A few moments later, Flight 63 reported spotting an "EasyJet 737" flying overhead, undetected by the TCAS. Moments later, the pilots of EasyJet Flight 6074 managed to reconfigure their transponder and then a minute later, their squawk code changed to the number 7700, or the General Emergency code number. Before landing, several attempts were made to contact the ATC using mobile phones without success. The crew was unable to reconfigure the majority of the aircraft's electrical systems and continued on to land uneventfully at Bristol Airport without any further communication with air traffic control or restoration of the affected systems.

== Investigation ==
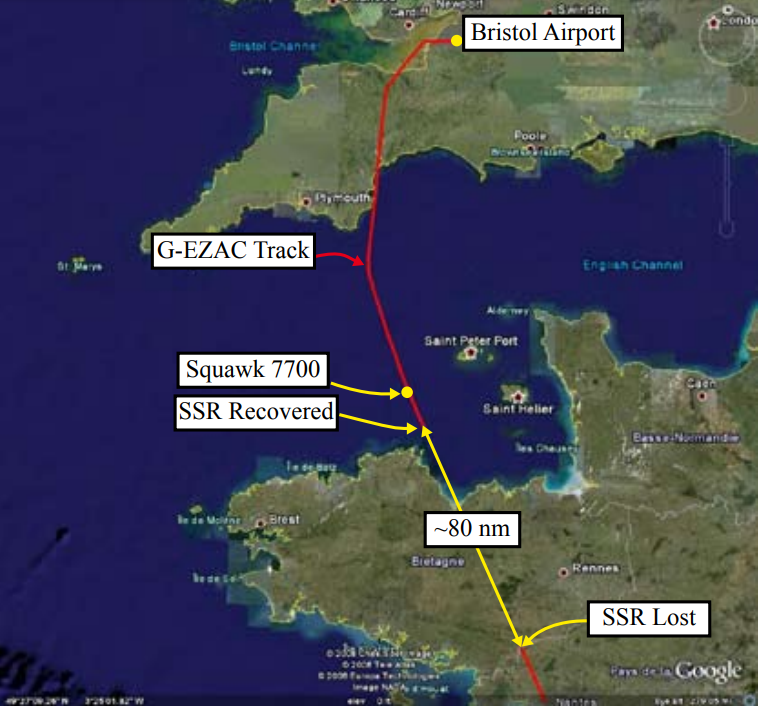
The flight path of Flight 6074

An investigation commenced shortly after the Air Accidents Investigation Branch (AAIB) was informed of the incident at 14:52 local time. As the aircraft was manufactured and designed in France, an accredited representative from the Bureau of Enquiry and Analysis for Civil Aviation Safety was appointed. Airbus also assisted in the investigation.

According to the analysis, EasyJet Flight 6074 intersected with American Airlines Flight 63 at a distance of 2.86 nautical miles (3.3 miles) directly ahead, with American Airlines Flight 63 being 600 feet below the EasyJet flight, which was still cruising at 32,000 feet. At 11:02:16 local time, American Airlines Flight 63 continued its descent and reached the point where the two aircraft tracks intersected, at approximately 31,000 feet, 19 seconds after EasyJet Flight 6074 had passed. At that moment, EZY6074 was 2.67 nm (3.07 miles) east of AAL63. This marked the closest recorded separation between the two aircraft. The TCAS did not sound on either aircraft due to the TCAS being disabled on the EasyJet aircraft as a result of the electrical failure. For the TCAS to work, both aircraft need to have it activated.

== Aftermath ==
The crew reports, the Post Flight Report (generated by the Centralised Fault Display System), and the recorded data all indicate that the incident occurred due to the AC BUS 1 losing power. AC BUS 1 is a crucial electrical bus that distributes alternating current (AC) power to various systems and components on the aircraft. It is an essential part of the aircraft's electrical system, providing power for critical in-flight functions. The investigation examined Trouble Shooting Data automatically recorded by the Generator Control Unit (GCU) for the electrical generator on the left engine. This indicated that this loss of power was caused by the offline tripping of that generator, and this was due to the GCU activating a protective function (the "Welded GLC Protection function") intended to deal with the situation where a generator needs to be disconnected but the appropriate switchgear (the Generator Line Contactor) has failed to open.

As for the aircraft involved, G-EZAC, it was repaired and returned to service. It remained with EasyJet until 2020 when it was withdrawn from service. It was going to be re-registered N6308U and delivered to United Airlines, but the jet was not taken up. It was subsequently moved to Phoenix Goodyear Airport, where it will be scrapped.

== See also ==
- Air Illinois Flight 710
- United Air Lines Flight 266
- Aeroflot Flight 909
