= DAC RangeR =

Dutch homebuilt aircraft

RangeR

General information
- Type: Amateur-built aircraft
- National origin: Netherlands
- Manufacturer: Dutch Aeroplane Company
- Status: Production completed (2015)

History
- Manufactured: 2006-2015
- First flight: 15 September 2006
- Developed from: Lucas Dieselis

The DAC RangeR is a Dutch amateur-built aircraft, that was designed and produced by the Dutch Aeroplane Company (DAC), of Dordrecht. When it was available the aircraft was supplied as a kit for amateur construction.

== Design and development ==
The RangeR is a development of the Lucas Dieselis and features a cantilever low-wing, a two-seats-in-side-by-side configuration enclosed cockpit under a bubble canopy, fixed tricycle landing gear and a single engine in tractor configuration.

The aircraft is made from composite sandwiches. Its 9.75 m (32.0 ft) span wing has an area of 10.24 m^{2} (110.2 sq ft) and flaps. The standard powerplant available is the 95 hp (71 kW) DAC YDT 1.7 litre diesel engine, developed by the airframe designers and based upon an Isuzu design.

By 2015 the aircraft had gone through a redesign, with an enlarged cockpit and a new wing design by Martin Holloman added, but by the end of 2015 the company website was taken down and the company seemed to be out of business.

== Specifications (RangeR) ==
Data from Bayerl and DAC

General characteristics

- Crew: one
- Capacity: one passenger
- Length: 5.870 m (19 ft 3 in)
- Wing area: 10.24 m^{2} (110.2 sq ft)
- Empty weight: 500 kg (1,102 lb)
- Gross weight: 750 kg (1,653 lb)
- Fuel capacity: 90 litres (20 imp gal; 24 US gal)
- Powerplant: 1 × DAC YDT 1.7 litre diesel engine, 71 kW (95 hp)
- Propellers: 2-bladed composite

Performance

- Maximum speed: 235 km/h (146 mph, 127 kn)
- Cruise speed: 182 km/h (113 mph, 98 kn)
- Stall speed: 100 km/h (62 mph, 54 kn)
- Rate of climb: 3.5 m/s (690 ft/min)
- Wing loading: 73.2 kg/m^{2} (15.0 lb/sq ft)
