= Falsterbo Canal =

Canal in southern Sweden

Coordinates: 55°24′N 12°57′E

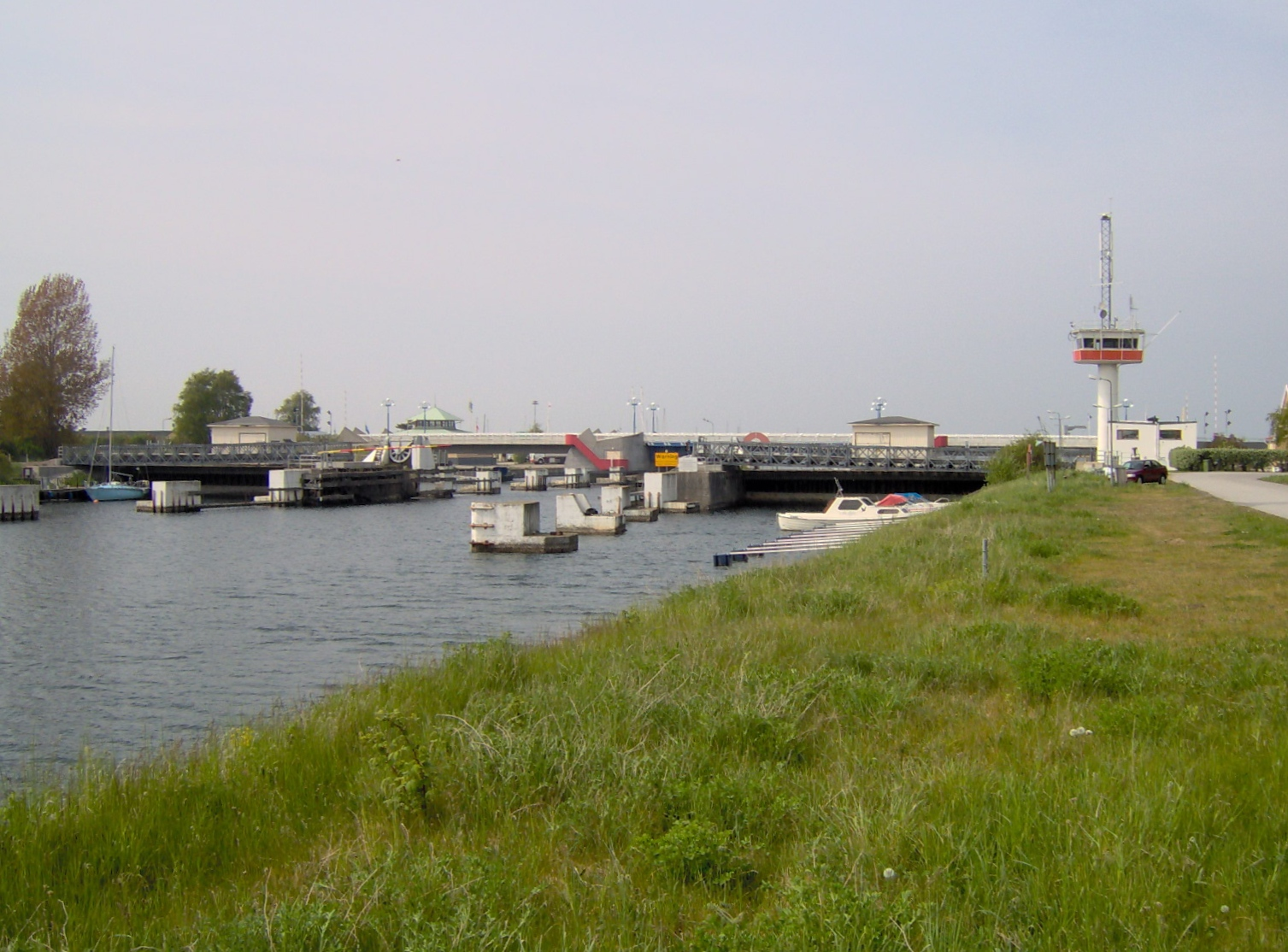
Bridge over the canal

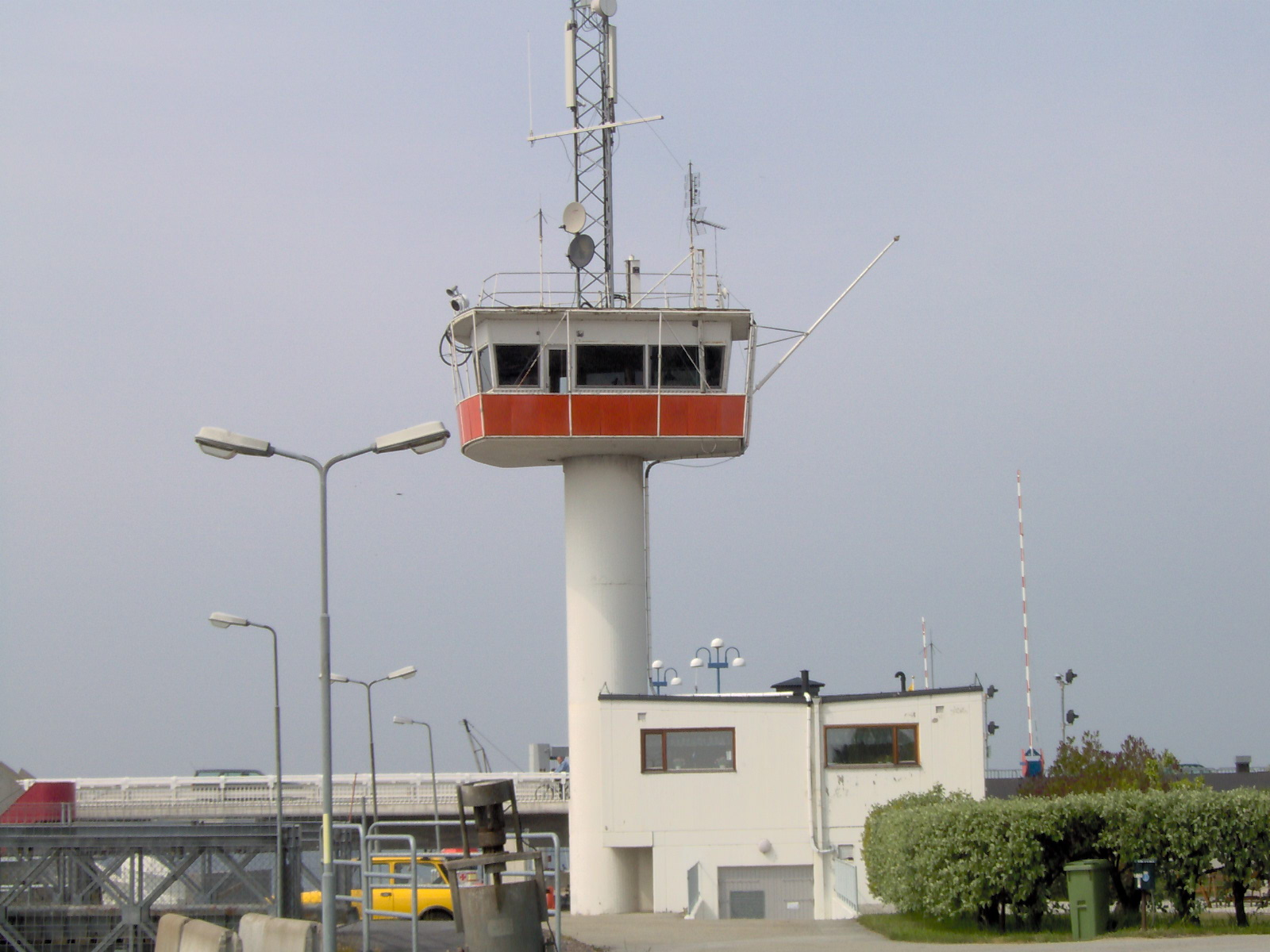
Control tower at Falsterbo

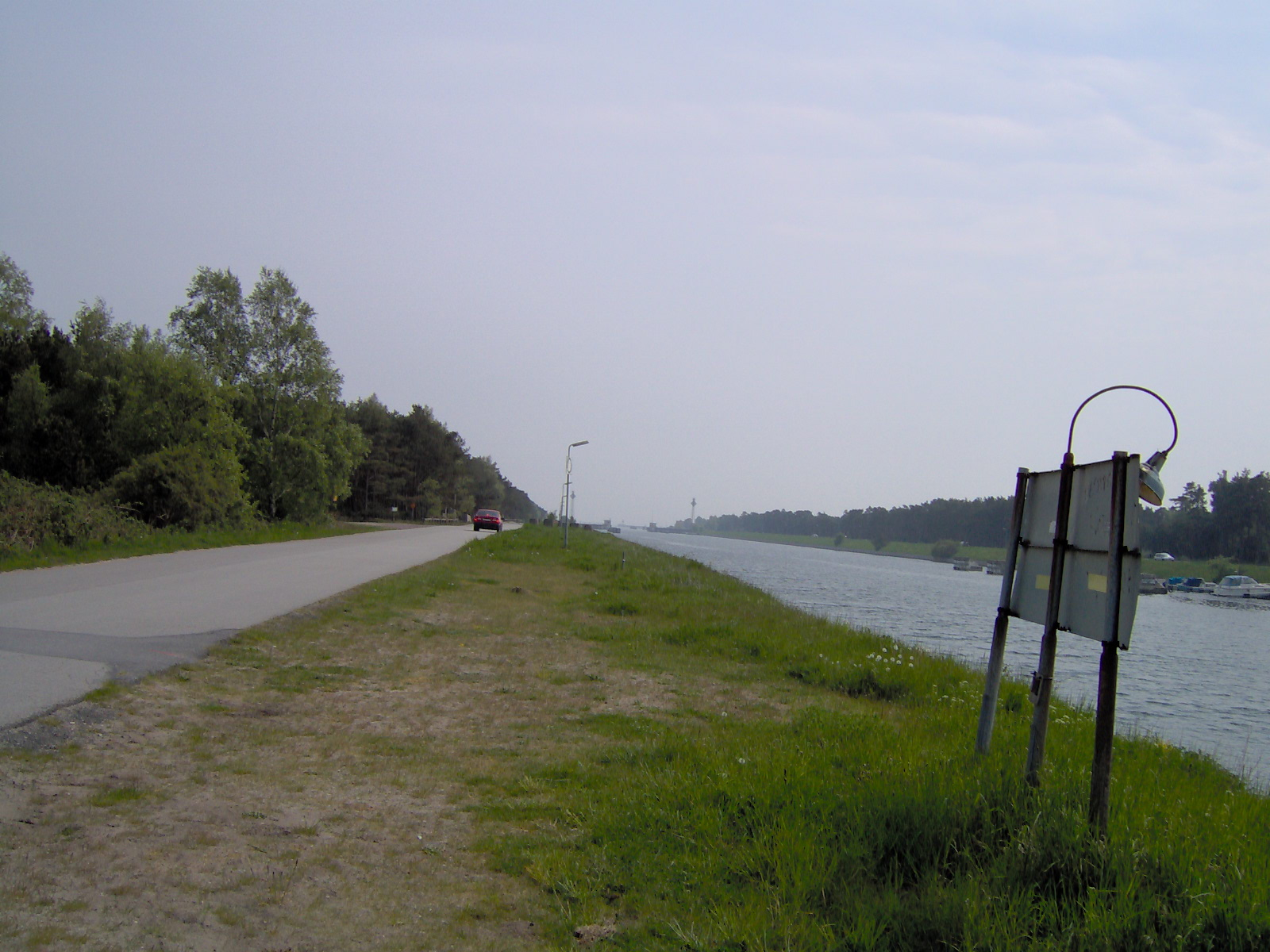
Canal at the Baltic

Falsterbo Canal (Swedish: Falsterbokanalen) is a short canal that allows ships to pass inside Falsterbo, Skanör and Ljunghusen from the Baltic to the Öresund. Falsterbo, Skanör and Ljunghusen lie on the Skanör-Falsterbo peninsula (now essentially an island which is called "Näset").

During the Second World War when the Germans mined extensively outside Falsterbonäset at the Falsterborev (Falsterbo reef) in 1939, Sweden concluded that a canal was needed between Höllviken and Ljunghusen to allow safe passage of coastal traffic. The canal was completed, allowing ship passage on 1 August 1941.

There had been previous attempts at canals in this location; in 1884 Mårten Dahn proposed to the Parliament of Sweden that he would build a canal to allow ships to pass here. In 1896 fishermen in Skanör actually began to construct a canal here, but gave up because of the difficulty of the task.

The canal contains a sluice that can shut to prevent high currents through the canal when the difference in water level between the seas is large. On the north mouth of the canal there is a harbour which is well suited for small boats. Today no heavy traffic passes through the canal and it is practically a passage and harbour for small craft.

In earlier times the bridge over the canal opened upon demand at the judgment of the canal master, but in later years it is only opened following a fixed schedule.

During the Second World War, the canal was at times used by Danes fleeing to Sweden. The ferry between Copenhagen and Rønne on the Danish island Bornholm passed through the canal, and while waiting at the sluice, people would use the opportunity to jump to safety on Swedish territory.

On 26 October 2006, a plane operating by the Swedish Coast Guard crashed in the canal. All 4 people on board were killed. The remaining CASA C-212 were grounded and sold to Uruguay.
