= BAE Systems Skylynx II =

Type of aircraft

The BAE Systems Skylynx II is an unmanned aerial vehicle (UAV) developed to support US Marine Corps Tier II regiment-level reconnaissance, surveillance and target acquisition missions. The aircraft flew its maiden flight on August 9, 2006, at the Yuma Proving Grounds, Yuma, Arizona. The Skylynx II is equipped with an electro-optical (EO) and infrared imaging system, and during test flights it was able to locate and track human and vehicle targets. Powered by a UAV Engines UEL-741 engine driving a single propeller, the aircraft is designed to be launched without a runway, and to carry payloads of up to 70 lb (32 kg).

The Skylynx II aircraft is part of an integrated unmanned aerial system that is made up of three aircraft, launcher, ground control station and remote receiver terminal. The system is designed to be operated by six Marines. The entire package can be transported to battlefield sites by two CH-46 Sea Knights or two HMMWVs.
