= Civil Aviation Safety Bureau of Hungary =

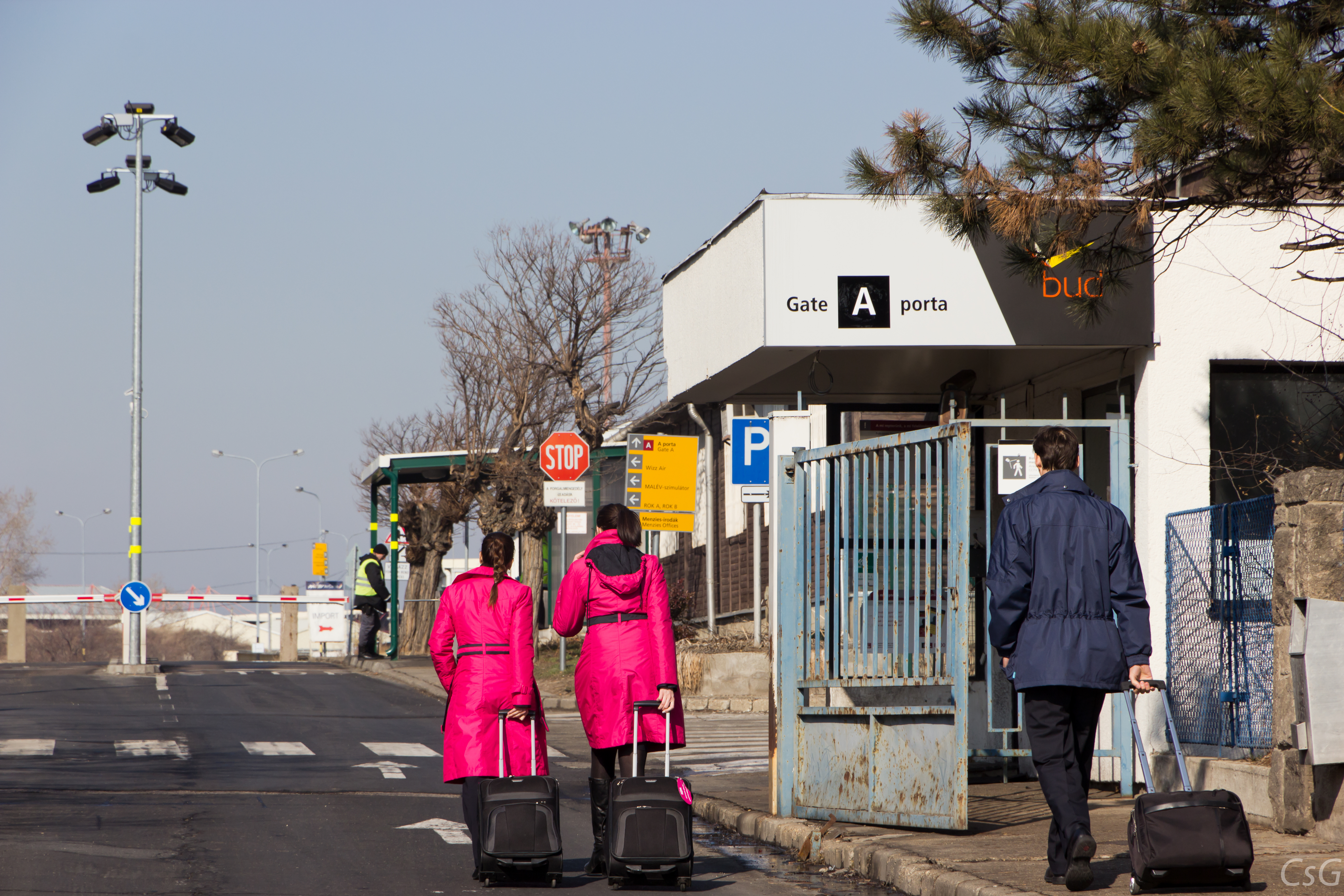
Gate A at Budapest Airport leads to where the CASB had its head office

The Civil Aviation Safety Board or the Civil Aviation Safety Bureau (CASB, Hungarian: Polgári Légiközlekedés Biztonsági Szervezet, POLÉBISZ or PoLéBiSz) was an agency of the government of Hungary. It served as the country's aviation accident investigation agency for four years, when it investigated over five hundred aircraft accidents and incidents. It had its headquarters at Building 13, Budapest Ferihegy International Airport Terminal 1 in Budapest.

The Minister for Economy and Transport created the agency that succeeded the CASB, the Transportation Safety Bureau, on 1 February 2006.

== See also ==
- Civil Aviation Authority (Hungary)
