= National Transport Authority (Hungary) =

The National Transport Authority (Nemzeti Közlekedési Hatóság, NKH) is an agency of the government of Hungary. Its head office is in Budapest.

The agency, which governs air, road, railway, and water transport, began operations on 1 January 2007. It had replaced the General Inspectorate of Transport, the Central Inspectorate for Transport, the Local Transport Inspectorates in the counties of Hungary, and the Civil Aviation Authority. The Transportation Safety Bureau is the agency that investigates transport accidents and incidents.

== Divisions ==
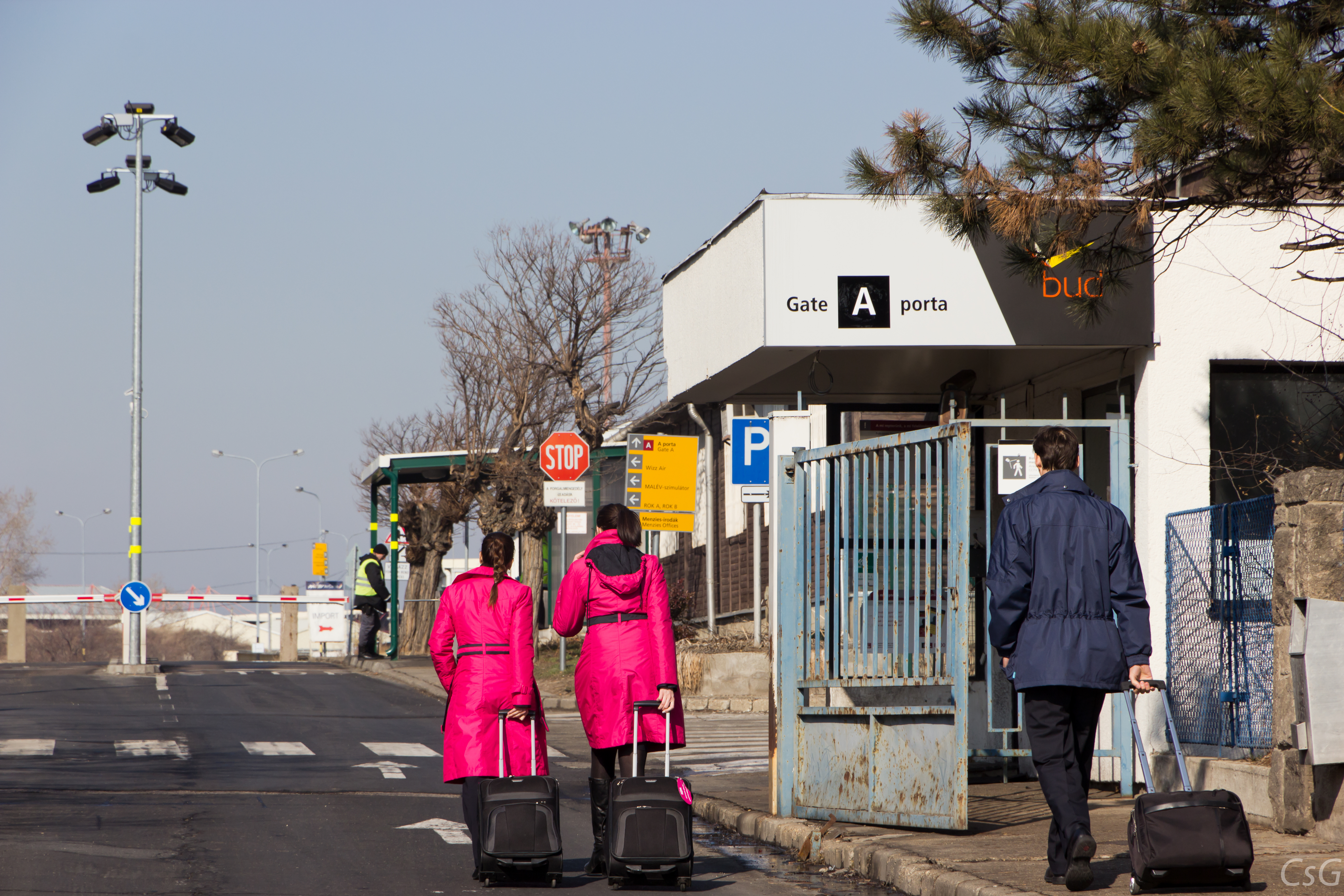
Gate A at Budapest Airport leads to the NKH's Directorate for Air Transport head office

The Aviation Authority (Hungarian: Légügyi Hivatal) governs commercial and state aviation. It has its head office at Quadrum office building at Vecsés, near to Budapest Ferenc Liszt International Airport Terminal 2.

The Department of Railway Regulation governs railways. Its head office is in the 6th district of Budapest.

The Directorate of High Priority Affairs, Department for Shipping Proceedings governs water transport. Its head office is in the Budapest facility with the railway department.
