= Swedish Coast Guard =

Swedish government agency

Swedish Coast Guard Kustbevakningen
- Coat of arms for the Swedish Coast Guard

- Racing stripe
- Abbreviation: KBV

Agency overview
- Formed: 1988
- Preceding agency: Generaltullstyrelsen

Jurisdictional structure
- Operations jurisdiction: Sweden
- Specialist jurisdiction: Coastal patrol, marine border protection, marine search and rescue

Operational structure
- Headquarters: Karlskrona, Blekinge County
- Elected officer responsible: Minister for Defence
- Agency executive: Judith Melin, Director General
- Parent agency: Ministry of Defence

Website
- www.kustbevakningen.se

The Swedish Coast Guard (Swedish: Kustbevakningen) is a Swedish civilian government agency tasked with:

- maritime surveillance and other control and inspection tasks as well as environmental cleanup after oil spills at sea.
- co-ordinate the civilian needs for maritime surveillance and maritime information.
- follow international development within the field and take part in international efforts to establish border controls, law enforcement at sea, environmental protection at sea and other maritime surveillance tasks.

The Swedish Coast Guard carries out some of its surveillance by air (from its base at Skavsta Airport south-west of Stockholm), and in the winter-time by hovercraft and snowmobiles on the ice-covered waters of the Bothnian Bay from its Luleå station. The Coast Guard also has regular maritime duties in Vänern, Europe's third largest lake, operating out of Vänersborg.

== History ==
In January 2025, the Swedish Government tasked the Coast Guard and the Swedish Armed Forces with expanding their cooperation to enhance security and surveillance in the Baltic Sea. Under the directive, the Coast Guard's role was reconfigured to provide formal support to total defence during periods of heightened alert and war, while maintaining its status as a civilian agency without combat tasks.

As part of this transition, the agency began arming its personnel and fleet in 2026. Coast Guard officers were issued Ak 24 assault rifles and enhanced protective equipment, while patrol vessels were fitted with Ksp 58 machine guns. The measure was intended to strengthen the protection of critical subsea infrastructure and address potential threats in the Baltic Sea, such as drone attacks.

== Organization ==
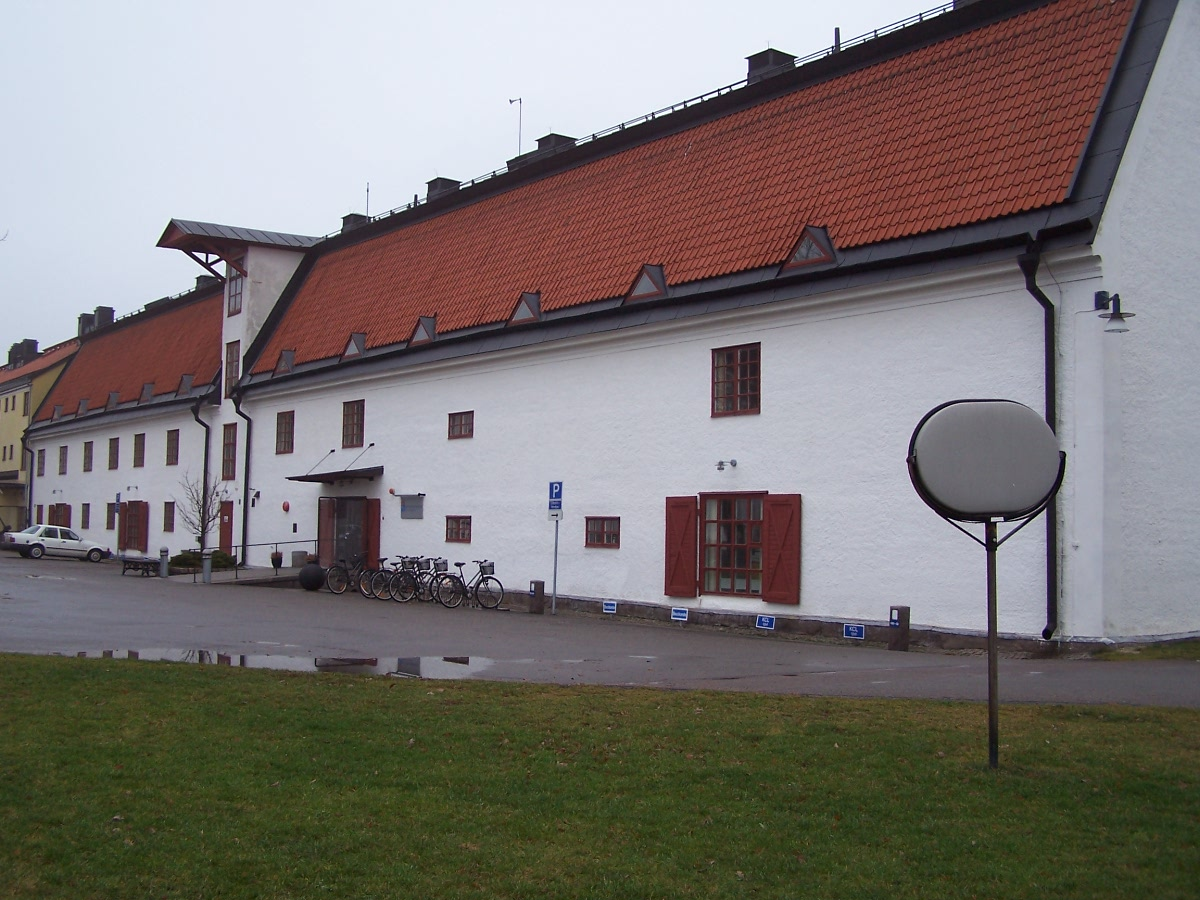
Headquarters of the Swedish Coast Guard in Karlskrona.

The Coast Guard has 26 coastal stations, including an aviation coastal station. The stations fall under four regional areas; with the regional headquarters located in Härnösand, Stockholm, Gothenburg, and Karlskrona respectively. The four management centers control the daily operational activities.

The national operational control is co-located with the Swedish Maritime Administration, which is responsible for the Swedish Joint Rescue Co-ordination Centre (JRCC), and the Swedish navy at Kärringberget navalbase in Gothenburg.

The Coast Guard's central headquarters is located in the historic 17th century naval city of Karlskrona, which is a UNESCO World Heritage Site.

The total number of Coast Guard employees across the country amounts to around 800.

== Coast Guard vessels ==
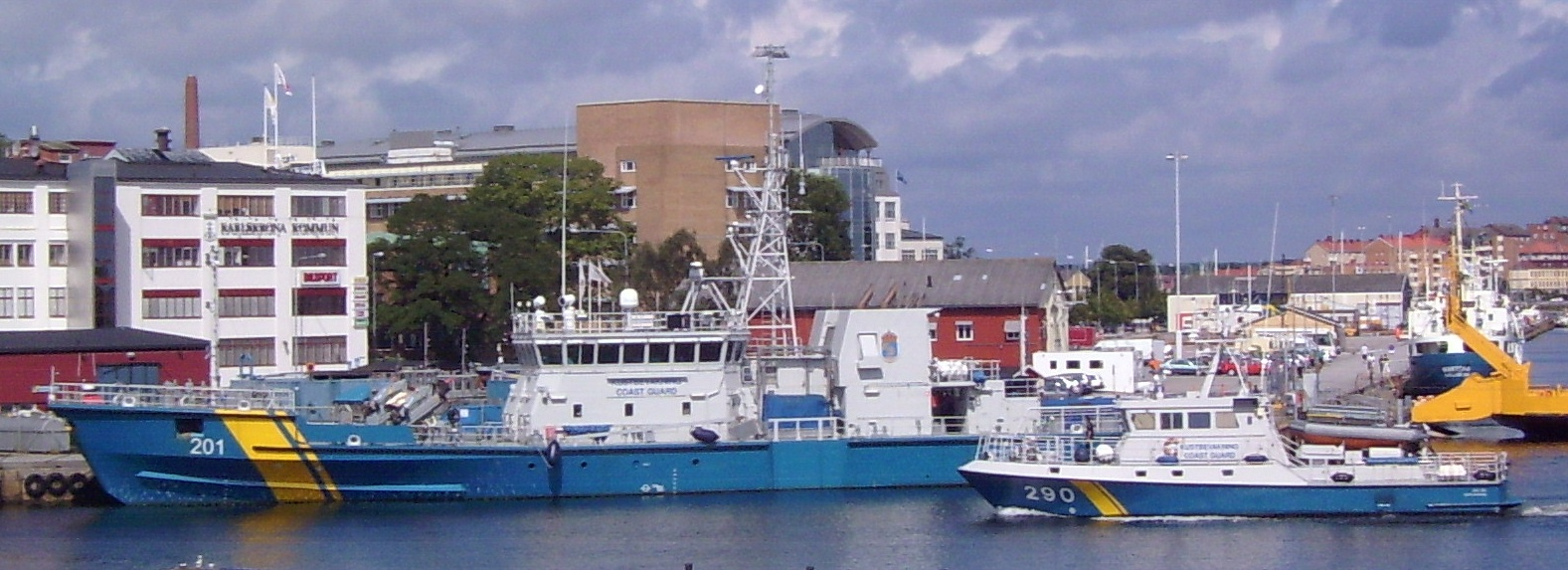
Ships of the Swedish Coastguard in Karlskrona

=== Multipurpose ships ===
The Coast Guard currently has 10 ships which combine the characteristics of both environmental protection vessels and surveillance ships, as well as emergency tow ships.

=== Maritime surveillance ships ===
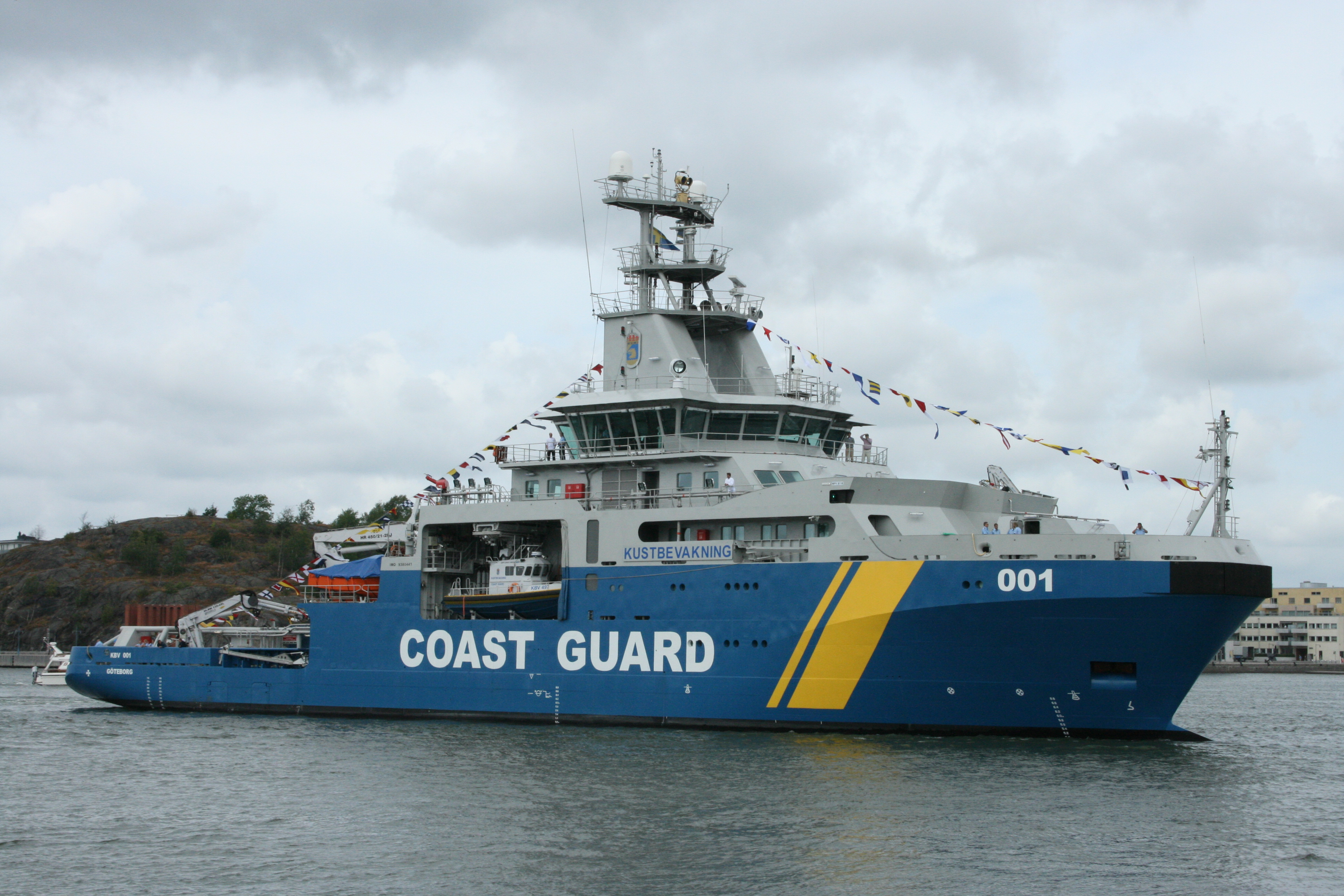
Swedish Coast Guard Multi Purpose Vessel KBV 001 Poseidon

The Coast Guard currently has 16 maritime surveillance ships which are used mainly for patrolling with some also given oil spill response capacity.

=== Environmental protection vessels ===
The Coast Guard currently has 5 environmental protection vessels primarily used for oil spill response, and secondly for patrolling.

=== Hovercraft ===
The Coast Guard operates five hovercraft mainly in northern Sweden where they can easily travel over both ice, water and land. KBV 593 based in Luleå, KBV 592 based in Umeå, KBV 591 based in Örnsköldsvik, KBV 594 KBV based in Vaxholm, and 595.

=== Barges ===
The Coast Guard maintains one large barge, KBV 866 in Härnösand, used for the storage of absorbed oil from spills.

=== Boats ===
The Coast Guard currently has over 100 boats. Some boats are used as a complement to larger ships, while others operate as separate entities. The boats are divided into four groups: High Speed/Go Fast, rib-boats, dinghies and work boats.

=== Personal equipment ===
- Glock 17 Gen 3 9×19mm pistol
- Automatkarbin 24

== Coast Guard aviation ==
Swedish Coast Guard
IATA	ICAO	Call sign
–	KBV	Swecoast

The Coast Guard has three Bombardier Dash 8 Q-300 aircraft numbered KBV 501, 502 and 503. The Dash 8 Maritime Surveillance Aircraft were modified by Field Aviation in Toronto, Canada. The Coast Guard Aviation Home base is Skavsta Airport in Nyköping. Surveillance and reconnaissance flights are conducted along the Swedish coast and Vänern year-round, day and night. Additional regular international assignments are also flown as needed.

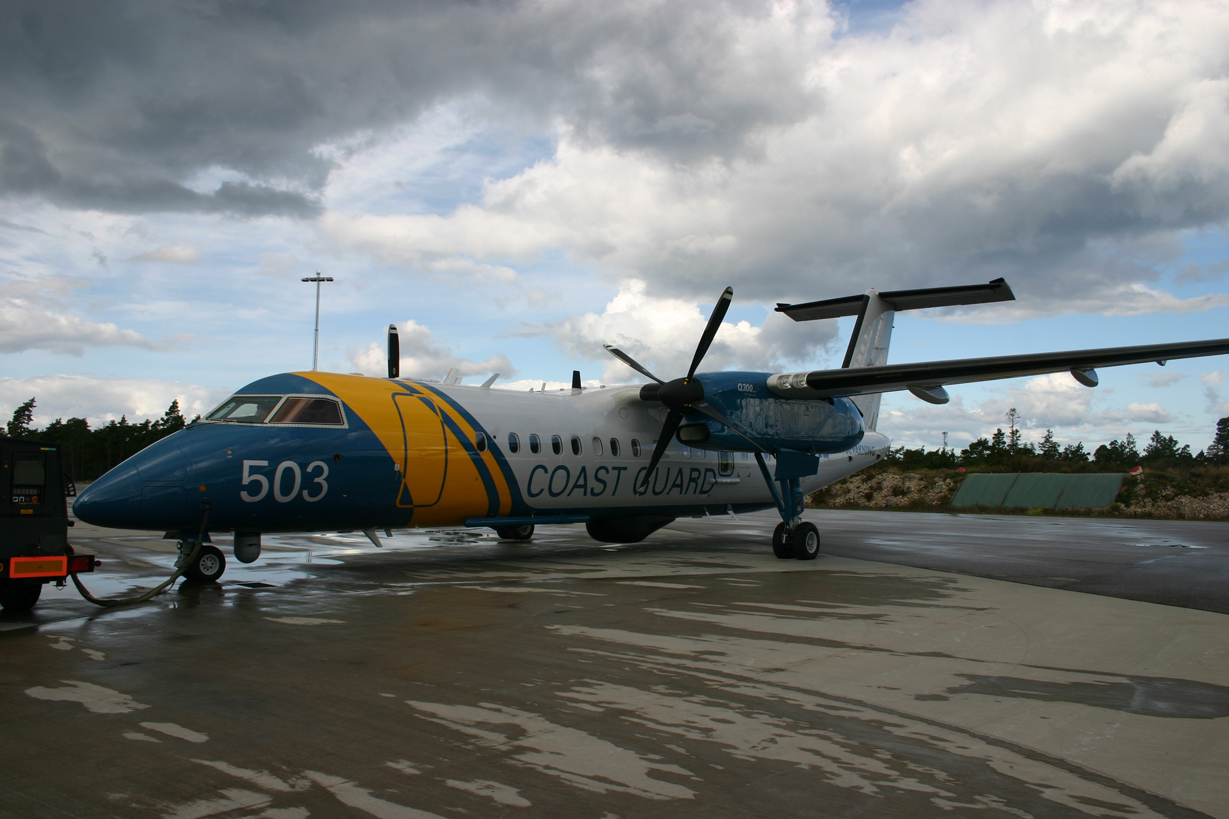
Swedish Coast Guard Bombardier Dash 8 Q-300 KBV503

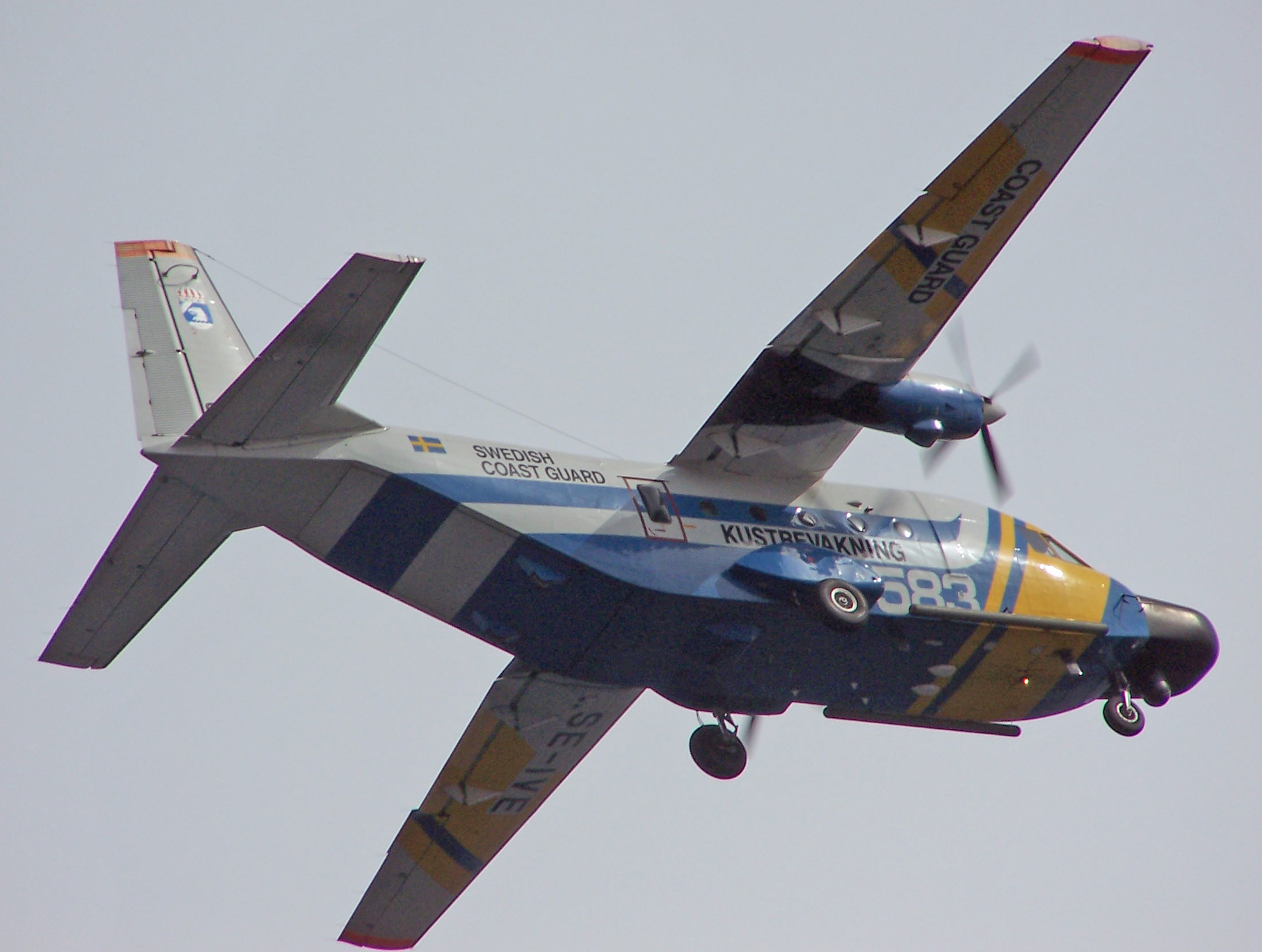
Former CASA C-212 of the Swedish Coast Guard.

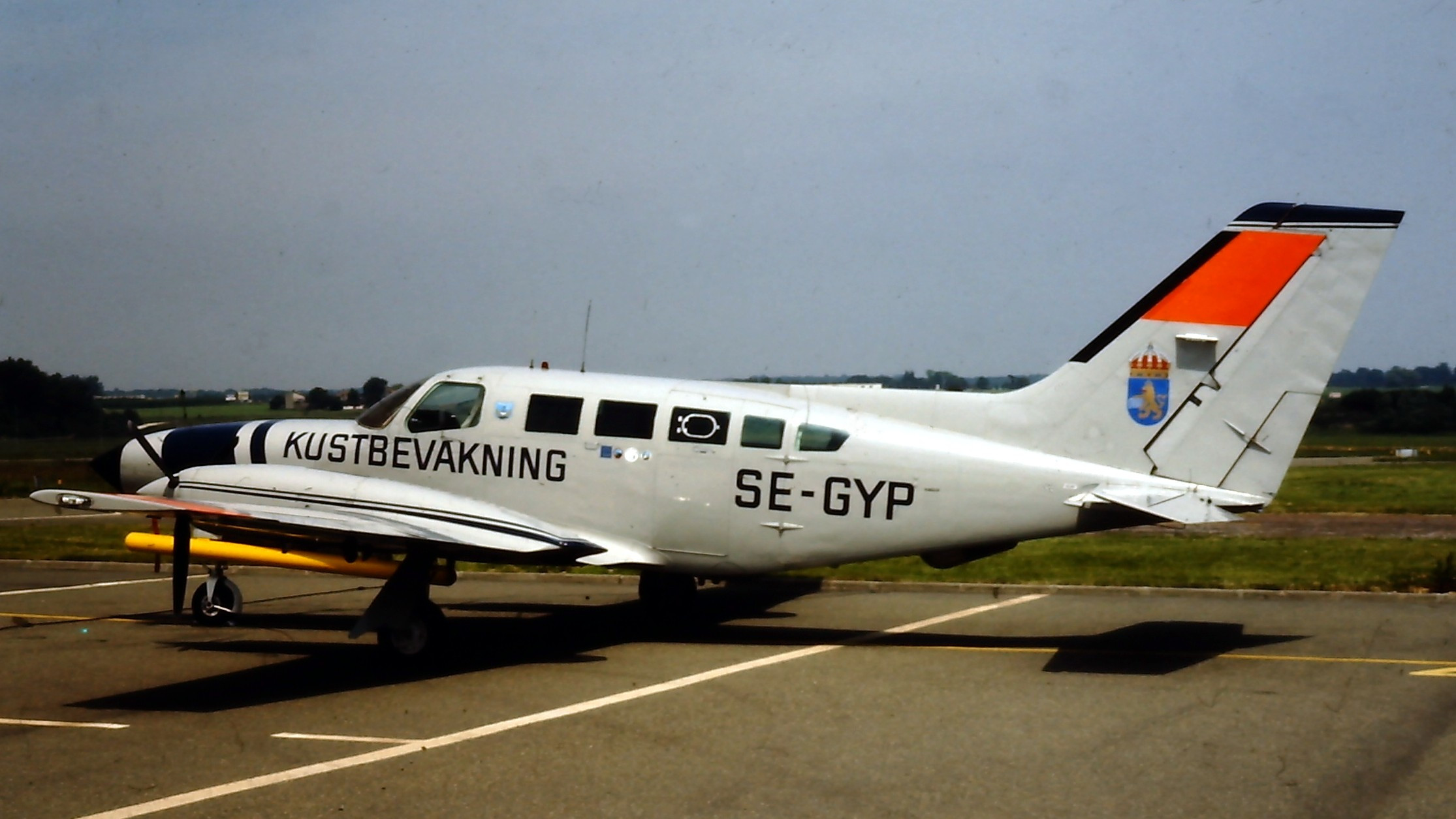
Former Cessna 402C in 1981

The division operate their flights as VFR and use VFR flight rules throughout the majority of their flights. Some flights, either operating/ferrying internationally or for longer distances, fly using IFR rules.

== Incidents ==
- On October 26, 2006, a Swedish Coast Guard CASA 212-200 (registration: SE-IVF/serial nr: KBV 585) crashed in the Falsterbo Canal during a surveillance mission, killing all four on board. Full article: 2006 Falsterbo Swedish Coast Guard crash
- On March 6, 2026, the Swedish Coast Guard cutter KBV 003 AMFITRITE boarded and diverted the general cargo vessel CAFFA which was on its way to Saint Petersburg, Russia. The ship had been under sanctions since November 2025, being suspected of exporting grain stolen from Ukraine by Russian war criminals.

== See also ==
- Swedish Customs Service
- Swedish Armed Forces
- Swedish Maritime Administration
- Swedish National Board of Fisheries
