= Transportation Safety Bureau =

Hungarian government agency

The Transportation Safety Bureau of Hungary (TSB, Hungarian: Közlekedésbiztonsági Szervezet, KBSZ) is a government agency of Hungary, headquartered in Budapest.

The Minister for Economy and Transport created the agency on 1 February 2006. It investigates air, rail, and marine accidents. Prior to the creation of the TSB, the Civil Aviation Safety Bureau of Hungary (CASB, Hungarian acronym: POLÉBISZ) served as the country's aviation accident investigation agency for four years, when it investigated over five hundred aircraft accidents and incidents.

== Offices ==
Its head office is currently at Laurus Offices (Laurus Irodaház) in Budapest. It was previously in Building 18/A of Terminal 1 of Budapest Ferenc Liszt International Airport.

== See also ==
- National Transport Authority (Hungary)
