= Sol Líneas Aéreas =

Argentine airline, 2005–2016

IATA	ICAO	Call sign
8R	OLS	FLIGHT SOL
- Founded: 2005
- Ceased operations: 2016
- Hubs: Islas Malvinas International Airport
- Secondary hubs: Aeroparque Jorge Newbery
- Fleet size: 4
- Destinations: 13
- Headquarters: Rosario, Argentina
- Key people: Horacio Angeli
- Website: www.sol.com.ar

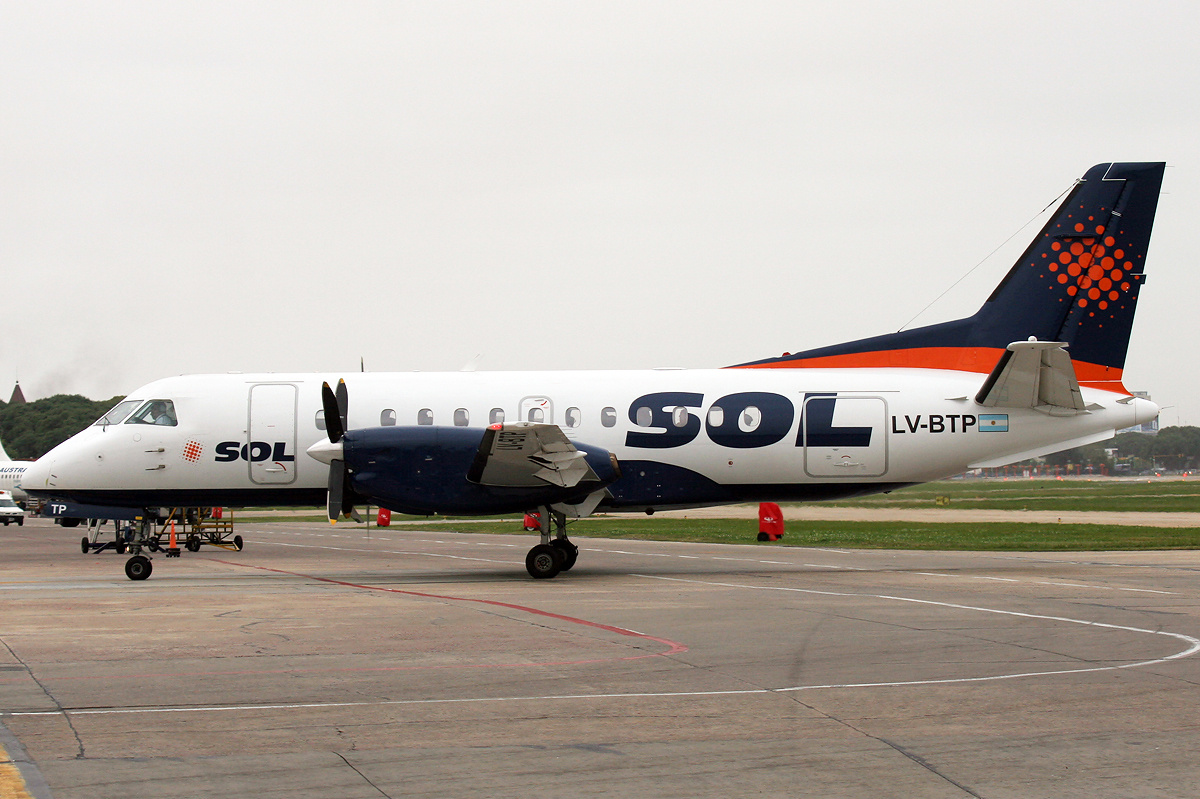
Sol Saab 340A

SOL S.A. Líneas Aéreas was an Argentine airline founded in 2005, and operating since August 2006 pursuant to an agreement between Transatlántica Group and the government of Santa Fe Province, who sought to improve air connections between the cities of Córdoba and Santa Fe. It had its headquarters in Rosario.

The airline filed for bankruptcy and ceased operation in January 2016. At the time of closure, the airline's fleet was made up of Saab 340 A/B and Bombardier CRJ200 aircraft.

== Corporate affairs ==
=== Key people ===
As of November 2013, Horacio Gabriel Angeli held the company's chief executive and president positions.

== Destinations ==
Sol Líneas Aéreas served the following destinations throughout its history:

Country	City	Airport name	Refs
Argentina	Bahía Blanca	Comandante Espora Airport	
Argentina	Bariloche	San Carlos de Bariloche Airport	
Argentina	Buenos Aires	Aeroparque Jorge Newbery	
Argentina	Comodoro Rivadavia	General Enrique Mosconi International Airport	
Argentina	Córdoba	Ingeniero Ambrosio L.V. Taravella International Airport	
Argentina	Esquel	Esquel Airport	
Argentina	Mar del Plata	Astor Piazzolla International Airport	
Argentina	Mendoza	Governor Francisco Gabrielli International Airport	
Argentina	Merlo	Villa de Merlo Airport	
Argentina	Neuquén	Presidente Perón International Airport	
Argentina	Río Gallegos	Piloto Civil Norberto Fernández International Airport	
Argentina	Río Grande	Hermes Quijada International Airport	
Argentina	Rosario	Islas Malvinas International Airport	
Argentina	San Luis	Brigadier Mayor César Raúl Ojeda Airport	
Argentina	Santa Fe	Sauce Viejo Airport	
Argentina	Trelew	Almirante Marcos A. Zar Airport	
Argentina	Tucumán	Teniente General Benjamín Matienzo International Airport	
Argentina	Ushuaia	Ushuaia – Malvinas Argentinas International Airport	
Argentina	Villa Gesell	Villa Gesell Airport	
Argentina	Villa Mercedes	Villa Reynolds Airport	
Uruguay	Montevideo	Carrasco International Airport	
Uruguay	Punta del Este	Capitan Corbeta C.A. Curbelo International Airport	

== Fleet ==
At time of shutdown:

SOL Líneas Aéreas fleet
Aircraft	In fleet	Orders	Passengers			Notes
Aircraft	In fleet	Orders	C	Y	Total	Notes
Bombardier CRJ200	—	5	—	50	50	
Saab 340 A/B	4	—	—	34	34	
Total	4	5				

In 2015, the airline took delivery of the first of six CRJ200 aircraft (leased from Air Nostrum) that were to enter service from October 2015.

== Accidents and incidents ==
18 May 2011: Flight 5428, a 1985-built Saab 340A, tail number LV-CEJ, operating a scheduled domestic Córdoba–Mendoza–Neuquén–Comodoro Rivadavia passenger service, crashed in Prahuaniyeu, 25 kilometres (16 mi) south-west of Los Menucos, in Río Negro Province, Argentina, while en route the last leg, following several distress calls made by the pilots. All 22 occupants of the aircraft, of whom 19 were passengers, perished in the accident. The cause of the accident had not been determined as of September 2011, although ice accumulation on the aircraft wings is believed to have been a factor.

== See also ==
- Transport in Argentina
