= Fina Air =

Airline of Puerto Rico

- Fina Air logo
- Commenced operations: 2003; 22 years ago
- Operating bases: Luis Muñoz Marín International Airport; Rafael Hernández Airport; Eugenio María de Hostos Airport
- Fleet size: See Fleet below
- Headquarters: San Juan, Puerto Rico
- Key people: Lazaro Canto (Founder and Chief Executive)

Fina Air was an airline based in San Juan, Puerto Rico named after Josefina Canto who was the mother of Lazaro Canto. It operated charter flights to the Dominican Republic from Luis Muñoz Marín International Airport in San Juan, Rafael Hernández Airport in Aguadilla and Eugenio María de Hostos Airport in Mayagüez. The airline has now ceased operations.

== History ==
The airline was established in 2003 by Lazaro Canto (Founder and Chief Executive). In the June 7 edition of the newspaper El Vocero, the management of Fina Air announced that the airline would begin flying on July 15, 2003, connecting San Juan and Mayagüez with six Dominican Republic destinations. The airline planned to expand to other countries within the Caribbean by 2005 and acquire jet aircraft. The July 15 date, however, was later changed to October 2. The 2005 expectations for acquiring jets and opening new routes were never met.

== Services ==
Apart from operating regularly scheduled services from Aguadilla, they also rented airplanes to United States immigration services, to return illegal immigrants from the Dominican Republic back home.

Fina Air was partnered with the U.S. group called Viva Airlines. The people involved left a list of unpaid debts, lawsuits, and unhappy investors after the death of Chief Executive Officer Lazaro Canto.

== Fleet ==
The Fina Air fleet of 3 Saab 340 aircraft have been purchased by an aircraft leasing company and were later operated by RegionsAir as Continental Connection, flying out of Cleveland. The airline did try to purchase 2 McDonnell Douglas DC-9-30 aircraft but the purchase was cancelled. After several flights cancelled from July to August 2005, the airline Fina Air conducted an activity in the Dominican Republic to compensate customers affected in the months of December and January, which granted money in cash awards and added works of art by members of the Oro Sólido music band and by Johnny Ventura, all customers signed documents stating that they were pleased with the agreed compensation.

One of Fina Air's SAAB 340 airplanes later crashed in Argentina, as Sol Líneas Aéreas Flight 5428.

== Livery ==
Because Puerto Rico is politically a part of the United States, Fina Air (not to be confused with the cargo airline Fine Air), had the American flag painted on their planes' fuselages. However, most of Fina Air planes carried the colors of the Puerto Rican flag.
