= Executive Airlines =

Regional airline headquartered in Carolina, Puerto Rico

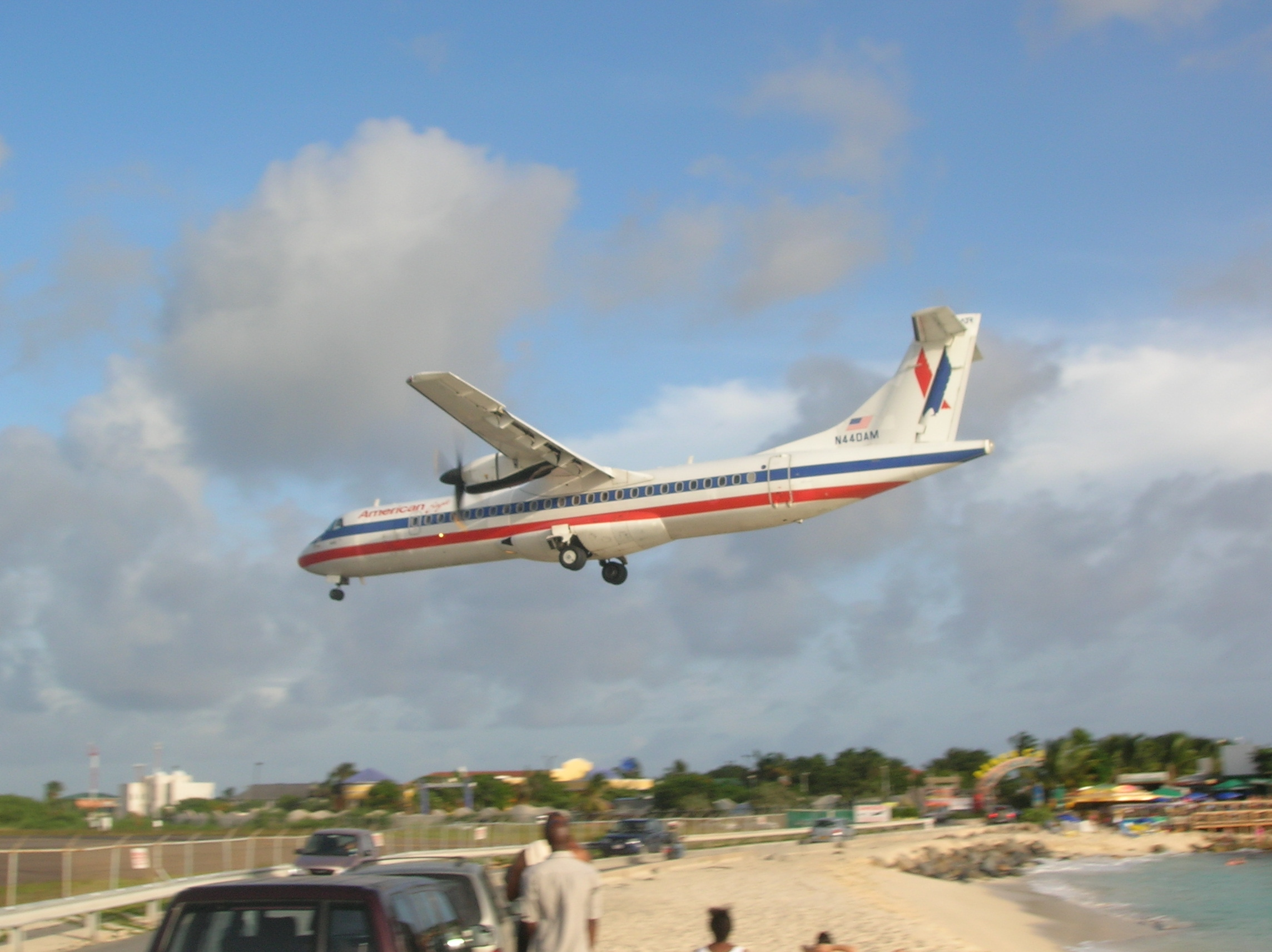
- American Eagle (Executive Air) ATR 72-212 landing at Princess Juliana International Airport
IATA	ICAO	Call sign
OW	EXK	EXECUTIVE EAGLE
- Founded: 1986; 40 years ago
- Ceased operations: April 1, 2013; 13 years ago
- Hubs: San Juan
- Frequent-flyer program: AAdvantage
- Alliance: Oneworld (Affiliate)
- Fleet size: 12
- Destinations: 12
- Parent company: AMR Corporation
- Headquarters: Carolina, Puerto Rico
- Key people: Pedro Fabregas (President)
- Employees: 2,125 (2007)

Executive Airlines, Inc. was a Puerto Rican-based regional airline headquartered at Luis Muñoz Marín International Airport in Carolina, Puerto Rico, the main airport for the United States territory, near the capital of San Juan. The airline was a wholly owned subsidiary of the AMR Corporation and it was paid by fellow AMR member American Airlines to staff, operate and maintain aircraft used on American Eagle flights that were scheduled, marketed and sold by American Airlines. Executive Airlines operated an extensive inter-island network in the Caribbean and the Bahamas from its hub in San Juan.

The airline was founded as Executive Air Charter in 1979; it joined the American Eagle system on September 15, 1986 as an independent airline. The company was purchased by AMR on December 7, 1989. In late 2007, AMR attempted to spin off Executive Airlines, but the effort was unsuccessful. AMR eventually announced that it would close Executive Airlines on March 31, 2013.

The Executive Airlines name was also used by a U.S.-based commuter air carrier which operated scheduled passenger flights during the late 1960s and early 1970s in the northeast U.S. and Florida.

== History ==
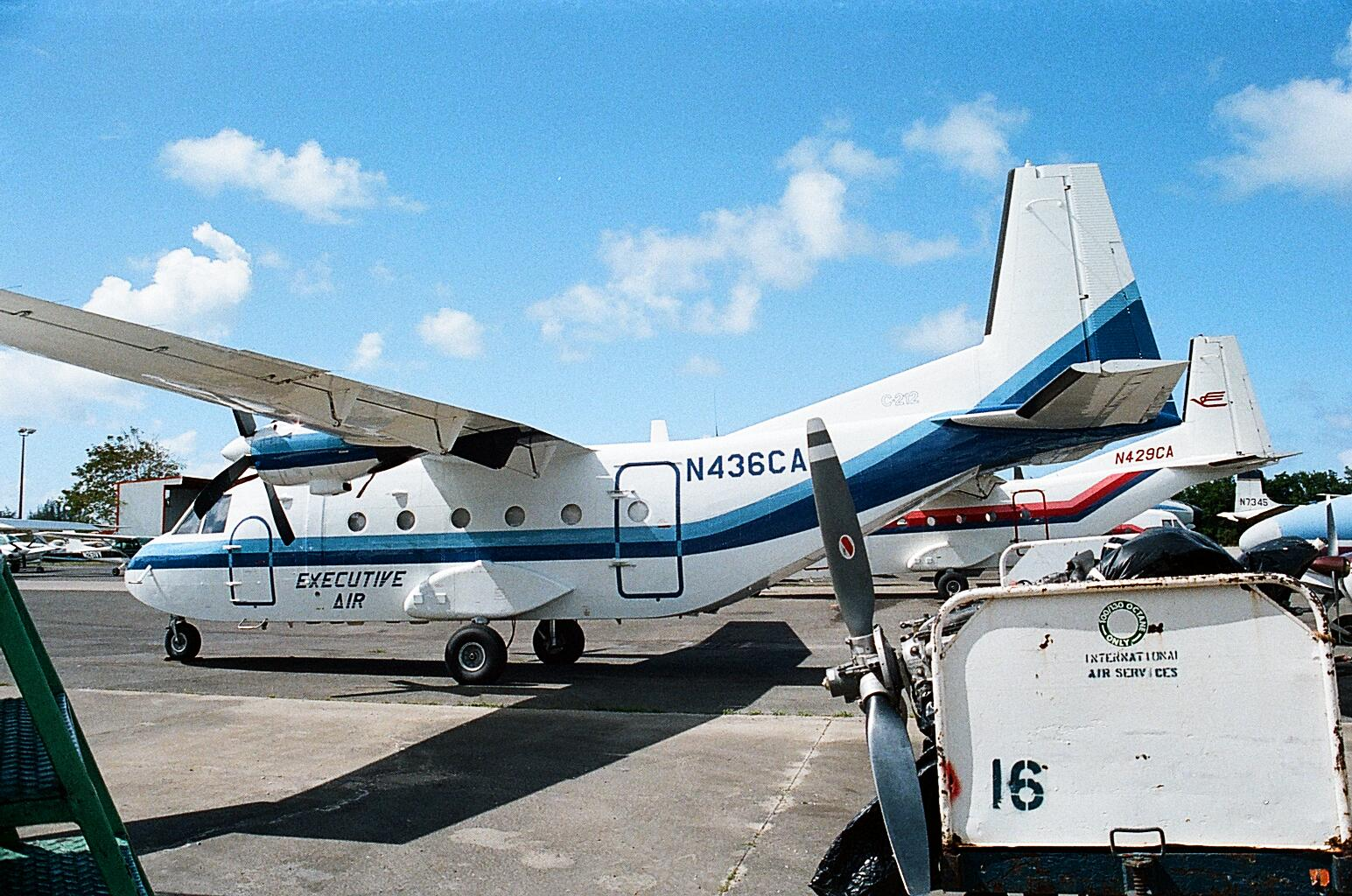
An Executive Airlines CASA C-212 (operated for American Eagle) at San Juan International Airport, Puerto Rico, 1986

The airline was founded by Puerto Rican businessman Joaquín Bolivar as Executive Air Charter in 1979, and on September 15, 1986 joined the American Eagle system as an independent airline operating code sharing flights on behalf of American Airlines.

The airline was purchased by the AMR Corporation, which at the time was the holding company of American Airlines and American Eagle Airlines.

In late 2007, it was announced AMR planned to spin off American Eagle Airlines and Executive Airlines. In 2008, AMR put the spin-off plans on hold until the airline industry stabilized after the 2008 financial crisis. In February 2008, Executive Airlines fleet of 12 ATR 72 turboprop aircraft were used to generate cash for the struggling AMR in a leaseback transaction.

On November 29, 2011, AMR Corporation filed for a Chapter 11 reorganization bankruptcy. Executive was forced to return its aircraft to the leasing company starting in 2012. As part of the changes during the AMR bankruptcy and merger with US Airways to form the American Airlines Group, the decision was made to close Executive Airlines on March 31, 2013. The airline's president and CEO, Pedro Fabregas would remain with the company and would become the president and CEO of American Eagle Airlines, which would be renamed Envoy Air.

== Former destinations ==
Further information : American Eagle (airline brand) - (MQ) American Eagle Airlines / Envoy Destinations

Destinations served from the former American Airlines San Juan hub

- Anguilla
  - The Valley (Clayton J. Lloyd International Airport)
- Antigua and Barbuda
  - St. John's (VC Bird International Airport)
- Aruba
  - Oranjestad (Queen Beatrix International Airport)
- Barbados
  - Bridgetown (Grantley Adams International Airport)
- Bonaire
  - Kralendijk (Flamingo International Airport)
- British Virgin Islands
  - Tortola (Terrance B. Lettsome International Airport)
  - Virgin Gorda (Virgin Gorda Airport)
- Curaçao
  - Willemstad (Curaçao International Airport)
- Dominica
  - Roseau (Melville Hall Airport)
- Dominican Republic
  - Barahona (María Montez International Airport)
  - La Romana (La Romana International Airport)
  - Puerto Plata (Gregorio Luperón International Airport)
  - Punta Cana (Punta Cana International Airport)
  - Samaná (Samaná El Catey International Airport)
  - Santiago (Cibao International Airport)
  - Santo Domingo (Herrera International Airport)
  - Santo Domingo (Las Américas International Airport)
- France (Overseas departments)
  - Guadeloupe
    - Pointe-à-Pitre (Pointe-à-Pitre International Airport)
  - Martinique
    - Fort-de-France (Le Lamentin Airport)
- Grenada
  - Saint George (Maurice Bishop International Airport)
- Haiti
  - Port-au-Prince (Toussaint Louverture International Airport)
- Puerto Rico
  - Mayagüez (Eugenio Maria de Hostos Airport)
  - Ponce (Mercedita Airport)
- Saint Kitts and Nevis
  - Nevis (Vance W. Amory International Airport)
  - Saint Kitts (Robert L. Bradshaw International Airport, Basseterre)
- Saint Lucia
  - Castries (George F. L. Charles Airport)
- Saint Vincent and the Grenadines
  - Canouan (Canouan Airport)
  - Saint Vincent (E.T. Joshua Airport)
- Sint Maarten
  - Philipsburg (Princess Juliana International Airport)
- Trinidad and Tobago
  - Port of Spain (Piarco International Airport)
  - Tobago (Arthur Napoleon Raymond Robinson International Airport)
- U.S. Virgin Islands
  - Saint Croix (Henry E. Rohlsen International Airport)
  - Saint Thomas (Cyril E. King Airport)

== Fleet ==
The Executive Air fleet consisted of the following aircraft (at February 2008):

Executive Airlines Fleet
Aircraft	In Fleet	Orders	Passengers			Routes	Notes
Aircraft	In Fleet	Orders	J	Y	Total	Routes	Notes
ATR 72-200	12	0	0	64	64		

Prior to transitioning to an all ATR 72 fleet, Executive Airlines operated ATR 42, CASA 212, Cessna 402 and Short 360 propeller aircraft.

== Incidents and accidents ==
- May 8, 1987: American Eagle Flight 5452, a CASA 212-200 was on a domestically scheduled passenger flight between San Juan, Puerto Rico-Mayaguez, Puerto Rico crashed short of Runway 09 while landing at Mayaguez. After impacting, the plane continued through a chain link fence and a ditch. Of the 6 occupants onboard (4 passengers and 2 crew on board) 2 were killed. The cause of the crash was determined to be the improper maintenance in setting the flight idle propeller and engine fuel flow.
- June 7, 1992: American Eagle Flight 5456, a CASA 212-200 was on a regular flight between San Juan, Puerto Rico and Mayaguez, Puerto Rico when it lost control and crashed nose-down about 3/4 mile from the Mayaguez, Puerto Rico airport. Both crew and all three passengers were killed. The cause of the crash was the copilot's inadvertent activation of the levers, causing the plane to lose control.
- May 9, 2004: an American Eagle ATR 72, flight 5401, crashed on landing in San Juan, Puerto Rico after the captain lost control of the aircraft while landing. 17 people were injured.

== See also ==
- List of defunct airlines of the United States
