= Northwest Airlink Flight 2268 =

1987 aviation accident

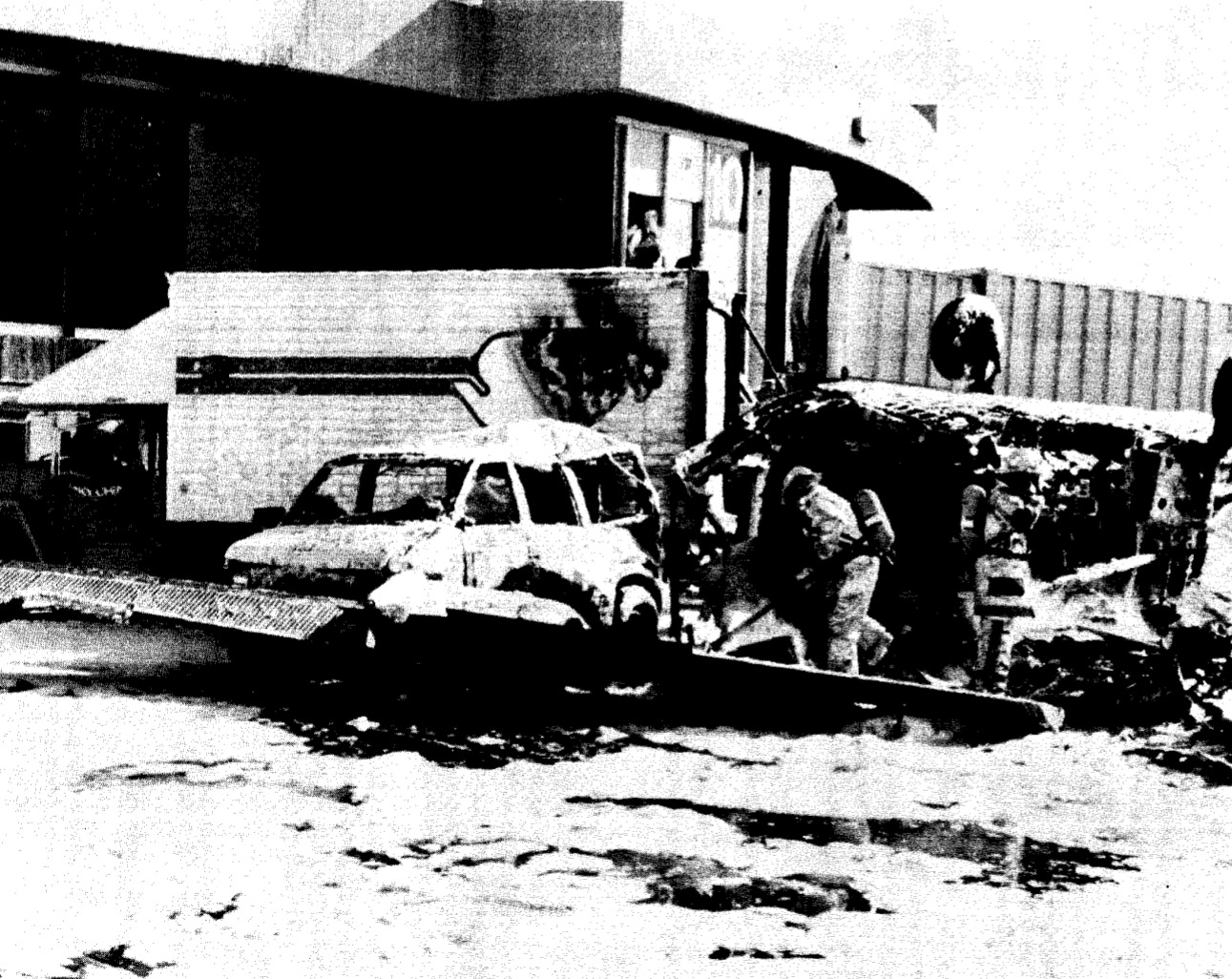
- The crash site of Flight 2268

Accident
- Date: March 4, 1987
- Summary: Pilot error
- Site: Detroit Metropolitan Wayne County Airport, Romulus, Michigan
- Total fatalities: 9
- Total injuries: 13

Aircraft
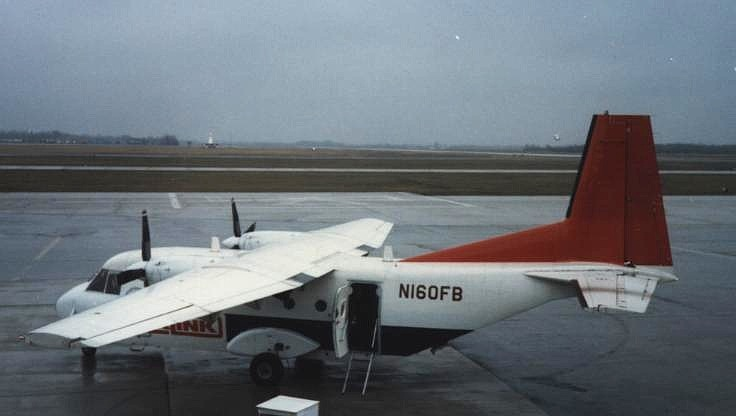
- N160FB, the accident aircraft in 1986
- Aircraft type: CASA C-212 Aviocar
- Operator: Fischer Brothers Aviation d/b/a Northwest Airlink
- ICAO flight No.: ANK2268
- Call sign: AIRLINK 2268
- Registration: N160FB
- Flight origin: Cleveland-Hopkins International Airport
- Destination: Detroit Metropolitan Wayne County Airport
- Occupants: 19
- Passengers: 16
- Crew: 3
- Fatalities: 9
- Injuries: 10
- Survivors: 10

Ground casualties
- Ground fatalities: 0
- Ground injuries: 3

Northwest Airlink Flight 2268 was a commuter flight between Cleveland-Hopkins International Airport in Cleveland, Ohio, United States, and Detroit Metropolitan Wayne County Airport in Romulus, Michigan, just outside Detroit. The flight was operated by Fischer Brothers Aviation, doing business as Northwest Airlink, and was operated by a CASA C-212 aircraft. On March 4, 1987, the plane crashed while attempting to land. Nine of the 19 passengers and crew on board were killed in the crash.

== Aircraft and crew ==
The aircraft involved in the accident was a CASA-212-CC, it was an earlier military plane which was later converted to a civil version. Registered N160FB, it received its US type certification on May 16, 1980, with serial No. 160. The airplane had a total of 12,917 hours and 24,218 cycles.

The crew consisted of two pilots and one flight attendant. Three deadheading crew members and a company manager were also on-board.

The pilot flying was 45-year-old Captain David Sherer, employed by Fischer Bros. Aviation in March 1970. He had a total of 17,953 hours of flight time of which 3,144 hours were on the C-212. The pilot monitoring was 26-year-old First Officer Shawn Manningham, employed by Fischer Bros. Aviation in July 1986. He had a total of 1,593 flight hours, of which 212 hours were on the C-212.

== Accident ==
At 2:30 p.m. after being cleared for a visual approach to Runway 21R and while just 60–70 feet above the ground, Flight 2268 banked left in a descent and then rolled right. The twin-engine turboprop aircraft struck the ramp area inside and to the left of the runway threshold, flipping over, and then striking a catering truck before bursting into flames.

Nine of the 19 people on board the aircraft died, including both pilots. Autopsies determined the cause of death to be smoke inhalation and burns. Federal investigators said the nine victims may not have died if their seat cushions had been treated with fire retardant. Three people on the ground were also injured in the accident.

== Investigation ==
The job of investigating the crash was made difficult due to the aircraft having neither a flight data recorder or cockpit voice recorder.

Shortly after the investigation was started, it was learned that Captain Sherer had been cited twice for unsafe flying. Records showed that he had had his license suspended for 15 days in 1979.

The National Transportation Safety Board determined that the probable cause of the accident was "the captain’s inability to control the airplane in an attempt to recover from an asymmetric power condition at low speed following his intentional use of the beta mode of propeller operation to descend and slow the airplane rapidly on final approach for landing. Factors that contributed to the accident were an unstabilized visual approach, the presence of a departing DC-9 on the runway, the desire to make a short field landing, and the higher-than-normal flight idle fuel flow settings of both engines. The lack of fire-blocking material in passenger seat cushions contributed to the severity of the injuries."

== See also ==
- Northwest Airlines Flight 255, another aviation disaster that took place at Detroit Metropolitan Wayne County Airport in 1987.
- Air Caraïbes Flight 1501, a similar plane crash in Guadeloupe where the investigation was hampered due to the absence of flight recorders
- American Eagle Flight 5452, a similar crash in Puerto Rico just two months later also involving a CASA C-212.
- TAROM Flight 371 and Manx2 Flight 7100, other cases where asymmetrical thrust resulted in a loss of control.
