= Sol Líneas Aéreas Flight 5428 =

2011 aviation accident in Argentina

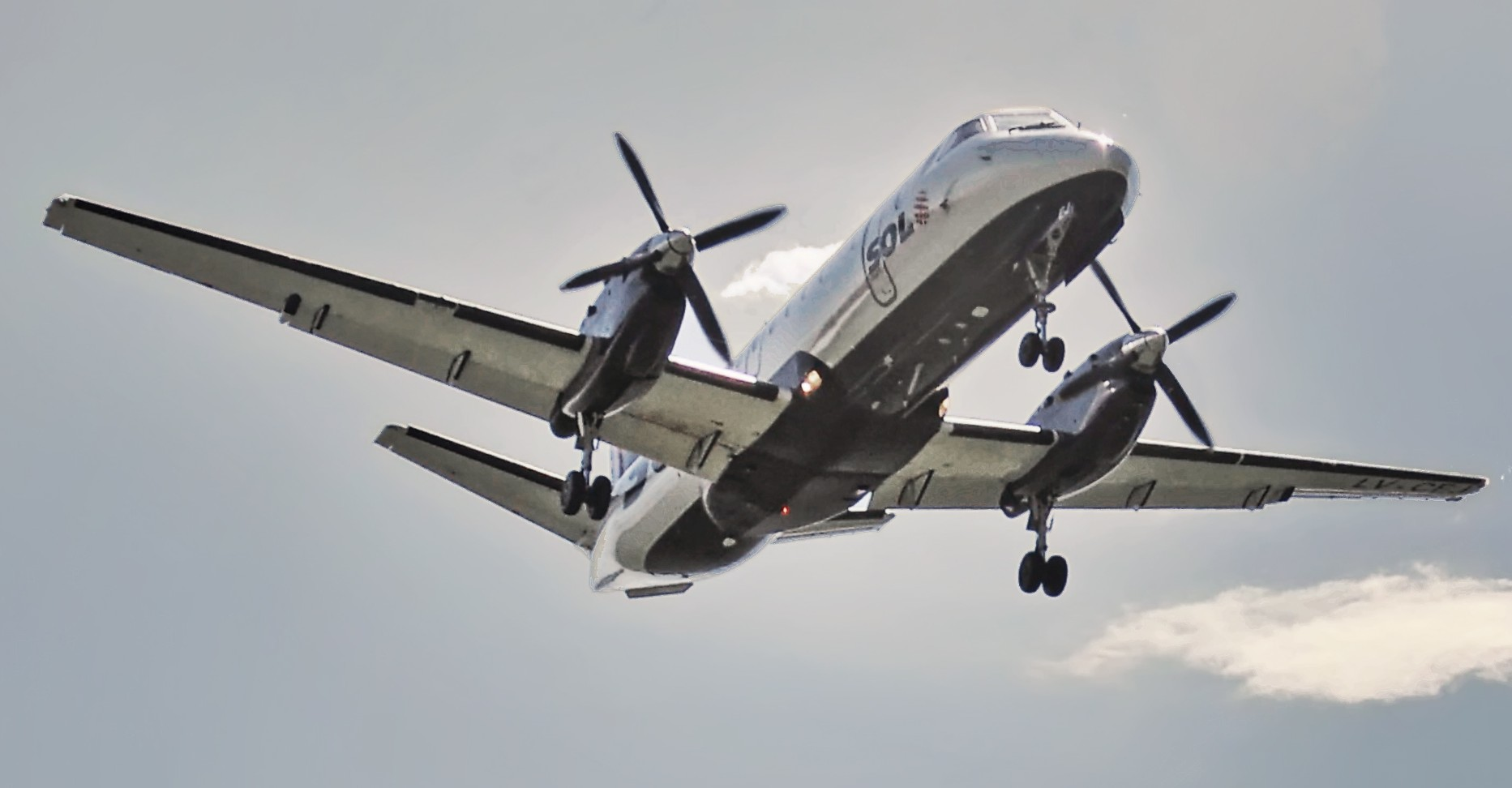
- LV-CEJ, the aircraft involved in the accident, photographed in March 2011

Accident
- Date: 18 May 2011
- Summary: Loss of control and crash at night in icing conditions
- Site: Approx. 30 km SW of Los Menucos, Río Negro, Argentina; 41°05′16″S 067°56′53″W

Aircraft
- Aircraft type: Saab 340A
- Operator: Sol Líneas Aéreas
- IATA flight No.: 8R5428
- ICAO flight No.: OLS5428
- Call sign: FLIGHT SOL 5428
- Registration: LV-CEJ
- Flight origin: Rosario – Islas Malvinas International Airport, Rosario, Argentina
- 1st stopover: Ingeniero Aeronáutico Ambrosio L.V. Taravella International Airport, Córdoba, Argentina
- 2nd stopover: Governor Francisco Gabrielli International Airport, Mendoza, Argentina
- 3rd stopover: Presidente Perón International Airport, Neuquén, Argentina
- Destination: General Enrique Mosconi International Airport, Comodoro Rivadavia, Argentina
- Occupants: 22
- Passengers: 19
- Crew: 3
- Fatalities: 22
- Survivors: 0

Sol Líneas Aéreas Flight 5428 was a passenger flight which crashed near Los Menucos, Argentina, on 18 May 2011, killing all 22 people on board. The aircraft involved, a Saab 340, was operating Sol Líneas Aéreas' scheduled domestic service from Neuquén to Comodoro Rivadavia.

The following investigation concluded that severe airframe icing had led to a loss of control from which the crew was unable to recover. The crash is the deadliest aviation accident involving a Saab 340.

== History of the flight ==
Flight 5428 had taken off from Rosario International Airport at 17:35 local time (20:35 UTC) on 18 May bound for Comodoro Rivadavia Airport. The service was scheduled to stop over at Córdoba, Mendoza and Neuquén. After completing the first three segments uneventfully, the Saab 340 took off from Presidente Perón International Airport in Neuquén at 20:05 for its final leg.

At around 20:29, while climbing toward its assigned flight level FL190 (19,000 feet (5,800 m)), the aircraft encountered icing conditions and levelled off at 17,800 feet (5,400 m), continuing at this altitude for approximately 9 minutes. With icing conditions persisting, the crew initiated a descent to FL140 (14,000 feet (4,300 m)), but during the following 7 minutes, icing conditions significantly worsened. Control of the aircraft was lost shortly after, and the Saab 340 impacted the ground in a remote region of the Río Negro Province, between the villages of Los Menucos and Prahuaniyeu.

The aircraft was flying at night, in instrument meteorological conditions and in an area without VHF radio coverage. A mayday call was received by the crew of a business jet flying in the area shortly before Flight 5428 was lost. Local people around 2 kilometres (1.2 mi; 1.1 nmi) away from the crash site saw an airplane flying extremely low. A few moments later they heard explosions and noticed black smoke coming from the ground. Firefighters arrived at the scene three hours later, finding no survivors.

== Aircraft and crew ==
The plane involved in the accident was a 26-year-old Saab 340A twin-turboprop. It was delivered to Comair in 1985 and registered N344CA. In 1997, it became N112PX with Northwest Airlink. It retained the same registration when it went to the Puerto Rican carrier Fina Air in 2003, and later on, when it went to fly for RegionsAir in 2006. The airplane was stored by this latter airline in 2007 before being bought by Sol Líneas Aéreas in July 2010.

The flight crew consisted of Captain Juan Raffo (45), who had 6,902 flight hours (2,181 in the Saab 340), First Officer Adriano Bolatti (37), who had 1,340 flight hours (285 in the Saab 340), and one flight attendant.

== Passengers ==
One of the passengers was a child, while the rest were adults. Nine passengers boarded the airplane in Mendoza, nine in Neuquén, and one in Córdoba. One of the passengers used a passport for identification purposes at the check-in desk, while the rest used Argentine Documento Nacional de Identidad (DNI) identity documents. All of the passengers had Comodoro Rivadavia as their final destination, except for one of them, who flew from Córdoba to Mendoza.

== Investigation ==
The aircraft's flight recorders were recovered two days after the crash. The Argentinian Junta de Investigaciones de Accidentes de Aviación Civil (JIAAC) opened an investigation into the accident. In September 2011, a preliminary report was issued which stated that the cause of the accident was a stall due to severe airframe icing and subsequent loss of control.

The JIAAC published its final report in March 2015, confirming the findings of the preliminary report. No evidence of technical defects in the aircraft was found. It was determined that the icing conditions encountered were so severe that the aircraft's de-icing systems were overwhelmed. However, it was also noted that engine power and airspeed management by the flight crew was inadequate; in particular, the engines were never set to full power and the airspeed was allowed to decay until the aircraft stalled. It was also determined that the weather reports that the crew received called for minor icing, and thus they were not prepared for the conditions that they actually encountered.

The JIAAC described the crew's stall recovery technique as inappropriate and issued several safety recommendations to aviation authorities and organisations, calling for more pilot training in aircraft upset recovery, incipient stall recognition and stall recovery.

== In popular culture ==
The accident is featured in the sixth episode of Season 20 of Mayday, also known as Air Crash Investigation. The episode is titled "Icy Descent".

== See also ==
- List of accidents and incidents involving commercial aircraft
