= American Eagle Flight 5456 =

Accident in Mayagüez, Puerto Rico on June 7, 1992

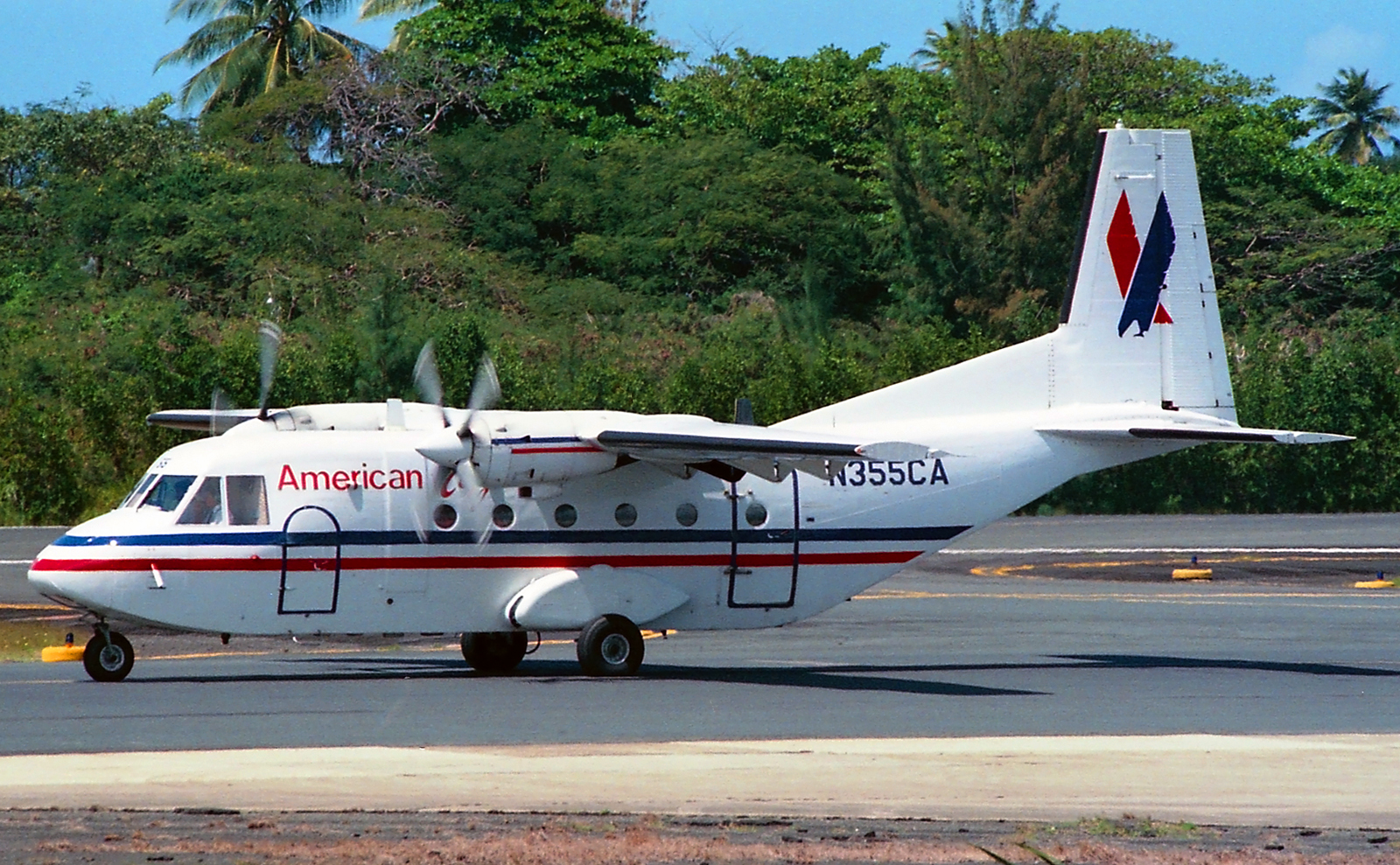
- N355CA, the aircraft involved in the accident, pictured in 1989

Accident
- Date: June 7, 1992
- Summary: Loss of control due to reverse thrust activation
- Site: Near Eugenio María de Hostos Airport, Mayagüez, Puerto Rico; 18°15′20″N 67°08′54″W

Aircraft
- Aircraft type: CASA C-212
- Operator: Executive Air Charter doing business as American Eagle
- IATA flight No.: OW5456
- ICAO flight No.: EXK5456
- Call sign: EXECUTIVE EAGLE 5456
- Registration: N355CA
- Flight origin: Luis Muñoz Marín International Airport, San Juan, Puerto Rico
- Destination: Eugenio María de Hostos Airport, Mayagüez, Puerto Rico
- Occupants: 5
- Passengers: 3
- Crew: 2
- Fatalities: 5
- Survivors: 0

American Eagle Flight 5456, officially operating as Executive Air Charter Flight 5456, was a scheduled commuter flight between Luis Muñoz Marín International Airport in San Juan, Puerto Rico and Eugenio María de Hostos Airport in Mayagüez, Puerto Rico. The flight was operated by Executive Airlines, dba American Eagle, and was operated by a CASA C-212 aircraft. On June 7, 1992, the plane crashed during heavy rain into a swamp short of the runway, killing all 5 people on board.

== Background ==
=== Aircraft ===
The aircraft involved in the accident was a ten year old CASA C-212 Aviocar 200 registered as N335CA, with the serial number of 234. The total amount of flight hours for the aircraft was 14,135.

=== Crew ===
The captain on board Flight 5456 was an Alton Emmanuel Leslie from Charlotte Amalie, St. Thomas who was 31 years old and had 6,634 flight hours, with 2,634 on the type. The first officer was Joseph Dischler from Jennings, Louisiana, who was 30 years old and an unknown amount of flight hours.

== Accident ==
While on approach into Eugenio María de Hostos Airport in Puerto Rico, the first officer inadvertently pulled the power levers into the beta position, (otherwise known was reverse thrust), causing the aircraft to start rapidly descending and eventually impacting a swamp. The impact killed all 5 people on board.

== Investigation ==
When word of the accident spread to the NTSB, an investigation was immediately started, which ended up lasting 3 months and 4 years. The investigation determined that the beta blocking device had failed after being heavily corroded, causing the failure and the first officer inadvertently causing the engines to go into beta mode, leading to a loss of control that ended up killing everyone. The probable cause read as follows:

"The National Transportation Safety Board determines the probable cause of this accident to be the failure of the beta blocking device for undetermined reasons, and the second-pilot's inadvertent activation of the power lever, or levers, aft of the flight idle position and into the beta range, resulting in a loss of airplane."

== See also ==
- Luxair Flight 9642
