= American Eagle Flight 5452 =

1987 aviation accident

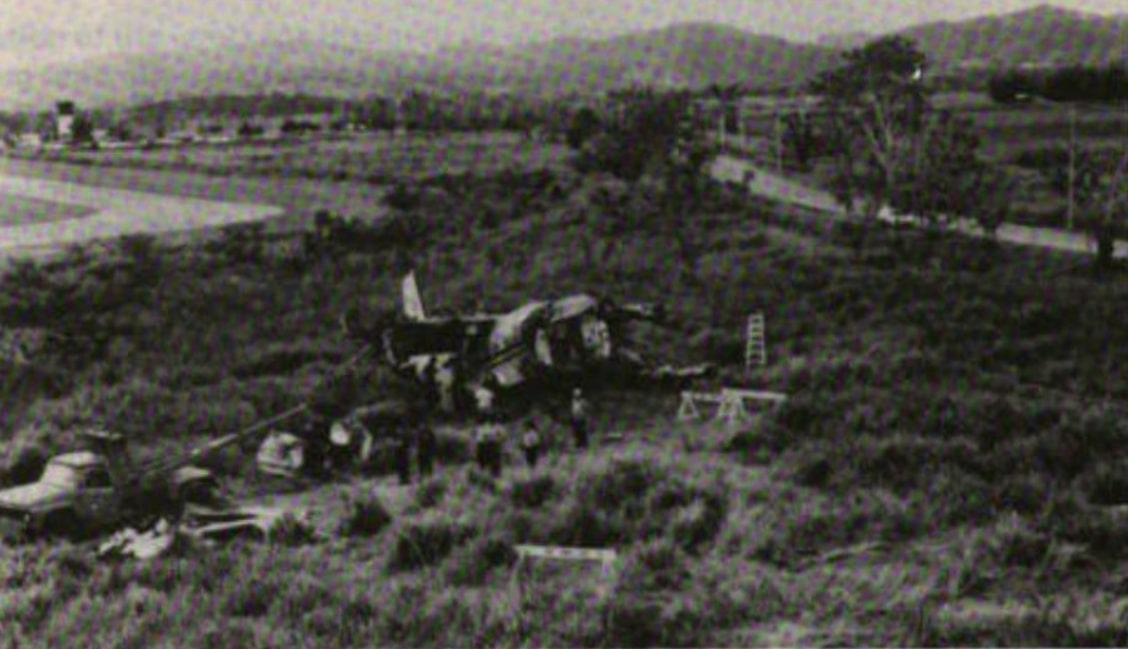
- Wreckage at the crash site.

Accident
- Date: May 8, 1987
- Summary: Improper maintenance, pilot error
- Site: Eugenio María de Hostos Airport, Mayagüez, Puerto Rico; 18.2536°N 67.1566°W

Aircraft
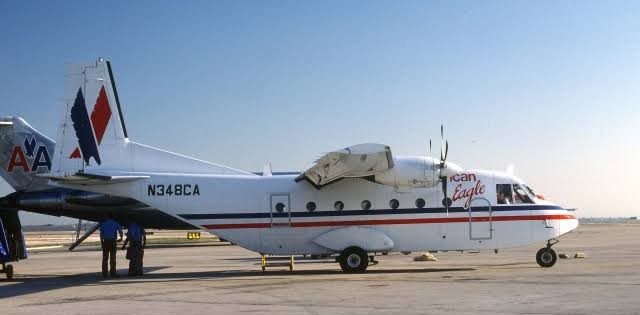
- A CASA C-212 operated by American Eagle, similar to the one involved
- Aircraft type: CASA C-212 Aviocar
- Operator: Executive Air Charter dba American Eagle
- Call sign: EXECUTIVE EAGLE 5452
- Registration: N432CA
- Flight origin: Luis Muñoz Marín International Airport, San Juan, Puerto Rico
- Destination: Eugenio María de Hostos Airport, Mayagüez, Puerto Rico
- Occupants: 6
- Passengers: 4
- Crew: 2
- Fatalities: 2
- Injuries: 4
- Survivors: 4

American Eagle Flight 5452, officially operating as Executive Air Charter Flight 5452, was a commuter flight between Luis Muñoz Marín International Airport in San Juan, Puerto Rico and Eugenio María de Hostos Airport in Mayagüez. The flight was operated by Executive Air Charter, doing business as American Eagle, and was operated by a CASA C-212 Aviocar aircraft. Visual meteorological conditions were present as the plane made its final approach to runway 9 at Mayagüez on May 8, 1987. The plane crashed 600 feet short of the runway, destroying the aircraft and killing both pilots, but leaving the four passengers with only minor injuries.

== Accident ==
Flight 5452 took off five minutes late, at 6:20 am, from San Juan with four passengers aboard. Half an hour later, as the flight was landing, witnesses reported hearing the engine make irregular sounds, and then observed the plane bank to the left and impact the ground. It was initially reported that the pilot lost control while landing. The plane crashed short of the runway and slammed into the airport perimeter fence. After the crash, a fire broke out, which was contained within minutes by airport firefighters.

== Aircraft ==
The aircraft, a CASA C-212~C registered N432CA, was put into service with Executive Air Charter in October 1986 after it was purchased from Prinair. As a result of the impact of the crash and subsequent fire, the aircraft was destroyed. The aircraft involved in the crash had prior maintenance troubles related to engine torque. In fact, just a day before the accident, issues with the propeller blade angle were addressed by Executive's maintenance department.

== Crew ==
The captain, Franklin Rivera Velez, 44, held an Airline Transport Pilot (ATP) certificate. He had 20 years of pilot experience, with about 10,000 hours of total flying time. He had accumulated about 5,000 hours of turbine engine airplane experience, 4,500 hours of which were in the deHavilland DHC-6 Twin Otter, and 473 hours of which were in the CASA C-212. The first officer, Reynold Santiago Cordero, 32, also held an ATP certificate. He had 10 years of pilot experience, with about 4,473 hours of total pilot time, 459 hours of which were in the CASA C-212. He was not type rated in the CASA C-212.

== Investigation ==
Early similarities were drawn between Flight 5452 and that of Northwest Airlink Flight 2268, another CASA C-212 which crashed in Detroit earlier that year. The National Transportation Safety Board (NTSB) investigated. The investigation was hindered by the lack of flight data or voice recorders, which were not required on commuter aircraft at the time, and by lack of radar data, as the Mayagüez control tower had been shut down by the Federal Aviation Administration due to budgetary constraints. Airport facilities, however, were not a factor in the crash.

The NTSB determined early on that the captain had flown an unstable approach, descending steeply and too close to the runway. As a result, the captain would not have had sufficient time to correct problems as they arose. Furthermore, the plane's flaps were found to be in the up position, which is improper procedure. The NTSB could only speculate that either the pilots forgot to set the flaps, or that they incorrectly retracted the flaps while attempting to go-around. The flap-setting error could have contributed to a stall.

Ultimately, the cause of the crash was not blamed on pilot error, although that was a contributing factor, but rather on maintenance issues at Executive Air Charter. Pilots on prior flights flying the accident aircraft had reported difficulties with the engine thrust, but few proper repairs were done. It seemed likely that one of the engines slipped to idle, causing asymmetrical thrust and a loss of speed.

The NTSB concluded that Executive Air Charter's scheduled maintenance and inspections of the airplane were not performed in conformance with its approved maintenance program, and that the manner in which required inspections of maintenance tasks were recorded and the subsequent approval of the airplane for return to service were not conducted in accordance with the proper maintenance practices.
