= Prahuaniyeu =

- Comisión de fomento
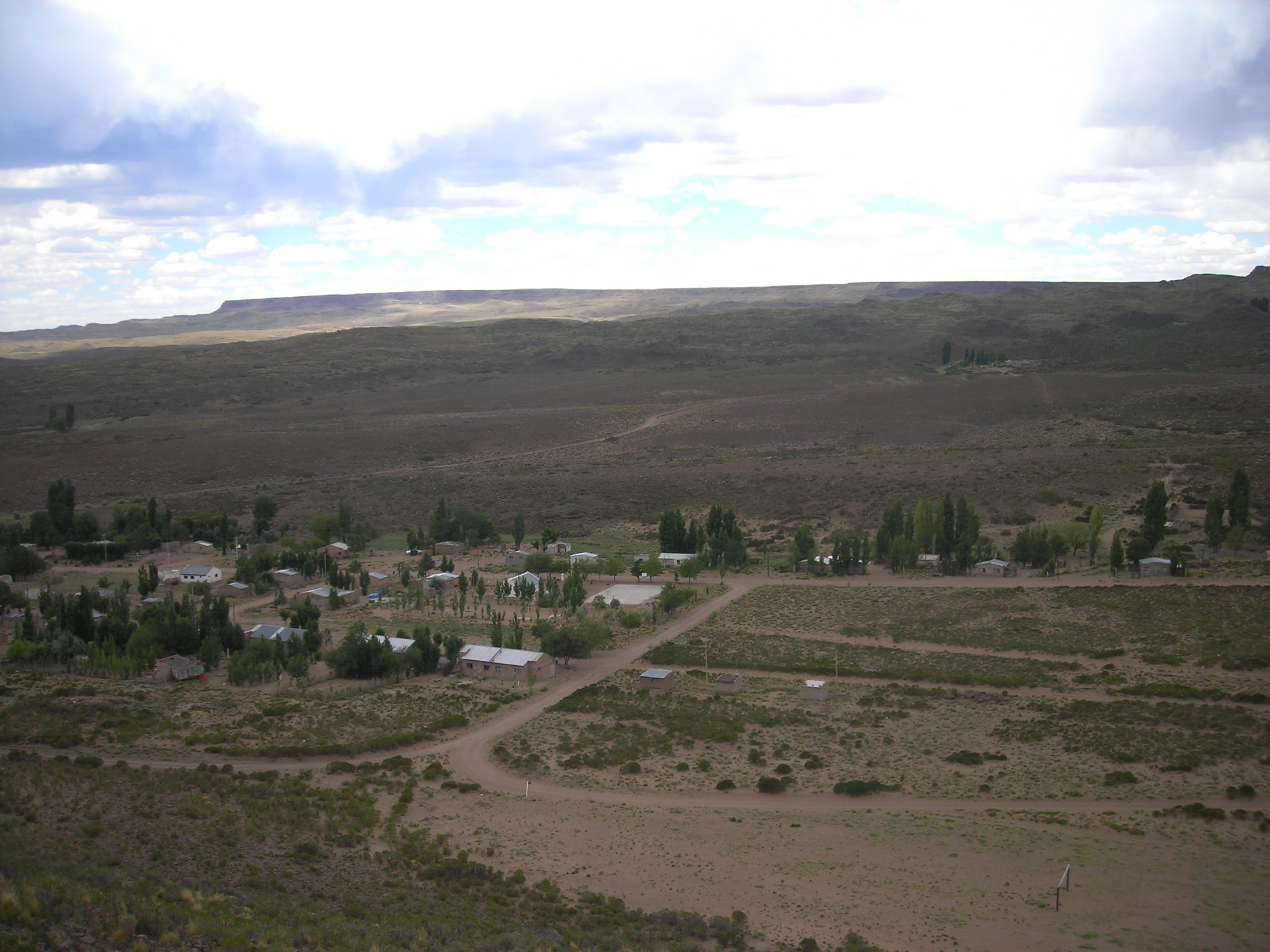
- Prahuaniyeu

- Location of Prahuaniyeu in Río Negro and Argentina
- Coordinates: 41.278°S 67.942°W
- Country: Argentina
- Province: Río Negro
- Department: Nueve de Julio

Government
  - Presidente: Orlando Goicochea

Population (2001)
  - Total: 139
- Time zone: UTC−3 (ART)
- Postal code: R8534
- Area code: 02934

Prahuaniyeu is a village and municipality in Río Negro Province in Argentina, located 70 kilometres (43 mi) south of Los Menucos on the Meseta de Somuncurá. The major economic activity is sheep and goat farming, with lambs and wool produced for sale.

On May 18, 2011, Sol Líneas Aéreas Flight 5428, en route from Neuquén to Comodoro Rivadavia, crashed near this location at around 9 pm (GMT-3). The impact killed all 22 people aboard, including a baby.
