= Saab 340 =

Regional airliner

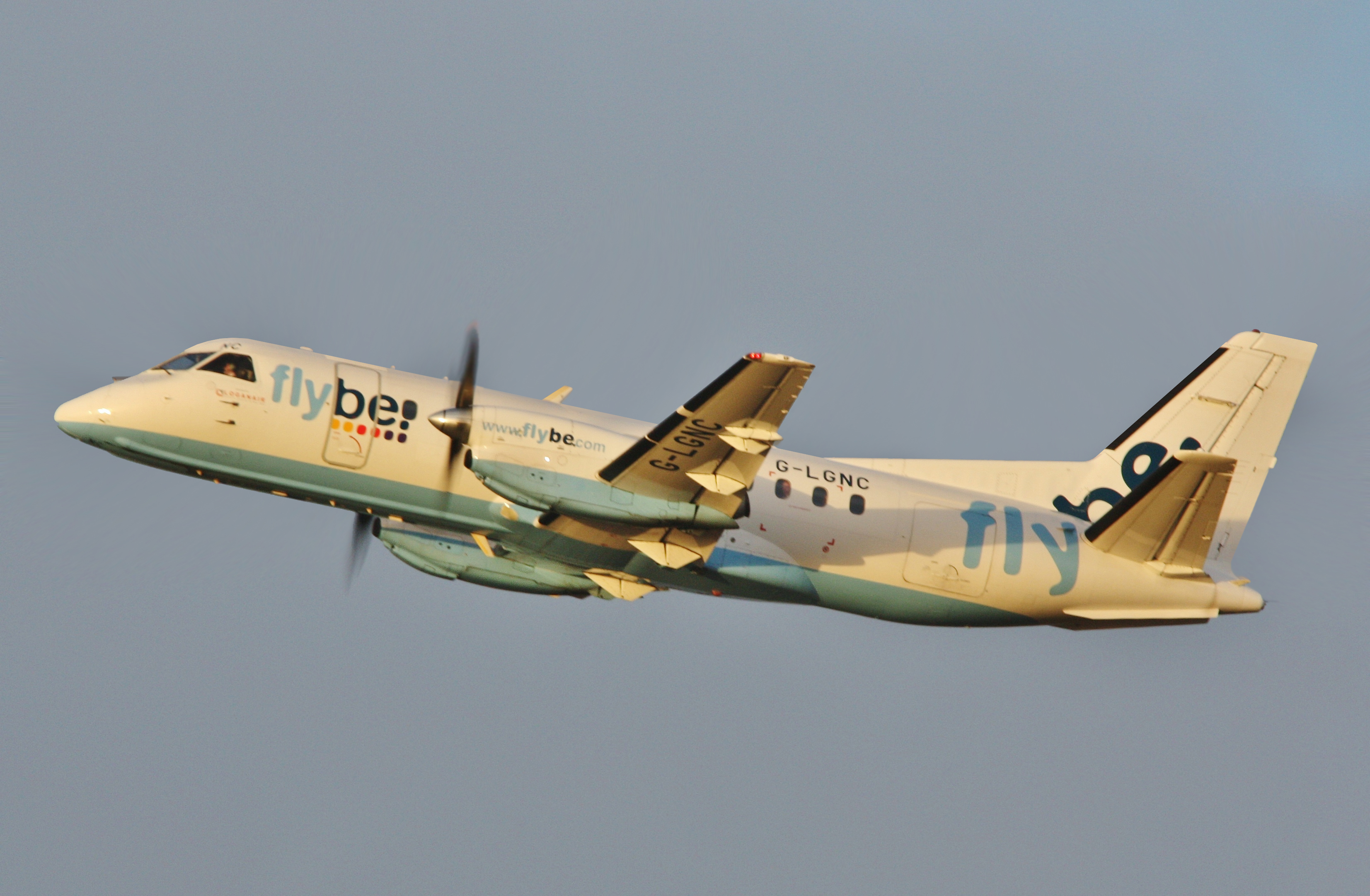
- Saab 340 operated by Loganair for Flybe

General information
- Type: Turboprop regional airliner
- National origin: Sweden; United States
- Manufacturer: Saab AB; Fairchild Aircraft
- Status: In service
- Primary user: Rex Airlines
- Number built: 459

History
- Manufactured: 1983–1999
- Introduction date: 1984
- First flight: 25 January 1983
- Variant: Saab 340 AEW&C
- Developed into: Saab 2000

The Saab 340 (also Saab SF340) is a Swedish twin-engine turboprop aircraft designed and initially produced by Saab AB and Fairchild Aircraft. It is designed to seat 30–36 passengers and, as of 2023, over 250 operational aircraft remained in active service worldwide.

Under the production arrangement in which production was split 65:35 between Saab and Fairchild, Saab constructed the all-aluminum fuselage and vertical stabilizer along with final assembly of the aircraft in Linköping, Sweden, while Fairchild was responsible for the wings, empennage, and wing-mounted nacelles for the two turboprop engines. After Fairchild ceased this work in 1985, production of these components was transferred to Sweden.

On 25 January 1983, the Saab 340 conducted its maiden flight. During the early 1990s, an enlarged derivative of the airliner, designated as the Saab 2000, was introduced. However, sales of the 340 and 2000 aircraft declined due to intense competition within the regional aircraft market, and Saab was forced to cease production of both aircraft in the late 1990s due to financial losses.

== Development ==
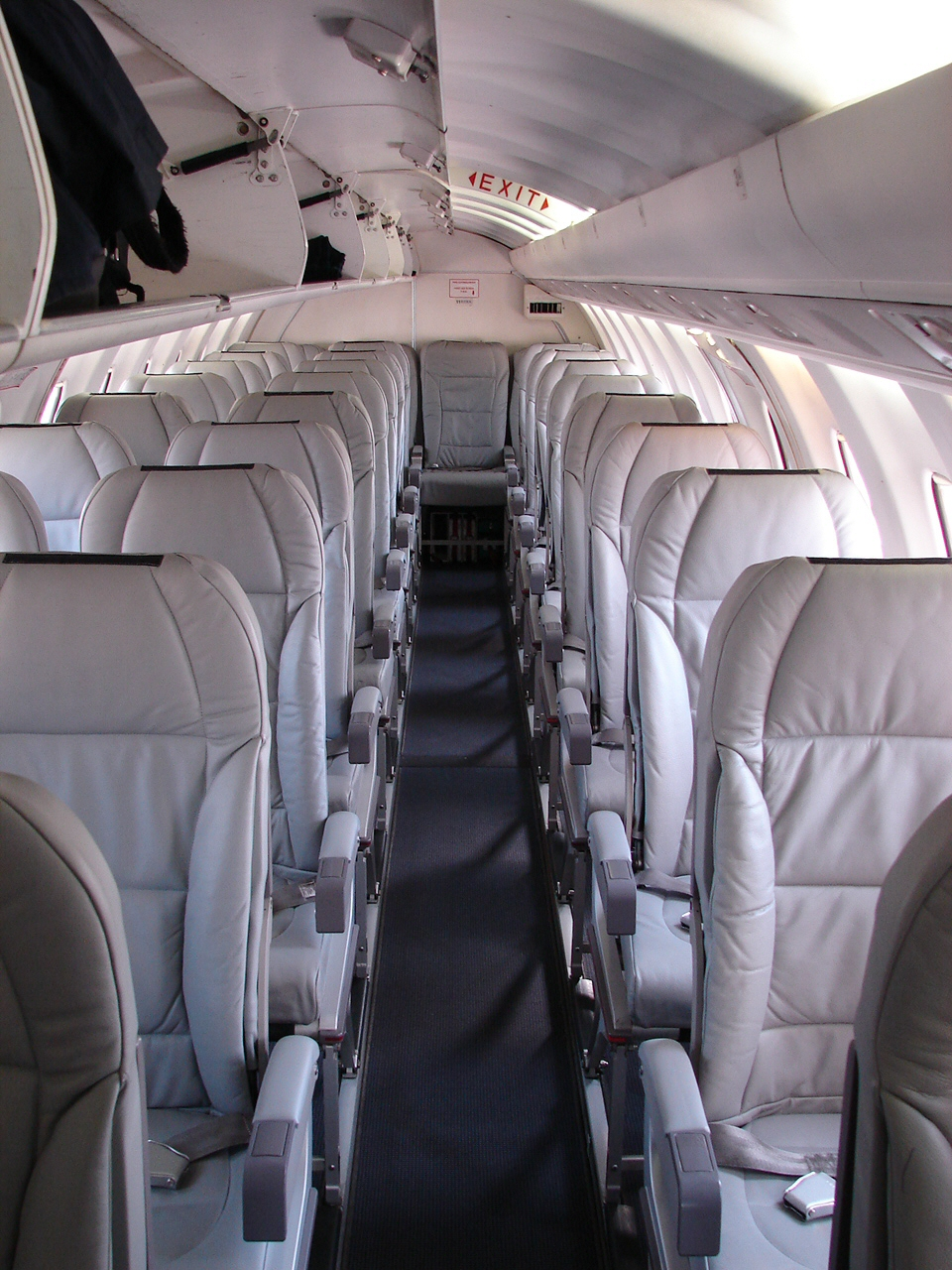
2+1 passenger cross-section.

=== Origins ===
During the 1970s, Swedish aircraft manufacturer Saab AB became increasingly interested in the civil aircraft market. In 1974, the company decided to proceed with developing its first major civilian aircraft, having previously focused almost entirely upon military aircraft. During the late 1970s, internal studies had determined that a short-haul airliner should be optimized to seat around 30 passengers. Likewise, it was decided to make use of turboprop propulsion, which was slower but more economical than turbofan engines, and to optimize the airliner to take advantage of this type of powerplant; this decision may have been influenced by high oil prices during that decade, such as the 1973 oil crisis. According to author Gunnar Eliasson, the selection of a turboprop engine made the type less attractive to airlines than jet-powered competitors, however recognized that the General Electric CT7-5A2 engine picked was quite competitive with the jet engines of that era. As conceived, the airliner was to match the performance of jets within its short-haul role.

Towards the end of the 1970s, the regional airliner venture had become the largest industrial venture in Sweden and was recognized as being too large for Saab to conduct alone. Accordingly, in January 1980, it was announced that Saab had entered into a partnership arrangement with US manufacturer Fairchild Aircraft to develop and produce the upcoming regional airliner. Under this partnership, Fairchild became responsible for the manufacture of sections such as the wings, tail unit, and engine nacelles while Saab was responsible for 75 per cent of the costs of development, system integration and certification. To match the new partnership, the type received the designation of SF340. The decision to develop a new generation regional airliner had fortuitously coincided with the removal of control by the US federal government under the 1978 Airline Deregulation Act, an event which would notably contribute to sales of the type during the following decade.

The 340 shared several manufacturing and design techniques that were used in Saab's military aircraft, such as the then in-development Saab JAS 39 Gripen multirole combat aircraft. One such technique was eliminating the use of rivets on the aluminum structures, using diffusion bonding instead, to reduce weight. On 25 January 1983, the first SF340 performed its maiden flight. Shortly following its launch onto the market in 1984, the Saab 340 became the best selling commuter aircraft in the world. By 1987, all activity by Fairchild on the programme had ceased, the US company having chosen to curtail its aircraft activities, thus Saab became solely responsible for producing the 340.

=== Further development ===
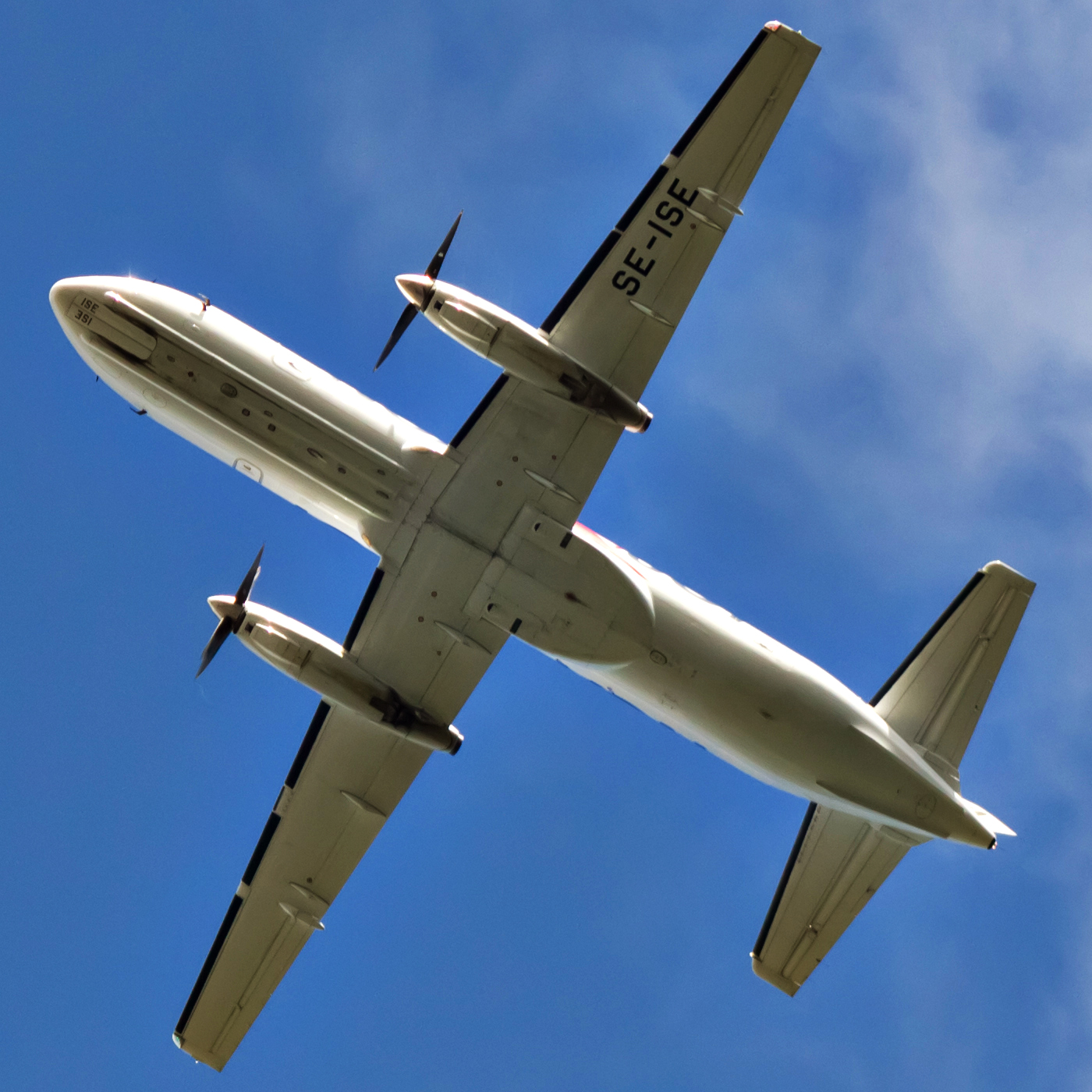
Platform view showing straight wing

In 1985, due to Fairchild's decision to exit the aircraft manufacturing business following the completion of the first 40 units, Saab dropped the Fairchild name from the project and proceeded to continue aircraft production, referring to the type under the designation Saab 340A. A total of 159 A models were manufactured. In 1989, an improved version of the airliner, the second generation 340B, introduced more powerful engines and wider horizontal stabilizers; later production 340Bs also featured an active noise control system. A total of 200 aircraft were built. In 1994, the final third generation version, the 340B Plus, was delivered for service and incorporated improvements that were being introduced at the same time upon the larger Saab 2000, itself a derivative of the 340. A total of 100 aircraft were completed, adding up to a total of 300 B models. The Saab 340 typically seated between 30 and 36 passengers, with 34 seats being the most common configuration. The last two 340s built were constructed as older configuration 36-seat aircraft for Japan Air Commuter.

One of the major improvements introduced in the 340B Plus was the installation of an active noise and vibration control system in the cabin, reducing noise and vibration levels by about ten dB during cruising flight. Additionally, an optional extended wingtip modification on the initial 340B (fitted to approximately 30 aircraft) was made standard on the 340B Plus. The interior design was also modernized, and the lavatory compartment was relocated from the aft of the passenger cabin to just aft of the flight deck in most 3rd generation units. This increased total available cargo volume as the original location intruded into the cargo bin area. While the active noise control became standard on all Saab 340Bs in 1994, the first-ever 340B Plus (third B+ built) was delivered new to Hazelton Airlines in Australia in 1995, later operating for Rex Airlines, and currently for the Japanese Coast Guard. The system could also be retrofitted onto existing airliners.

During 1997, Saab was releasing pessimistic press releases on the 340 programme, stating that it was considering the potential closure of production line, but also pledged that it would maintain full support to existing customers if this happened. On 24 December 1997, Saab announced that it had decided to terminate production of the 340 and 2000 models, which it claimed had lost SKr3 billion ($386.4 million) in the previous three years. By late 1998, as production was being slowed down towards an eventual shut down, Saab stated that it had been holding talks with a number of interested parties, reportedly including Indian and Chinese companies, on the potential sale of the 340 production line to another manufacturer. On 8 June 1999, the final 340 was delivered, by which time nearly 460 aircraft had been delivered. Production of all models of the 340 was terminated in 1999, and Saab ultimately decided to cease all civil aircraft production in 2005.

According to Eliasson, the decision to power the type using turboprop engines rather that jet engines had been provided as one of the reasons for Saab deciding to close down the project; another major factor had been the increasingly competitive and politicized regional airliner market in which various competing airlines were alleged to have substantially benefited from government subsidies, while the Swedish government were unwilling to make such commitments to Saab's civil projects. According to authors Sören Eriksson and Harm-Jan Steenhuis, while the 340 had been faster than jet-powered competitors such as the Fokker 100 and British Aerospace 146, it had no clear advantage in terms of payload or range; as the regional airliner market became increasingly crowded, newer types such as the Bombardier CRJ200 and Embraer ERJ 145 family, which did have an advantage over the 340, had led to diminished sales.

=== Derivatives ===
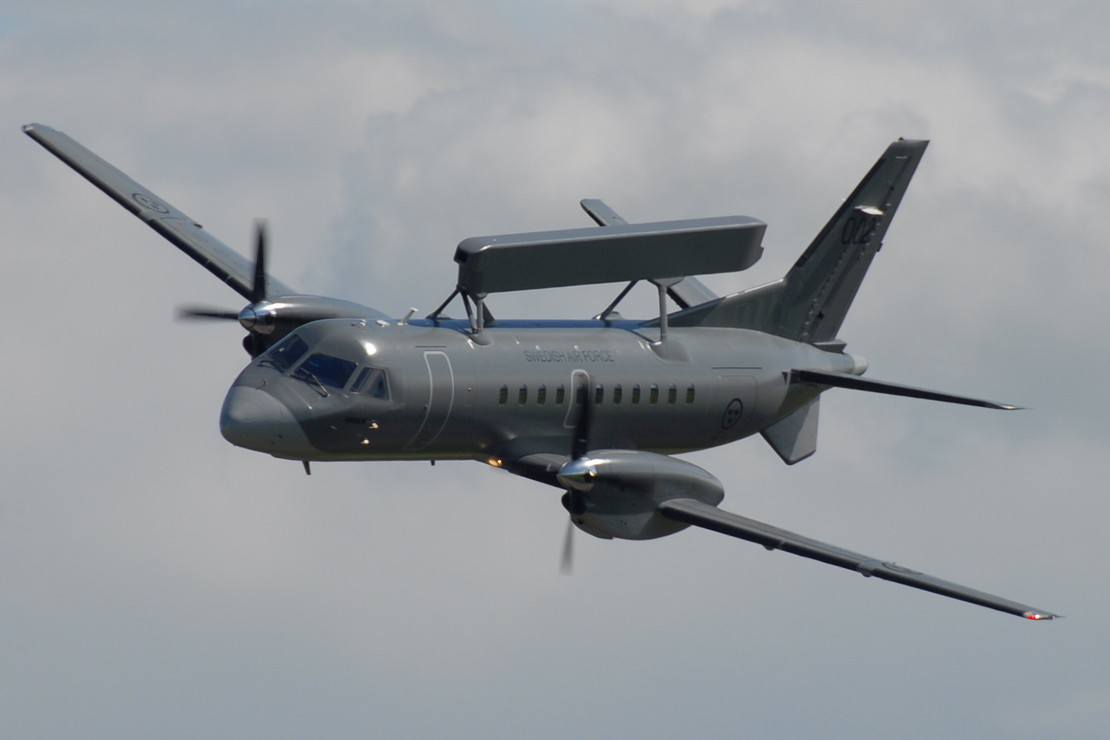
Saab 340 AEW&C with Erieye radar

During the early 1980s, Sweden's Defence Materiel Administration (FMV) requested that Ericsson, a Swedish electronics company, develop a suitable radar for an airborne early warning (AEW) system. The corresponding system was soon paired with the 340 as a platform. Several military variants of the type were produced, including the Saab 340 AEW&C, 340AEW-200 & 340AEW-300, which are AEW and airborne early warning & control (AEW&C) aircraft.

During the 2010s, Saab promoted the 340 in the maritime patrol mission. A specialized variant of the aircraft, designated as the 340 MSA, was mooted; the proposed patrol aircraft is to be equipped with various sensors and combat systems to be capable of performing both anti-surface and anti-submarine warfare, as well as signals intelligence and long range search and rescue operations. In June 2014, Anders Dahl, head of Saab Singapore, gave a presentation on the 340MSA, and observed that several nations were in talks with Saab on the type, as well as there being increasing demand for such maritime patrol aircraft in Southeast Asia.

== Operational history ==
On 6 June 1984, the Saab 340's launch customer, Swiss operator Crossair, received its first 340 aircraft. One week later, the type performed its first flight with paying customers on board; passengers on board this flight included Pope John Paul II.

During 1989, US regional airline American Eagle placed a large order for the type, procuring a total of 50 340Bs along with options for an additional 50 aircraft. However, business conditions and demand for turboprop-powered regional airliner transformed dramatically during the 1990s; this can be perhaps best summarized by American Eagle's decision in October 1999 to announce its intention to phase out its 340 fleet. Faced with diminished value and demand for the 340, Saab chose to shutter production in 1999.

While production of the type ceased in 1999, Saab continued to develop and heavily market the 340 for various purposes in both the civil and military markets. In July 2001, the company announced that it had launched a new partnership with service provider Piedmont Hawthorne to remarket used regional 340s to corporate customers. In April 2002, it was announced that Canadian company Field Aviation had been contracted by Saab to produce a freighter version of the 340, initially focusing on conversions of the earlier 340A model.

Even after production was terminated, a large number of 340s have remained in commercial service in the following decades. By 2006, there was a resurgence in demand for turboprop-powered airliners, in part due to the rising price of oil; during this year, Saab announced the largest ever leasing deal for the 340, providing a total of 25 340s to Australian operator Rex Airlines. By late 2010, Saab was evaluating the option of extending the certified lifespan of the 340 which, under the Maintenance Review Board program, is typically limited to 60,000 hours; the company believes the maintenance program could be extended to accommodate up to a 75,000 hour limit.

The existing aircraft have remained relatively active and competitive into the following decade. In late 2008, following a merger between US carriers Northwest Airlines and Delta Air Lines, the latter announced that a new Saab 340 base was being formed in Atlanta, after which the merged airline would replace its inventory of 12 ATR 72s in its regional fleet with 49 former Northwest 340s. During early 2009, Russian operator Polet Flight conducted talks with American Eagle to lease 25 340s to increase its breadth of regional flights.

== Variants ==
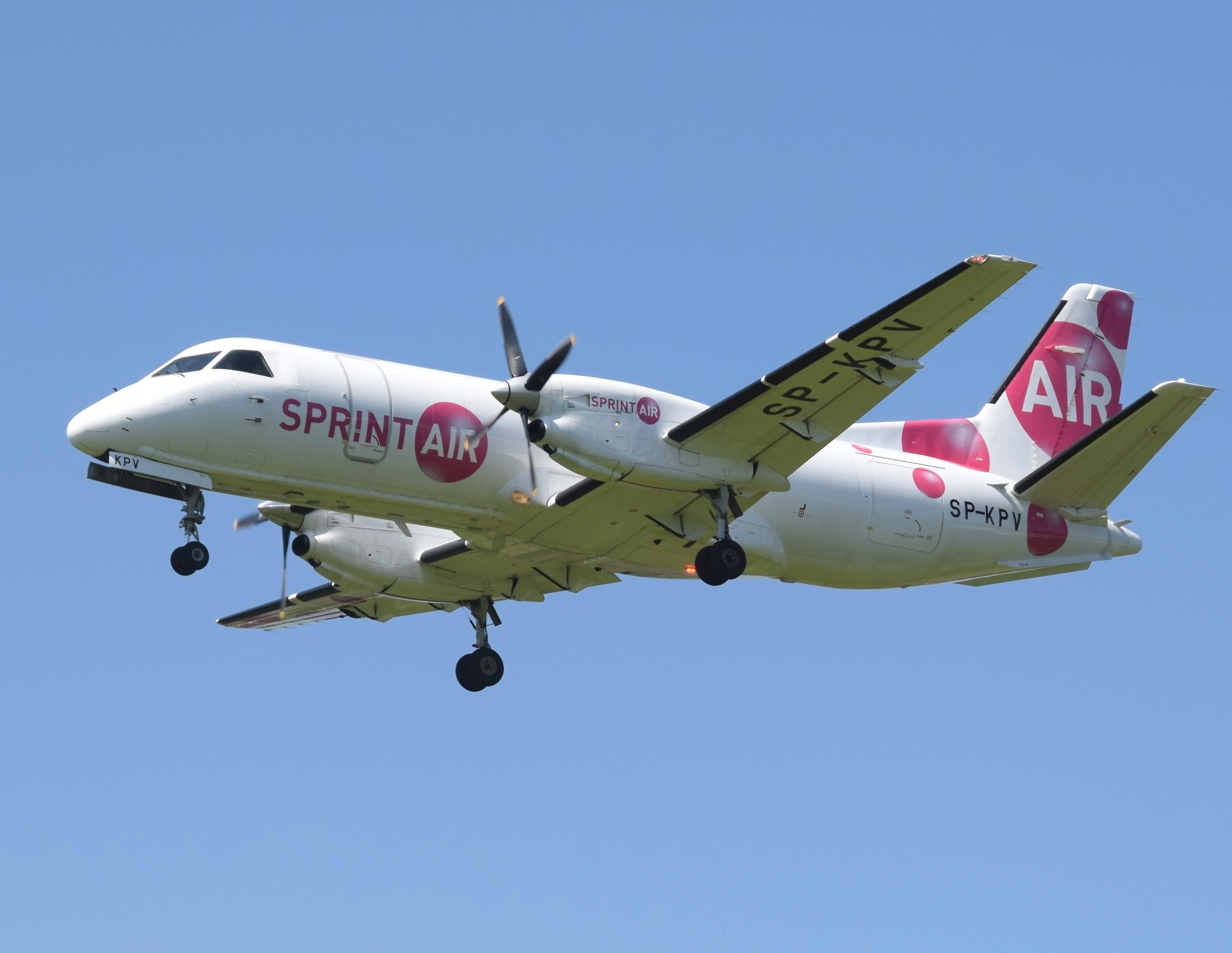
SprintAir freighter with obstructed windows

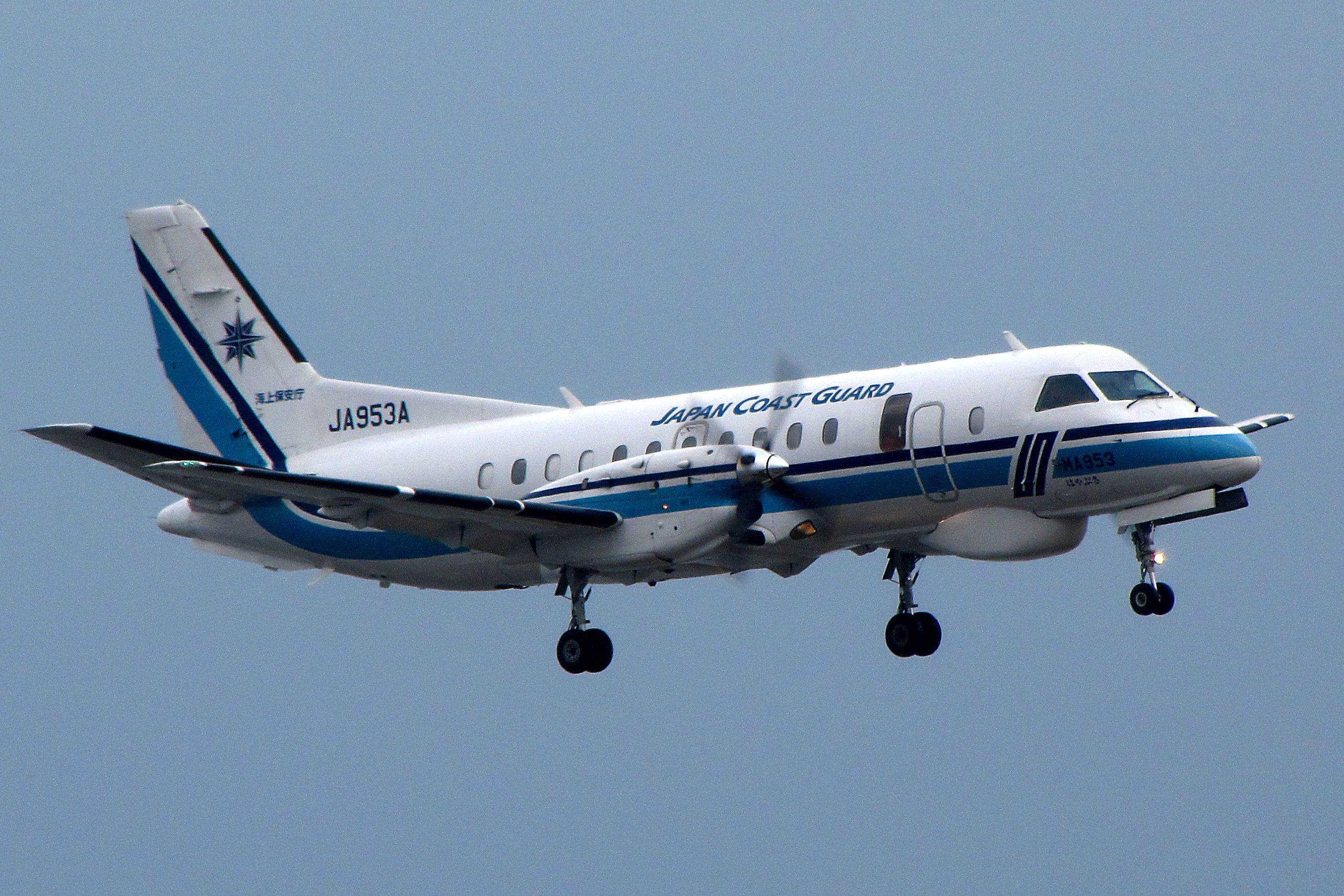
Japan Coast Guard SAR variant with ventral radome

Saab 340A
30- to 36-seat commuter airliner, powered by two 1,735shp (1215kW) General-Electric CT7-5A2 turboprop engines. (340A-001 to 340A-159) available in passenger, VIP and cargo.
Saab 340AF
A modified commercial cargo version of the Saab 340A. Launch customer was Castle Aviation in 2004.
Saab 340B
33- to 36-seat commuter airliner, powered by two 1,870shp (1394kW) General-Electric CT7-9B turboprop engines. (340B-160 to 340B-359)
Saab 340BF
A modified commercial cargo version of the Saab 340B
Saab Tp 100
VIP transport version of the Saab 340B and B Plus for the Swedish Air Force.
Saab Tp 100A
VIP transport version of the Saab 340B
Saab OS 100
Single Tp 100A modified into an Open Skies aircraft.
Saab 340B Plus
Improved version of the Saab 340B. Some have extended wingtips. (340B-360 to 340B-459)
Saab 340B plus SAR-200
Maritime search and rescue version for the Japan Coast Guard. Extended Wingtips fitted.
Saab 340A QC
Quick-change freight transport version

- TP 100C

Saab 340 AEW&C
Airborne early warning and control (AEW&C) version
Saab 340 MSA
Maritime Security Aircraft for multi-role surveillance for detection, classification and identification of maritime contacts and can also be used as a Search-And-Rescue aircraft. Can be fitted with an auxiliary fuel tank for extended operation.
Saab 340B ISR
The aircraft fitted for intelligence, surveillance and reconnaissance missions also served as a demonstrator for the Saab 340 MSA platform. The 340B ISR variant features an AESA radar, a Wescam MX-15 imaging system mounted under the rear fuselage, while an MX-20 system is mounted under the forward fuselage. Since 2019, the sole aircraft is operated by CAE Aviation.
B.L.17
(Thai: บ.ล.๑๗) Royal Thai Armed Forces designation for the Saab 340B.

A stretched, and significantly faster, derivative of the aircraft, designated as the Saab 2000, was also developed and produced during the 1990s.

== Operators ==
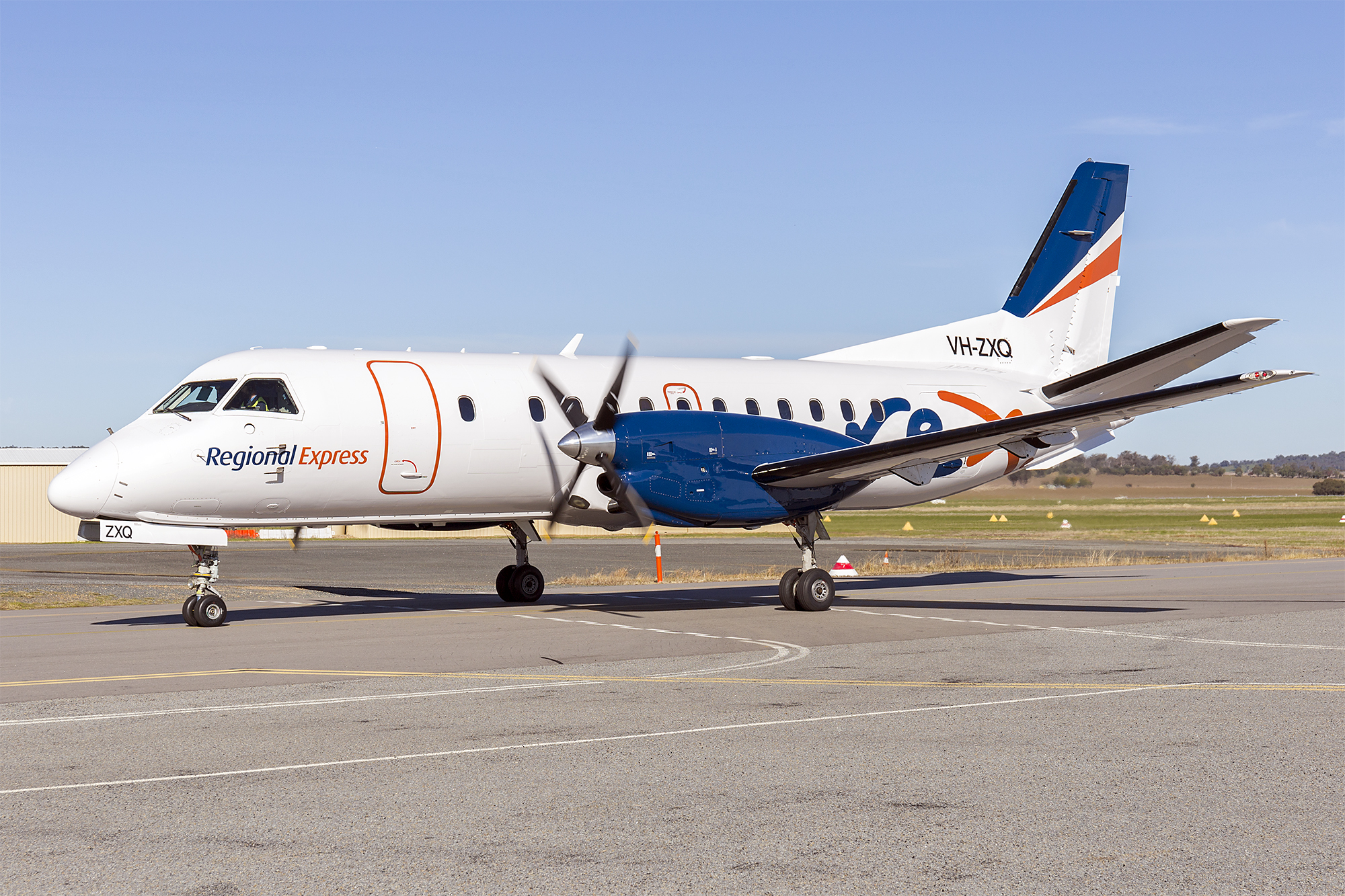
Saab 340 operated by Rex Airlines in 2019

As of 2023, around 250 Saab 340s remained in active service worldwide. Major cargo and regional operators have included Rex Airlines, SprintAir, Link Airways, Pacific Coastal Airlines, Ameriflight, and Castle Aviation.

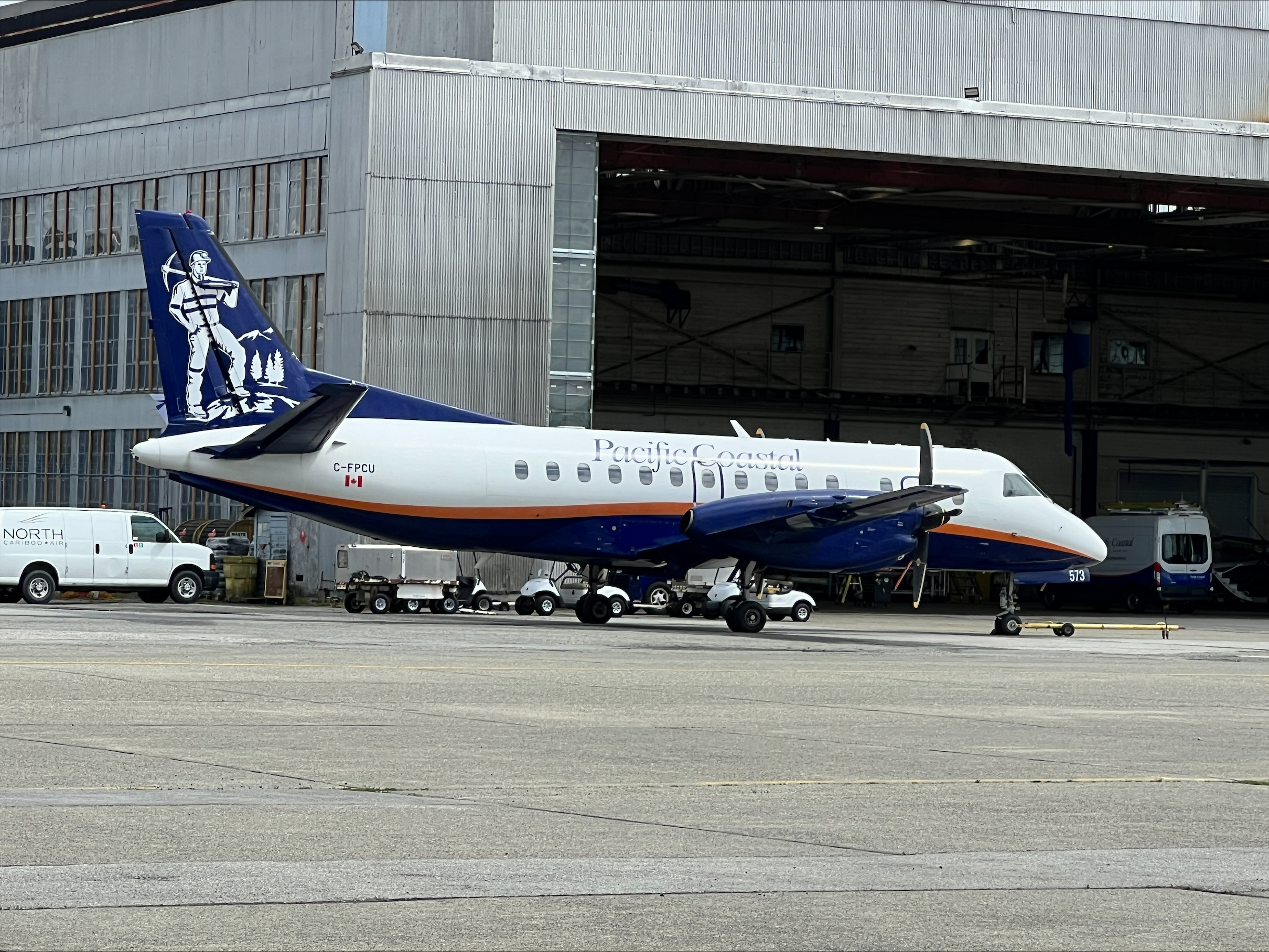
Saab 340 by Pacific Coastal Airlines at YVR by Andres Estepa R.

In December 2016, the fleet average was at 35,277 h and 39,446 cycles – a mean 0.89h per flight, less than halfway of its remaining life: the airframe life has been extended from 45,000 to 80,000 flight hours and 90,000 cycles, potentially allowing for up to 30 years of additional service. Fleet leaders were at 71,268 cycles and 61,867h.

== Accidents and incidents ==
Between 1983 and 2013, there were 13 hull-loss accidents involving the Saab 340 series aircraft, resulting in the deaths of 48 people.

=== Accidents with fatalities ===
- 4 April 1994: KLM Cityhopper Flight 433 stalled and struck the ground while returning to Amsterdam Airport Schiphol. The pilots incorrectly believed there was a problem with one of their engines. The aircraft broke apart on impact. Three people were killed.
- 19 March 1998: Formosa Airlines Flight 7623, a Saab 340B crashed into the ocean 11 km off the city of Hsinchu in Taiwan, caused by electrical fault and disorientation of crew. 13 people killed.
- 10 January 2000: After taking off from Zürich Airport, Crossair Flight 498 banked steeply and entered a high-speed spiral dive, crashing into a field in Niederhasli. All ten people on board were killed.
- 18 May 2011: Sol Líneas Aéreas Flight 5428 en route from Neuquén to Comodoro Rivadavia, a Saab 340A (LV-CEJ), crashed in Prahuaniyeu, Rio Negro Province, Argentina, causing 22 fatalities.

=== Hull losses ===
- 21 February 1990: The undercarriage was accidentally retracted on a Crossair Saab 340A, registration HB-AHA, on the apron at Zürich Airport. No fatalities, aircraft destroyed. The captain involved (Hans Ulrich Lutz) was killed in Crossair Flight 3597 in 2001.
- 2 January 1993: Express Airlines Saab 340A crashed hard onto the runway at Chisholm-Hibbing Municipal Airport due to wing ice accretion. No fatalities, aircraft destroyed.
- 14 May 1997: Pilots of Regional Líneas Aéreas 340B landing at Francisco de Sá Carneiro Airport were not aware of runway construction work. Aircraft ploughed through trench, shearing off the undercarriage. No deaths.
- 21 March 2000: American Eagle Airlines 340B overshot the runway at Killeen Municipal Airport, crashing into a ditch.
- 6 September 2001: Aerolitoral Airlines 340B made an emergency belly landing in farmland after running out of fuel near the Las Palmas River, in Mexico. No fatalities. Aircraft written off and scrapped.
- 8 June 2005: Shuttle America 340A, operating as United Express Airlines reported undercarriage problems on approach to Washington Dulles International Airport. Undercarriage collapsed on landing, aircraft skidded off the runway, and onto grass. No fatalities, aircraft damaged beyond repair.
- 13 June 2013: SkyBahamas Airlines Flight 9561 from Fort Lauderdale to Marsh Harbour attempted to land on Marsh Harbour's runway 09 but touched down hard, bounced four times until the right wing detached, and veered right, off the runway. The Saab SF-340B came to a stop with the right wing fractured and right main gear collapsed. There were no injuries, but the aircraft incurred substantial damage.

== Specifications (340B) ==
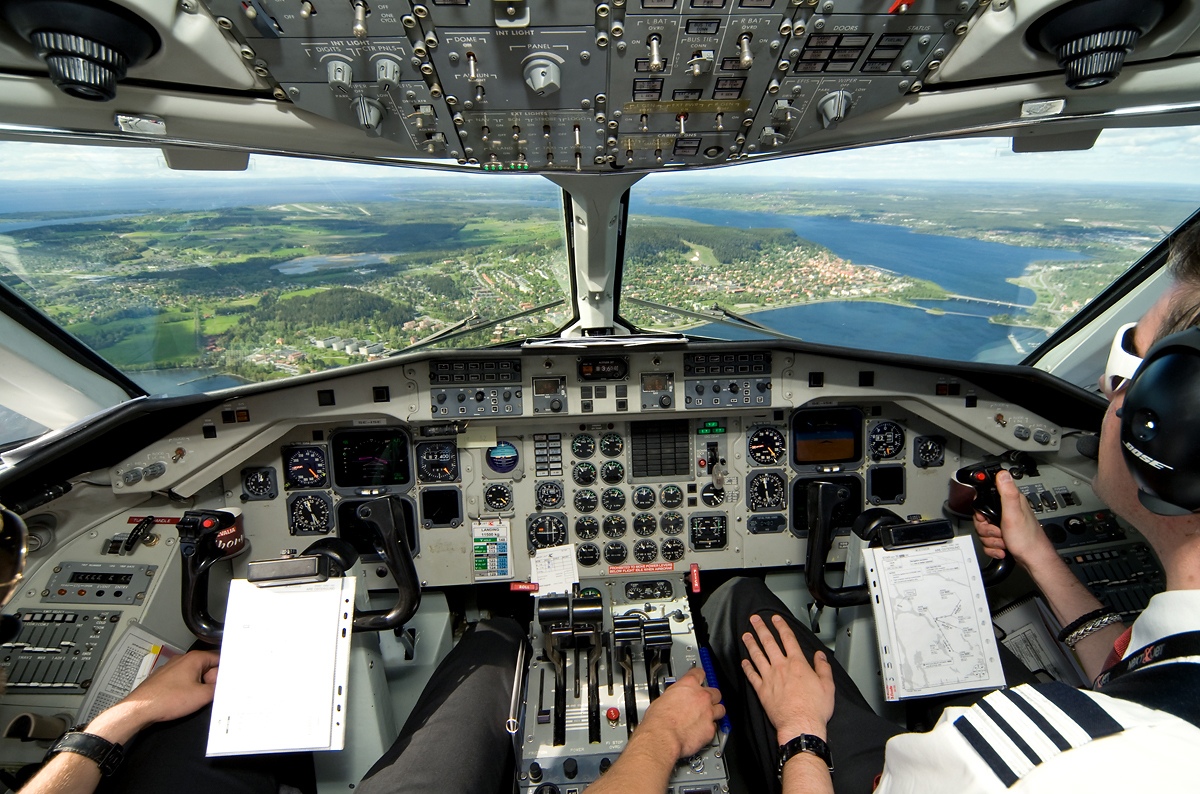
Cockpit in flight

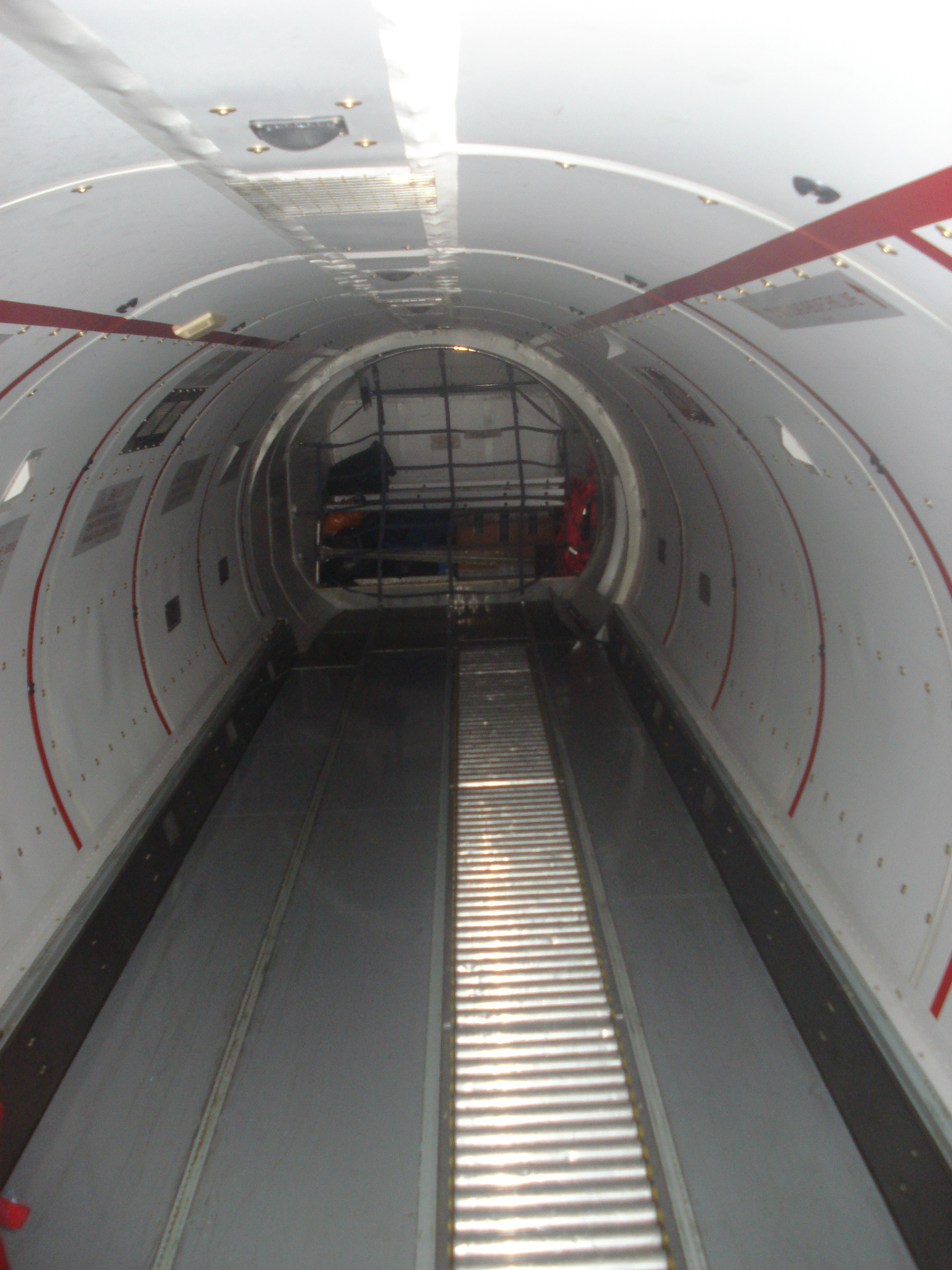
Freighter interior

Data from SAAB

General characteristics

- Crew: 2 pilots
- Capacity: 34 passengers, Maximum payload : 7500 lb / 3400 kg
- Length: 19.73 m (64 ft 9 in)
- Wingspan: 21.44 m (70 ft 4 in)
- Height: 6.97 m (22 ft 10 in)
- Wing area: 41.81 m^{2} (450.0 sq ft)
- Airfoil: root: NASA MS(1)-0316; tip: NASA MS(1)-0312
- Empty weight: 8,618 kg (19,000 lb) average operational empty weight
- Max takeoff weight: 13,154 kg (29,000 lb) , increased to 30,000 pounds for 340B models by SAAB Service Bulletin (SB) 340-51-033 with Modification Number 3655
- Fuel capacity: 5690 lb / 2580 kg
- Powerplant: 2 × General Electric CT7-9B turboprop engines, 1,390 kW (1,870 shp) each for take-off (ISA, APR)
- Propellers: 4-bladed Hamilton Standard 14RF19 (or Dowty Rotol), 3.35 m (11 ft 0 in) diameter four-blade constant speed, fully-feathering reversible propellers

Performance

- Cruise speed: 524 km/h (326 mph, 283 kn)
- Range: 1,350 km (840 mi, 730 nmi) long range cruise with 34 passengers and baggage
- Service ceiling: 7,620 m (25,000 ft)
- Rate of climb: 10.2 m/s (2,010 ft/min)
- Fuel consumption: 0.94 kg/km (3.3 lb/mi)
- Take-off distance: 4220 ft / 1285 m

Avionics

- Rockwell Collins EFD-86 CRT displays
- Rockwell Collins APS-85 autopilot
- Hamilton Sundstrand Ground Proximity Warning System
- Rockwell Collins VHF communications unit
- Universal FMS
- Lockheed Martin cockpit voice recorder
- Lockheed Martin flight data recorder

== See also ==
Related development

- Saab 340 AEW&C
- Saab 2000

Aircraft of comparable role, configuration, and era

- Embraer EMB 120 Brasilia
- DHC-8 100/200
- Fokker 50
- ATR 42
- Dornier 328
- BAe Jetstream 41

Related lists

- List of civil aircraft
