= Eugenio María de Hostos Airport =

Airport in Mayagüez, Puerto Rico

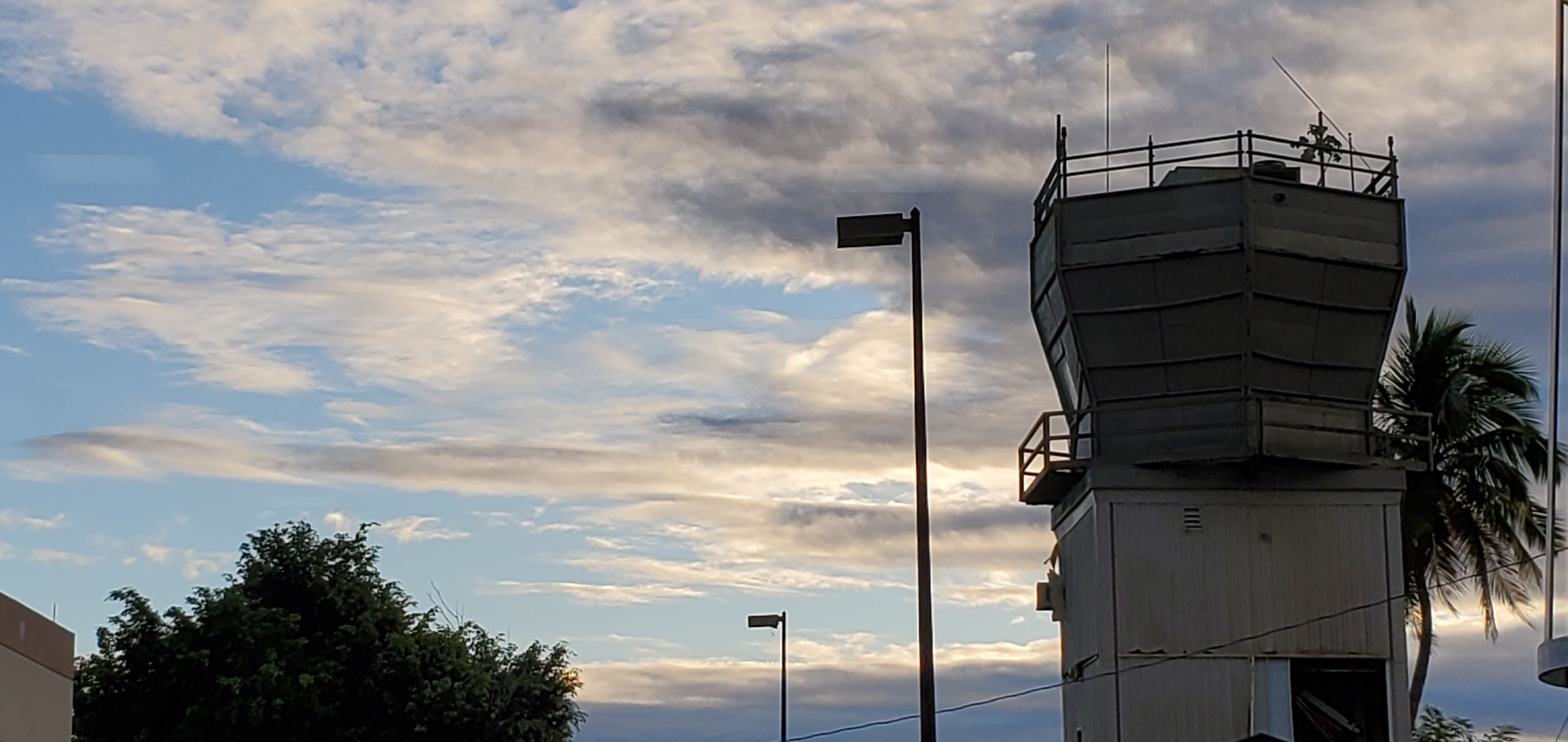
- IATA: MAZ; ICAO: TJMZ; FAA LID: MAZ

Summary
- Airport type: Public
- Owner: Puerto Rico Ports Authority
- Serves: Mayagüez, Puerto Rico
- Elevation AMSL: 27 ft (8.2 m)
- Coordinates: 18°15′20″N 67°08′54″W

Map
- Location of airport in Puerto Rico

Runways
Direction	Length		Surface
Direction	ft	m	Surface
9/27	4,998	1,523	Asphalt
- Sources: FAA GCM Google Maps

Eugenio María de Hostos Airport (IATA: MAZ, ICAO: TJMZ, FAA LID: MAZ) is a public use airport 4 miles (6 km) north of Mayagüez, a coastal city in Puerto Rico. The airport is named after Mayagüez native Eugenio Maria de Hostos. It offers limited, domestic commercial service, subsidized by the Essential Air Service program.

== History ==
Eugenio María de Hostos Airport used to be the main air gateway to the western region of Puerto Rico, until Rafael Hernández Airport in Aguadilla took over that position.

The airport was served during the 1960s from San Juan by Caribair, and then, rather heavily, by the Puerto Rican national air carrier, Prinair, during the 1970s and early 1980s. At one point, Prinair served Las Americas International Airport in Santo Domingo, Dominican Republic with De Havilland Heron aircraft from Mayaguez, making the airport an international one. It took the airport three years to get commercial service again after Prinair went bankrupt in 1984. American Eagle opened service from Luis Muñoz Marín International Airport in 1987, and Eastern Air Lines, not to be outdone by their rival American's feeder carrier, soon began services there too, with their own feeder airline, Eastern Metro Express.

Although the airport has always been a turbo-prop aircraft airport, Pan Am announced, in 2002, intentions to install jet flights between Mayagüez and Las Américas International Airport in Santo Domingo, Dominican Republic, with Boeing 727s. Those plans never became a reality, but in 2003, the airport regained its international status, when Fina Air picked up the route to Santo Domingo. Fina Air has since gone out of business.

On November 8, 2004, American Eagle filed a 90-day notice of intent to the DOT to end service to Mayagüez on February 5, 2005 due to poor loads. MAZ is an Essential Air Service market therefore American Eagle's service was extended by the DOT until the newly selected carrier, Cape Air, began operations. American Eagle ended operations on April 30, 2005.

== Facilities and aircraft ==
Eugenio María de Hostos Airport covers an area of 172 acres (70 ha) at an elevation of 28 feet (9 m) above mean sea level. It has one runway designated 9/27 with an asphalt surface measuring 4,998 by 100 feet (1,523 x 30 m).

== Airline and destination ==
Airlines	Destinations
Cape Air	San Juan–LMM

== Statistics ==
Passenger statistics for MAZ
Year	Passengers	% Change	Year	Passengers	% Change	Year	Passengers	% Change
2001	93,883	–	2009	16,767	▼13.8%	2017	15,281	▲25.9%
2002	65,858	▼29.9%	2010	12,568	▼25.0%	2018	16,123	▲5.5%
2003	55,869	▼15.2%	2011	11,866	▼5.6%	2019	16,670	▲3.4%
2004	55,702	▼0.3%	2012	13,569	▲14.4%	2020	10,015	▼39.9%
2005	28,194	▼49.4%	2013	12,909	▼4.9%	2021	12,744	▲27.2%
2006	19,572	▼30.6%	2014	14,499	▲12.3%	2022	17,005	▲33.4%
2007	19,580	▲0.0%	2015	13,290	▼8.3%	2023	18,849	▲10.8%
2008	19,447	▼0.7%	2016	12,135	▼8.7%	2024	20,249	▲7.4%

== Accidents and incidents ==
- American Eagle Flight 5452 crashed while landing on May 8, 1987, killing two and damaging the airport perimeter fence.
- On June 7, 1992, American Eagle Flight 5456, a CASA C-212 aircraft from San Juan crashed one mile short of runway 9, killing all five people on board.
- A 24-year-old pilot, Jose O. Torres Lopez, sustained an eye injury when his Piper Cub aircraft, carrying him and one passenger, was overthrown by wind after landing at the airport on Saturday, March 1, 2014. The airplane was also damaged.

== See also ==
- Transport in Puerto Rico
- List of airports in Puerto Rico
