= Los Menucos =

- Municipio
- Location of Los Menucos in Río Negro and Argentina
- Coordinates: 40.817°S 68.117°W
- Country: Argentina
- Province: Río Negro
- Department: Veinticinco de Mayo
- Established: 1927

Government
  - Intendente: Mabel Yahuar (UCR)
- Elevation: 803 m (2,635 ft)

Population (2001)
  - Total: 2,689
- Time zone: UTC−3 (ART)
- Postal code: R8426
- Area code: 02940
- Climate: BSk

Los Menucos is a village and municipality in Río Negro Province in Argentina. On May 18, 2011, Sol Líneas Aéreas Flight 5428 crashed near the village and municipality. All 22 people on board died along with a baby.
