= 2017 in aviation =

This is a list of aviation-related events in 2017.

== Events ==
=== January ===
12 January

- Iran receives the first of 100 Airbus airliners it purchased after signing the Joint Comprehensive Plan of Action for its nuclear program in 2015. The first aircraft is an Airbus A321 that arrives at Tehran, completing its delivery flight from Toulouse, France. The arrival of the A321 is the first step in Iran's plan to recapitalize its aging civil aviation fleet, which has received few new aircraft since the Iran's Islamic Revolution of 1979. Plans also call for Iran to begin taking delivery in 2018 of 80 Boeing airliners it ordered.

16 January

- After a missed approach in thick fog while attempting to land at Manas International Airport in Bishkek, Kyrgyzstan, Turkish Airlines Flight 6491, a Boeing 747-412F cargo aircraft (registration TC-MCL) belonging to and crewed by MyCargo Airlines, crashes in the village of Dachi Suu while attempting a go-around, killing all four people on the plane and 35 people on the ground, and injuring 36 people on the ground. The plane, breaking into pieces, plows through several hundred meters of the town, destroying at least 32 houses and damaging dozens of buildings.

17 January

- Australia, China, and Malaysia announce that they have suspended indefinitely the underwater search they have led for Malaysian Airlines Flight 370, a Boeing 777 that disappeared on 8 March 2014 with 239 people on board. The most complex and expensive search effort in aviation history, searchers using sonar towfish and unmanned submarines have covered 120,000 km (46,000 square miles) of the Indian Ocean about 1,100 miles (1,800 km) west of Australia over more than 34 months at a cost of between US$150 million and US$160 million without finding any trace of the airliner or its passengers or crew. Rejecting a December 2016 Australian Transport Safety Bureau suggestion that the search zone move 200 miles (320 km) farther north, the three countries announce that they do not plan to resume the search unless convincing new evidence surfaces that identifies the likely location of the aircraft.

=== February ===
17 February

- Boeing rolls out the newest version of its Boeing 787 Dreamliner airliner, the Boeing 787-10, in a ceremony at Charleston International Airport in South Carolina.

=== March ===
4 March

- Families of the passengers of Malaysian Airlines Flight 370 – a Boeing 777 with 239 people on board missing since 8 March 2014 – announce that they have begun a campaign to raise funds to pay for a private search for the plane, hoping to raise US$15 million for a search in a 25,000-square-kilometer (9,700-square-mile) area in the Indian Ocean to the north of previous search areas. Speaking at the remembrance event at a shopping mall near Kuala Lumpur, Malaysia, at which the families announce the new effort, Malaysian Minister of Transport Liow Tiong Lai claims that there is an 85 percent chance that the missing plane will be found in the new search area. The governments of Australia, the People's Republic of China, and Malaysia had called off their two-year, US$160 million search for the airliner on 17 January.

14 March

- A Sikorsky S-92A helicopter (registration EI-ICR, call sign "Rescue 116") operated by CHC Helicopter under contract to the Irish Coast Guard crashes into the Atlantic Ocean during a rescue mission off County Mayo, Ireland, killing two crew members and leaving its other two crew members injured.

29 March

- The largest variant of the Embraer E-Jet E2 family, the E195-E2, makes its first flight. The flight, previously scheduled for the second half of 2017, takes place ahead of schedule.

31 March

- The A319neo, the smallest variant of the Airbus A320neo family, makes its first flight, powered by CFM International LEAP engines.
- The Antonov/Taqnia An-132, an improved version of the Antonov An-32 twin-turboprop military transport aircraft, makes its maiden flight.
- The Boeing 787-10, the largest variant of the Boeing 787 Dreamliner, makes its first flight.

=== April ===
3 April

- Boeing announces a tentative agreement to sell 30 Boeing 737 MAX airliners to Iran's Iran Aseman Airlines for a total of US$3,000,000,000, with the airline also holding rights to purchase an additional 30 Boeing 737 MAX aircraft for an additional US$3,000,000,000. Deliveries are to begin in 2022.

5 April

- Zunum Aero announces that it is working with Boeing HorizonX and JetBlue Technology Ventures to develop electric aircraft that could compete with private automobiles, trains, and buses on trips of up to 1,000 miles (1,600 km) in terms both of operating costs for airlines and the cost and time of travel for passengers. The company envisions electric aircraft capable of seating 10 to 50 passengers that would operate at lower speeds and altitudes than current commercial aircraft but allow airlines to operate profitably from local airports that had lost airline service as airlines consolidated passengers onto larger aircraft to save on operating costs. The company also envisions the new generation of aircraft drawing people away from cars, buses, and trains by allowing airlines to offer lower fares and by operating from general aviation airports with passengers loading their baggage into the planes directly from their cars without going through time-consuming security lines or having to change planes at airline hubs. Zunum Aero hopes its aircraft can begin service by the early 2020s, although some independent observers doubt that such service could begin before 2030 and perhaps not before 2050.

9 April

- After no one volunteers to give up his or her seat to make room aboard overbooked United Express Flight 3411 – an Embraer 170 with 70 passengers aboard operated by Republic Airline boarding at O'Hare International Airport in Chicago, Illinois, for a flight to Louisville, Kentucky – to make room for four United Airlines employees requiring transportation to Louisville, United employees select four passengers to be involuntarily bumped from the flight. Three comply, but the fourth, David Dao, refuses. After United employees deem Dao "disruptive" and "belligerent," Chicago Department of Aviation security officers board the plane, slam a screaming Dao's head against an armrest, and drag him from his seat, apparently unconscious. After the United employees take the vacated seats, Dao reboards the airliner with a bloody face, collapses, and is removed on a stretcher. The incident is captured on video and causes outrage. Although United chief executive officer Oscar Munoz initially defends his employees' actions, he apologizes two days later and promises such an incident will not occur again.

13 April

- The largest variant yet of the Boeing 737 MAX, the Boeing 737 MAX 9, makes its first flight, taking off from Renton Municipal Airport in Renton, Washington, and landing at Boeing Field in Seattle, Washington, after a flight of 2 hours 42 minutes. It is due to enter service in 2018.

20 April

- Leased by GECAS, the first A321neo is delivered in Hamburg, Germany, to Virgin America, configured with 184 seats and LEAP engines. Virgin America expects to place it in service on 31 May.
- AeroMobil s.r.o. unveils the production model of its AeroMobil flying car at Top Marques Monaco in Monte Carlo, Monaco, and announces that it plans to begin to take preorders for the vehicle before the end of 2017.

22 April

- Uber announced plans to launch a flying taxi service called Elevate using extremely quiet, pilotless, autonomous, electric-powered VTOL vehicles capable of carrying four passengers, with takeoffs and landings to take place at "vertiports" located in large cities, perhaps on the tops of buildings. Uber hopes that Elevate will begin operations by 2023 and perhaps as soon as 2020, followed by a full-scale rollout by 2027. Dallas, Texas, has already committed to hosting the initial Elevate operations, and Uber hopes that Dubai also will participate when Elevate is introduced. Uber has approached Aurora Flight Sciences, Bell Helicopter, Embraer, the Mooney International Corporation, and Pipistrel for designs for the proposed VTOL vehicle.

27 April

- Honolulu International Airport in Honolulu, Hawaii, is renamed Daniel K. Inouye International Airport.

29 April

- Boeing files a dumping petition at the United States International Trade Commission for the sale of 75 Bombardier CSeries CS100 to Delta Air Lines at $19.6m each, below their $33.2m production cost.

=== May ===
1 May

- Airlink makes the first commercial airline flight with paying passengers in history to Saint Helena in the South Atlantic Ocean, a charter flight from Cape Town, South Africa, via Moçâmedes, Angola, to Saint Helena Airport using an Avro RJ85 to pick up passengers stranded when the island's only link with the outside world, the British Royal Mail Ship RMS St Helena, suffers propeller damage. The flight returns to Cape Town the same day with a stop at Windhoek, Namibia. No commercial airliner lands at Saint Helena Airport again until October, when Airlink begins the first scheduled commercial airline service in the island's history.

5 May

- At Shanghai Pudong International Airport in Shanghai, China, before a crowd of 3,000 people, the first modern Chinese passenger jet, the Comac C919 (registration B-001A), makes its first flight, carrying five pilots and engineers. The airliner is intended to compete with the Boeing 737 and Airbus A320. Comac plans a test program of 4,200 flight hours before China Eastern Airlines introduces the C919 into service in 2019.

10 May

- Five days before it is scheduled to make its first delivery of its new Boeing 737 MAX airliner to a customer, Boeing halts test flights and grounds the aircraft due to quality problems in a large metal disc used in the low-pressure turbine at the rear of the aircraft's CFM International LEAP-1B engines.

16 May

- The first Boeing 737 MAX, a 737 MAX 8, is delivered to Malindo Air, which plans to debut it in revenue service.

27 May

- Goma Air Flight 409, a Let L-410 Turbolet, registration 9N-AKY, crashes when it lost altitude on final approach in poor visibility on final approach to runway 06 of Tenzing–Hillary Airport in Lukla, Nepal, about 14:04 Local Time (08:19Z) and contacted a tree short of the runway before impacting ground about 3 metres (10 ft) below runway threshold level. The captain was killed on impact and the first officer died in hospital almost eight hours later. The third crew member received injuries and was evacuated to Kathmandu the following day after the weather had cleared.
- A major computer outage blamed on a power failure forces British Airways to cancel all flights at Heathrow Airport and Gatwick Airport in the London area. The outage prevents departures from and transfer between flights at the airports, disrupting flights worldwide. Although service will resume on 28 May, delays and cancellations will linger into 29 May.

31 May

- The Scaled Composites Stratolaunch, an aircraft designed to launch rockets into space from high altitude, is rolled out of its hangar for the first time at Mojave Air and Space Port in Mojave, California. Its 385-foot (117-meter) wingspan is the largest in history.

=== June ===
7 June

- A Myanmar Air Force Shaanxi Y-8 making a domestic flight in Myanmar from Myeik to Yangon crashes into the Andaman Sea from an altitude of 18,000 feet (5,500 meters), killing all 122 people on board.

9 June

- The United States International Trade Commission estimate the U.S. industry could be threatened by the Cseries dumping petitioned by Boeing as the U.S. Department of Commerce continue to conduct its investigations for initial reports in July 2017 and antidumping determination due in October 2017.

16 June

- At Novosibirsk in Russia, an Ilyushin Il-2 Sturmovik makes its first flight since 25 November 1943, when it had made a forced landing on frozen Lake Krivoye near Murmansk in the Soviet Union while operating with the 46th Attack Air Regiment of the Soviet Navy's Northern Fleet Air Force. It had broken through the ice and sunk, but had been recovered in December 2011 and restored. It becomes one of only two flyable IL-2s.

19 June

- At the Paris Air Show, Boom Technology announces plans to develop a 45-passenger supersonic airliner capable of flying from New York City to London in 2 1/2 hours, from San Francisco to Tokyo in 5 1/2 hours, and from Los Angeles to Sydney in just under seven hours, in all three cases cutting current flight times in half. Boom hopes to have the new airliner – which will offer only first- and business-class seating – in service by no later than 2023 if it receives all required certifications. Boom also announces that Virgin Atlantic has ordered 10 of the airliners, four other airlines have ordered another 66, and that it will announce orders by an additional four airlines in the next few months.

21 June

- At the Paris Air Show, Boeing has received orders for or expressions of interest in ordering 370 aircraft worth $52,000,000,000 since 19 June, including a boost in interest in its Boeing 737 MAX 10 airliner. Airbus has posted sales of 229 airliners worth $25,000,000,000 at the show over the same period. The combined total of $77,000,000,000 in airliner deals passes the $50,000,000,000 in deals at the 2016 Farnborough Airshow in England.

22 June

- At Caldwell Industrial Airport in Caldwell, Idaho, Republic P-47 Thunderbolt 42-29150, named Dottie Mae by its primary World War II pilot, makes its first flight since 8 May 1945, when it had crashed into the Traunsee in Germany, the last P-47 lost in Europe during World War II. Recovered in June 2005 and restored, it becomes the only flyable P-47 with a combat record.

=== July ===
7 July

- In the evening, Air Canada Flight 759, an Airbus A320-211 carrying 135 people, nearly lands on a San Francisco International Airport taxiway occupied by four loaded airliners waiting for takeoff. The Air Canada plane is able to initiate a climb, narrowly missing the planes by metres. The incident spurs a U.S. National Transportation Safety Board investigation.

10 July

- A United States Marine Corps Lockheed Martin KC-130T tanker aircraft nicknamed Triple Nuts of Marine Aerial Refueler Transport Squadron 452 (VMGR-452) breaks up at an altitude of 20,000 feet (6,100 meters) over Leflore County, Mississippi, 85 miles (137 km) north of Jackson, Mississippi, and crashes, spreading debris over a 5-mile (8-km) radius and killing all 16 people – one United States Navy and 15 U.S. Marine Corps personnel – aboard.

=== August ===
15 August

- Air Berlin, Germany's second largest airline, with 85 destinations, 8,000 employees, and 72 aircraft, files for bankruptcy.

16 August

- The CASA C212-derived Indonesian Aerospace N-219 light aircraft makes its maiden flight in Bandung, Indonesia.

=== September ===
2 September

- Flying the modified P-51D-25BA Mustang Voodoo over Clarks Ranch, Idaho, Steve Hinton Jr., sets a new world speed record for a piston-engine aircraft over a 3-km (1.863-mile) closed circuit, achieving an average speed over four laps of 531.53 mph (855.41 km/h), although the Fédération Aéronautique Internationale does not accept it as displacing the previous record because of a requirement that a new record exceed the previous one by at least one percent in order to displace it, which would have required an average speed of at least 533.6 mph (858.7 km/h). During one lap, Hinton sets an absolute world speed record for a C-1e-class piston-engine aircraft, reaching 554.69 mph (892.69 km/h).

3 September

- Piloting the Windward Performance Perlan II, Jim Payne and Morgan Sandercock establish a new absolute glider world altitude record, reaching an altitude of 52,172 feet (15,902 meters) near El Calafate, Argentina. They break the previous record set in August 2006 by 1,502 feet (458 meters).

30 September

- Air France Flight 66, an Airbus A380-861 (registration F-HPJE) with 520 people on board flying from Paris, France, to Los Angeles, California, suffers an uncontained failure of its No. 4 engine while flying near Greenland at 37,000 feet (11,000 meters). It makes an emergency landing at Canadian Forces Base Goose Bay in Newfoundland and Labrador, Canada.

=== October ===
1 October

- After the Cseries dumping petition by Boeing, the United States Department of Commerce moves to impose an 80 percent tariff on imported Canadian airliners, based on a Boeing complaint that Bombardier Aerospace deliberately violated international trade law in a 2016 sale of 75 Bombardier CS100 airliners to Delta Air Lines. The move, which is a separate action from the Commerce Department's 26 September decision to impose a 219 percent tariff on Bombardier Aerospace aircraft, would in combination with the 219 percent tariff quadruple the price of Bombardier Aerospace airliners in the United States and effectively price Bombardier Aerospace out of the U.S. market. Imposition of the two tariffs requires a favorable ruling by the United States International Trade Commission in a review scheduled for February 2018.

14 October

- The first scheduled commercial airline service in history to Saint Helena in the South Atlantic Ocean begins as an Airlink Embraer E190-100IGW with 78 passengers aboard arrives at Saint Helena Airport after a flight of about six hours from Johannesburg, South Africa, with a stop at Windhoek, Namibia. The flight inaugurates once-a-week scheduled service between Johannesburg and Saint Helena. Previously, with the exception of a single charter flight Airlink made in May, the island had relied for its connection with the outside world on visits once every three weeks by a British Royal Mail Ship, the cargo liner RMS St Helena, making a six-day voyage between South Africa and Saint Helena. Boosters hope the flights will establish Saint Helena as a tourist destination, but critics maintain that more extensive commercial service will be necessary to make the construction of the airport worthwhile.
- An Antonov An-26 operated by the Moldovan airline Valan International Cargo Charter, chartered by the French government in support of Operation Barkhane, crashes in the sea off Abidjan, Ivory Coast, killing four and injuring six more.

16 October

- Airbus and Bombardier Aerospace announce a partnership on the CSeries program, with Airbus acquiring a 50.01% majority stake, Bombardier keeping 31% and Investissement Québec 19%, to expand in an estimated market of more than 6,000 new 100-150 seat aircraft over 20 years. Airbus' supply chain expertise should save production costs but headquarters and assembly remain in Québec while U.S. customers would benefit from a second assembly line in Mobile, Alabama. This transaction is subject to regulatory approvals and is expected to be completed in 2018. While assembling the aircraft in U.S. could circumvent the 300% duties proposed in the Cseries dumping petition by Boeing, Airbus CEO Tom Enders and Bombardier CEO Alain Bellemare assured that this factor did not drive the partnership, but negotiations began in August after the April 2017 filing and the June decision to proceed and, as a result, Boeing was suspicious.

17 October

- After carrying only 13 percent of intra-Hawaii seats in the first three-quarters of 2017 – competing against Hawaiian Airlines, which carried 80 percent – and posting an operating loss of US$4.9 million and a net loss of US$8.2 million for the second quarter of 2017, Hawaii Island Air files for Chapter 11 bankruptcy protection after it fails to find new investors to satisfy lessors Wells Fargo Bank Northwest and Elix 8, who want to repossess its five Bombardier Q400s. It will cease operations on 11 November.

18 October

- The Saudi budget airline Flynas inaugurates the first direct commercial air service between Saudi Arabia and Iraq since the outbreak of the Gulf War in August 1990. The first flight departs from Riyadh and arrives in Baghdad.

19 October

- The re-engined Airbus A330neo-900 makes its first flight at Toulouse, France.

=== November ===
7 November

- United Airlines operates its last Boeing 747 flight, United Airlines Flight 747 from San Francisco International Airport to Daniel K. Inouye International Airport, Honolulu. The sold-out 374-seat flight aboard a Boeing 747-400 retraces the path of the first United Airlines Boeing 747 flight 47 years earlier in 1970. Boeing's retirement of the aircraft leaves Delta Air Lines as the only remaining U.S. operator of the Boeing 747.

8 November

- ATR launches the freighter variant of the ATR 72-600 with 30 firm orders plus 20 options from FedEx Express.

11 November

- Hawaii Island Air ceases all operations after 37 years of service between Hawaii's islands. It had filed for Chapter 11 bankruptcy protection on 17 October.

12 November

- The Dubai Air Show, the third largest air show in the world by number of exhibitors, square meters, and visitors, opens, displaying 160 aircraft for 72,000 expected visitors. Airbus displays the A350-900 and A319 airliners and the A400M and C-295 military airlifters, while Beriev displays its Be-200ES jet amphibian, Boeing the 737 MAX 8 and 787-10 jetliners, Bombardier Aerospace the Bombardier CS300 small narrowbody, Embraer its Phenom 100 small business jet, and Sukhoi its Superjet 100 regional jet. The show will run through 16 November.
- At the Dubai Air Show, Emirates commits to purchase 40 Boeing 787-10s in two- and three-class cabins for 240 to 330 passengers, to be delivered from 2022 with conversion rights to the smaller Boeing 787-9, pushing orders for the 787-10 from 171 to over 200.

15 November

- At the Dubai Air Show, Indigo Partners signs a memorandum of understanding for 430 Airbus – 273 A320neos and 157 A321neos – for US$49.5 billion at list prices; Indigo controls Frontier Airlines and JetSmart and holds stakes in Volaris and Wizz Air: 146 will go to Wizz Air, 134 to Frontier Airlines, 80 to Volaris, and 70 to JetSmart.
- At the same air show, Flydubai commits to ordering 175 Boeing 737 Max and 50 purchase rights for $27 billion at list prices: MAX 8s, MAX 9s and 50 Max 10s.

21 November

- The large -1000 variant of the A350 XWB receives its type certification from the EASA and the FAA.

27 November

- In the wake of insolvencies of Alitalia and airBerlin, Swiss Lugano-based regional Darwin Airline, operating six Saab 2000 and four ATR 72, enter insolvency proceedings four months after being acquired in July by Slovenia's Adria Airways owner, Luxembourg's private equity fund 4K Invest, from Etihad which owned one third since 2014.

28 November

- Textron Aviation launches the Cessna SkyCourier, a twin-turboprop, high-wing, large-utility aircraft for an introduction in 2020 with its launch customer FedEx Express which ordered 50 cargo variants and 50 options.
- Airbus announces a partnership with Rolls-Royce and Siemens to develop the E-Fan X hybrid-electric aircraft demonstrator, to fly in 2020.

=== December ===
7 December

- The Pilatus PC-24 receives EASA and FAA type certification, it is anticipated to enter service in January 2018.

13 December

- Austrian leisure carrier Niki grounded flights and entered insolvency proceedings after the European Commission did not cleared the acquisition from insolvent Air Berlin to Lufthansa on competition grounds.
- Dassault abandons the Safran Silvercrest turbofan due to technical and schedule risks, ends the Falcon 5X development and will launch a new Falcon with the same cross section, Pratt & Whitney Canada engines and a 5,500 nmi (10,200 km) range for a 2022 introduction.
- West Wind Aviation Flight 282, an ATR 42-320 registered as C-GWEA, crashed immediately after takeoff. One out of the 25 occupants on board were killed.

14 December

- Delta Air Lines orders 100 Airbus A321neos, with 100 further options for $25.4 billion at list prices, to be delivered from 2020 to 2023; equipped with Pratt & Whitney PW1100Gs and seating 197, they will replace ageing Airbus A320s, Boeing 757-200s and MD-90s.

18 December

- The Bell V-280 Valor makes its first flight : it takes off vertically, hover momentarily then land, without forward flight, its General Electric T64 engines remaining upright.

21 December

- Boeing and Embraer confirmed to be discussing a potential combination with a transaction subject to Brazilian government regulators, the companies' boards and shareholders approvals.

22 December

- The General Electric Advanced Turboprop makes its first ground run.
- After identifying deficiencies in its Operational Control System, Transport Canada suspends the Air Operator Certificate of West Wind Aviation in the wake of its 13 December accident of an ATR 42 at Fond-du-Lac.

23 December

- Austrian general aviation manufacturer Diamond Aircraft Industries is acquired by Chinese Wanfeng Aviation.

24 December

- The Chinese AVIC AG600, the largest amphibious aircraft, makes its maiden flight from Zhuhai Airport in the southern province of Guangdong.

25 December

- The first ACAE CJ-1000AX turbofan demonstrator assembly is completed after an 18-month process before 24 more prototypes support an airworthiness certification campaign to enter service on the Comac C919 after 2021.

29 December

- IAG announces it will buy assets of Niki, previously part of the Air Berlin group, for €20 million for up to 15 A320s and slots at Vienna, Düsseldorf, Munich, Palma and Zurich airports; providing up to €16.5 million in liquidity, 740 former NIKI employees will run an Austrian Vueling subsidiary.

31 December

- A Sydney Seaplanes flight crashes into the Hawkesbury River 30 miles (48 km) north of Sydney Australia, killing all 6 people on board, including an 11-year-old girl and CEO of British foodservice company Compass Group, Richard Cousins.

== First flights ==
=== March ===
- 29 March – Embraer 195-E2 PR-ZIJ
- 31 March
  - Airbus A319neo D-AVWA
  - Antonov/Taqnia An-132 UR-EXK
  - Boeing 787-10 N528ZC

=== April ===
- 13 April – Boeing 737 MAX 9 N7379E

=== May ===
- 5 May – Comac C919 B-001A
- 25 May - Lockheed Martin LM-100J (N5103D)
- 28 May – Irkut MC-21 73051

=== July ===
- 5 July - Dassault Falcon 5X F-WFVX
- 18 July - Lancair Mako (N580L)

=== August ===
- 16 August - Indonesian Aerospace N-219 PK-XDT
- 31 August - Elixir Aircraft Elixir F-WLXR

=== October ===
- 11 October - Scaled Composites 401
- 19 October - Airbus A330-900neo

=== November ===
- 18 November - Beriev A-100

=== December ===
- 17 December - Rans S-21 Outbound N215RD
- 18 December - Bell V-280 Valor
- 24 December – AVIC AG600.

== Entered service ==
=== May ===
- 22 May : Boeing 737 MAX-8 with Malindo Air
- 31 May: A321neo with Virgin America, configured with 184 seats and LEAP engines.

== Retirements ==
=== December ===
- 13 December : Shin Meiwa US-1A.

== Deadliest crash ==
With 12.2 fatalities per billion passengers, 2017 was the safest year in aviation history. Only five fatal commercial aviation accidents occurred, associated with 50 fatalities. The deadliest crash of the year was a military accident, namely the 2017 Myanmar Air Force Shaanxi Y-8 crash which crashed into the Andaman Sea near Myanmar on 7 June 2017 killing all 122 people on board.
