= Elixir (disambiguation) =

An elixir is a type of pharmaceutical preparation.

Elixir may also refer to:

== Arts and media ==
=== Music ===
- Elixir (British band), a British heavy metal band
- Elixir (Australian band), an Australian jazz band
  - Elixir (Elixir album), 2003
- Elixir Strings, an American maker of strings for stringed instruments
- Elixir (Iasos album), 1983
- Elixir (Fourplay album), 1994
- Elixir (Hal Russell album), 2001
- "Elixir", a song by Vast Aire

=== Other media ===
- Elixir (character), a fictional mutant in the Marvel Universe
- Elixir (Duff and Allen novel), a novel by Hilary Duff and Elise Allen
- Elixir (Walters novel), a novel by Eric Walters
- Elixir (video game), a 1987 video game
- Elixir (film), a 2016 Bengali short film

== Other uses ==
- ELIXIR (European life-sciences infrastructure for biological information), a collaborative research network
- Elixir (perfume), a perfume by Shakira
- Elixir (programming language)
- Elixir Studios, a British video game developer
- Elixir Aircraft Elixir, a light aircraft design

== See also ==
- Elixer, Missouri, a community in the United States
- Elixir of life, a legendary drink that grants eternal life or youth
- Elisir (disambiguation)
