= CSeries dumping petition by Boeing =

2017 petition by Boeing

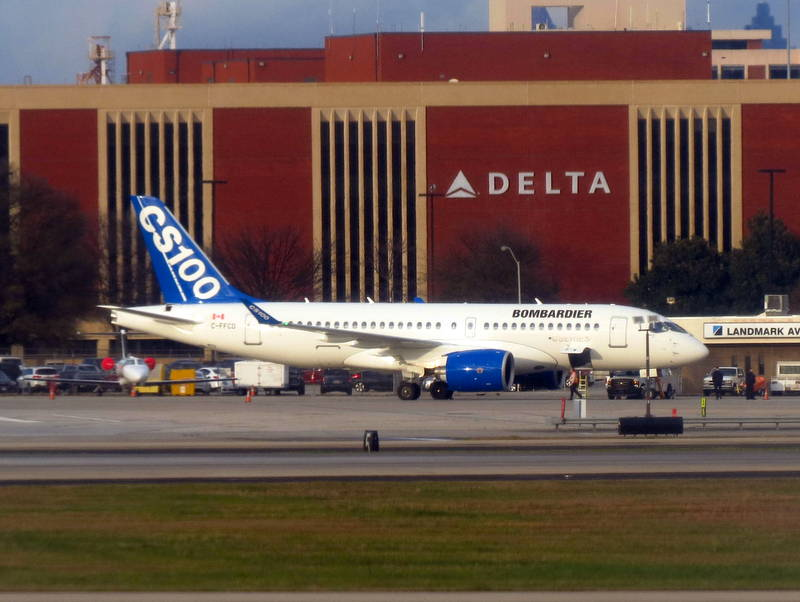
The CSeries CS100 demonstrated for Delta Air Lines in Atlanta

On 28 April 2016, Bombardier Aerospace recorded a firm order from Delta Air Lines for 75 CSeries CS100s plus 50 options. On 27 April 2017, The Boeing Company filed a petition for dumping them at $19.6m each, below their $33.2m production cost. On the same day, both Bombardier and the government of Canada rejected Boeing's claim, vowing to mount a "vigorous defence".

On 9 June 2017, the US International Trade Commission (USITC) found that the US industry could be threatened and should be protected. On 26 September, after lobbying by Boeing, the US Department of Commerce (DoC) alleged subsidies of 220% and intended to collect deposits accordingly, plus a preliminary 80% anti-dumping duty, resulting in a duty of 300%. The DoC announced its final ruling, a total duty of 292%, on 20 December, hailing it as an affirmation of the "America First" policy. In October, with financial issues already mounting, Bombardier was indirectly forced by the US government tariffs to relinquish 50.01% of its stake in the CSeries program to Airbus for a symbolic CAD$1, and would produce CSeries aircraft in the United States.

On 10 January 2018, Canada formally filed a complaint at the World Trade Organization (WTO) against the United States over the affair. On 26 January, the four USITC commissioners unanimously reversed their earlier claims, finding that US industry is no longer threatened and no duty orders will be issued, overturning the imposed duties. The Commission public report was made available by February 2018. On March 22, Boeing declined to appeal the ruling.

== Initial sale ==
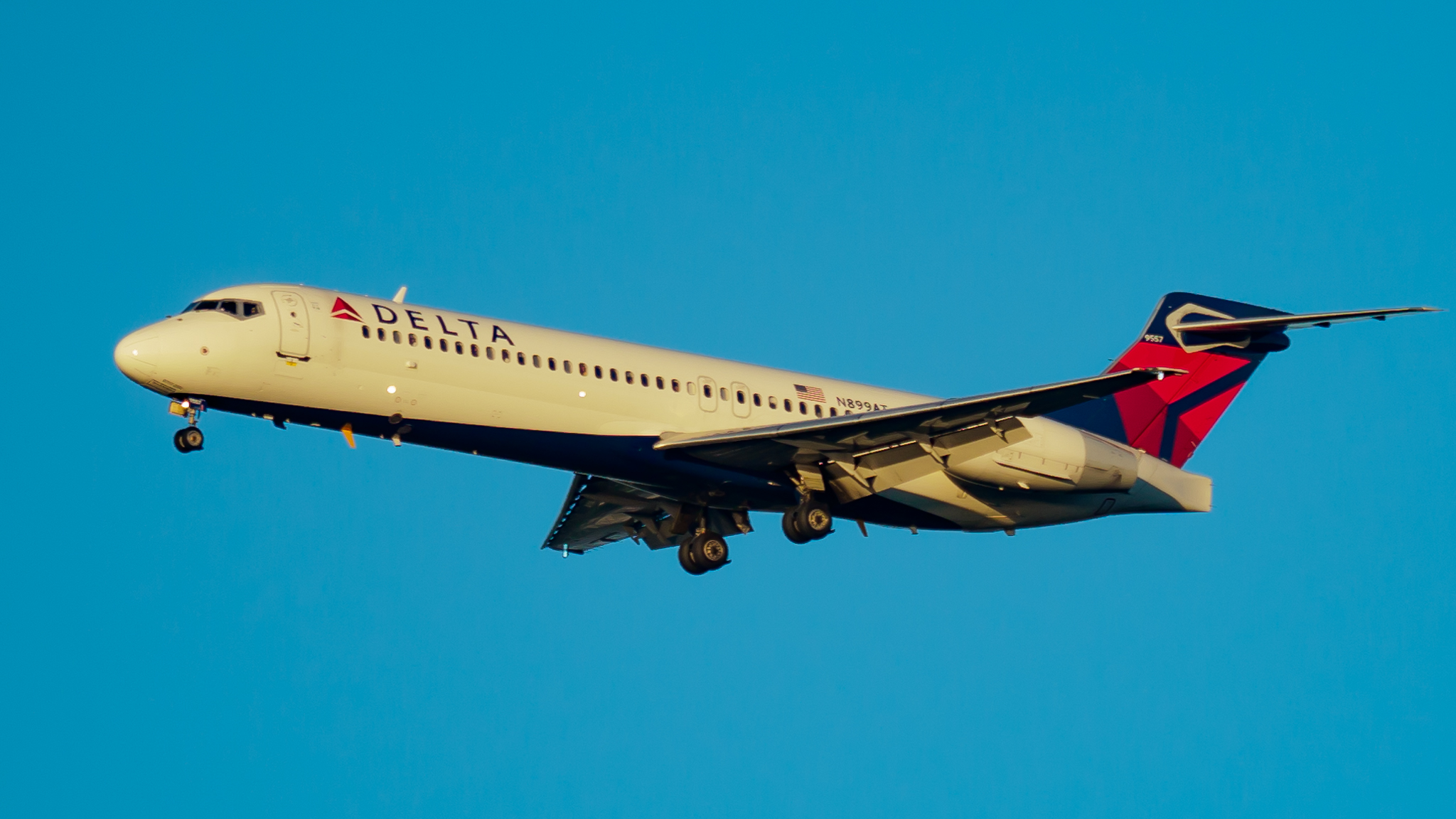
A Boeing 717 from Delta Air Lines

On 28 April 2016, Bombardier Aerospace and Delta Air Lines announced a sale for 75 CSeries CS100 firm orders and 50 options, the first aircraft should enter service in spring 2018. Delta Air Lines, it was thought, would likely start using more fuel-efficient CS100s in 2018 on flights out of Los Angeles, New York and Dallas. Airways News believe that a substantial 65 to 70% discount off the $71.8 million list price was provided making the final sale at $24.6–28.7 million price per aircraft; this large order from a major carrier could help Bombardier to break the Boeing/Airbus duopoly on narrowbody aircraft.

== Dumping petition ==
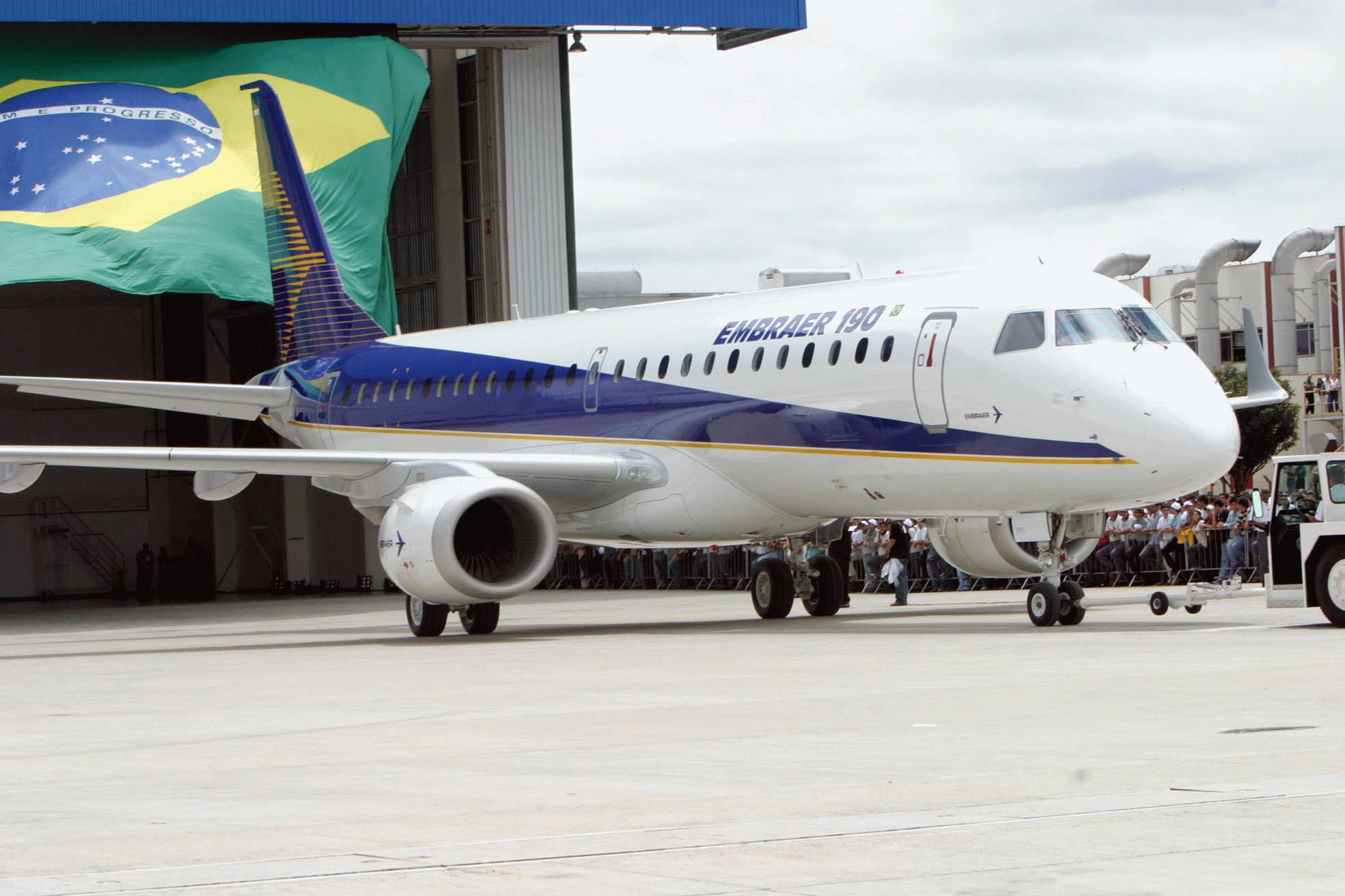
The Embraer 190

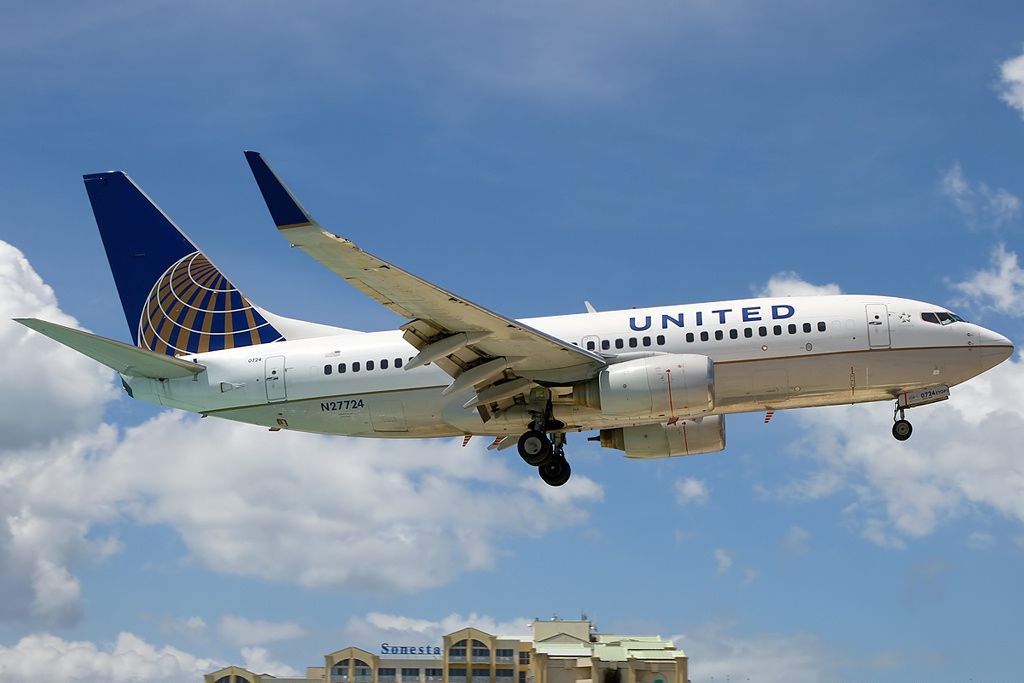
A United Airlines Boeing 737-700

On 27 April 2017, Boeing filed a petition charging Bombardier with dumping for selling 75+50 CS100s to Delta Air Lines for $19.6m each, below their $33.2m production cost. Aviation Week & Space Technology noted "The reaction to Boeing's petition against Bombardier across much of the aerospace industry has been sharply negative". FlightGlobal qualified the move as "perhaps the most back-handed compliment one manufacturer can pay another". Delta Air Lines dismissed Boeing's allegations, claiming Boeing only offered a combination of used Embraer E-190 and Boeing 717s which were unavailable for the Delta timeline as Boeing does not currently produce a model in the 100-125 seat range, not the Boeing 737-700 or 737 MAX 7. Boeing itself received multibillion-dollar tax breaks from Washington state. The Canadian Press compared the situation to David and Goliath.

At the 18 May United States International Trade Commission hearing, Boeing's vice-chairman Ray Conner stated "It will only take one or two lost sales involving US customers before commercial viability of the Max 7, and therefore the US industry's very future, becomes very doubtful" and "Bombardier has said it wants 50% of this market, which it will probably win at the prices it is offering. If Bombardier does that, we're looking at losing $330 million dollars in revenue every year". Bombardier Commercial Aircraft president Fred Cromer said "the Boeing numbers are not accurate, whether we're talking about the sales price or the production cost,[...] early airplanes are expensive [to produce] and every manufacturer looks at the entire program" and the pricing to Delta was in the context of relaunching the program at the 2015 Paris Air Show and had to account for the "perceived risk" of ordering a new aircraft.

Boeing offered United Airlines very low prices for the Boeing 737-700 to undercut Bombardier, affecting the pricing of the MAX 7 and cascading on the rest of the Boeing 737 MAX family. That was a threat to the company's future and ultimately the US aerospace industry, according to Boeing. While the CS100 seats 110 in two-class, Bombardier responded to the 100-seat requirement by pricing it as a light two-class 100-seater and charging for 10 more seats as needed. Bombardier was surprised when United ordered the larger 737-700 as the competition was believed to be the Embraer E190, possibly tied to other Boeing 777-300ER or Boeing 787 deals.

== Initial findings ==
On 9 June, the US Trade Commission voted that there is a reasonable indication that the US industry is threatened and will publish its report after 10 July 2017. The US Department of Commerce will continue to conduct its investigations, with its preliminary countervailing duty determination due on 21 July 2017, and its antidumping duty determination due on 4 October 2017. Its detailed decision is heavily redacted, not allowing an observer to understand the ITC reasoning.

As the US Department of Commerce should announce eventual measures against Bombardier on 25 September 2017, Spirit Airlines and Sun Country Airlines presented their support of the CSeries, benefiting US travelers while Boeing does not offer any 100-140 seat aircraft.

== Preliminary duties ==
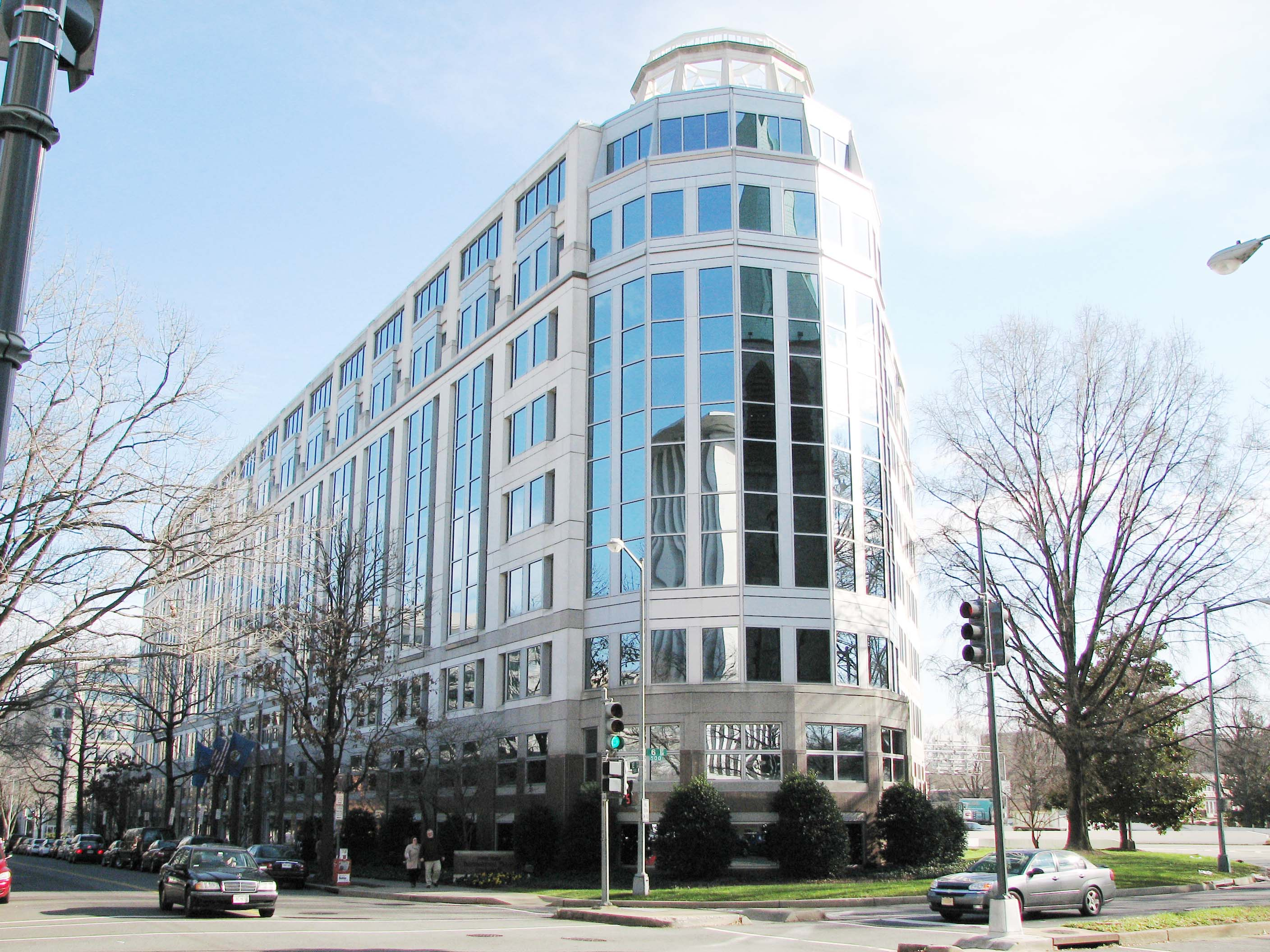
The USITC in Washington, D.C.

On 26 September, the Department of Commerce announced it found that Bombardier received subsidies of 220%, and will collect deposits based on these preliminary rates. Bombardier said it will be disputing the "absurd" ruling which is "divorced from the reality about the financing of multibillion-dollar aircraft programmes".

On 6 October 2017 the US Department of Commerce announced it would add an 80% preliminary anti-dumping duty on top, resulting in a total duty of 300%. On 1 February 2018, the US International Trade Commission will issue its final subsidy and dumping determinations which will support tariffs ultimately imposed by the US government's Commerce department on 8 February. Delta Air Lines is confident Bombardier will be eventually exonerated.

University of Waterloo's Danny Lam suggest Boeing's trade complaint real reason is the potential expansion of China's aviation industry through Bombardier. Delta Air Lines CEO Ed Bastian said "we do not expect to pay any tariffs and we do expect to take the planes", maybe with a delay, but he had "various other plans and alternatives".

== Reactions ==
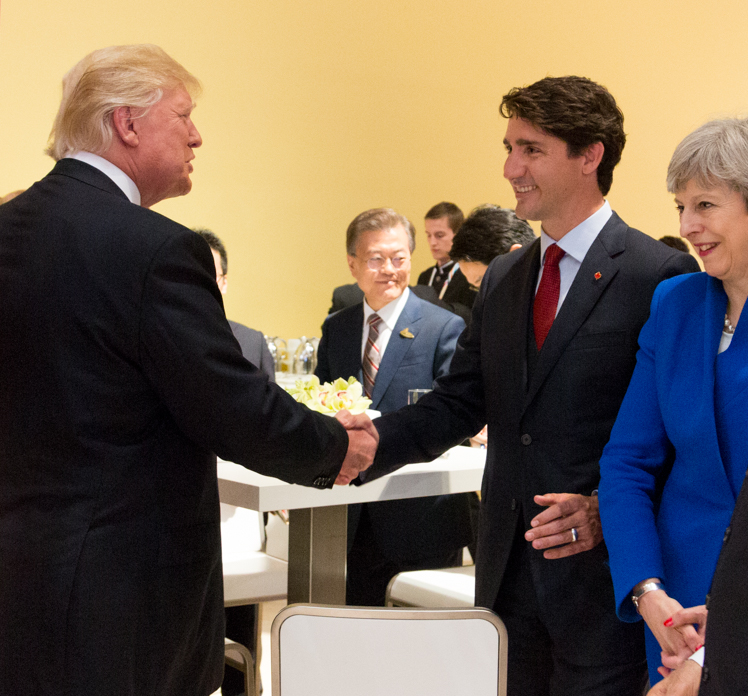
Donald Trump, Justin Trudeau and Theresa May

=== Canada ===
Boeing's actions may affect the planned sale of Boeing F/A-18E/F Super Hornet jet fighters to the Royal Canadian Air Force, warned Prime Minister Justin Trudeau in a statement in mid September. "We won't do business with a company that's busy ... trying to put our aerospace workers out of business". Canadian Defence Minister Harjit Sajjan confirmed on 28 September 2017 that Boeing's products are unlikely to be selected because it is not a "trusted partner". "Our government is not going to allow our aerospace sector to be attacked in this manner ... We can't do business with a company that treats us in this way." Canada will review Boeing's bid when it is presented.

On 12 October, Boeing replied that its illegal-subsidies complaint against Bombardier is about selling aircraft below the cost of production and not an attempt to hurt a competitor, the company merely wants "fairness" in "following trade rules" as Boeing claims to be already doing. In meetings with Donald Trump, Trudeau warned: "The attempt by Boeing to put tens of thousands of aerospace workers out of work across Canada is not something we look on positively and I certainly mentioned that this was a block to us ... making any military procurements from Boeing".

Canada will run a competition for 88 new fighters to replace its current 77 CF-18s at a cost of C$15 to C$19 billion. The competitors are expected to include Airbus Defence and Space, Boeing, Dassault Aviation and Lockheed Martin. The government scrapped its plans to buy 18 new Super Hornets as an interim measure on 12 December 2017 and will instead buy 18 second-hand Australian F/A-18s for an estimated C$500 million (US$388 million). The Canadian government made clear that Boeing will not be considered a trusted partner unless it drops its CSeries trade challenge.

=== United Kingdom ===
Bombardier, via its subsidiary Short Brothers, is a major employer in Belfast, Northern Ireland. The UK's Prime Minister Theresa May announced that her government would work with the company to protect the 4,000 "vital" jobs. British Defence Secretary Michael Fallon said "We have contracts in place with Boeing for new maritime patrol aircraft and for Apache attack helicopters and they will also be bidding for other defence work and this kind of behaviour clearly could jeopardise our future relationship." Boeing UK is also a major employer in the UK.

May hinted that the UK might cease ordering aircraft from Boeing unless the punitive tariff against Bombardier is dropped. The UK government's orders for helicopters and patrol aircraft are already firm and Boeing will refuse to back down to prevent "subsidized competition" and "illegal dumping" by Bombardier which would hurt Boeing for many years. The Republic of Ireland's Taoiseach Leo Varadkar warned that the Commerce Department's tariff may result in a UK-US trade war. On October 11, Barry Gardiner of the UK Labour Party accused Boeing of hypocrisy, insisting that all aircraft manufacturers require government subsidies; he labeled Boeing "the king of corporate welfare" and a "subsidy junkie" and suggested it was trying to "crush a competitor". Bombardier manufacturing in Northern Ireland employs indirectly 11,000 people.

=== European Union ===
Boeing was prepared for the possibility of losing military sales from the Canadian and UK reactions, but was surprised that Airbus took a majority stake in the program, which could cause EU retaliation, leading to the US possibly backing down. In its original April complaint, Boeing notes that "Airbus has opened a final assembly facility in Mobile, AL [...] to produce Aircraft in the United States [and is] treated as a domestic Aircraft producer".

== Airbus-Bombardier partnership ==
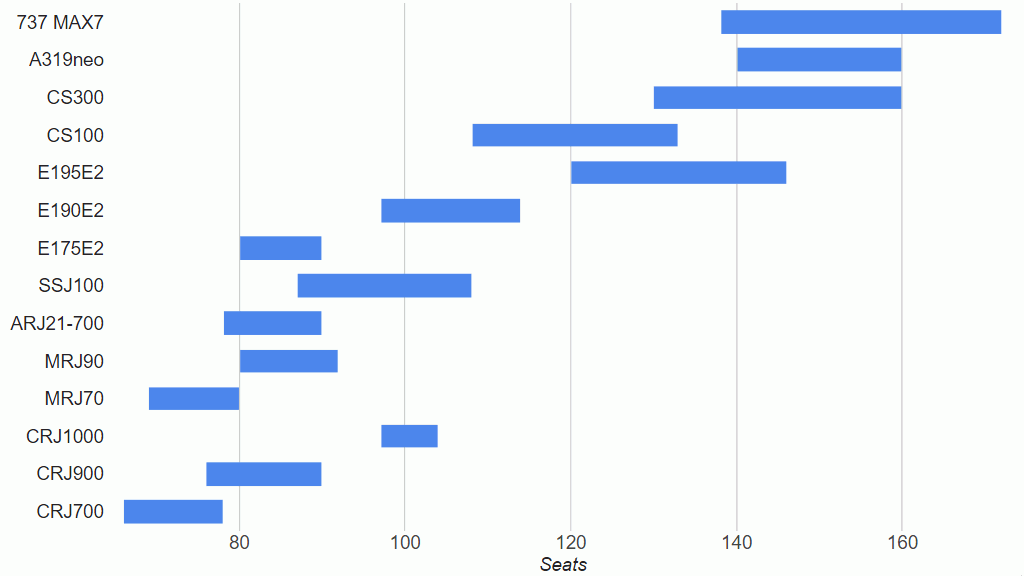
seating comparisons with the CSeries

On 16 October 2017, Airbus and Bombardier announced a partnership on the CSeries program, with Airbus acquiring a 50.01% majority stake, Bombardier keeping 31% and Investissement Québec 19%, headquarters and assembly remain in Québec while US customers would benefit from a second Final Assembly Line in Mobile, Alabama. Bombardier CEO Alain Bellemare said "When you produce an aircraft in the US, it is not subject to an import duty under US rules [...] We are not circumventing anything". Boeing thinks this would not exempt the aircraft from potential tariffs.

In some 13 November filings, Delta insists its order is not an actual sale and no aircraft would be imported due to the aircraft being built in the US, while Bombardier argues that its deal with Airbus should be left outside the investigation, as is Boeing, which also claims the Mobile site's only goal is to circumvent duties, and if tariffs are dropped it will never materialize. In a 20 November filing, Delta said "In Boeing's view, any action would be a potential form of 'evasion'", like modifying a purchase agreement, evaluating 109-seat aircraft not produced in US or expanding the US aerospace industry and competition for customers.

Depending on the outcome of the US ITC ruling in early 2018, the CSeries aircraft earmarked for Delta in 2018 could be delivered to other customers. Bombardier will carry out the preparatory work to start the second final assembly line once the partnership is approved. This construction would take two years and result in early 2020 deliveries. The US content already exceeds 50% without the final assembly and is close to 60% with it included.

Aviation journalist Anthony L. Velocci Jr. argues that the US will benefit from the partnership: the Mobile plant would need $300 million and thousands of jobs for its construction, then would need 2,000 permanent jobs and over 22,500 jobs at US suppliers produce 52% of the CSeries content, which add to Boeing production which is oversold while its real competition is the Embraer E-Jet E2. Travellers and airlines will benefit from its roomier cabin, lower noise and emissions, better fuel economy and longer range to make domestic tertiary markets viable. Boeing risks alienating many of its customers for little perceived gain, according to Velocci.

The Boeing-supported Lexington Institute stated that the Canadian government support to Bombardier when it was facing bankruptcy in 2015 was intended to save Canadian jobs by sacrificing American jobs and undermining Boeing 737 sales, the most important Boeing product. After it had to cut its price by 70% to beat the CSeries for United Airlines in 2016, Boeing decided to act when the CSeries was offered to Delta at $10 million below its production cost, with the intent of protecting its workers, retirees and shareholders. If Airbus, Bombardier and maybe others can rely on government subsidies, its managers think Boeing could lose its ability to innovate and price its products competitively, thus jeopardizing its long-term survival.

Unexpectedly, Boeing action could increase manufacturers concentration and reinforce itself and Airbus market power.

== Hearings ==
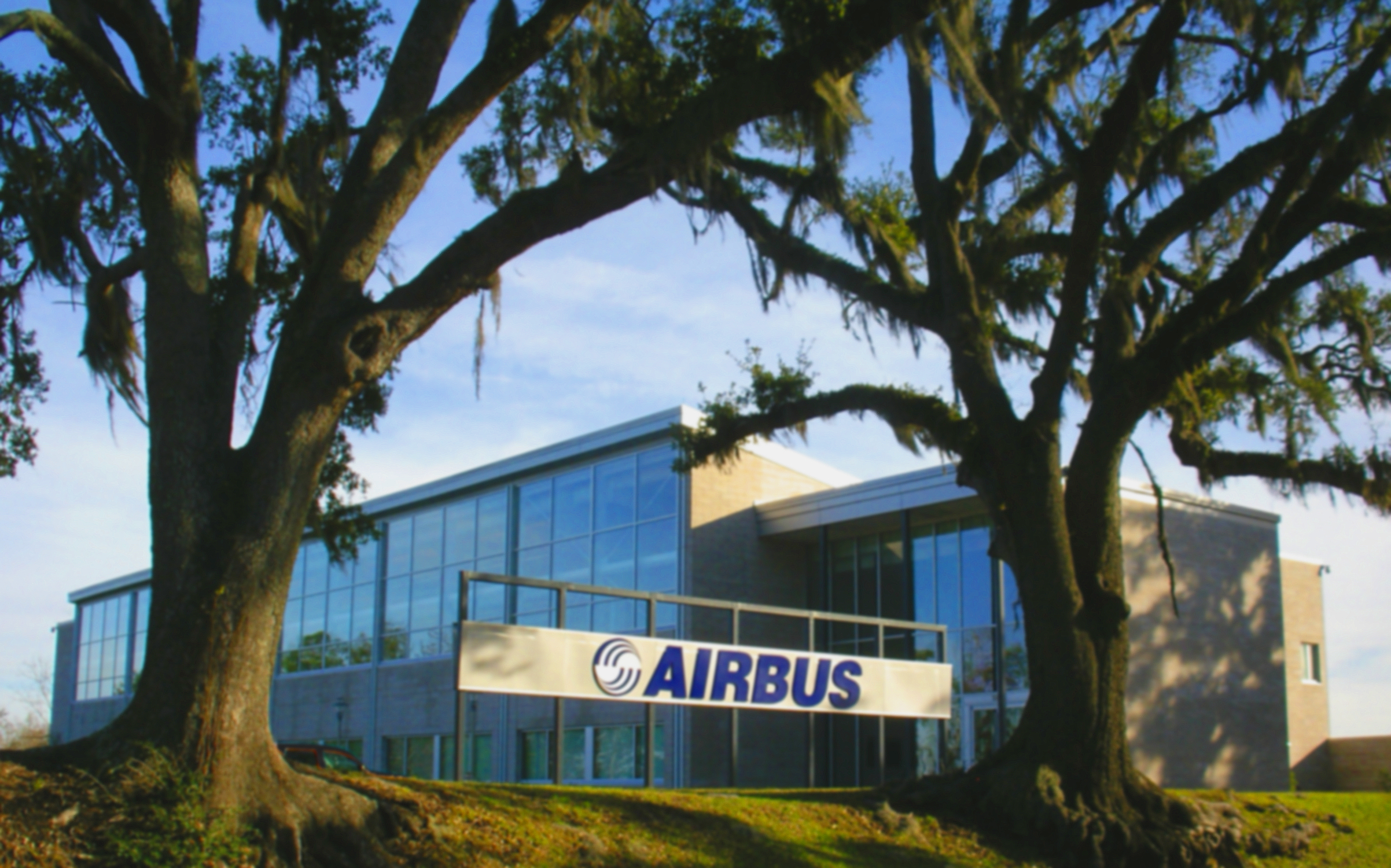
Airbus Mobile facility in Alabama

On 13 December 2017, Michael Arthur, president of Boeing Europe and managing director of Boeing UK and Ireland, formally testified in the UK House of Commons, stating the process is simply legal and not political: Bombardier sold aircraft below the cost of production, a textbook case of dumping, to seek a flagship sale to boost sales. Boeing has stated that the tariffs should stay in place, even if the CSeries is built in Mobile, Alabama, with a majority US content, and stressed that with a small typical seating difference, the CS300 competes with the 737-700 and 737 MAX 7 in the 100-150-seat category, a $4 billion market including $1 billion in the US.

On 14 December 2017, Delta Air Lines ordered 100 Airbus A321neos and 100 further options over choosing a Boeing design. The next day, Boeing stated that it has not tried to stop the proceedings before the US Commerce Department issues its findings and the ITC hosts a final hearing on 18 December 2017, ahead of its vote on 26 January 2018.

At the 18 December 2017 US ITC hearing, Delta confirmed it has asked Bombardier to guarantee that all the aircraft it ordered will be assembled in Mobile. While the 135-seat 737-7 has not won a major new order since 2013, Boeing confirmed its interest in that market segment and said that it could accommodate an order for near-term deliveries by increasing overall rates and shuffling production slots.

Canada's ambassador to the US, David MacNaughton, warned that a positive finding by the ITC "based on just the type of 'speculation and conjecture' that is prohibited under both US and international law" could violate World Trade Organization agreements.

For industry observer Addison Schonland, the ITC commissioners seemed insufficiently qualified and missed opportunities to better understand fleet planning by asking why the MAX7 is not a commercial success, even revamped, or why would United initially ordered the less efficient 737-700 and then switched to the larger 737-900 within two months.

== Decisions ==
=== Department of Commerce ===
On 20 December 2017, the US Department of Commerce (DoC) confirmed the dumping and subsidization allegations, determined they were sold at 80% less than fair value and unfair subsidies of 212% were provided: the 292% tariff will be imposed, depending on the US ITC final injury determinations. For airline analyst Leeham, the DoC ignored that the 737-700 production was over and the 737-7 MAX is an unattractive design that has garnered very little interest from airlines, while Boeing was unwilling to invest in a new single-aisle airplane.

On 21 December, Boeing and Embraer confirmed to be discussing a potential combination with a transaction subject to Brazilian government regulators, the companies' boards and shareholders approvals. The Airbus-Bombardier tie-up is "questionable" for Boeing but it could mimic it at a larger scale and considering the financial and regulatory cost of an Embraer deal dismiss the Max 7 as a clear outright competitor: Boeing didn't have the right-sized airliner to compete for Delta and thus wasn't harmed by unfair competition.

World Trade Organization members

Delta, Bombardier and Boeing filed their last post-hearing briefs and exhibits on December 27. As a 4 January 2018 ITC filing notes Bombardier did not provide the projected or estimated value of aircraft parts to be imported into the United States, the ITC could support Commerce's conclusions although they are two distinct agencies. On 9 January, the ITC asked Bombardier to provide more information on renegotiations with Delta and the CSeries manufacture within a week. On 10 January, the Canadian government filed a complaint at the World Trade Organization against the US.

To support the four commissions' 25 January vote, the ITC staff published a 118-page report reviewing both arguments, summarizing its investigation from the legal submissions, public briefings and the airliner industry questionnaires, including manufacturers, airlines and lessors. The report reviews aircraft distribution, production and characteristics leading to purchases and notes the complexity of aircraft demand, availability, prices, the amount of imports and their effect on Boeing's sales. It notes a "moderate-to-high degree of substitutability" between the CS100/CS300s and the 737-700/Max 7, with the questionnaire responses reporting better availability, price, lifetime costs, fuel efficiency and technology for the CSeries, while Boeing has an edge for fleet commonality, performance and range.

As the ITC requested more details about the Alabama final assembly site, Bombardier responded on 17 January, saying that it was obtaining regulatory approvals, visiting the site and planning the details, while abiding by antitrust law requirements. Bombardier has identified the tooling and equipment required, replicating its Mirabel plant and has prepared a human resources plan to recruit 400-500 employees. In answering the ITC request for more information on its possible merger with Embraer, Boeing claims its regional jets do not, and will not, compete with the 737, unlike the CSeries, and that it has collaborated with the Brazilian company on previous projects. The publicly available documents were heavily redacted and sparsely detailed.

Republican Alabama congressman Bradley Byrne and Kansas senator Jerry Moran have written the ITC to support Bombardier as the tariff would "take work away from US suppliers and quash thousands of US jobs, ultimately hurting the greater US aerospace industry". On 23 January 2018, after Embraer increased the range of its E-jet E2-190 to nearly 2,900 nmi (5,400 km) due to better than expected fuel burn during tests, Bombardier tried to draw it into the dispute, as it could fall within the seating and range parameters in question. The request was rejected the next day.

=== International Trade Commission ===
On 26 January 2018, the ITC four commissioners unanimously determined the U.S. industry is not threatened and no duty orders will be issued, the Commission public report will be available by March 2, 2018. Bombardier maintains its intent to open a final assembly site in Mobile, Alabama.

Airinsight wrote that Bombardier was dumping aircraft below their cost is technically correct, like every other manufacturer, as early deliveries are sold to major launch customers at less their actual cost, not benefiting from learning curve improvements; and Bombardier did receive government subsidies for the program, like Airbus, Boeing, and Embraer have all received government subsidies ... but the ITC was also correct in finding "no harm – no foul"."

In its reasoning published three weeks after, the ITC said "Boeing lost no sales or revenues" and "The higher standard seating capacity of the 737-700 and 737 MAX 7 limits competition between those models and the CS100 for some purchasers". Boeing can appeal the decision at the Court of International Trade in New York, or reach for a settlement under the backtracking NAFTA: compared with what has already been spent, the cost to appeal would be marginal. The decision came down to seat count: "Delta did not consider any new 100- to 150-seat [aircraft] from Boeing because the 126-seat 737-700 and the 138-seat 737 Max 7 were unsuitable for the mission profile in question" and "Because Boeing did not lose this sale to Delta, Delta's imports of CS100s will not displace domestically produced 100- to 150-seat [aircraft] from the US market". Low launch pricing is common, as "Boeing offered substantial discounts on many orders for out-of-scope 787 [aircraft] during the years following the new model's launch in 2004, but then secured substantially higher prices on subsequent orders".

The published report could allow deliveries to Delta from Mirabel, Quebec in 2018, not having to wait for the proposed Alabama assembly site. Delta confirmed it will take deliveries from Canada this year to meet "contractual commitments", helping Bombardier meet its target of 40 deliveries up from 17 in 2017, but intends "to take as many deliveries as possible from [Alabama] as soon as that facility is up and running".

On March 22, Boeing declined to appeal the ruling.

=== Earlier similar cases ===
In a similar case in 1982 for 19-seat turboprops, Fairchild claimed its Metro (600 made between 1972 and 2001) was threatened by the Embraer Bandeirante (501 made between 1973 and 1990), Embraer argued that it was absurd to impose tariffs because 54% of its components were US-made and Fairchild suffered no damage from an airplane of different specifications: the Metro is a pressurised aircraft while the Bandeirante is not; the ITC rejected the complaint. In 2010, the ITC was called to verify if Embraer received government support since 2006 while 13,000 Kansas workers lost their jobs in business jet manufacturing where Cessna, Hawker Beechcraft or Lear Jet have their factories; Florida testified in 2011 that the US was Embraer's largest supplier base and the ITC concluded that the Great Recession of 2008 depressed bizjet sales among lack of financing and credit and cost US jobs, not subsidies to Embraer.

The ITC staff report also reviews the May 1982 dismissed petition from the Commuter Aircraft Corporation claiming harm from ATR Aircraft subsidies and the August 1982 rejected petition from Fairchild Swearingen against Brazilian aircraft.

== Aftermath ==
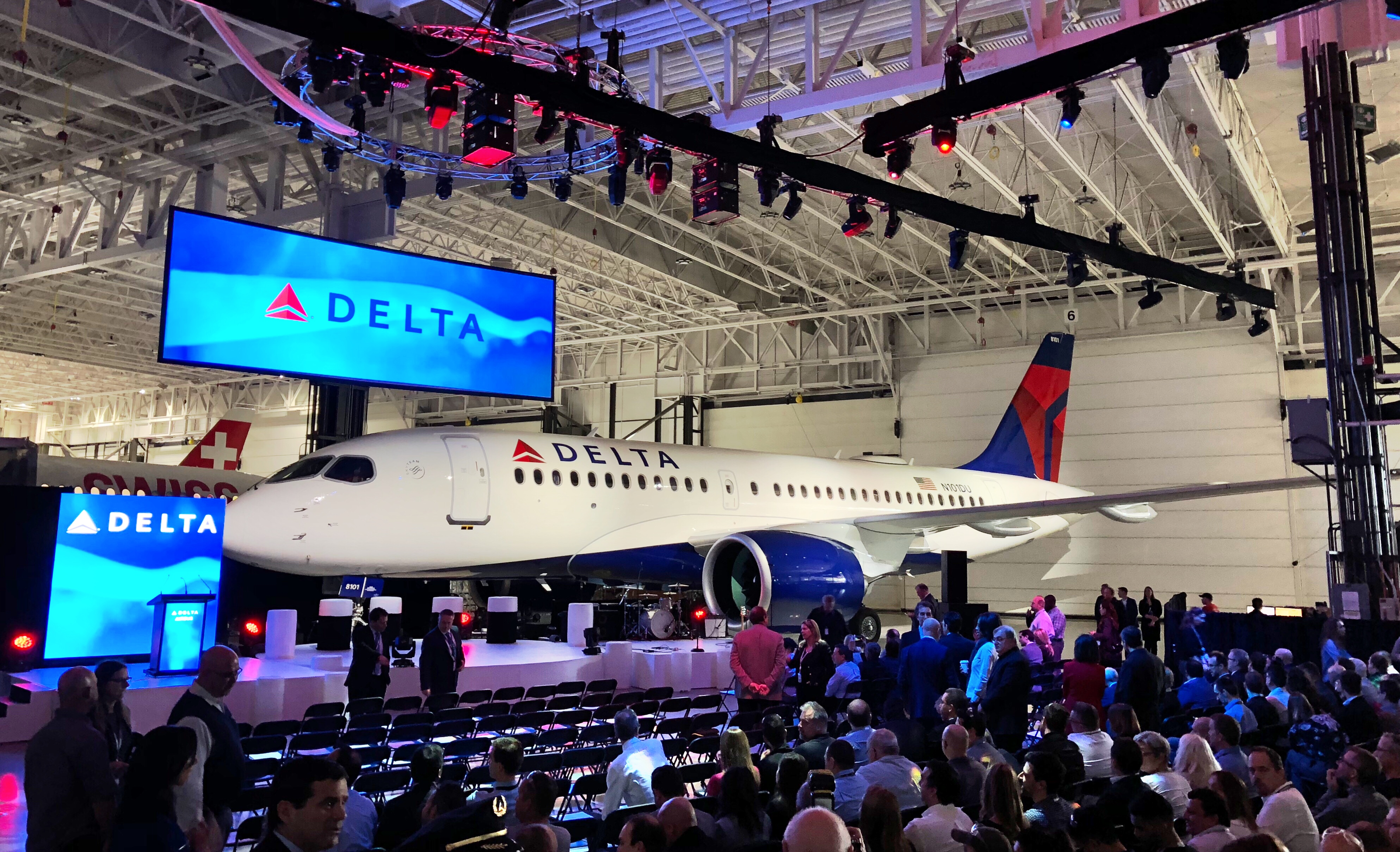
First delivery to Delta in October 2018

Delta Air Lines was to receive its first aircraft from Mirabel in the third quarter of 2018, contradicting Bombardier's 2017 testimony at the ITC that aircraft assembled in Quebec were not going to go to US customers. From 31 January 2019, they were to be debuted from New York LaGuardia to Dallas/Fort Worth (1,207 nmi, 2,235 km) and Boston Logan, while Delta told the commission that the airline would pay an additional fee if it was flown on routes averaging more than 1,000 nautical miles (1,900 km).

Airbus took over the CSeries program on 1 July 2018 and renamed it the A220-100/300. The first -100 was delivered to Delta on 26 October 2018. In January 2019, Delta ordered 15 other A220s for a total of 90 until 2023, including a conversion of 50 to the larger 130-seat -300 from 2020. In 2020, amid mounting debts, Bombardier sold its remaining A220 stake to Airbus and exited the commercial plane business. With this deal, Airbus's stake in the A220 programme increased from 50.01% to 75%, while the Quebec government's holding rose to 25%, although it will not be injecting any new money into the program.
