= Elix =

Elix may refer to:

- Əlix, a village in the municipality of Quturğan, Qusar Rayon, Azerbaijan
- Bob Elix, Australian rules football official in the Northern Territory
- John Alan Elix (born 1941), Australian lichenologist

== See also ==
- Helix (disambiguation)
- Elixir (disambiguation)
