= Jeweled Space =

Studio album by Iasos
- Released: 1981; 1986; 12 April 1987
- Genres: New-age; Minimal; Ambient; Space music
- Length: 60:00
- Label: Inter-Dimensional Music
- Producer: Iasos

Iasos chronology
Crystal Love (1979)	Jeweled Space (1981)	Throne Realms And Lagoon Waves (1982)

Jeweled Space is a studio album by new-age musician Iasos.

It was released on cassette by his Inter-Dimensional Music label in 1981 and then re-released in 1986, 12 April 1987 and 2008 (1986 and 1987 versions are better-known). Most of the versions include two equally 30-minutes long tracks, "The Valley Of Enchimed Peace" and "The Royal Court Of The Goddess Vesta" (on some versions lengths vary). They are ambient, drone-like electronic new-age pieces. It was described by author as "subtle background music to be played at low volume" and consist of cool, soothing first track and warm, nurturing second one. The second track is reworked second half of "Helios & Vesta" from Iasos's earlier 1983 album Elixir.

== Track listing ==
No.	Title	Length
1.	"The Valley Of Enchimed Peace"	30:00
2.	"The Royal Court Of The Goddess Vesta"	30:00
