= Elisir =

Elisir may refer to:

- Elisir (Alice album), 1987
- Elisir (Roberto Vecchioni album), 1976

== See also ==
- Elixir (disambiguation)
