= Iasos (musician) =

Greek-born American new age musician (1947–2024)

- Born: Joseph Bernardot; January 9, 1947; Alexandroupolis, Greece
- Died: January 6, 2024 (aged 76)
- Occupations: Composer, musician

Joseph Bernardot (January 9, 1947 – January 6, 2024), better known by his stage name Iasos, was a Greek-born American musician and composer who was considered a pioneer of new-age music. His company Inter-Dimensional Music is based in Sausalito, California. Iasos performed and lectured internationally, and his music is distributed worldwide. His music has been used by NASA and the Laserium light show.

== Life and career ==
Born in Alexandroupolis, Greece, at age four, Iasos and his family moved to the United States, first settling in St. Regis Falls, New York and then Malone, New York. He began piano lessons when he was eight and the flute at age ten; he played the latter in his school band. He graduated from Franklin Academy as salutatorian in 1964. In June 1968, he graduated from Cornell University with a degree in cultural anthropology. He performed in rock and smooth jazz bands during this time, including his group the Nova Shadow Quartet, which he said was "played in a sloppy unprofessional manner. Nothing I would want to share publicly." After he decided against a scholarship he relocated to California to pursue music further, first to Berkeley before settling in Marin County.

Iasos thought of his stage name as he was walking down a street. He began working on music that he would internally "hear", describing it as "paradise music". He considered classical composers Ottorino Respighi, Maurice Ravel, and Claude Debussy, pianist Martin Denny, and guitarist Jimi Hendrix as particular musical influences during this time. Following his move to California, Iasos collaborated with other musicians for a short period but to no success, so he chose to become a solo artist. It was then when "things got very far out very fast". In the early 1970s, Iasos attended sessions with a spiritual teacher in Sausalito, who paired him with a spiritual being named Vista (or Cyclopea, named after the Elohim of the Fifth Ray). Vista has been a source of inspiration and direction in Iasos's music ever since. He recalled: "As soon as I felt his presence it was like remembering him from long ago, and there's this flood of love coming out from me to him."

In 1975, Iasos released his first album, Inter-Dimensional Music. It was in the same year that his friend and fellow musician Steven Halpern also released his debut, Spectrum Suite. The latter features Iasos playing the electric flute. Both albums are now considered pioneers in the New-age music genre.

Iasos died of cardiovascular disease on January 6, 2024, at the age of 76.

== Reception ==
In 1989, research conducted by Professor Joel Funk at Plymouth State University reported that of people who have had near-death experiences referred to the track "The Angels of Comfort" from Iasos's album Angelic Music (1978) as being closest to the music they heard during these experiences by a wide margin.

Buddhist philosopher Alan Watts has said "Iasos is doing the classical music of the New Age." Guitarist Lee Underwood has said "Angelic Music...perhaps exemplif(ies) the best this genre has to offer."

== Discography ==
Studio albums

- Inter-Dimensional Music Through Iasos (1975; also known as Wave #1: Inter-Dimensional Music)
- Vibrational Environments #1: Angelic Music (1978)
- Crystal Love (1979)
- Vibrational Environments #2: Earth Calm/Space Calm (1979)
- Vibrational Environments #3: Paradise Bird of Melodies (1980)
- Birds for Morning & Evening (1980)
- Jeweled Space (1981)
- Vibrational Environments #4: Throne Realms & Lagoon Waves (1982)
- Wave #2: Elixir (1983)
- Essence of Spring (1983)
- Bora Bora 2000 (1991)
- Timeless Sound: Music for Deep Meditation (1991)
- Liquid Crystal Love (1992)
- Realms of Light (2001)
- Javanese Dream Bells (2007)
- Celestial Soul Portrait (2013; compilation)
- Night Time Jungle Sounds on Planet Allura (2014)
- Essence of Lemuria (2015)
- Heavenly Dreamscapes (2016; compilation)
- The Next Dimension (2020)

Digital releases

- "Pan – Musing" (2014)
- "Imaginational Resonance" (2022)
- "The Garden of Salathooslia" (2023)

Videos

- Crystal Vista (1982)
- Realms of Light (2010)

Appearances

- Steven Halpern – Spectrum Suite (1975)
- Kelly Howell – Sound Sleep (1992)
- Jonn Serrie, Iasos, and Kevin Kendle – Music for Accelerated-Consciousness Love-Making (2012)
