= Mahul Brahma =

Indian actor

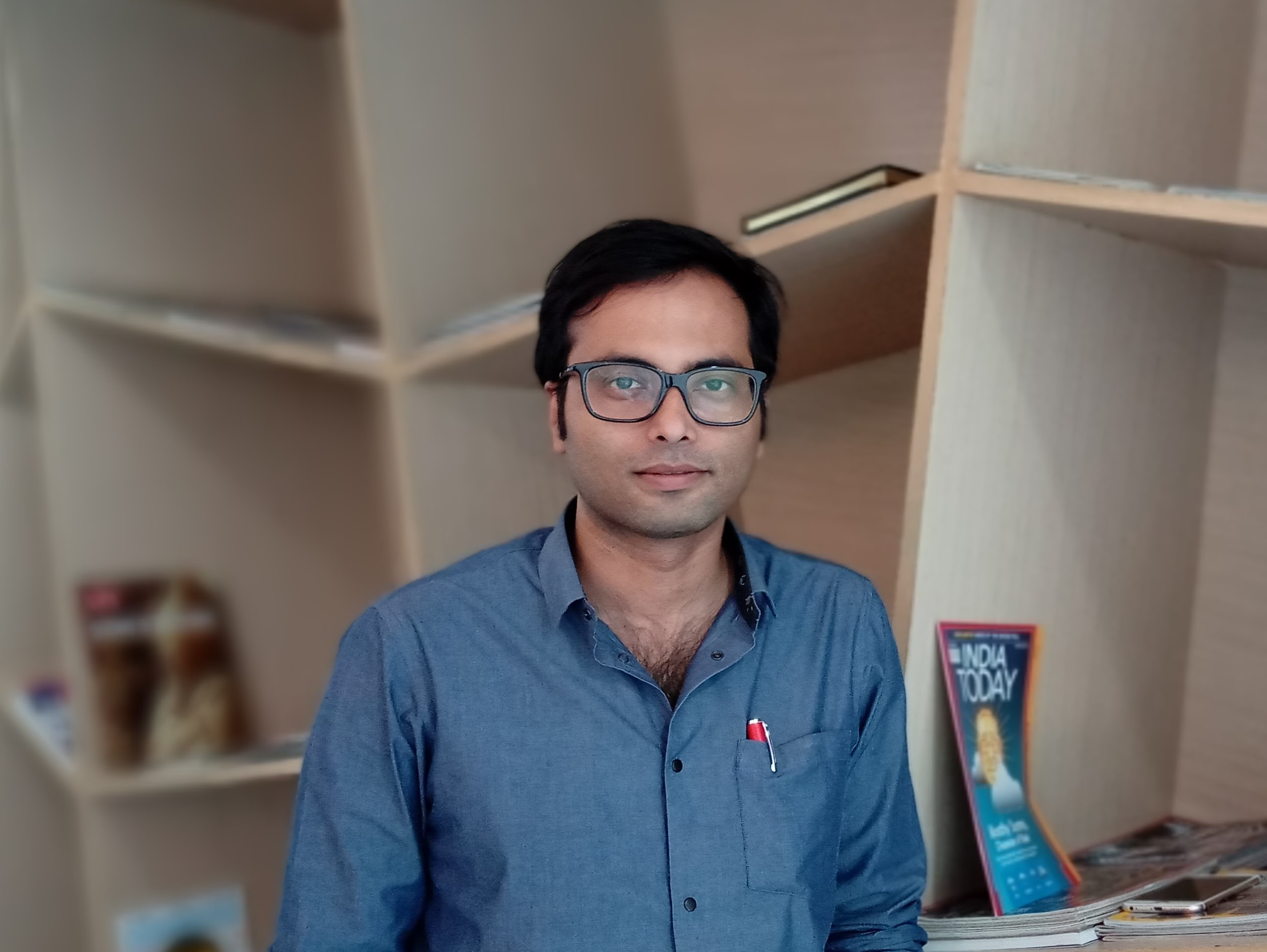
- Education: St. Xavier’s College, Kolkata
- Occupations: Actor; Author; Corporate Communications & Branding
- Known for: How to Communicate Strategically in Corporate World (2020) book; Quarantined: Love in the time of Corona book; Luxe Inferno book; Decoding Luxe book; Dark Luxe book; Hoyto Manush Noy feature film; PostIt! short film; Elixir short film
- Website: mahulbrahma.com

Dr. Mahul Brahma is an author and an Indian actor, working in the Bengali film industry. He has acted in a Bengali feature film Hoyto Manush Noy (2018) and a Bengali Short Film Elixir (2016) the latter was selected for the Cannes Short Film corner, 2016. Mahul's book Decoding Luxe is on the luxury market in India. The book is an in-depth study on the various dimensions of luxury. Mahul's second book Dark Luxe explores the dark side of luxury. His third book Luxe Inferno is a philosophical journey for the true meaning of luxury. These three books are a part of ‘The Luxe Trilogy’. After the trilogy, Dr. Brahma wrote his fourth book Quarantined: Love in the time of Corona, an anthology of six love stories of people locked down during the outbreak of coronavirus. The book was written during the COVID-19 crisis in 2020. Dr. Brahma made his directorial debut with short film PostIt (2018). Dr Brahma’s fifth book How to Communicate Strategically in Corporate World (2020) captures the evolving strategic role of communications in today’s corporate world.

== Early life ==
He is an alumnus of University of Cambridge – Judge Business School, MICA and St Xavier's College. He is currently working in mjunction as the Chief Editor and Head - CSR, Corporate Communications & Branding, Publications for a joint venture of Tata Steel and Steel Authority of India Ltd. (SAIL). Dr. Brahma is winner of Impactful CSR Leader Award and Best Communication Strategist Award in 2019. Dr. Brahma is winner of Best Communication Strategist Award in 2018. He has won the Brand Leadership Award in 2017.

== Actor ==
Brahma came to limelight with his exceptional performance in the Bengali short film Elixir (2016) The film was selected for screening at Cannes Film Festival 2016. He has also acted in a Bengali feature film Hoyto Manush Noy (2018) and a Bengali Film Aarajito (2022).

== Author ==
Mahul's book Decoding Luxe is a guide to luxury in India, exploring luxury from an Indian perspective. The book cites examples of how the Indian Maharajas were the biggest clients of luxury brands such as Rolls-Royce, Cartier, and Louis Vuitton in the early 1900s. The book aims to clear popular misconceptions and states the Indian luxury market driven by the Indian middle class and not the most wealthy. The book also talks about how eCommerce is leading to an exponential growth in the luxury counterfeit market and how luxury is driven by ego and not humility.

Dark Luxe is an anthology of 13 short stories exploring the dark side of luxury. From “price on request” tag, the book takes readers to the other end of the spectrum. These are horror stories and work of fiction, however, interspersed with factual data. In these stories, the author has made luxury products the protagonists, who share their version of the crime.

His third book Luxe Inferno is a philosophical journey for the true meaning of luxe, capturing the Yin and Yang of luxury in two parts. The first part is fiction, a story of a luxury addict through the nine circles of inferno of luxe. This journey finally takes the protagonist to the Purgatory and may be even to the Paradiso. The second part explores various dimensions of luxury classified into – strategy, brands and perception. The genre is a mix of fiction and non-fiction.

His fourth book Quarantined: Love in the time of Corona was written during the time of Corona outbreak in 2020. It is a work of fiction, an anthology of short stories on dark love and how the outbreak of the crisis has re-calibrated the human mind towards survival, ending up heightening instincts and emotions, exposing our dark side, and making our existing lives and relationships unrecognizable.

His fifth book How to Communicate Strategically in Corporate World (2020) deals with the various facets of strategic communications, including crisis and leadership in Covid times, creating mythic value, and increased criticality of the role of communication in today’s corporate world.
