= Elixir (film) =

- Directed by: Anirban Guha
- Screenplay by: Anirban Guha
- Story by: Sinjini Sengupta
- Produced by: Anirban Guha
- Starring: Mahul Brahma; Daminee Benny Basu; Arindom Ghosh; Dr. Koushik Dutta; Koustav Bhattacharya; Sinjini Sengupta
- Cinematography: Ravi Kiran Ayyagari
- Edited by: Sreya Chatterjee
- Music by: Nilanjan Sen, Shantunu Biswas
- Release date: 11 May 2016
- Running time: 34 minutes
- Country: India
- Language: Bengali

Elixir is a 2016 Bengali short film by Anirban Guha, a Delhi-based banker. During his student days, Guha was deeply involved with theatre and stage productions in Delhi and Bangalore. Elixir was selected for the Cannes Short Film Corner 2016 along with six other Bengali films. The cast includes Daminee Benny Basu, Arindom Ghosh, Mahul Brahma, and Dr. Koushik Dutta.

== Plot ==
The film traces the journey of a woman who lives in parallel worlds. The film opens with Srija (Daminee Benny Basu) receiving a phone call from her husband Avik (Arindom Ghosh). Avik asks her whether she can take a break for a few minutes to meet one of his old acquaintances. This unknown man was carrying a parcel for Avik. So he asks Srija to collect it from him. Srija agrees to pick up the parcel. The same evening, Srija waits for the acquaintance at a nearby cafe. As she was waiting, the waiter serves her a glass of water. So far, everything was usual. However, things change when Srija drinks the water ( Elixir). The drink though looked and tasted like water but it was a magical potion that transported Srija to a world of fantasies where she meets Akash (Mahul) and soon sparks fly between them. Srija gradually drifts away from reality and her husband and their relationship hit the rocks. Srija ends up in a mental asylum where she once again, is offered the Elixir of her life.

== Cast ==
- Daminee Benny Basu as Srija
- Arindom Ghosh as Avik
- Mahul Brahma as Akash
- Dr. Koushik Dutta as the Counsellor
- Koustav Bhattacharya as waiter/liftman/hospital ward boy

== Production ==
This 35-minute film is based on a story written by Sinjini Sengupta and directed by Anirban Guha. As a full-time banker, it was a bit difficult for Guha to manage time and travel frequently to Kolkata. So, the entire process from shooting to post-production took an entire year. It started from the middle of 2015. The shooting was completed within 4 days in December, 2015. This was followed by post-production activities. The members of the technical team that worked on the film were located in 3 different cities. Work was mostly carried out through long telephonic discussions, internet conversations and a few hurricane trips to Kolkata over weekends to wrap up the project.
