= Fred Cromer =

American businessman

Fred Cromer (born c. 1964) is an American businessman. He is currently Executive Vice President and Chief Financial Officer for Spirit Airlines. He was previously President of Commercial Aircraft at Bombardier Aerospace, a Canadian aircraft manufacturer.

== Early life ==
He was 51 years old in 2017. He received a Bachelors of Arts degree in Economics from the University of Michigan in 1986 and an MBA degree from DePaul University in Chicago.

== Aviation career ==
He held positions at several U.S. airlines including Northwest Airlines, then Continental Airlines, followed by ExpressJet, where he was Vice President and Chief Financial Officer starting in July 1997. From July 2008 to 2015, he was at ILFC, one of the world's largest commercial aircraft lessors, where he expanded international operations to support key growth regions serving as President since 2011 and previously as Senior Vice President Finance and Chief Financial Officer. On April 9, 2015, he was appointed President of Commercial Aircraft at Bombardier Inc..

He came to Bombardier amid setbacks with its C Series jets and questions to whether the company would even survive, much less if the C Series would even be produced. One of his early actions was to hire Colin Boles, a former colleague in the commercial aircraft leasing business, as chief salesman for Bombardier Aerospace.

Cromer denied that a Boeing trade complaint about the C-Series led to an ownership stake by Airbus.
