= 2017 Myanmar Air Force Shaanxi Y-8 crash =

Air transport disaster over the Andaman Sea

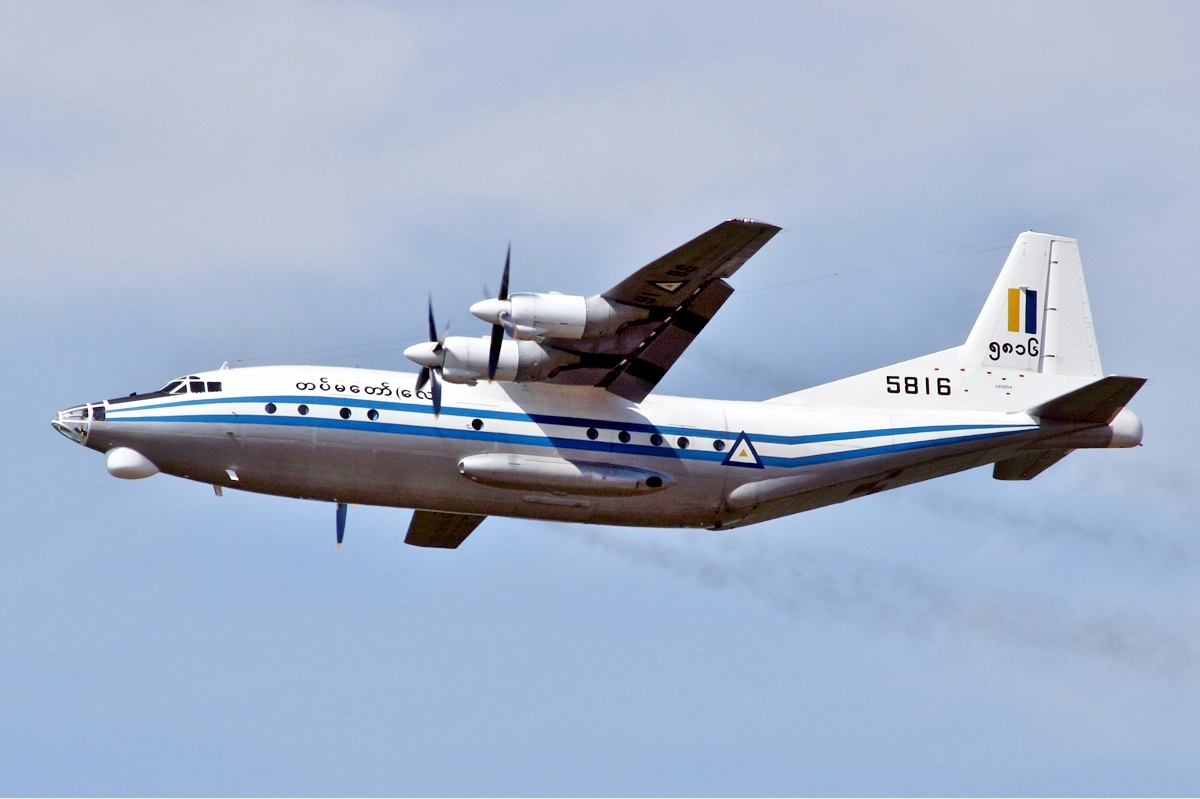
- A Shaanxi Y-8 of the Myanmar Air Force, similar to the aircraft involved in the crash

Accident
- Date: 7 June 2017
- Summary: Crashed into the sea following loss of control in icing conditions
- Site: Andaman Sea, near Dawei, Myanmar; 13°48′N 98°02′E

Aircraft
- Aircraft type: Shaanxi Y-8F-200
- Operator: Myanmar Air Force
- Registration: 5820
- Flight origin: Myeik Airport, Myeik
- Destination: Yangon International Airport, Yangon
- Occupants: 122
- Passengers: 108
- Crew: 14
- Fatalities: 122
- Survivors: 0

On 7 June 2017, a Shaanxi Y-8 aircraft of the Myanmar Air Force crashed on a flight from Myeik to Yangon, killing all 122 people on board. Debris from the aircraft was found in the Andaman Sea, 118 nautical miles (218 km) off Dawei by Myanmar Navy ships. It is the deadliest aviation accident in Myanmar's history.

== Flight and crash ==
A map showing the locations of the Myeik Airport; Yangon International Airport, and where communication was lost.

The aircraft had departed from Myeik for Yangon at 13:06 local time (06:36 UTC). At 13:35, communication was lost with the aircraft when it was 20 nautical miles (37 km) west of Dawei. The aircraft was flying at 18,000 feet (5,500 m) at the time. A search and rescue operation was launched in the Andaman Sea. An unidentified spokesman said that weather was not thought to be a factor in the aircraft's disappearance. No mayday call had been received from the aircraft.

== Aircraft ==
The aircraft involved was a Shaanxi Y-8F-200 of the Myanmar Air Force, serial number 5820. It had been delivered in March 2016 and had flown for over 800 hours at the time of the crash.

== Passengers and crew ==
The aircraft's captain was Lt-Col Nyein Chan and the co-pilots were Lt-Col Soe Thu Win and Maj Thant Zin Htay. The aircraft had 14 crew members.

There were 108 military staff members and their families, including 15 children, on board when the plane lost communication with Dawei airbase. Six officers and 29 other military personnel were on board.

== Search ==
Nine Myanmar Navy ships, and three military aircraft and helicopters were sent to assist in the search. On 7 June, debris from the aircraft was reported to have been found 118 nautical miles (218 km) off Dawei by a Myanmar Navy ship. On 8 June, it was reported that 29 bodies had been found.

The wreckage was scattered over a wide area, indicating that the aircraft might have disintegrated in flight at altitude. Storms in the area hindered the search. By 9 June, hopes of finding survivors were fading. It was later reported that there were no survivors. Instead, bodies and debris were found scattered in the Andaman Sea, and some washed ashore.

This was the deadliest aviation accident to occur in Myanmar, surpassing the crash of a Fokker F27 Friendship 500 in 1987, which killed 49 people.

On 15 June, a fishing boat helping with the search found the tail of the aircraft off Myinkhwar Aww Bay. The cockpit voice recorder and flight data recorder were recovered on 18 June.

== Investigation ==
Investigator determined that control of the aircraft was lost after it entered thick storm clouds and encountered icing conditions.
