= Elixir (Iasos album) =

Studio album by Iasos
- Released: 4 February 1983
- Genre: New-age; Minimal; Ambient; Drone; Space music
- Length: 56:00
- Label: Inter-Dimensional Music
- Producer: Iasos

Iasos chronology
Essence of Spring (1983)	Elixir (1983)	Lazaris: A Spark Of Love (1986)

Professional ratings
Review scores
Source	Rating
Allmusic	4.5/5 stars

Elixir (also titled Wave #2: Elixir and Elixir: The Visionary Gateway to Celestial Realms) is a studio album by new-age musician Iasos. It was released on cassette and CD on his own label Inter-Dimensional Music in February 1983. Featuring quasi-symphonic arrangements, it is one of the more positive-sounding albums by Iasos. AllMusic picked the album as an essential Iasos recording.

== Music ==
The second half of "Helios & Vesta" is a reworked version of "The Royal Court of The Goddess Vesta" from Jeweled Space (1981). "The Angels of Comfort" is the original version of the same-titled track on Angelic Music (1978). "*Crystal*White*Fire*Light*" was previously released on Crystal Love (1979) and "The Descent of Spring" was released on Essence of Spring, also in 1983.

== Track listing ==
No.	Title	Length
1.	"Helios & Vesta"	12:24
2.	"The Descent of Spring"	3:20
3.	"The Angels of Comfort"	10:59
4.	"Procession on the Horizon"	10:59
5.	"Blue Fire Realms"	3:37
6.	"Crystal*White*Fire*Light"	13:41
