= Alain Bellemare =

Canadian businessman

Alain M. Bellemare
- Born: 1962 (age 63–64); Canada
- Known for: President and CEO of Bombardier Inc.

Alain M. Bellemare was the president and CEO of Bombardier Inc. He joined Delta Air Lines in January 2021 as president-international.

== Early life and education ==
Bellemare received an undergraduate degree from Sherbrooke University. He received an MBA from McGill University in 1993.

== Career ==
Beginning in 1984, Bellemare served 12 years in a variety of engineering and manufacturing positions with Kraft Foods Canada and Crown Holdings Canada.

On January 1, 2009, Bellemare became the president of Hamilton Sundstrand.

In September 2011, Bellemare became the president and COO of UTC Propulsion and Aerospace Systems at United Technologies.

From July 26, 2012, to January 31, 2015, Bellemare served as the CEO and president of UTC Propulsion & Aerospace Systems at United Technologies. The position was eliminated in January 2015.

On February 13, 2015, Bellemare became the president and CEO of Bombardier Inc.

In May 2017, Bellmare's compensation of US$9.5 million was criticized while the Government of Quebec invested in Bombardier.

In November 2018, an attempt by Bellmare to sell 7 million shares of Bombardier was investigated by regulators.

In March 2020, Bellemare was removed from his function.
