= Elixir Aircraft Elixir =

Type of aircraft

Elixir
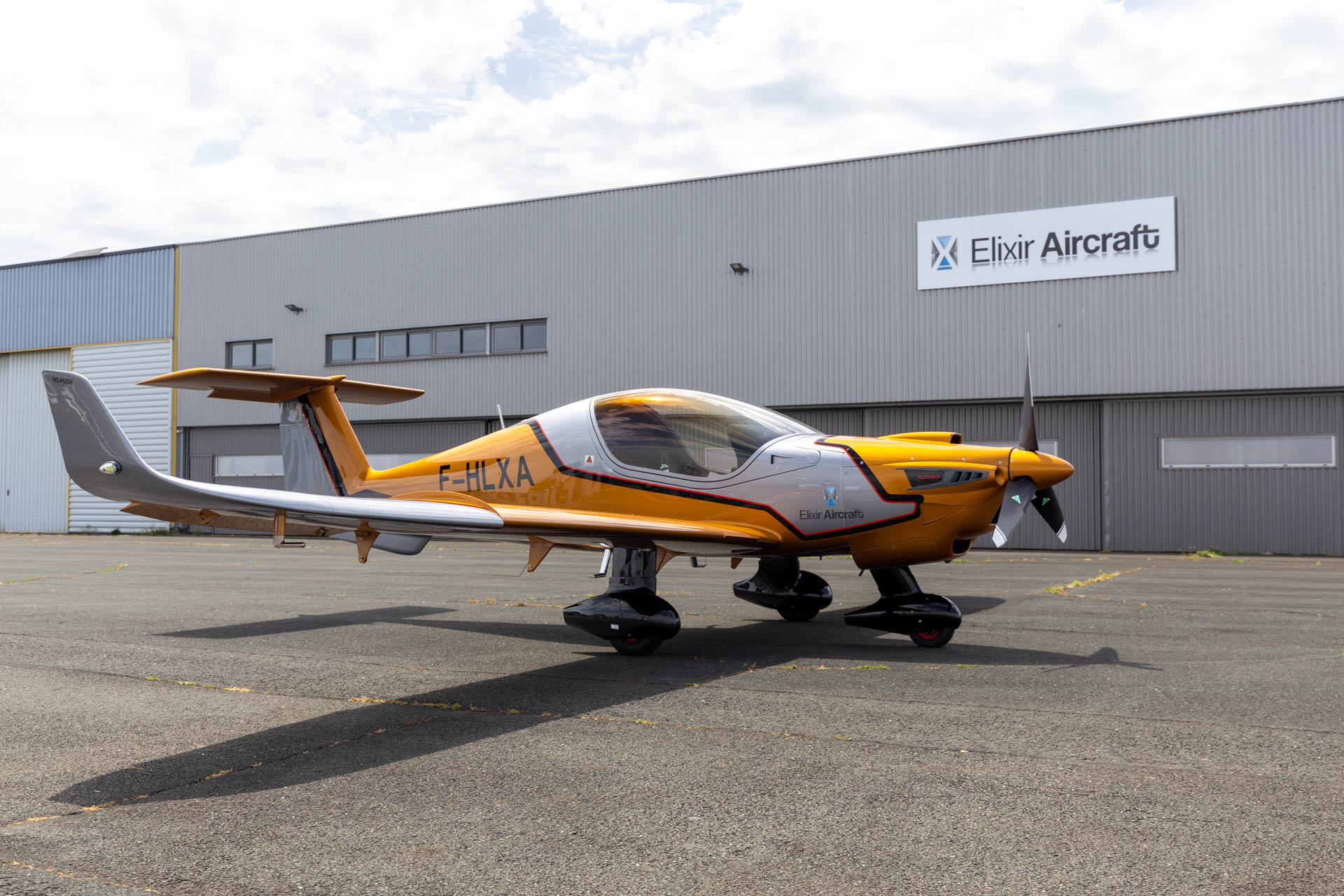
- The Elixir

General information
- Type: Light aircraft
- National origin: France
- Manufacturer: Elixir Aircraft
- Primary users: ATO & FTO Flying clubs, private pilots

History
- Introduction date: 20 March 2020
- First flight: 31 August 2017

The Elixir is a French two-seat, fixed-tricycle gear general aviation airplane, designed and manufactured by Elixir Aircraft in La Rochelle The aircraft is certified CS-23 by the European Aviation Safety Agency since 2020 and received the FAR Part-23 certification by the FAA during EAA AirVenture ("Oshkosh") 2025.

Intended primarily for flight training and personal touring, the Elixir is notable for its Carbon "OneShot" technology, which uses Carbon Fiber to mold the entire wing and fuselage components in single pieces, significantly reducing the number of parts compared to traditional aircraft.

== Design and development ==
=== Development ===
Elixir Aircraft was founded in 2015 with the goal of creating a fourth-generation aircraft that addressed the complexity and aging fleet issues of traditional general aviation. The prototype first flew in 2017 from La Rochelle Airport. After extensive testing, the aircraft received its EASA CS-23 certification in March 2020 and its FAA certification in July 2025.

The initial aircraft production is at Périgny, next to La Rochelle. It is intended to move production to a new factory at La Rochelle airport

=== Design ===
Unlike traditional aluminium aircraft (riveted metal sheets) or earlier composite aircraft (bonded halves), the Elixir uses a technology called "Carbon Oneshot". This process allows major structures such as the wing and the fuselage to be moulded as single continuous pieces. This design philosophy reduces the airframe part count from thousands (in traditional metal aircraft) to fewer than 1000, aiming to lower maintenance costs and structural failure points.

The aircraft features a T-tail configuration and an unintentional spin-resistant low-wing monoplane design. It is powered by a Rotax 912 iS engine with a three-bladed MT-Propeller tractor propeller, offering fuel efficiency suitable for flight schools. The cockpit is designed with a focus on ergonomics, featuring a full glass cockpit (Garmin G3X) as standard.

Safety features include an explosion-resistant fuel tank and a Ballistic Recovery Systems (BRS) parachute.

== Variants ==
- Elixir 912 iS: The standard production model powered by a 100 hp Rotax 912 iS Sport engine. This variant is EASA CS-23 certified and is approved for both Visual Flight Rules (VFR) and Night VFR (NVFR) operations.
- Elixir 915 iS: A higher-performance variant powered by the turbocharged 141 hp (105 kW) Rotax 915 iS engine. As of now, this model is undergoing certification.
- Turbine: A development version powered by a turboprop engine (TurboTech TP-90). The prototype completed its maiden flight and is currently in the flight testing phase. This project is also associated with research into Sustainable Aviation Fuel (SAF) usage.

== Training ==
The Elixir was designed specifically to address the needs of modern flight training organizations, aiming to replace aging fleets of legacy aircraft. It is increasingly adopted by flight schools and aero clubs due to its significantly lower operating costs, driven by the fuel-efficient Rotax engine and the reduced maintenance requirements of its "OneShot" carbon airframe structure. The inclusion of a full glass cockpit is considered advantageous for training student pilots, as it familiarizes them with the avionics environments found in modern commercial airliners.

== Operators ==
Major training organizations have selected the aircraft for their training programs:

- Cirrus Aviation
- Omni Aviation Training Center
- Airways Aviation
- ENAC
- Egnatia Aviation
- Leading Edge Aviation
- Rubric Aviation

== Specifications - Elixir 912 iS ==
General Characteristics
Category	100 hp
Crew	1
Passengers	2
Length	6.06 m (19 ft 11 in)
Wingspan	8.48 m (27 ft 82 in)
Height	1.90 m (2 ft 23 in)

Performance characteristics
Category	100 hp
Powerplant	Rotax 912iS
Propeller	3-bladed MT-Propeller
Fuel Capacity	94L (24.8 US gal)
Maximum Range (75% power)	793NM
Speed at 75% Cruise	122kt
Fuel Consumption at 75% Cruise	12.5L/h (3.3 US gal)
Maximum Range (85% power)	610NM
Speed at 85% Cruise	125kt
Fuel Consumption at 85% Cruise	15L/h (3.9 US gal)
Maximum Range (50% power)	809NM
Speed at 50% Cruise	110kt
Fuel Consumption at 50% Cruise	11L/h (2.9 US gal)
Climb Rate	950–1300 ft/min
Load Factor	+4 / -2 G
Service Ceiling	10,000 ft

== Accidents and Incidents ==
The Elixir has had 5 hull losses; all during the landing phase of flight.

- 14 February 2024 - F-HKEC, During a post-maintenance check flight departing from La Rochelle (LFBH), the crew declared a "Pan Pan" emergency during the approach phase. The BEA report indicates the accident was caused by an in-flight disconnection of the elevator control following the maintenance intervention. As a result of the control difficulties the aircraft made a hard landing, resulting in the collapse of the nose gear and a runway excursion.
- 7 March 2025 - F-HLOT, The pilot was practicing touch and go's at Le Mans-Arnage Airport (LFRM), at night on runway 20. When the pilot was about to increase power, the aircraft veered off the runway centreline. The pilot returned to the centreline but the aeroplane sideslipped for a second time and suffered a runway excursion. The nose gear was substantially damaged. The final BEA investigation report determined the cause as a loss of directional control on the ground.
- 2 May 2025 - F-HCDN, Shortly after taking off from Amboise (LFEF), at the end of the initial climb, the warning light “Lane A” illuminated. The pilot turned back to make an emergency landing on runway 10 at Amboise. The aircraft bounced during the landing and veered off the runway. The nose gear broke and the aircraft overturned. The final BEA investigation report determined the cause as a loss of directional control on the ground.
- 2 September 2025 - G-RLXB, During landing at Fife Airport (EGPJ), the aircraft veered off the runway onto the grass, causing the nose wheel to detach. The AAIB recorded the event as a loss of directional control during landing.
- 1 October 2026 - F-WZAG, During a routine production test flight at Rochefort Saint Agnant Air Base (LFDN) the aircraft came down short of the runway after a severe mechanical malfunction. The crash site was located in the adjoining Air Base 721 approximately 30m before the perimeter fence of La Rochelle airport. Both test pilots died in the accident. On 2 October 2026 EASA and UKCAA issued airworthiness directives grounding all Elixir aircraft indefinitely.
