= Supplemental air carrier =

US charter/scheduled airline hybrid (1944–1978)

Graph 1: RPM = revenue passenger mile = one customer flown one mile. A 2000-mile flight with 150 customers creates 150×2000 = 300,000 RPMs. Supplemental market share was modest, often not even commanding a majority of the charter market. Regulatory changes let scheduled carriers capture most of the 1960s Vietnam War military charter boom, clearly visible in the graph. Note total charter share dropped sharply in late 1970s deregulation. By contrast, 2023 US industry charter RPM share was a much smaller 0.5%

Supplemental air carriers, until 1955 known as irregular air carriers, and until 1946 as nonscheduled air carriers or nonskeds, were a type of United States airline from 1944 to 1978, regulated by the Civil Aeronautics Board (CAB), a now-defunct federal agency that then tightly controlled almost all US commercial air transport. From 1964 onward, these airlines were just charter carriers, but until 1964 they had limited but flexible ability to offer scheduled service, making them hybrids. In some ways they were the opposite of what the law then said an airline should be. Airlines then required CAB certification, but over 150 nonskeds exploited a loophole to simply start operating. The CAB determined where certificated carriers flew and what they charged. For the most part, irregular carriers flew where they wanted and charged what they wanted. CAB-certificated passenger carriers almost never died (the CAB preferentially awarded desirable routes to weak scheduled passenger carriers and if they got in serious trouble the CAB let them merge with a stronger carrier) but over 90% of supplementals did.

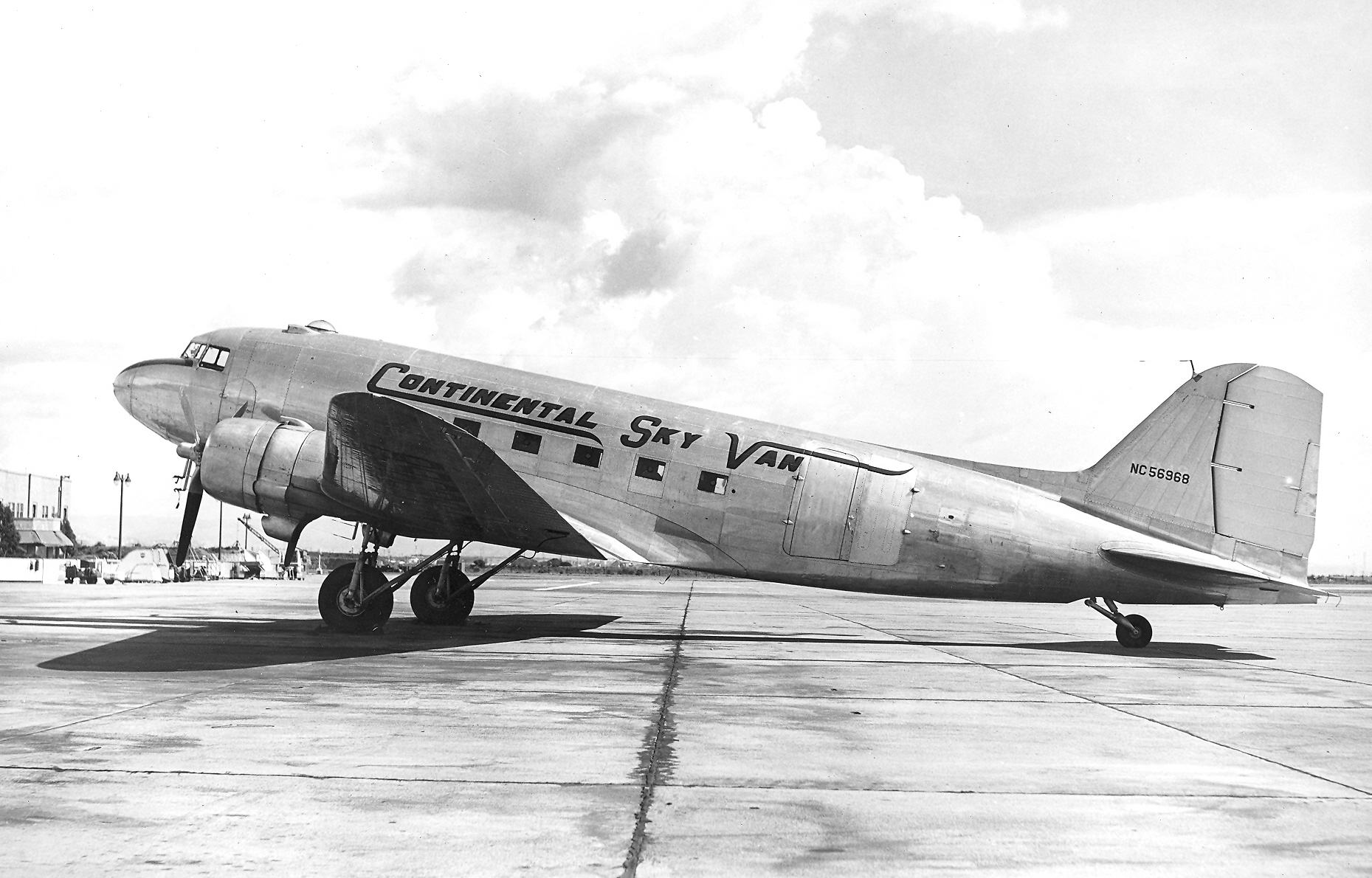
Continental Sky-Van (no relation to Continental Air Lines) was an Oakland airline started by ex-Army Air Force pilots that operated from February to December 1946.

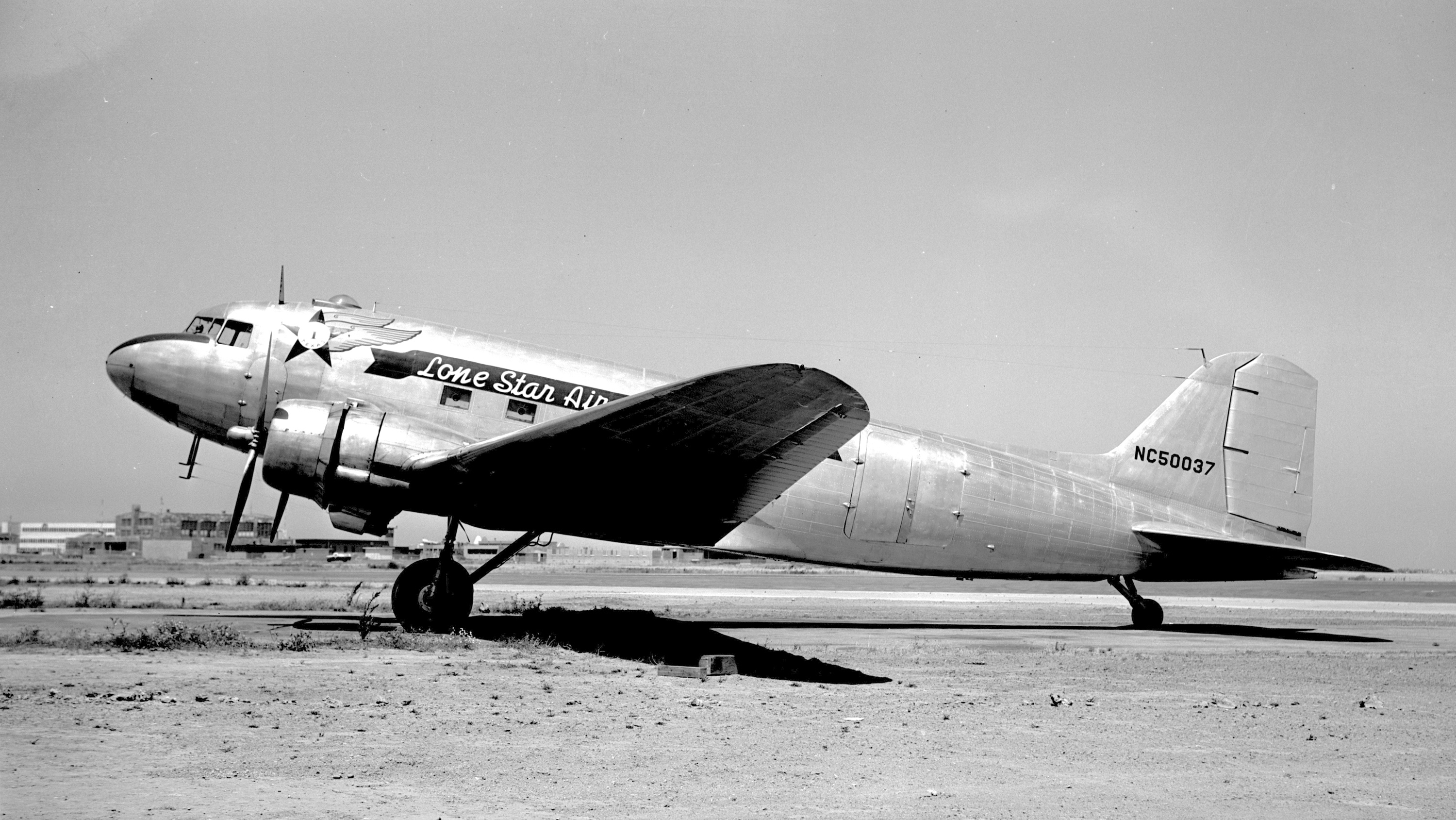
Lone Star Air Cargo Lines (as distinct from Lone Star Airlines or Lone Star Airways) was Dallas-based and lasted from early 1946 to early 1947—its bankruptcy auction featured seven DC-3s.

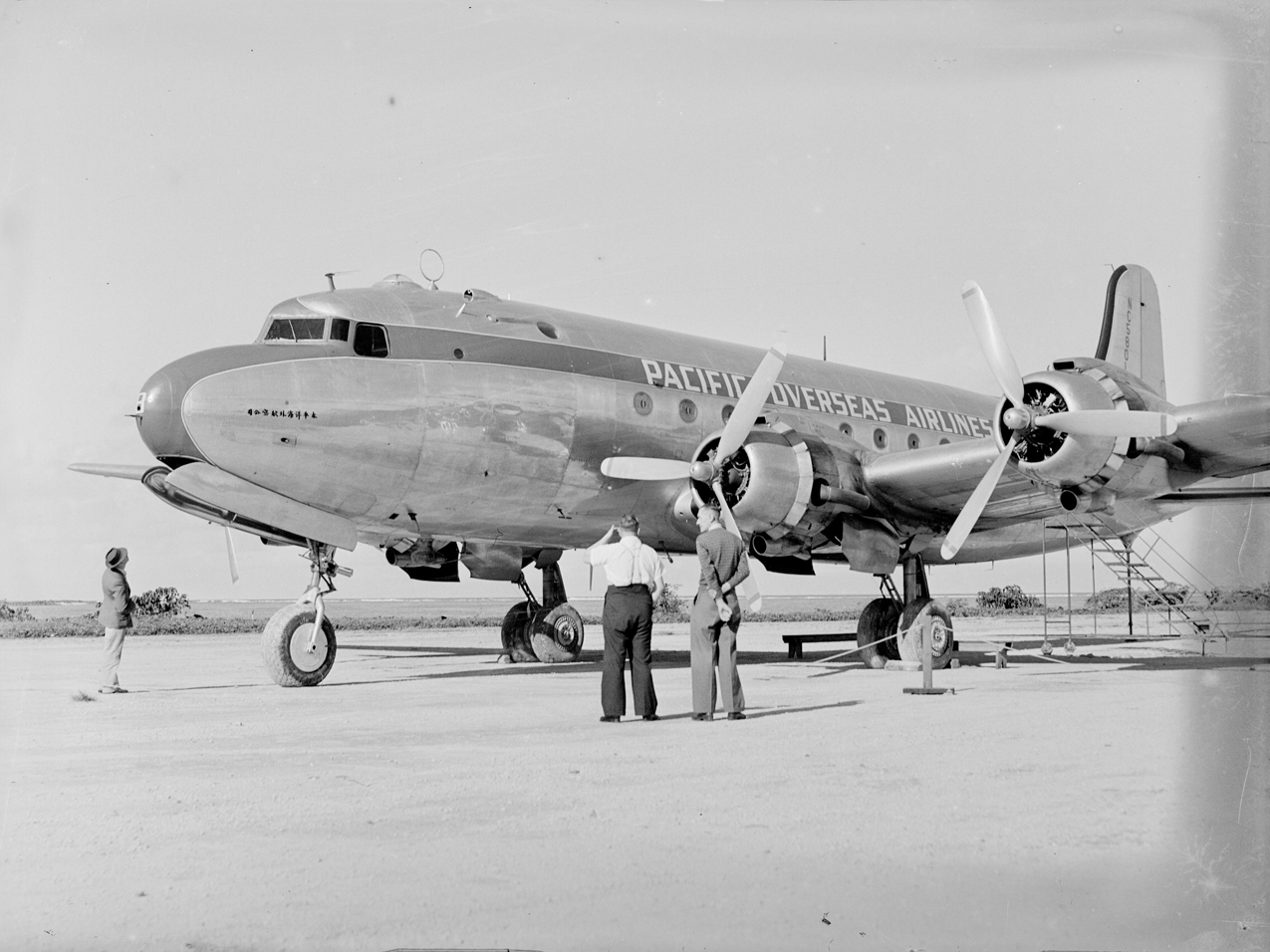
Ontario-based Pacific Overseas Airlines emerged from Consairway, the pioneering military airline division of Convair. A 1946 contract to fly 15 C-54s for Air Transport Command instantly made POA one of the largest nonskeds. POA made Ontario an Asian gateway by flying its own aircraft to Shanghai, Manila and Bangkok. But airline operations ended in 1948 after a few poor choices. A Thai joint-venture, Pacific Overseas Airlines (Siam), survived, and after other transactions turned into Thai International, making POA a little-known ancestor of the Thai flag carrier.

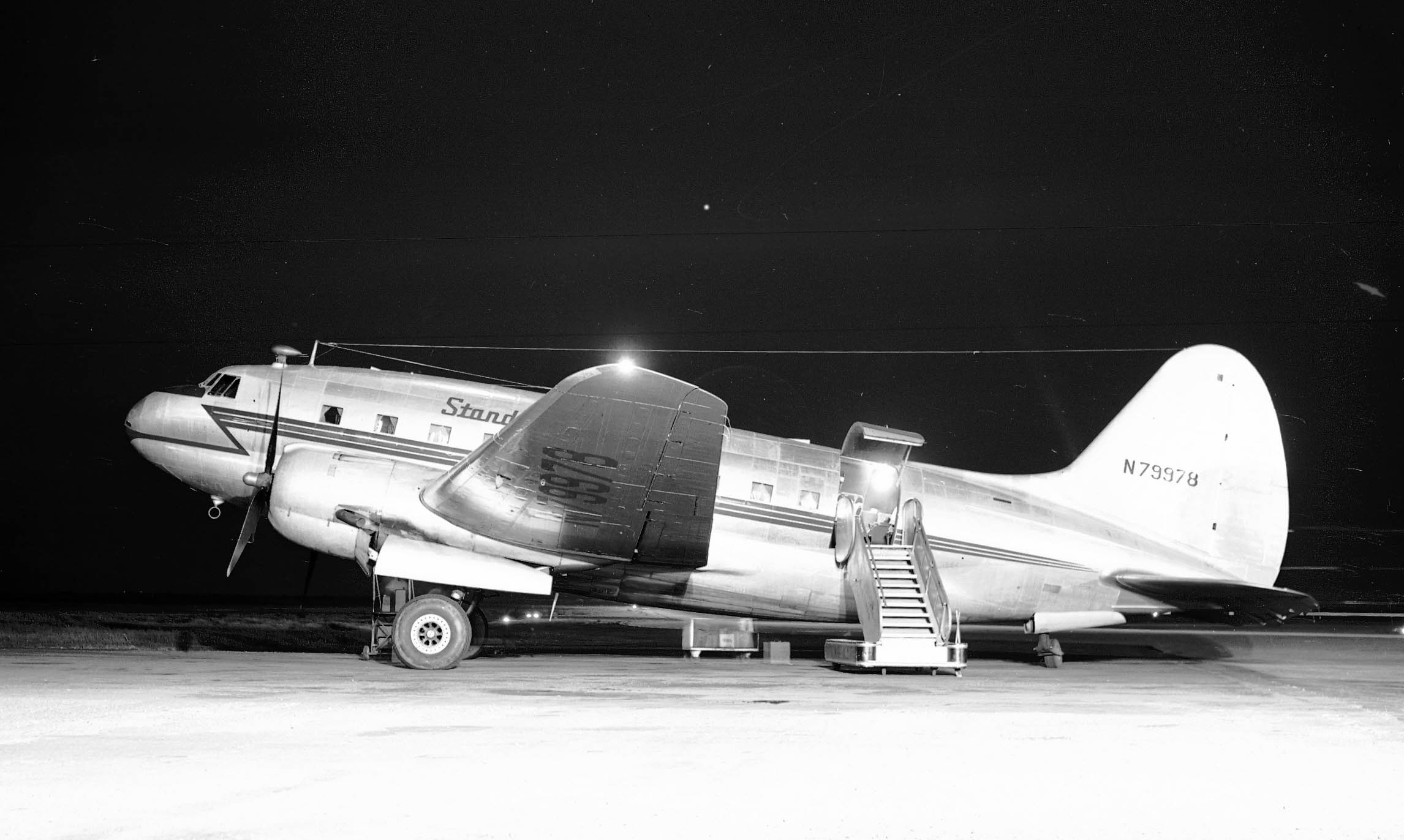
Standard Air Lines (no relation to the 1920s airline or Standard Airways) was the first irregular carrier shut down (in July 1949) by the CAB for scheduled flights. Its partners helped found North American Airlines Group. This aircraft crashed two months after photo date, killing 35 of 48 on board

The legacy of supplemental air carriers includes coach class (all US air travel was first class before the nonskeds) and a share of the credit for inspiring 1979 US airline deregulation. Such carriers made little impact on the US airline system after deregulation and no former supplemental carrier survives, the last being World Airways which ceased operation in 2014. All original US scheduled cargo airlines (such as Flying Tiger Lines) also started as irregular airlines. The term "supplemental" was replaced with "charter" in the Airline Deregulation Act of 1978, but survives in the regulations of the Federal Aviation Administration (FAA) (US airlines are dual certificated, with economic certification by the Department of Transportation (as successor to the CAB) and operational certification by the FAA).

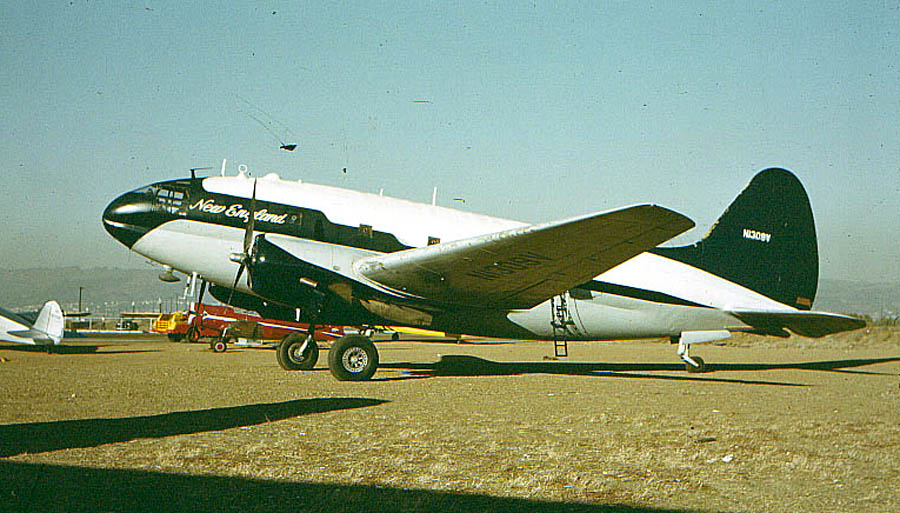
The CAB suspended New England Air Express's operating rights in 1951 for mistreating passengers, a judgment affirmed by a Federal appeals court in 1952

The market share of supplementals was small (see Graph 1), but the carriers attracted much attention during the regulated era ending 1978:

- They offered low fares and competition in a system of high fares and little competition, providing a small amount of relative freedom in an otherwise tightly regulated regime.
- US scheduled carriers constantly railed against the supplementals as a threat (although once regulations were relaxed the scheduled carriers quickly overcame the supplementals).
- IATA (International Air Transport Association), then an international airline cartel, spent the 1960s/1970s fighting supplementals on the North Atlantic.
- Supplementals operated on the edge of legality:
  - Up through the 1950s, some flew scheduled service well beyond what regulations permitted, some in open defiance of the CAB, earning an outlaw reputation.
  - Charters captured over 30% of the transatlantic market in the 1970s. Regulations made it hard to access charters. Some consumers lied to qualify for low fare charters. When CAB enforcement agents detected this, they prosecuted the supplementals.
- Prominent personalities were connected to supplementals. For example:
  - World Airways's owner Ed Daly flew in supplies and flew out orphans during the fall of South Vietnam.
  - Future billionaire/Las Vegas titan Kirk Kerkorian made his first fortune selling Trans International Airlines.
- Spies owned one: in 1973 the CIA was exposed as owning supplemental Southern Air Transport.

== History ==
=== Context ===
The Civil Aeronautics Act of 1938 instituted tight federal control over almost all US commercial air transport, initially by the Civil Aeronautics Authority, but that power passed to the Civil Aeronautics Board (CAB) in 1940. Airlines were required to be certificated by the CAB, but those flying scheduled service prior to the 1938 Act were grandfathered and the CAB certificated 19 domestic scheduled passenger airlines this way in 1939–1941. The 16 still flying after World War II were the domestic trunk carriers, and in many ways the CAB regulated the US airline industry in their interests. In the period 1943–1950, the CAB certificated another set of domestic scheduled airlines, the local service carriers (initially called feeder carriers), to fly routes to small cities. Competition was suppressed; the CAB determined ticket prices and what routes scheduled airlines flew.

Post-World War II demand overwhelmed the trunk carriers and the CAB, which was "lethargic" and "stunted" by the war. For instance, there was a month-long waiting list for air travel from Washington, DC to Dallas. In 1946, Fortune magazine had a 12-page article about industry's struggle to handle massive post-war demand.

=== The nonscheduled loophole ===
In theory, after World War II, the trunk carriers and (as they were certificated) the feeders were the only airlines providing US domestic scheduled service. But under a pre-war CAB exemption, nonscheduled carriers did not need a certificate, an allowance made so companies like fixed base operators (FBOs) could offer small aircraft charters without CAB approval. In August 1944, the CAB launched an investigation of the post-war role of nonskeds. But as war ended, easy availability of war-surplus aircraft and war-trained pilots resulted in a flourishing of operators using the nonscheduled loophole. Some had transport-class aircraft like DC-3s, and some flew scheduled service. The study concluded May 1946 with the CAB coining the term "irregular" for such operators (versus "regular" service seen as typical of scheduled flights) and required them to register (essentially to gather data) and subjected them to the parts of the 1938 Act that forbade unfair and deceptive practices. The CAB also made an example of two nonskeds, finding they illegally engaged in scheduled service.

The CAB issued a total of 162 "letters of registration" for "large" irregular carriers (those with transport-type equipment), as distinct from FBO-type operators for which the exemption was intended, finally freezing approvals in August 1948. As of June 1948 (the date of its 1948 annual report) the CAB had issued 142 such letters, but only 109 of the carriers were active. The CAB issued another dozen letters to non-certificated pure cargo carriers. By contrast, there were 42 certificated scheduled service carriers in operation. The 142 registered irregular carriers had a total of 356 Douglas DC-3, DC-4 and Curtiss C-46 aircraft between them, compared to over 1000 transport aircraft in domestic service and international service by scheduled operators, whose fleets also included some more modern types, e.g. Lockheed Constellations, Martin 2-0-2s, DC-6s and Convair 240s. The CAB banned irregular carriers from international service without specific permission. The irregulars clustered in big markets like Puerto Rico (flying migrants to the mainland with fares as low as $45 southbound, $85 northbound vs certificated carrier fares of $133), transcontinental (Los Angeles to New York as low as $88 one way vs scheduled carrier $143) and flying people and freight to Alaska.

=== Coach ===
Graph 2: RPM = revenue passenger mile Coach class was an irregular carrier innovation. The CAB forced scheduled carriers to adopt it, but still took over a decade to become the prevailing class

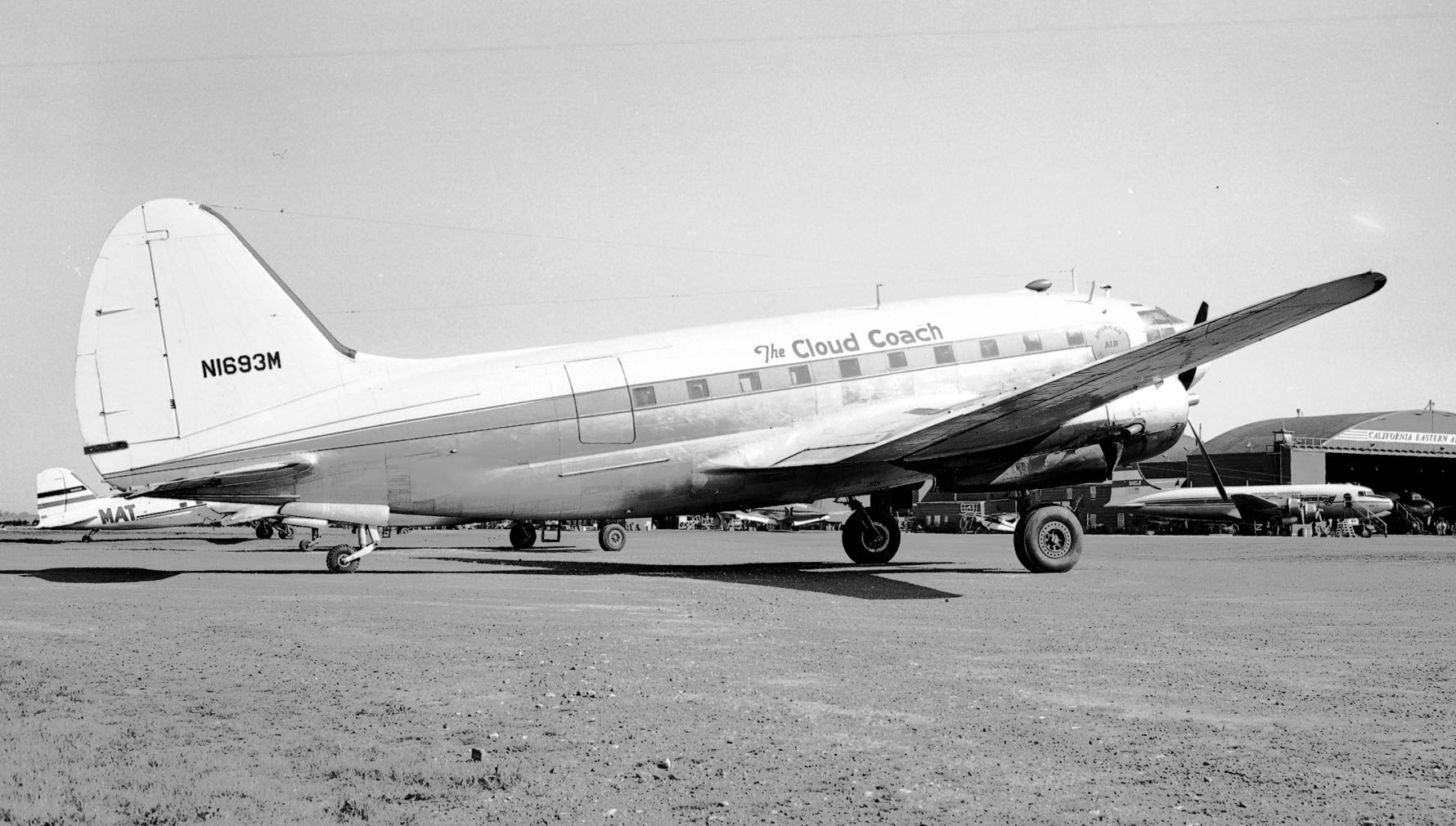
American Air Transport and Flight School flew under the name of Miami-based Cloud Coach, a ticket agent for irregular air carriers. The CAB revoked the airline in 1952 for flying scheduled Florida flights

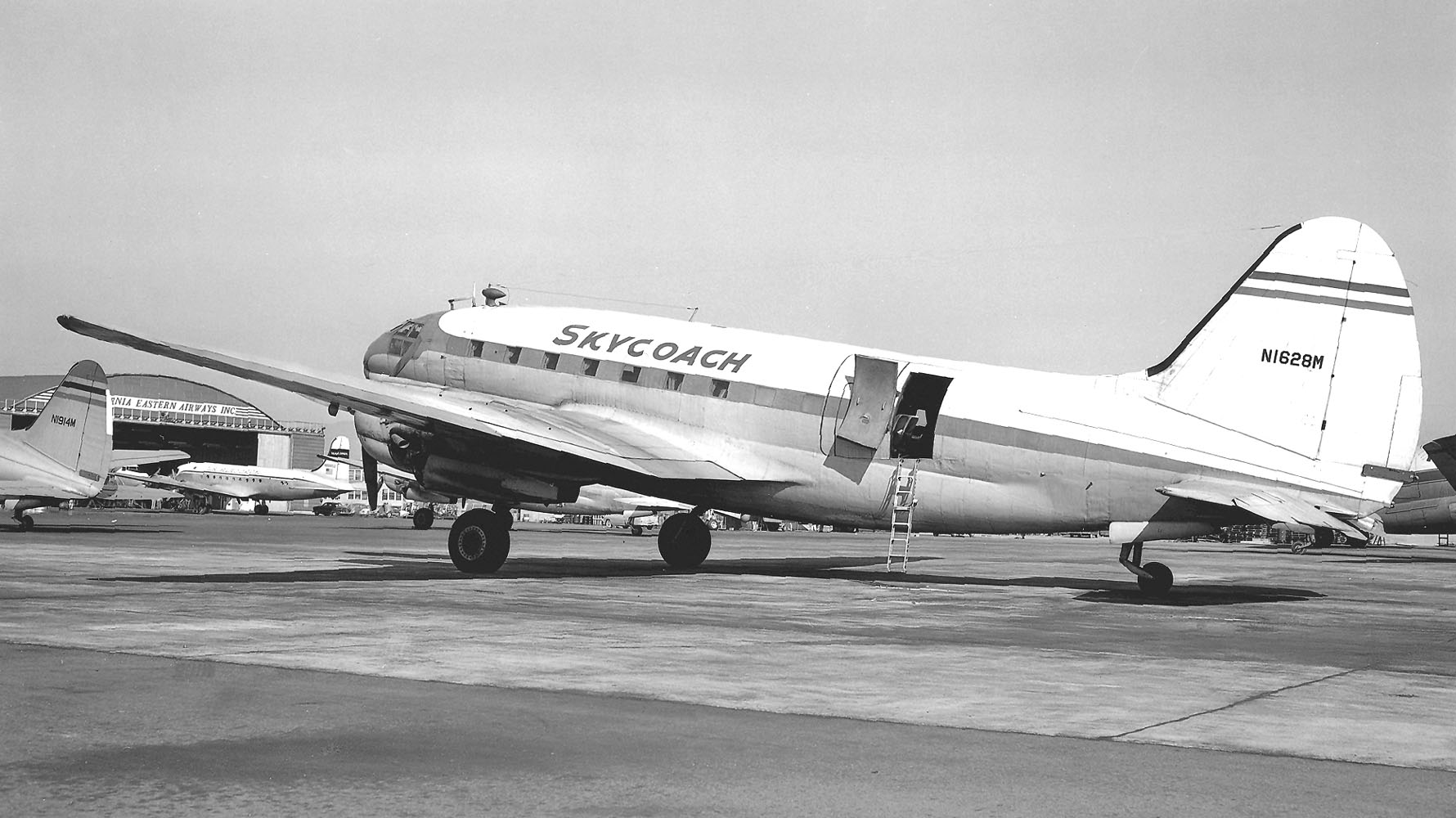
The CAB traced this aircraft, "Two Eight Mike" (for its registration), as it transitioned from Monarch Air Service to Currey Air Transport in 1952 within the Skycoach combine.

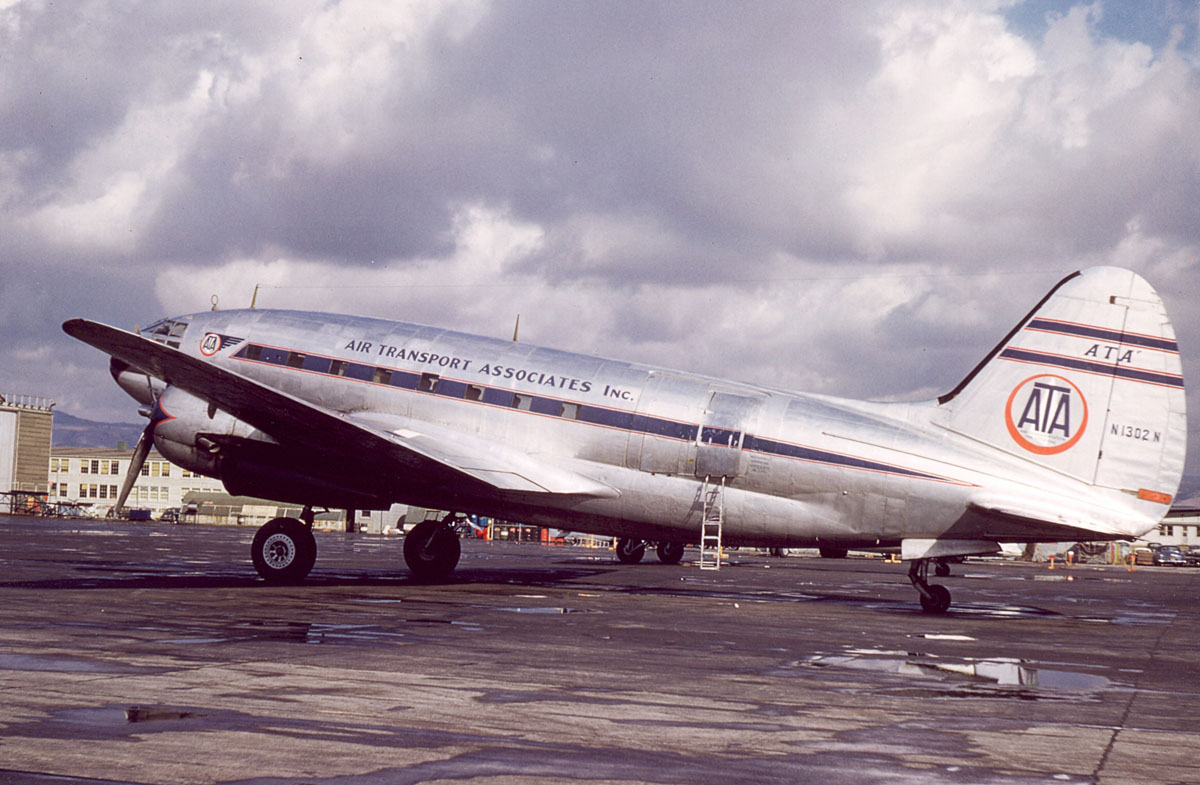
Not to be confused with fellow irregular carriers Associated Air Transport or Associated Airways, Air Transport Associates lost its letter of registration in 1953 after a failed court appeal of a 1951 CAB enforcement action. The carrier was a Seattle to Alaska specialist.

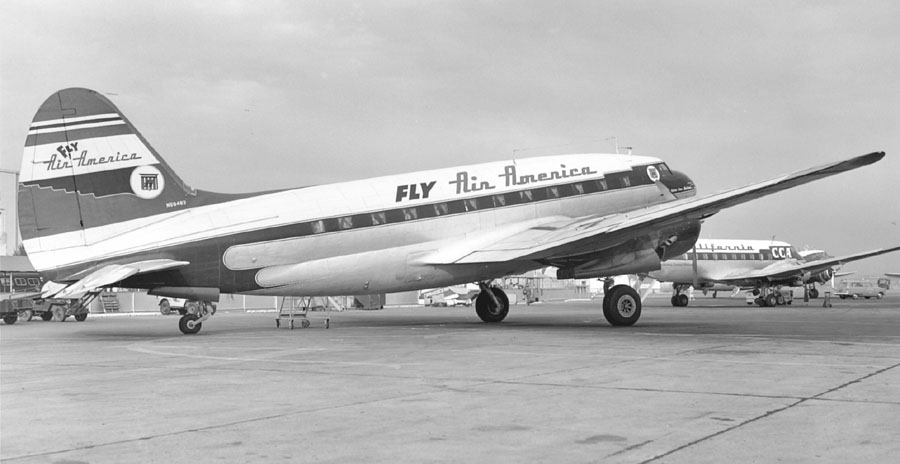
The CAB shut down Air America in January 1954 for scheduled New York-Los Angeles flights. The carrier flew for the North Star combine but was unrelated to the later CIA airline

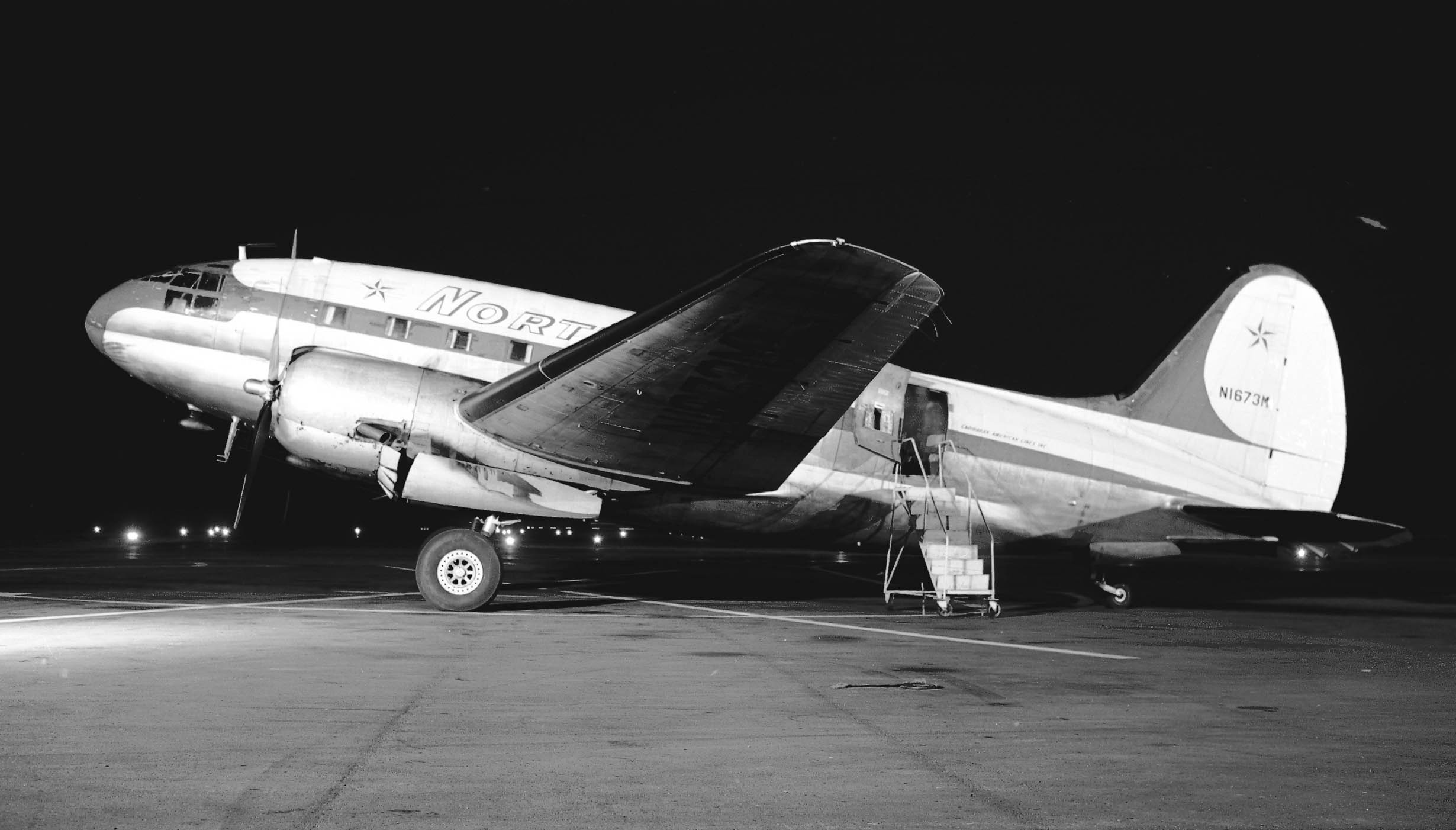
Caribbean American Lines (titles just aft of door) flew for the North Star combine. The CAB shut it down early 1956, after earlier subjecting it to stringent conditions as an alternative to revocation for flying scheduled service New York-Chicago-Los Angeles

Irregular carriers could charge low fares because of high-density seating and no-frills service. Seats were four-abreast in DC-3s and five-abreast in DC-4s (one more than normal) with reduced seat pitch, e.g. from 40 inches to 33. This became known as coach class. With interior reconfiguration, a DC-4 could carry as many as 80 people, up from 50–55. It was generally conceded that irregular carriers invented coach class and the resulting demand expansion. The CAB had to push certificated carriers to offer coach, sensitive to the fact that only the wealthy could afford first class. Coach RPMs only exceeded first class (see Graph 2) in 1960, but even then the CAB was still having to push scheduled carriers to expand coach class.

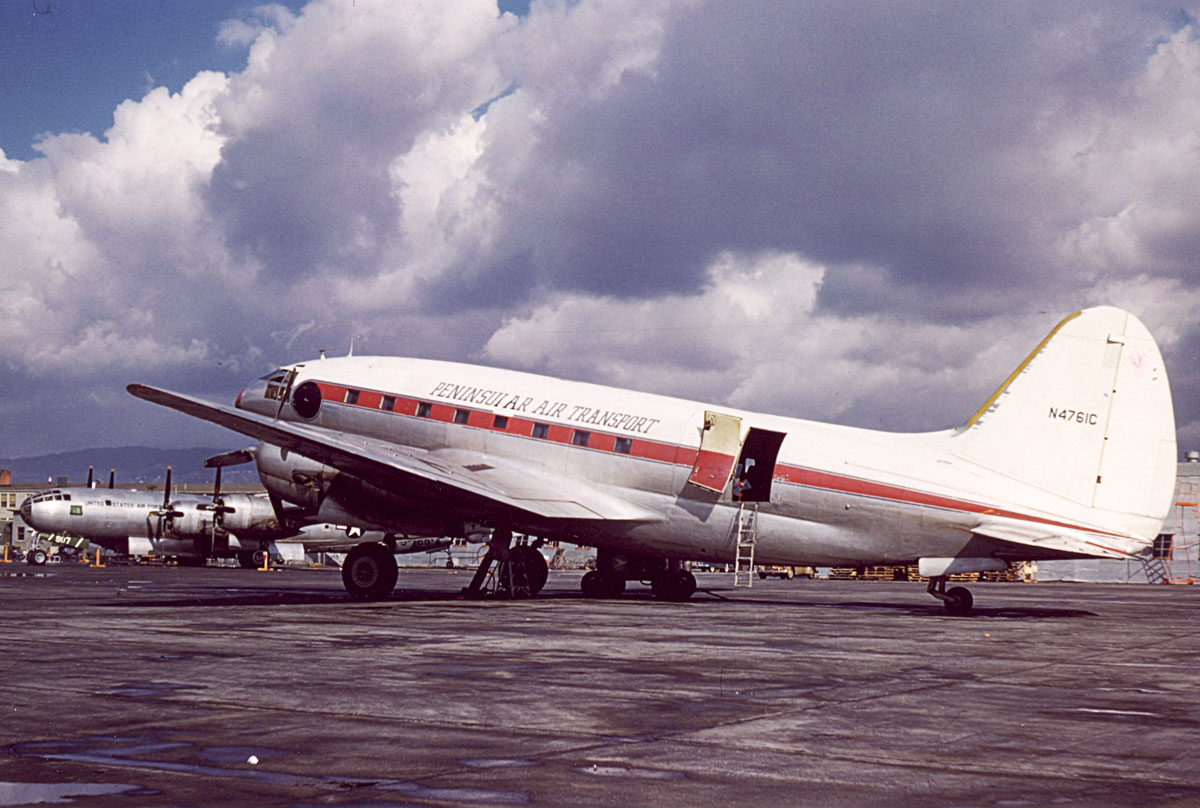
Miami-based Peninsular Air Transport was part of the family-run Peninsular Group combine providing scheduled service, primarily Miami-New York/Chicago. The CAB revoked its authority March 1957.

=== 1949–1955: from death sentence to supplemental ===
From 1949 to 1955, the CAB swung between suppression and accommodation of irregular air carriers. In 1949, it eliminated the original blanket exemption that enabled irregular air carriers and required each to apply for an individual exemption. 95 did so, but 46 others fell by the wayside. This was seen as a “death penalty” and by 1951, most of the surviving irregulars were either subject to an enforcement action or preliminary disapproval of their individual application. The CAB also shut down specific offenders, like Standard Air Lines in 1949, Viking Air Lines in 1950 and others for scheduled service and other violations. By 1958, the CAB had shut down 18 irregulars or supplementals this way. But the irregulars had their supporters, like the Justice Department. 1949 US Senate hearings credited irregulars with, among other things:

- Allowing those that could previously not afford it to fly
- Playing a key role in the Berlin airlift, in contrast to the subsidized scheduled carriers
- Low air freight costs allowing Alaskans to eat fresh fruits and vegetables. Alaska's governor was big fan.

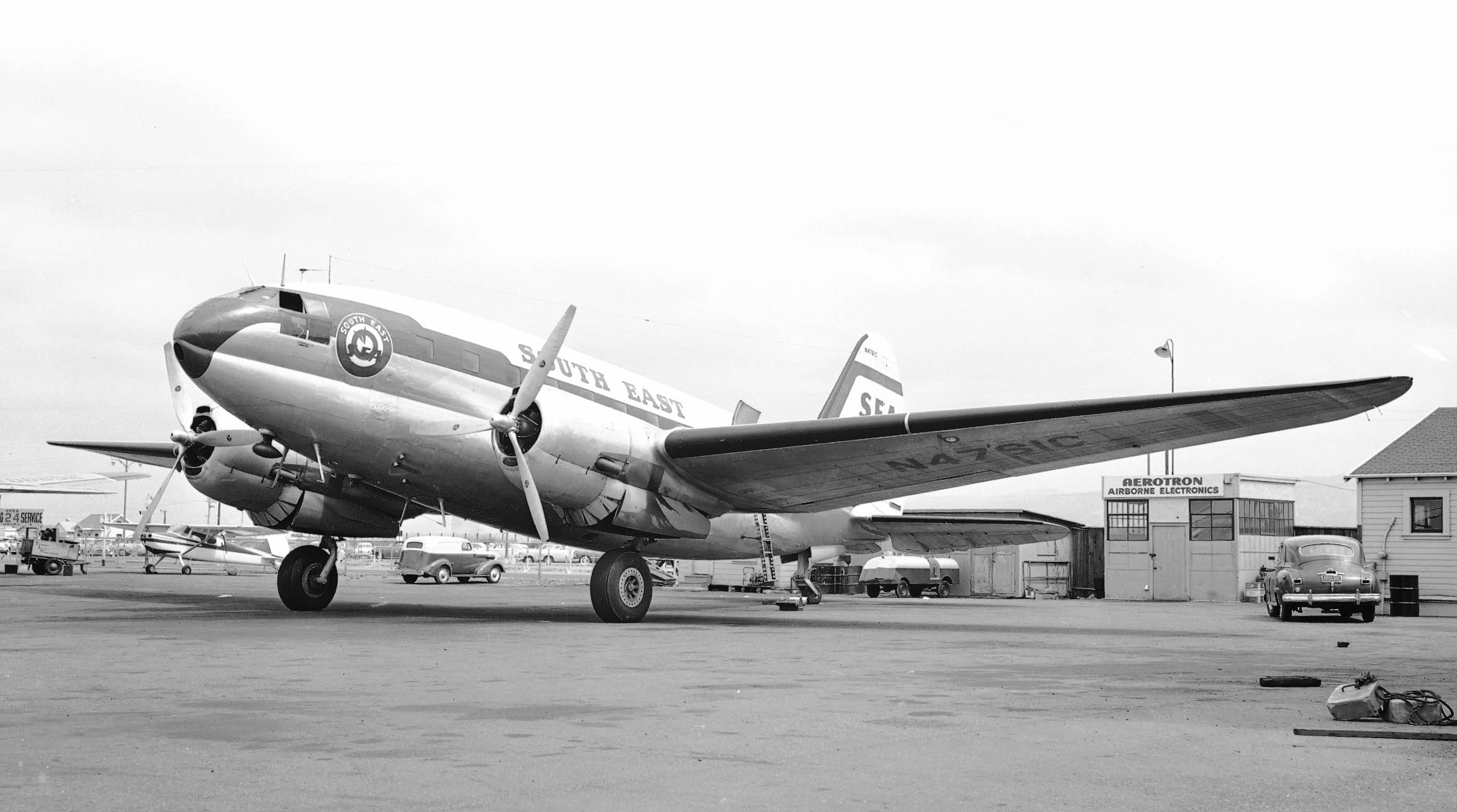
Not really an airline. Same aircraft (registration N4761C) as in prior picture. Peninsular (or its alter ego, Aero Finance) flying in the livery of "South East Airlines", the Peninsular Group combine's ticket agency

The CAB had trouble with irregularity: defining something in terms of a negative resulted in an "elusive and shifting concept." The CAB tried several times to nail it down. Even if individual carriers remained irregular (whatever that was), it was noted that a ticket agent representing many irregular carriers might cobble together effectively scheduled service on big routes. If the agent was independent, it was unclear the CAB could prevent this.

The Korean War showed once again that the irregulars could be useful; they carried over 50% of the military charter airlift. A 1949 appeals court ruling required the CAB give an irregular carrier a hearing before shutting it down, increasing the difficulty of possibly revoking dozens of carriers. In 1951, the Senate again weighed in, lambasting the CAB for oppressing the irregulars while subsidizing "high-cost luxury air service for a small part of the population." So the CAB rolled irregular carrier issues into an investigation, kicking the problem into the future, while, as discussed below, still pursuing specific offenders. When the investigation finished four years in the future (December 1955) the CAB was conciliatory. It acknowledged the contributions of the irregulars for things like coach class, Berlin and Korea. It renamed these carriers "supplemental" because it was now their role to provide supplemental capacity through unlimited domestic charters and the ability to fly up to 10 scheduled flights per month per city pair, effectively swapping "irregular" for "infrequent." It extended these rights to 49 supplementals through a new blanket exemption.

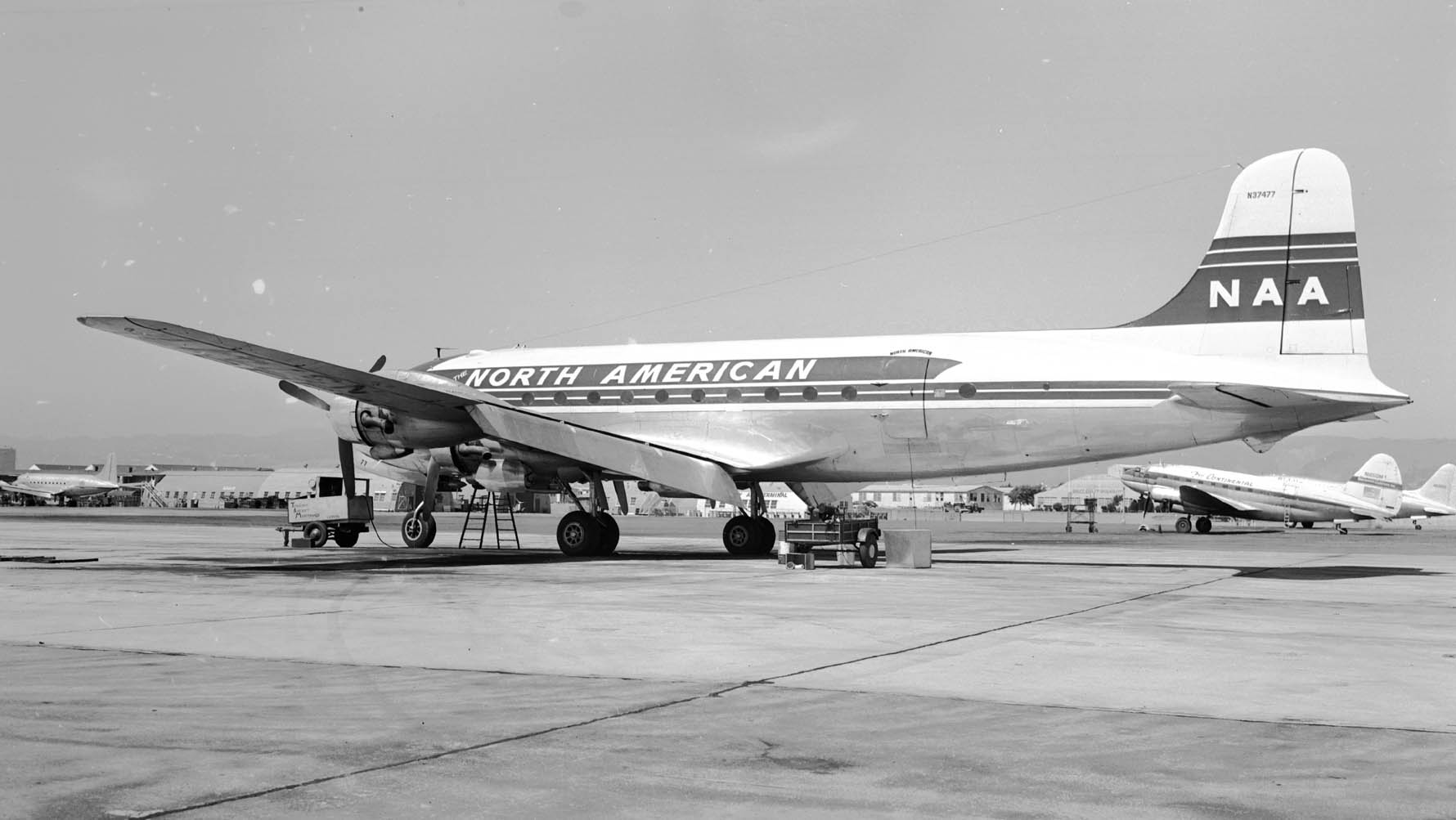
Five irregular carriers flew under the North American Airlines name, one legally named North American Airlines. The biggest of the combines shut down in 1957, after the US Supreme Court refused to hear an appeal of the CAB's 1955 shutdown order.

=== 1950s combines ===
A combine was a group of irregular carriers flying under the brand of a group-controlled ticket sales agency, often with common services (e.g. maintenance or accounting) provided by other group entities. The biggest combine was North American Airlines Group (1949–1957), where ultimately five irregular carriers flew under the "North American Airlines" name using a common pool of crews and aircraft. In the case of North American, the carriers were ostensibly independently owned and operated but in practice tightly controlled. Using multiple carriers allowed each to fly "irregularly", while together offering scheduled service. North American was effectively a rogue scheduled airline, highly profitable for its partners, who had the money to delay shutdown until 1957 through public relations, lobbying and litigation all the way to the US Supreme Court.

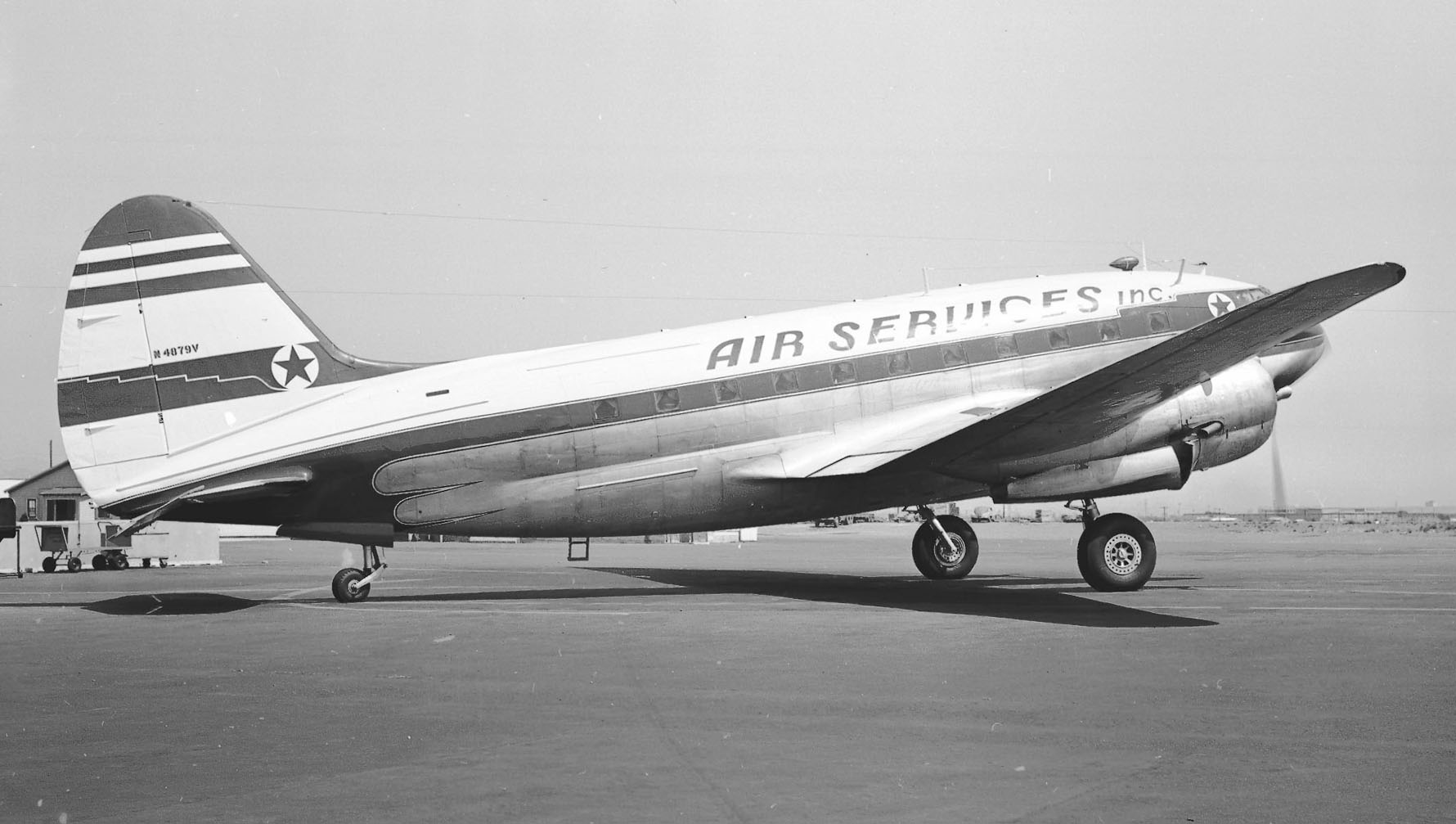
The CAB revoked Long Beach-based Air Services in March 1959 for being a North Star combine carrier. Note livery similarities between this aircraft and Air America aircraft above

The CAB pursued three other combines:

- What the CAB called the Peninsular Group, which flew in the name (and sometimes livery) of, successively, Safeway, South East Airlines, and Atlantic Aircoach. The two main group carriers were Peninsular Air Transport and Aero Finance. It was a family firm: two brothers and a cousin owned/controlled the airlines, sisters owned the agencies, a nephew helped run them, etc. The CAB shut them in 1957.
- The North Star Group, which operated under other names including Flying Irishman, in which at least five carriers played a role over time: Caribbean American, Air America, Air Services, Central Air Transport and Paul Mantz Air Services. On occasion combines swapped irregular carriers: for example, Central flew for North American before it flew for North Star and Paul Mantz would later fly for Skycoach, related below. The CAB started trying to shut down North Star in 1953.

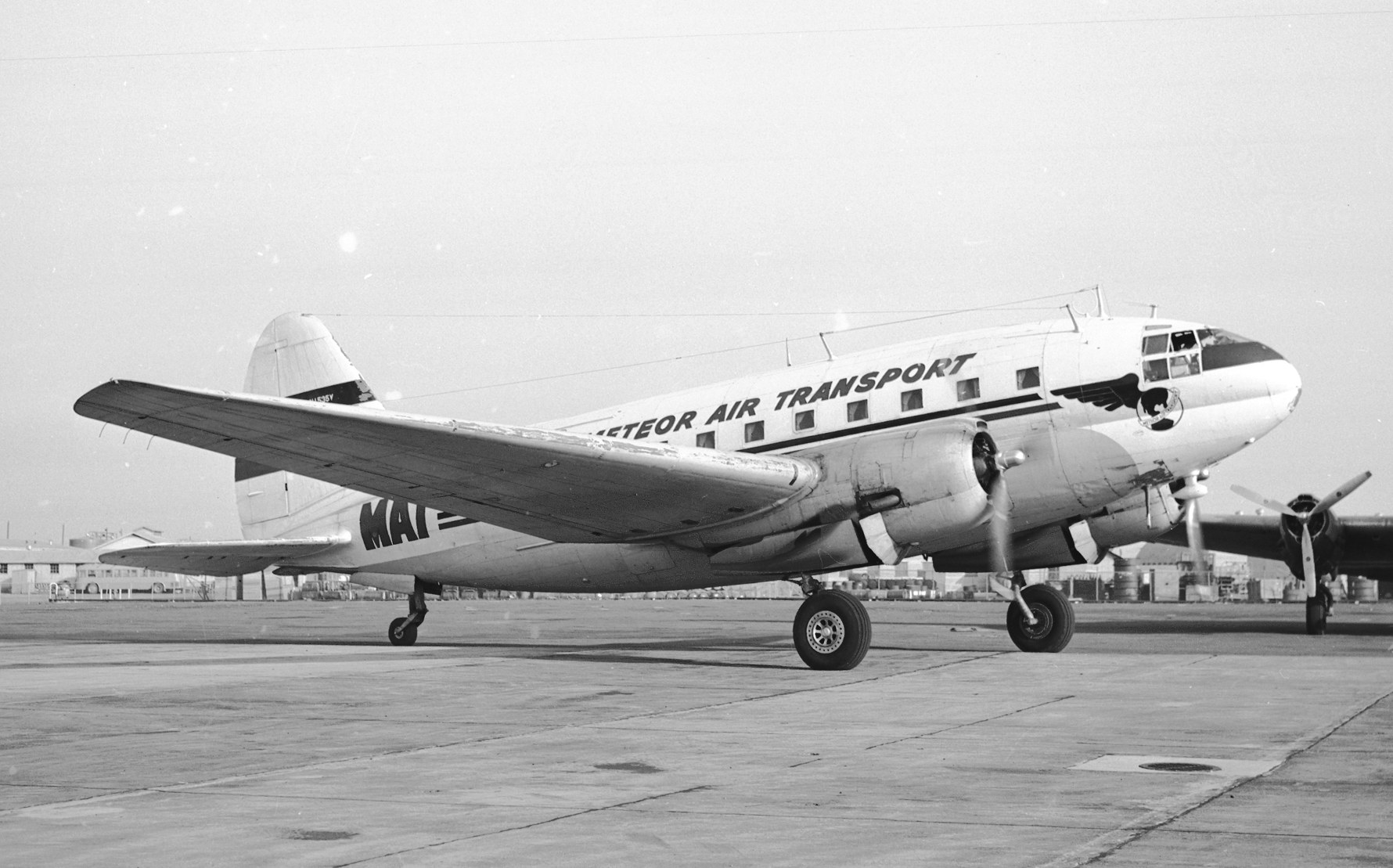
In 1953 Teterboro-based Meteor Air Transport had three C-46s and two DC-3s and was profitable with 88% of revenue military, 39% passenger. By 1957 it had DC-4s on transatlantic charters and an FBO subsidiary, but in 1958 the IRS seized its assets. In 1960, no one came to a CAB hearing to determine its future.

- The most persistent combine was Skycoach (other names it used included Transcontinental.) Skycoach started as early as 1949. Its two main carriers, Currey Air Transport and Great Lakes Airlines (no relation to the later regional airline of the same name), were shut down in late 1961 after extensive litigation including multiple federal appeals court cases and the US Supreme Court declining to take further appeals. Skycoach used Monarch Air Service, in the early-mid 1950s and the CAB also found Trans-Alaskan Airlines was under Skycoach control. In 1961, Skycoach tried yet again by reviving two moribund carriers, Quaker City Airways and Paul Mantz Air Services (which earlier flew for North Star), renaming them Admiral Airways, and Paramount Airlines respectively. But 1962 legislation (discussed below) required all supplementals be recertificated by the CAB. There were no grandfather rights so the CAB simply declined in the cases of Admiral and Paramount.

Timetables survive from each of the four combines listed above.

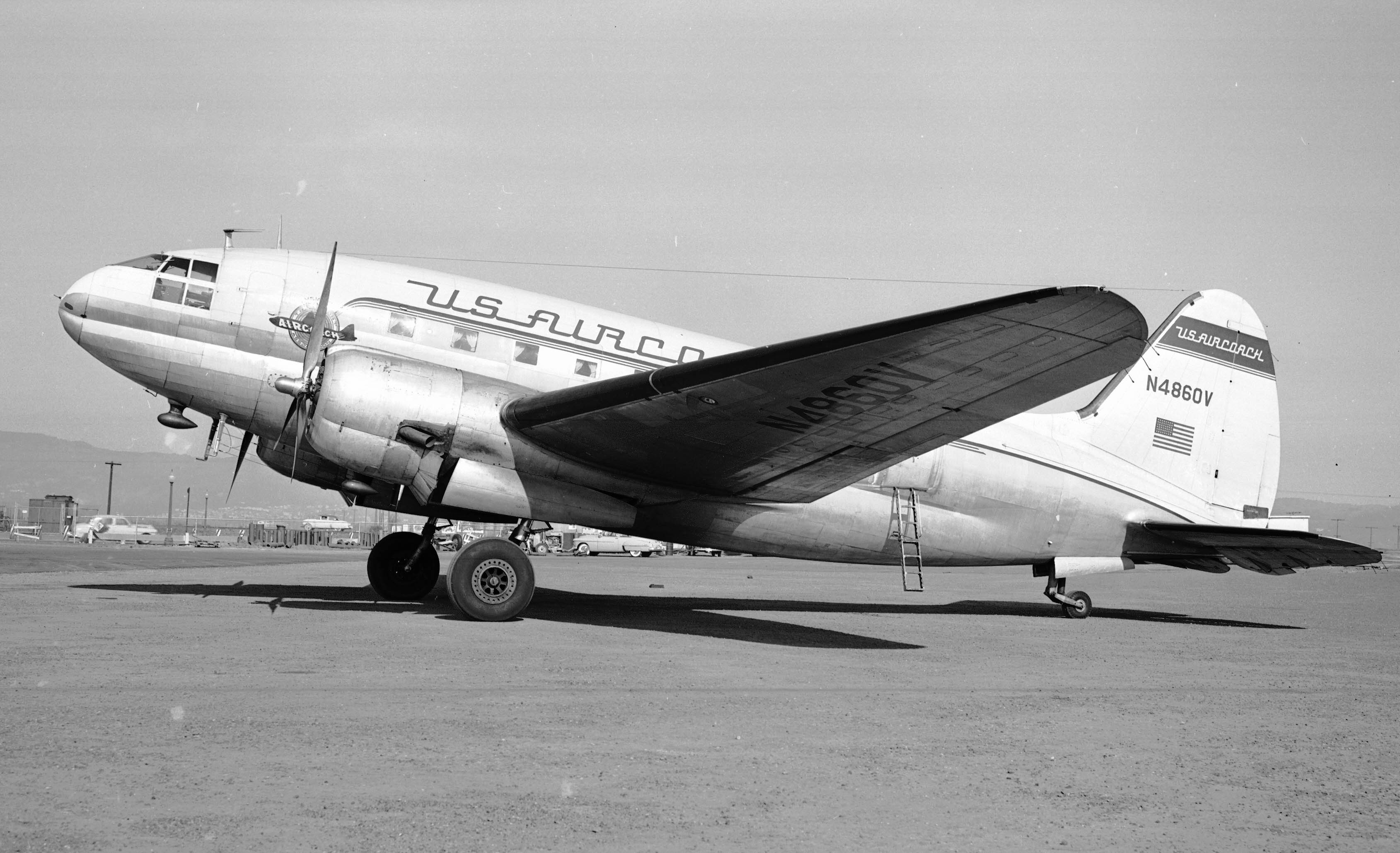
Scott Aero Services in Long Beach became U.S. Aircoach in February 1950 and a year later had five DC-4s and the CAB cited it for scheduled Hawaii flights. By 1953 it had only a DC-3 and a C-46. It did not fly 2Q1954 to 3Q1955 and again for almost a year ending Sep 1958. The CAB ended the carrier for financial weakness and lack of compliance disposition in 1959

=== 1953 snapshot ===
Table 1: 1953 Irregular Air Carrier Revenues(1) Seaboard & Western, Transocean, Overseas National and United States Overseas Airlines(2) In 1953: Hemisphere, Trans American, Trans National, Twentieth Century and Unit Export(3) In 1953: Currey Air Transport, Great Lakes Airlines and Monarch Air Services(4) In 1953: Caribbean American, Air America, Air Services, Central Air Transport and Paul Mantz Air Services(5) In 1953: Aero Finance and Peninsular Air Transport
USD 000	Military charter	Civil charter	Scheduled	Other	Total
Big four^{(1)}	22,442	4,217	3,718	433	30,810
Combines:					
North American^{(2)}	423	0	9,268	785	10,476
Skycoach^{(3)}	634	128	2,743	145	3,650
North Star^{(4)}	196	213	2,173	220	2,802
Peninsular Group^{(5)}	555	137	1,522	7	2,221
Total combine	1,808	478	15,706	1,157	19,149
37 other carriers	10,837	1,769	4,716	2,747	20,069
Total	35,087	6,464	24,140	4,337	70,028

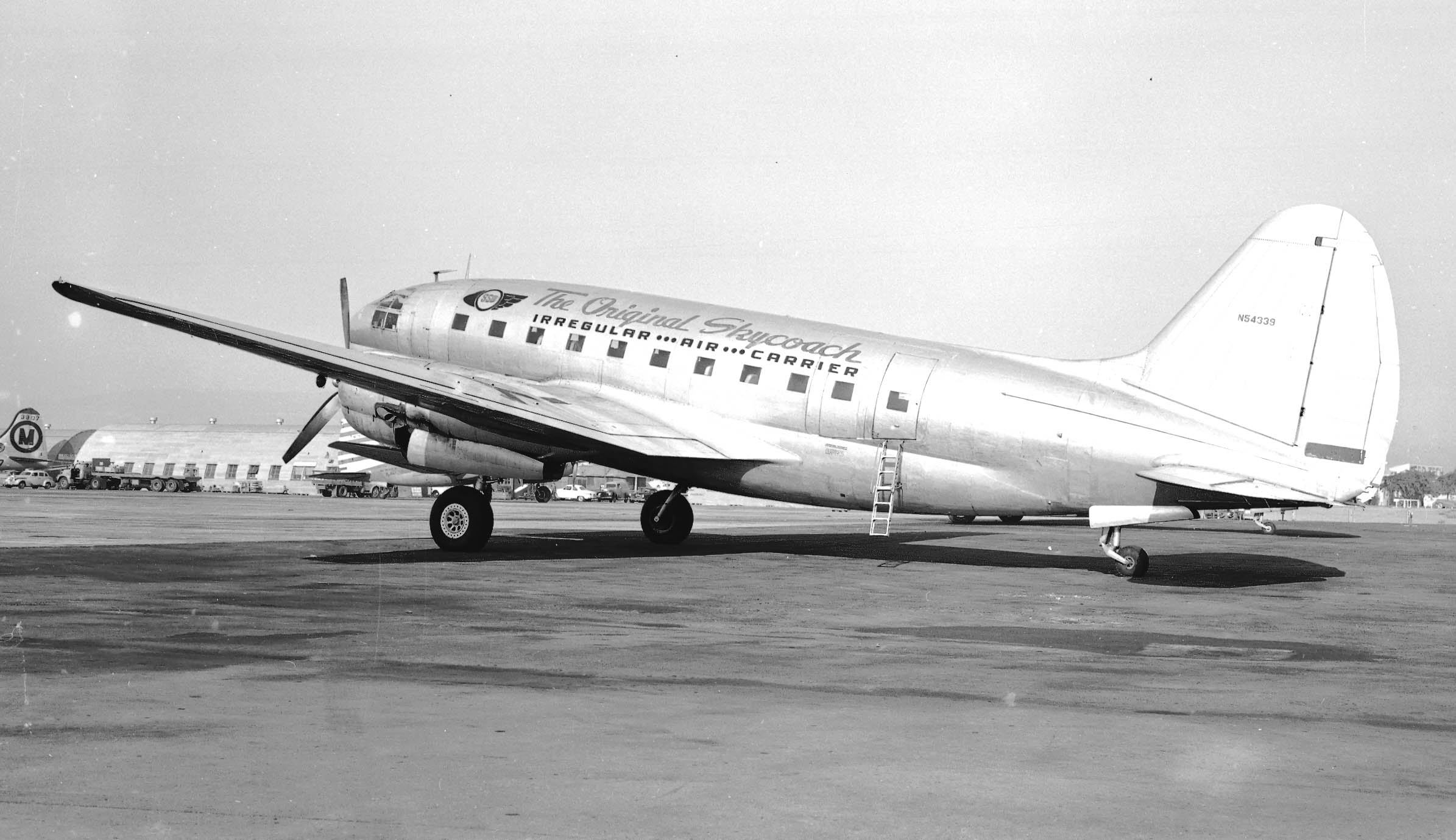
In 1953, Burbank (initially El Paso)-based S.S.W., Inc., had a single C-46 with 60% military revenues and lower-than-breakeven results. From September 1957 it was dba Universal Airlines, no relation to later Universal Airlines of Ypsilanti. CAB suspended its license in September 1959 after stranding passengers because it could not afford to fix its DC-6. Finally lost its license in 1960

In 1953, total irregular airline operating revenue was $70 million ($825 million in 2024 dollar terms). 55 irregular carriers reported non-zero revenue but one, Seaboard & Western, accounted for almost 20% of total irregular carrier revenue. By comparison, the total US certificated (scheduled) carrier industry operating revenue was $1.317 billion, so irregular carrier revenue accounted for 5% of the joint certificated/irregular total. Included in that $1.317 billion was $13.5 million in scheduled airline charter revenue, little more than 1%. A breakdown of irregular airline revenue is shown in Table 1. Note:

- The irregulars had a significant scheduled business. These figures understate how large that was relative to what scheduled airlines would report because irregular carriers paid much larger commissions, as much as 45%, while scheduled carriers paid only 5%. Pre-commission gross revenues (what consumers paid) were thus much greater per dollar of reported revenue for irregular carriers than for scheduled. Either way, however, irregular carrier scheduled business was small relative to the $1.044 billion that certificated carriers reported in scheduled flight revenue that year.
- The combines together accounted for 65% of the irregular scheduled business, while North American alone accounted for 38% of irregular carrier scheduled revenue and 15% of total irregular carrier revenue.
- Seaboard & Western, Transocean, Overseas National Airways (ONA) and United States Overseas Airlines (USOA) accounted for almost 2/3 of the irregular military charter business.

=== 1955–1962: legal crisis ===
Certificated carrier reaction to the CAB's 1955 creation of supplemental carriers, specifically the leeway to fly 10 flights/month on any given route, was "violent," according to Aviation Week. They sued to overturn it and were partially successful. The CAB had continued to permit the operation of supplementals through its power of exemption. But that power required the CAB to show that certificating the supplementals would be an undue burden on these carriers, and the CAB had not done that. So in January 1959 the CAB certificated the supplementals. Of 49 exempted in 1955, only 23 survived the 1959 certification process (with a further two to be decided), although appeals and litigation delayed the end of many carriers the CAB deemed unacceptable.

That certification was overturned April 1960:

- The CAB could not legally regulate frequency. So the limit of 10 frequencies per route per month was illegal.
- Certificates were legally required to specify end and intermediate points of routes. Making endpoints any two cities in the country (as it effectively was for supplementals) frustrated the clear intent of the legislation.

Congress intervened with an interim bill allowing the status quo while it considered a solution. Senate and House split; the House wanted to limit the supplementals to charters, the Senate to let them keep limited scheduled authority. In November 1961, a notorious crash (discussed further below) by a financially-shaky supplemental, Imperial Airlines, swung momentum towards the House, and in July 1962, Public Law 87-528 turned supplementals into pure charter carriers after a two-year transition. The law required supplementals to go through another certification, at the end of which, in 1966, only 13 were left. The bill also allowed scheduled cargo airlines to also offer passenger charters, increasing competition for the supplementals.

=== 1960 military charter changes ===
Graph 3: The US military was the dominant source of revenue for irregular/ supplemental airlines during the 1950s, if not always a majority. Note the relatively small contribution from civilian charters

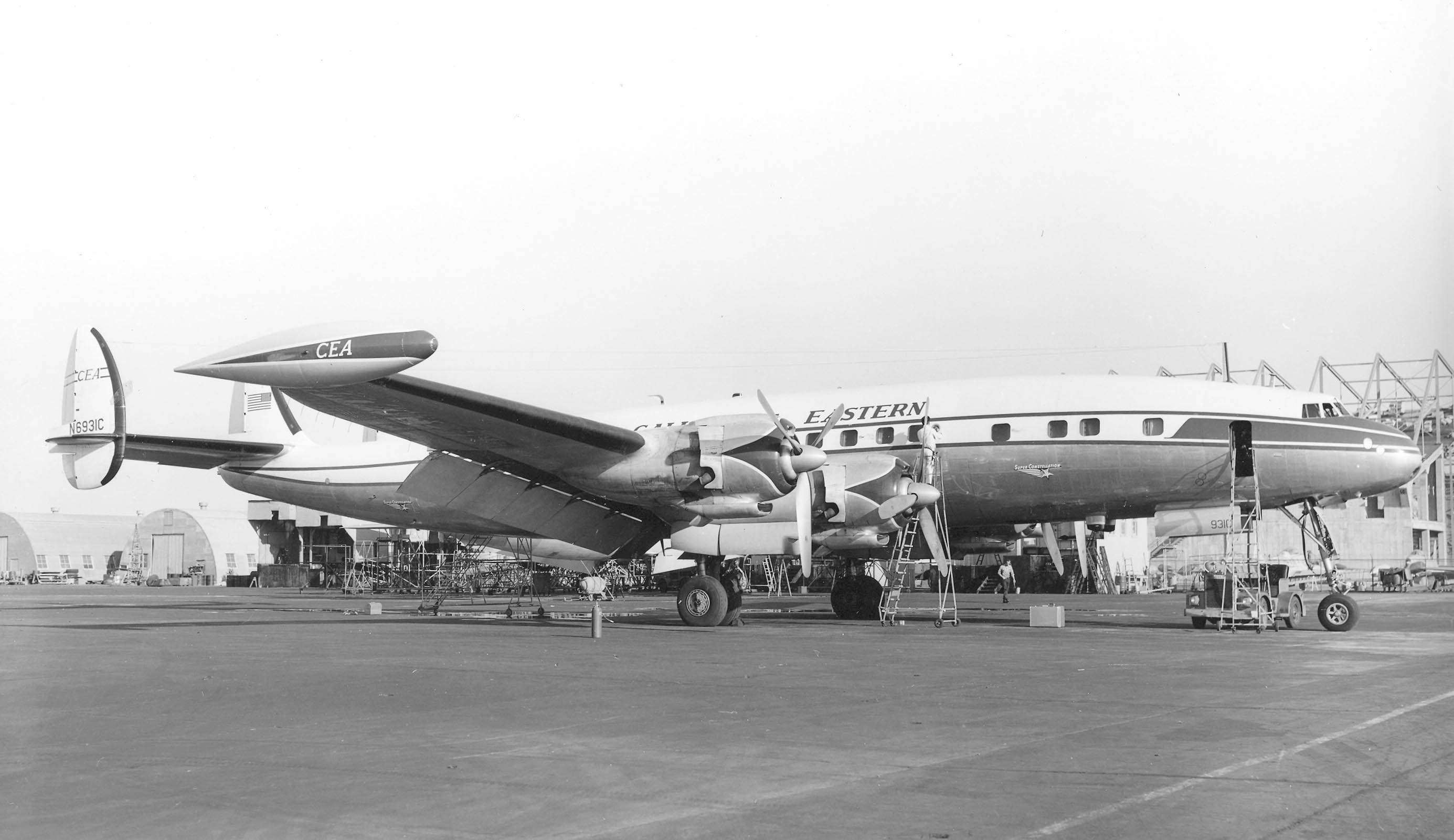
California Eastern Airways (CEA) went bankrupt in 1948, emerging as an uncertificated carrier for the military. The CAB recertificated CEA as a supplemental in 1959, only for CEA to sell its certificate to President Airlines in 1960 to focus elsewhere, eventually becoming a major government contractor.

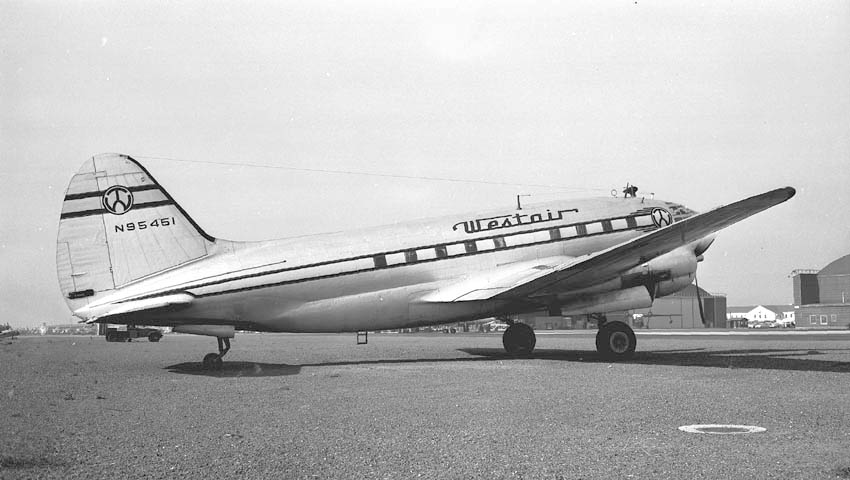
The CAB suspended Aviation Corp. of Seattle dba Westair Transport for 13 months for violations contributing to 28 deaths in a June 1950 ditching, that occurred months after the Civil Aeronautics Administration asked the CAB to suspend Westair. On suspension, Westair operated illegally for Flying Tiger Line. In 1959 the CAB approved the same management for a supplemental certificate. The IRS seized its assets January 1960

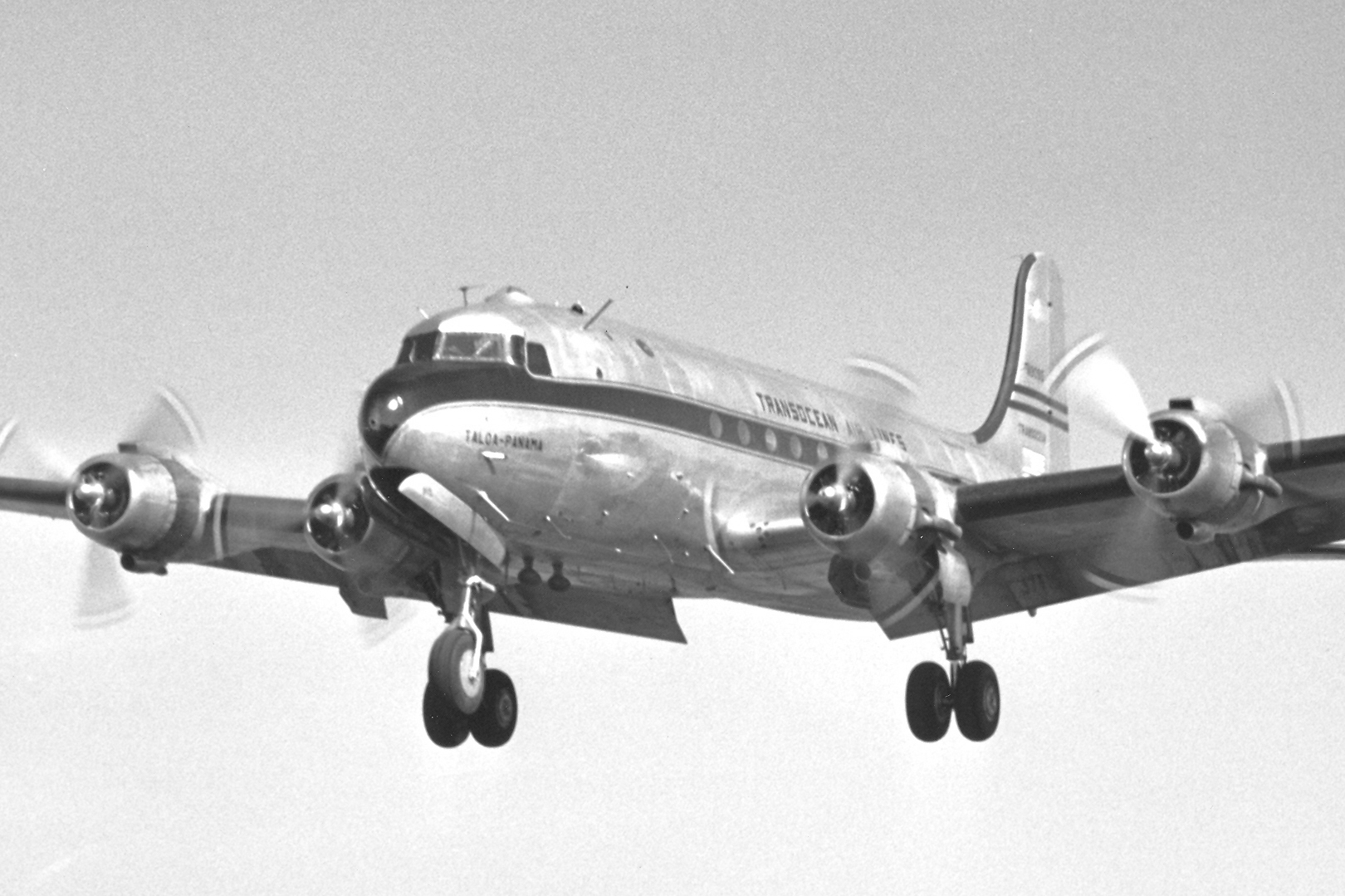
Transocean Air Lines was one of the most capable nonskeds, with global operations. Its aircraft featured in the 1954 Hollywood film The High and the Mighty, based on a novel by Ernest K. Gann, who flew for Transocean. The carrier collapsed in early 1960

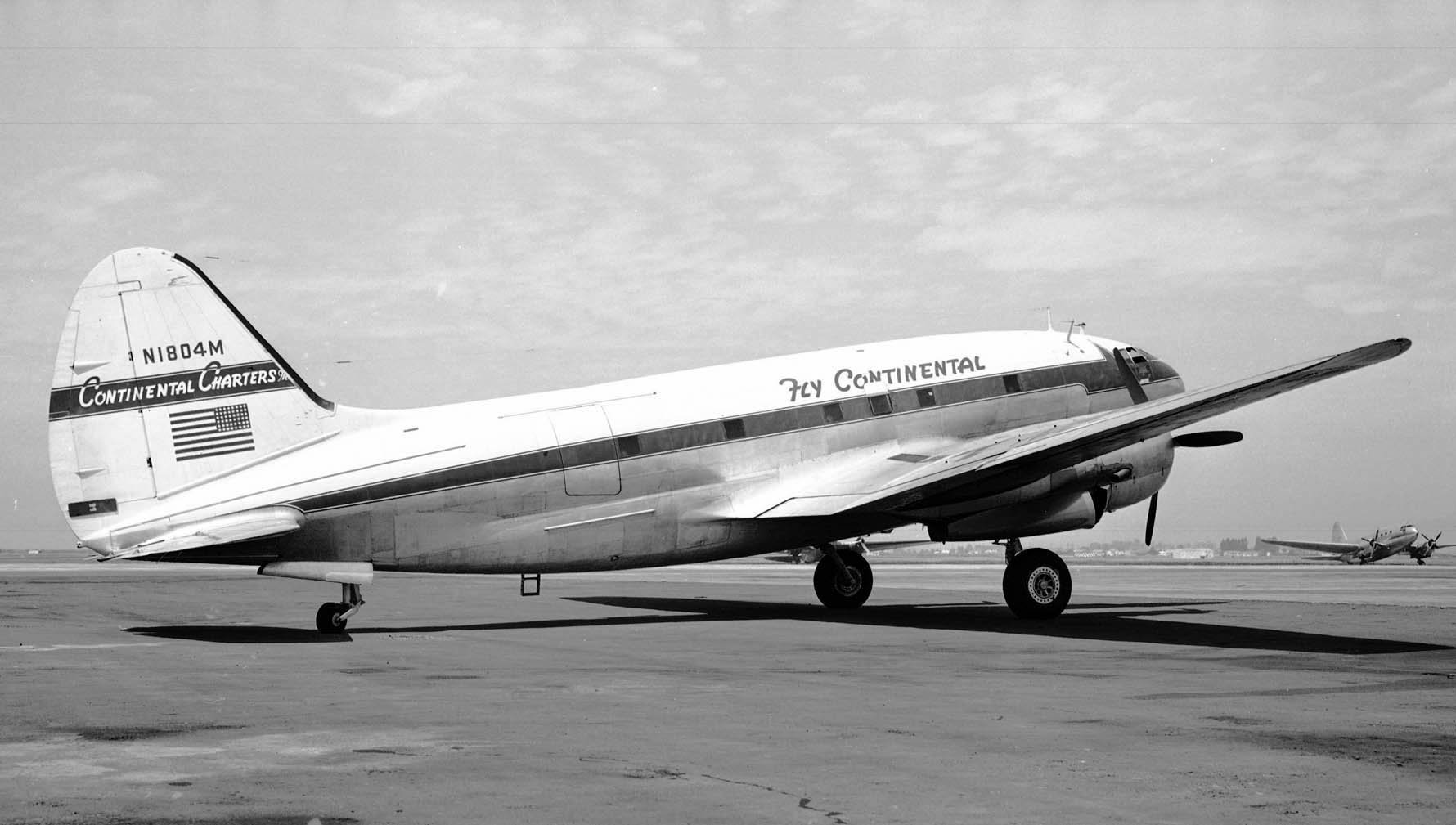
Unpaid taxes forced Miami-based Continental Charters (no relation to Continental Air Lines) into bankruptcy in 1954. New owners bought it for literally $20, the CAB refused to allow them to operate, but by piggy-backing on litigation the moribund carrier was able to stave off the final end until March 1961

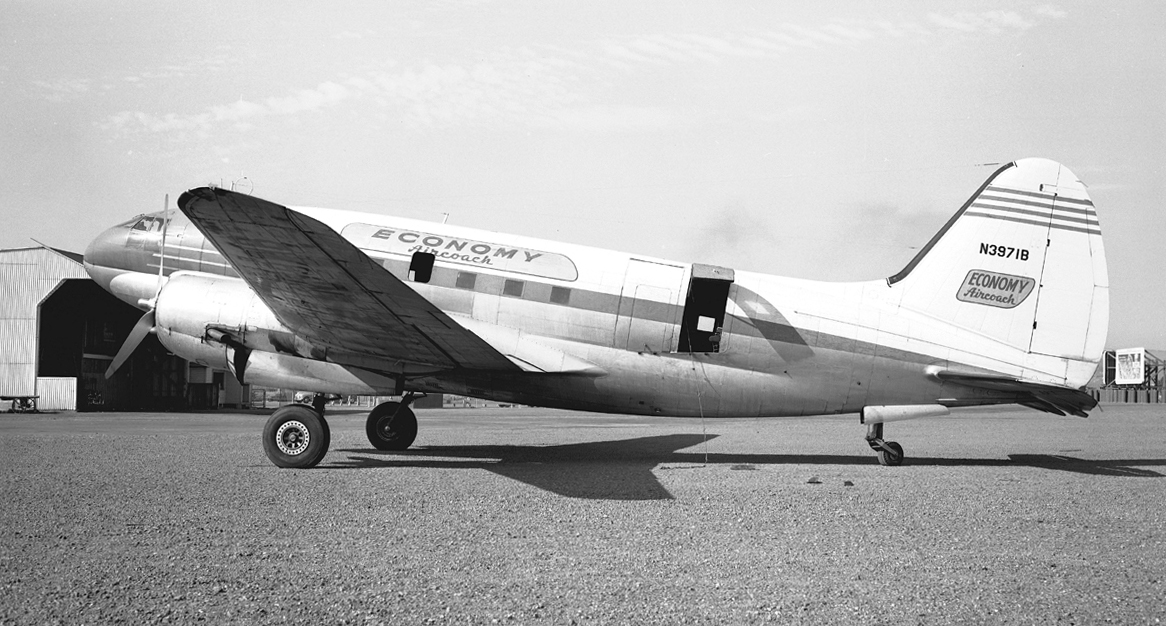
In 1950 the CAB curbed New York-based Economy Airways from scheduled service to New Orleans & Houston, by 1953 it had four C-46s but a significantly negative net worth. By 1956, the CAB suspended its operating authority, with full revocation in 1961

As Graph 3 shows, the military was the largest revenue source for 1950s supplementals. For example, in 1956, ten supplementals supported DEW Line construction in the arctic. Prior to 1960, the military awarded charter contracts by competitive bid and accepted bids from Part 45 carriers, airlines not subject to CAB regulation because they were not common carriers. Part 45s could undercut CAB carriers so the CAB was forced to allow its carriers to also bid, making military charters a rare competitive free-for-all in a system that otherwise suppressed competition. For instance, in 1959, the Military Air Transportation Service (MATS), the governing military agency, invited 93 airlines to bid for contracts. In the same year, Overseas National Airways won over half the international military contract dollars for 1960, stripping Pan Am and Trans World Airlines (TWA) of their contracts.

MATS ran its own scheduled flights with military transports. The airlines, and others, believed the military should not provide routine air transport. In February 1960, the US Department of Defense (DOD) published a report endorsed by President Eisenhower: MATS was to reduce flights in favor of airlines and only "air carriers" per the 1958 Federal Aviation Act were to fly military charters. This was the definition of a CAB-regulated air carrier, so it excluded Part 45s. Further, contracts were to go to carriers with militarily useful aircraft. The aim was to renew the country's commercial cargo fleet, viewed as dangerously inadequate. With Part 45s excuded, the CAB ended competitive bidding and set uniform military charter rates at significantly higher levels, in particular, ones profitable for scheduled carriers.

With price no longer a factor, DOD allocated contracts by an airline's participation in the Civil Reserve Air Fleet (CRAF), a pool of airliners the military can tap in emergency. The military assigned "mobilization values" to aircraft in CRAF based on speed (favoring jets), capacity, utility and range. DOD liked long-range convertible jets that could carry passengers or cargo. The highest-rated narrowbody was a "stretch" convertible DC-8-63CF, which had a higher rating than a passenger 747. By the late 1960s/early 1970s, seven supplementals flew the DC-8-63CF or the closely related DC-8-61CF: American Flyers, Capitol, ONA, Saturn, Trans International, Universal and World. Standard Airways cited lack of convertible jets and resulting inability to get much military business as a factor in its 1969 collapse. Of course, in 1960, no supplemental flew jets. In fact, even in 1964, the supplementals still had only six long-range jets between them, against 427 for scheduled carriers, giving them a huge edge.

=== 1961 Imperial Airlines crash ===
In November 1961, supplemental Imperial Airlines crashed a Lockheed Constellation, killing all 74 soldiers aboard. The investigation showed the crew was incompetent and put the safety record of the supplementals in the spotlight, revealing it to be 30 times worse than that of scheduled carriers. DOD came under pressure to tighten standards, and launched its own airline inspections. Some supplementals that failed inspections were small, like Airline Transport Carriers (dba California Hawaiian), but among those that failed was also United States Overseas Airlines (USOA), one of the largest supplementals. This contributed significantly to USOA's 1964 demise. And a 1963 non-fatal crash at Standard Airways surfaced maintenance issues leading DOD to crack down, contributing to 1964 bankruptcy.

=== 1965 vs 1955: mortality, new leaders, substantial profitability for some ===
CAB enforcement actions against combines, the impact of new military charter allocation rules, the DOD's crackdown after the 1961 Imperial Airlines crash and the shifting legal status of supplementals, including recertifications, all contributed to a big reduction in the ranks of supplementals from 49 in 1955 to 13 by the end of 1965, this number also reflecting the November 1965 merger of AAXICO Airlines into Saturn Airways (known as All-American Airways in 1955). These 13 were not all in good health: the future of three was in doubt, with operations suspended or only recently resumed. At year end 1965, only 11 supplementals were operating but this returned to 13 at the end of 1966. The 1965 lead carriers by revenue were also completely different from those of 1955. Of the top five supplementals in 1955, one (Seaboard & Western) became a scheduled cargo carrier while the other four were out of business by 1965. In 1965 the three largest supplementals were World Airways, Zantop Air Transport and Trans International Airlines (TIA). In 1955, Los Angeles Air Service (the original name of TIA) had the 18th and World Airways the 19th largest revenues. Zantop wasn't even a supplemental in 1955, but became one in 1962 by merging with moribund supplemental Coastal Air Lines, known as Coastal Cargo Company in 1955. Zantop was previously a Part 45 carrier.

Supplemental air carriers of year-end 1965:

- American Flyers Airline
- Capitol Airways
- Johnson Flying Service
- Modern Air Transport
- Overseas National Airways
- Purdue Aeronautics Corporation
- Saturn Airways
- Southern Air Transport
- Standard Airways
- Trans International Airlines
- Vance International Airways
- World Airways
- Zantop Air Transport

The 13 supplementals of 1965 included two new entrants, Vance International Airways and Purdue Aeronautics Corporation, (a Purdue University subsidiary), certificated in 1960 and 1961 respectively. Another exit from 1955 ranks was Trans Caribbean, which became a scheduled passenger airline in 1957. See below for supplemental New entrants and Graduates during the CAB era.

TIA and World leveraged the new military charter rules. As previously noted, awards depended on the number and quality of aircraft committed to CRAF, especially jets. In 1962, TIA was the first supplemental to operate jets and World followed in 1963. Jets gave them priority access to Vietnam-generated (see next section) military business. Even before World had jets, it made a substantial commitment to CRAF, helping to secure military business. The CAB set military rates so even high-cost scheduled carriers could make money. Supplemental costs were far lower, so World and TIA made high military charter profits. For example, from 1965 to 1966, World's revenues increased from $33 to $50 million (military accounting for 78% and 75% of charter revenue respectively). Its 1965 operating margin was 36%, dropping slightly to 33% in 1966. World went public in 1966, owner Ed Daly's remaining 80% stake was worth $280 million (over $2.7 billion in 2024 dollars), a high return on the $50,000 he spent to buy World in 1950. Not all supplementals were so lucky. In 1966, four of 13 supplementals made a loss and two broke even.

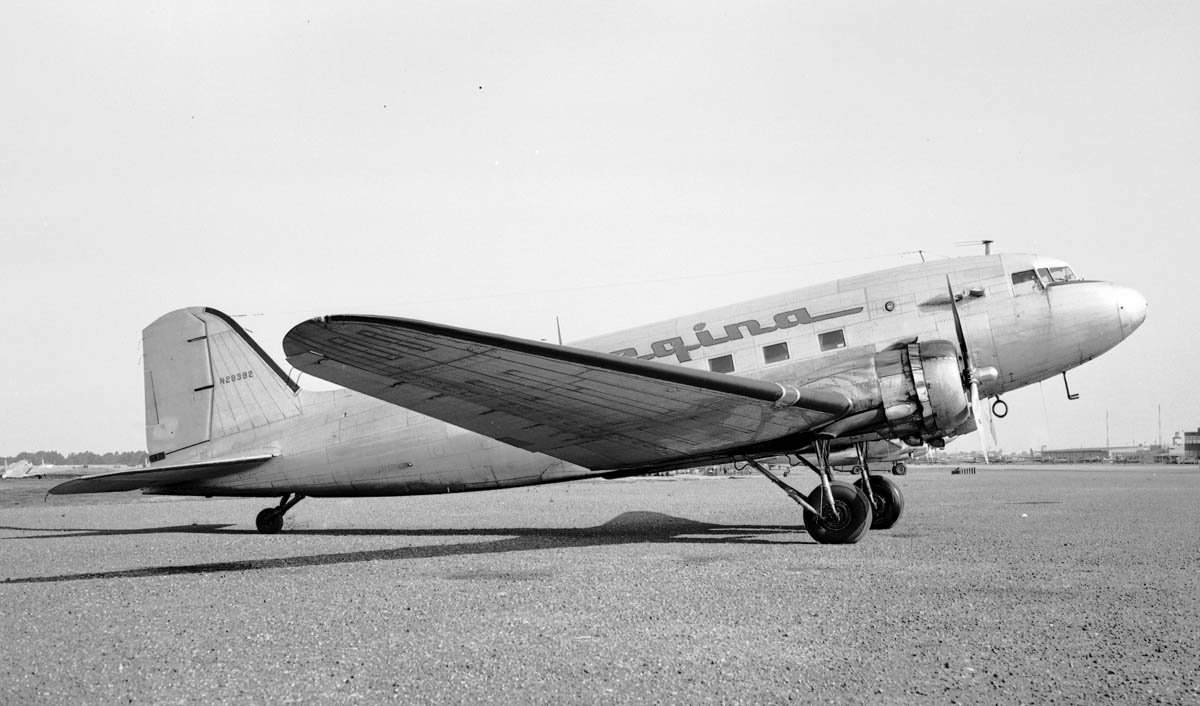
A 1950 crash (1 dead) forced a change in Regina Cargo Airlines ownership, moving it from Teterboro to Miami. It crashed again in 1953 (21 dead). Regina had Peninsular Group combine links. Its new owner at first hid his ownership from the CAB, but it did not seem to mind. In 1960 Regina became Imperial Airlines. A 1961 crash (77 dead) ended Imperial and changed the supplemental business

Some big names failed between 1955 and 1965. Transocean stopped operating early 1960 after years of high losses. As previously related, USOA failed a military inspection in the wake of the Imperial Airlines crash. Its finances deteriorated and the CAB shut it in 1964 after it failed to pay employees. Overseas National Airways entered bankruptcy in 1963 but was revived as effectively a new company by an investor group at the end of 1965, with jets in service by summer 1966. Capitol Airways was one supplemental near the top of the industry at both ends of the 1955–1965 period. From 1956 to 1960 it was one of the top four supplementals by revenue. In 1965, Capitol was still number four, having put its first jet in service in 1963.

=== 1960s Vietnam bubble ===
Graph 4: Driven by the Vietnam War, the US military spent $575 million in Fiscal 1967 (over $5.4 billion in 2024 terms) on international charters, but the vast majority went to scheduled carriers rather than supplementals

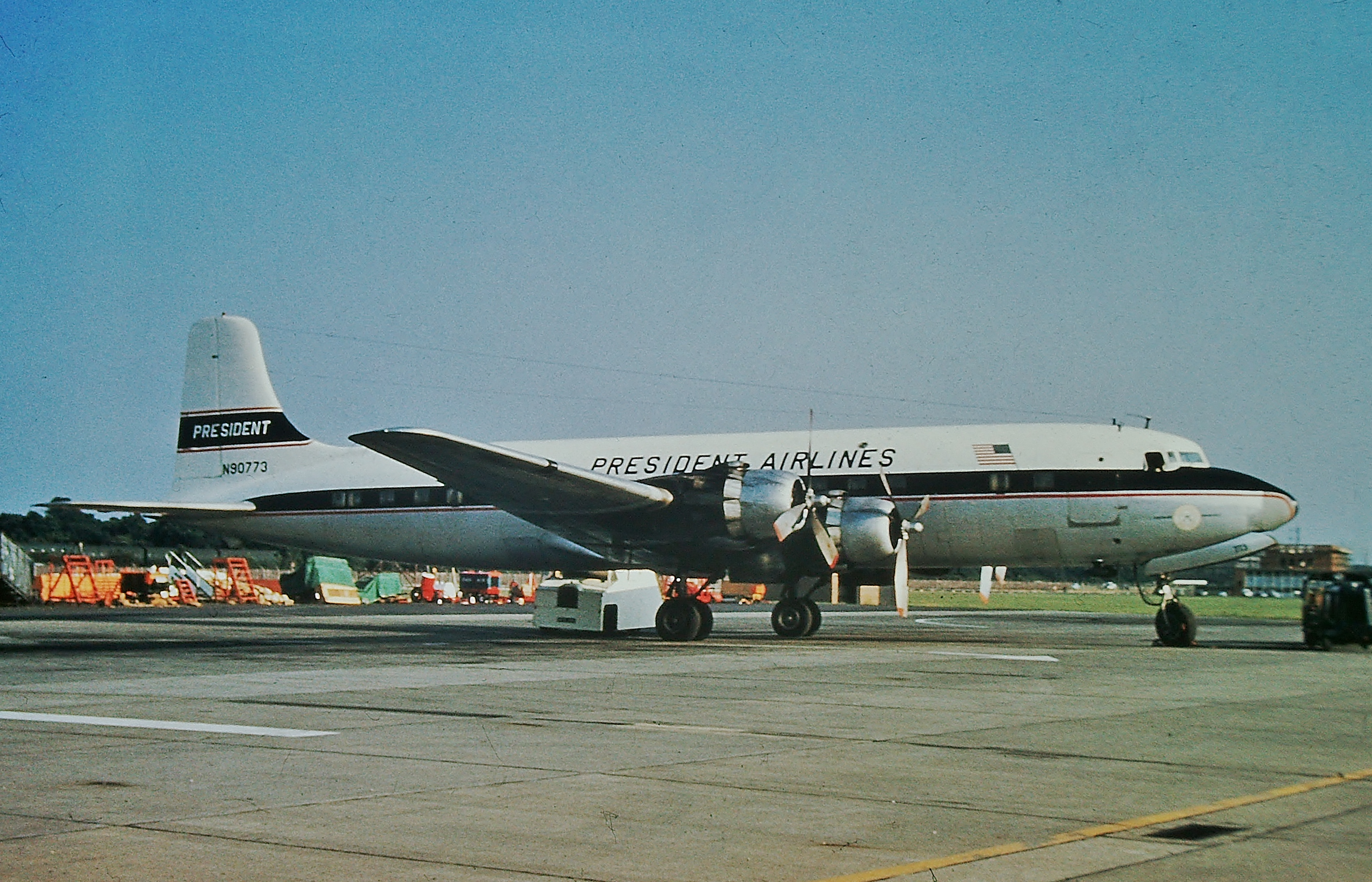
Insurance-company backed President Airlines bought the California Eastern certificate in 1960. In September 1961 the above aircraft crashed in Shannon, Ireland killing 83, and later President stranded passengers in Ireland and London. It turned out President had a new owner, a property developer/preacher with "grandiose" plans (as the press put it) to buy 34 Boeing Stratocruisers. CAB records show minimal operations in 1962 and its certificate was cancelled in August

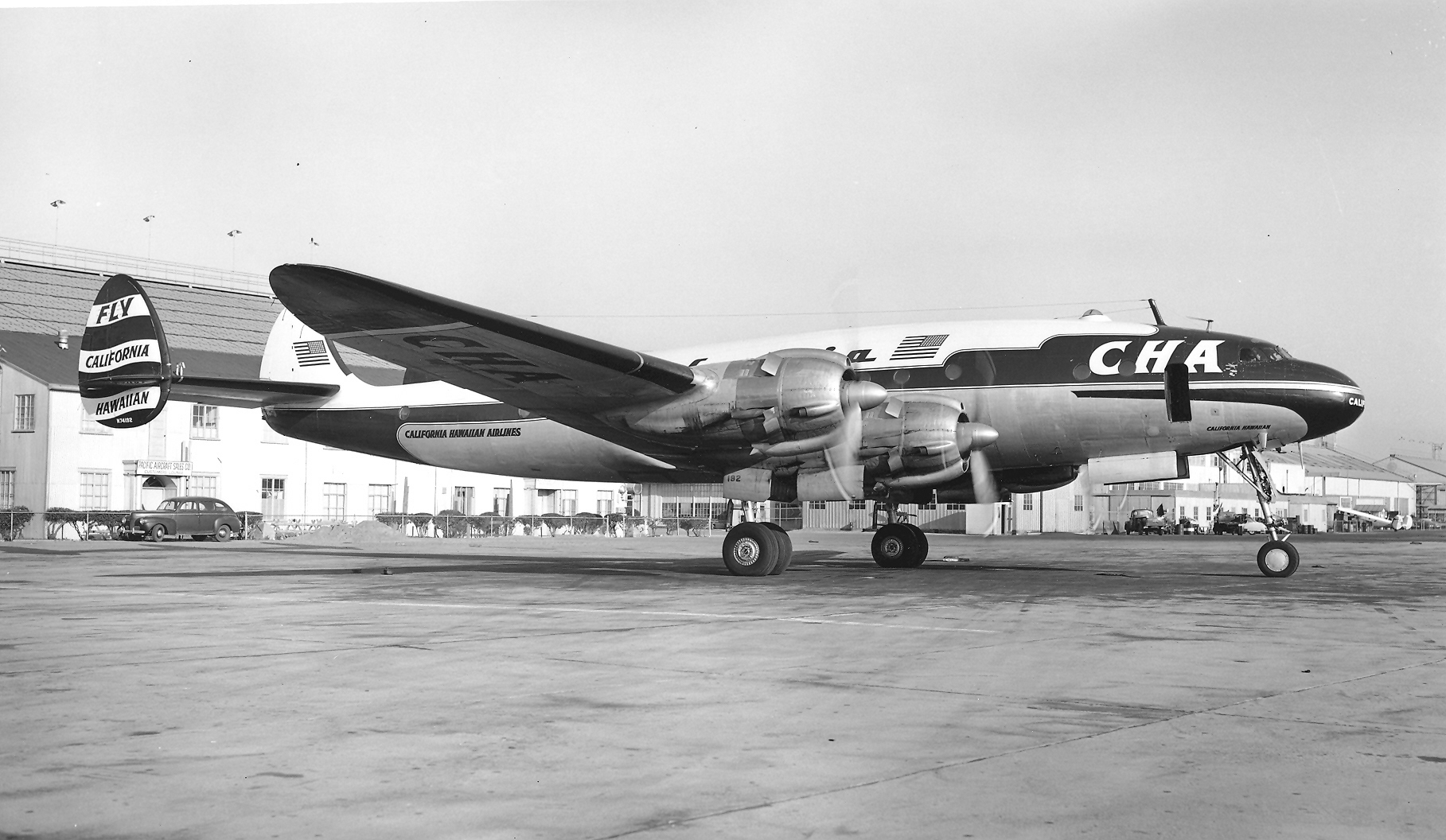
California Hawaiian Airlines (CHA) was a dba of Airline Transport Carriers (ATC), which tried Los Angeles-New York before founding California Central Airlines (CCA), a pioneering intrastate airline (1949–1955). In 1952 ATC started CHA, which survived 1954 ATC bankruptcy (CCA did not). The CAB shut ATC in 1962 after the military deemed it unsafe

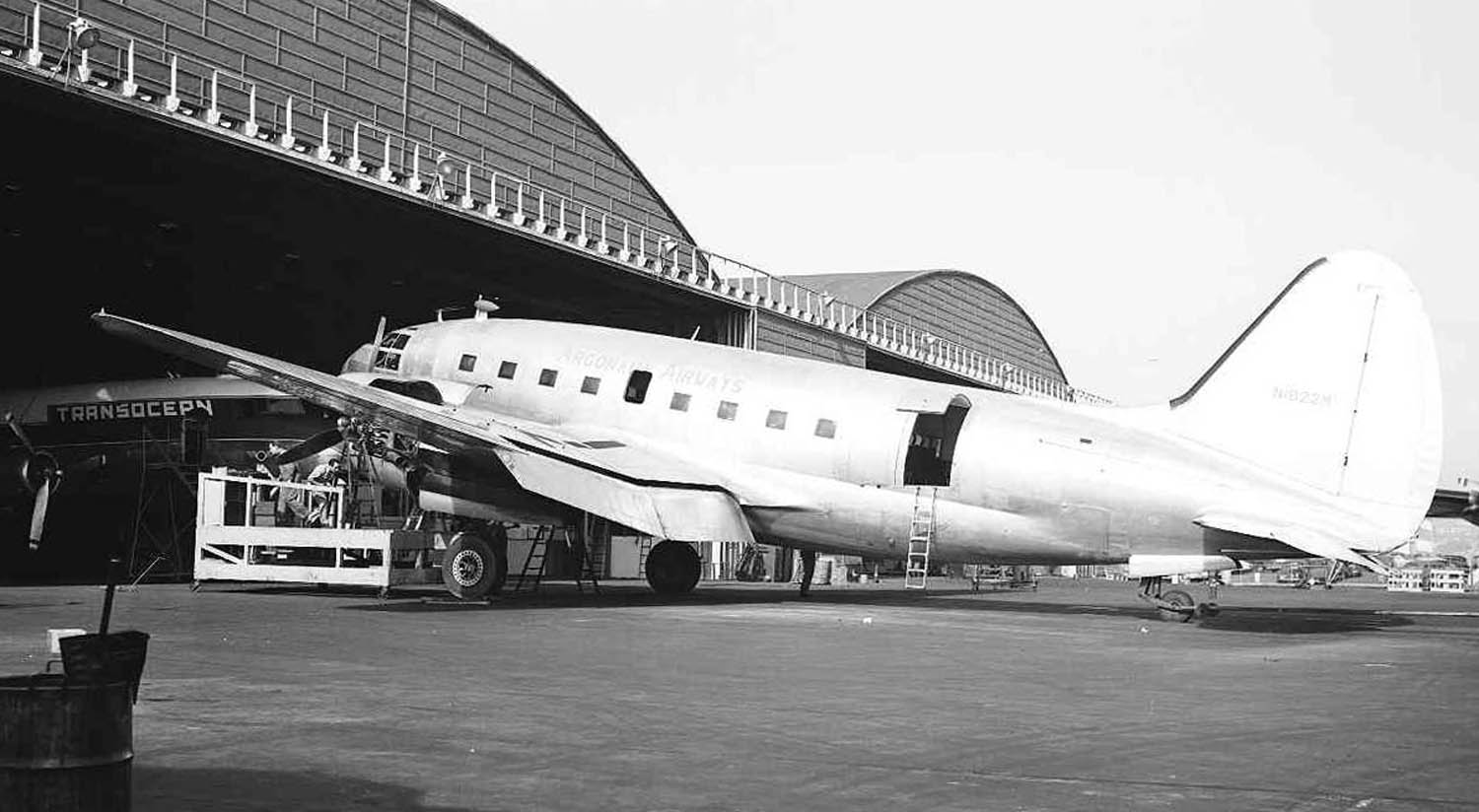
Miami-based cargo-line Argonaut Airways's owner died in a 1958 plane crash. The CAB's positive view of Argonaut had depended on his ability to cover its significant negative net worth. Argonaut voluntarily gave up operating authority in 1962.

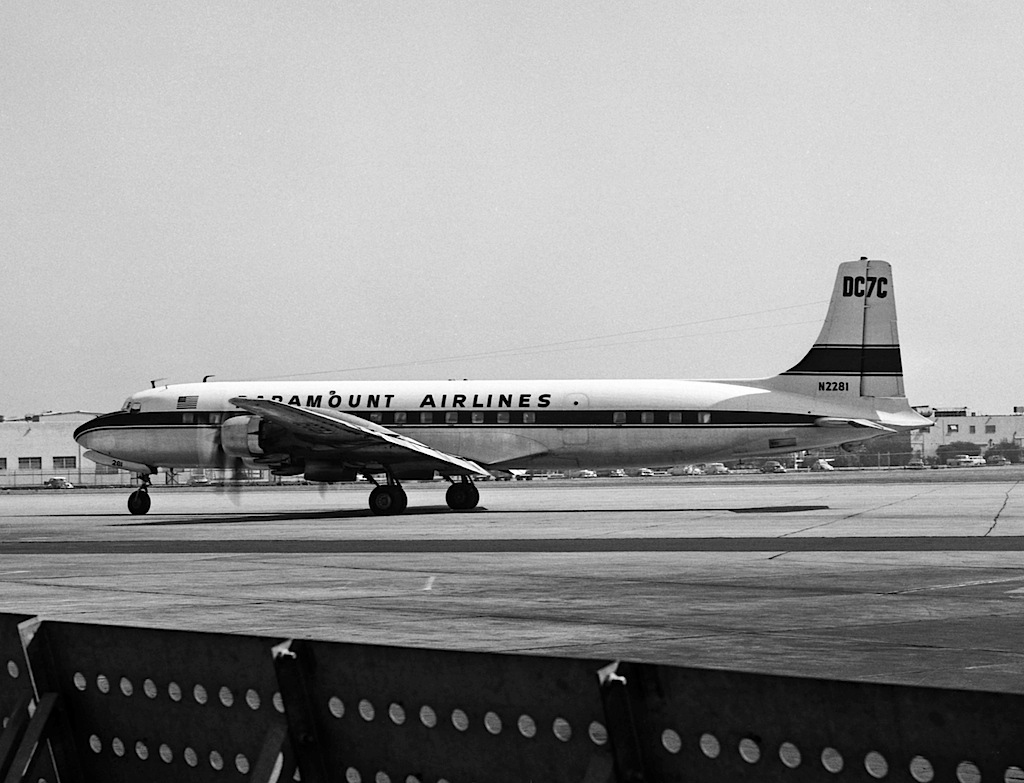
Paul Mantz was a race and Hollywood stunt pilot. His airline, Paul Mantz Air Services, worked for the North Star combine in 1953, but the CAB let him to keep his operating authority. New owners renamed it Paramount Airlines in 1961 and started flying for the Skycoach combine. The CAB used a new law to shut it in 1962.

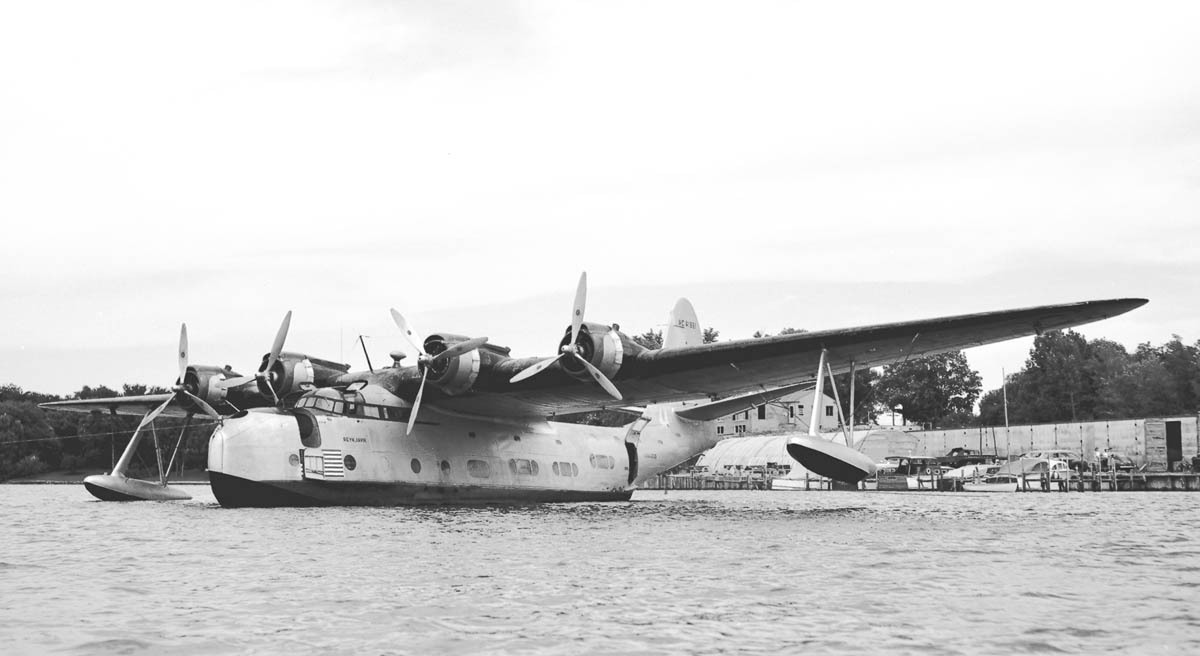
Associated Air Transport’s first aircraft was a VS-44 flying boat. Record-setting pilot Charles F. Blair Jr. started AAT in his spare time (after having helped establish (United States Overseas Airlines); until 1950 it flew a single C-46. After several management changes, AAT got caught in the 1961/1962 military crackdown on supplemental carriers – it had several recent non-fatal crashes involving soldiers, so was an obvious target.

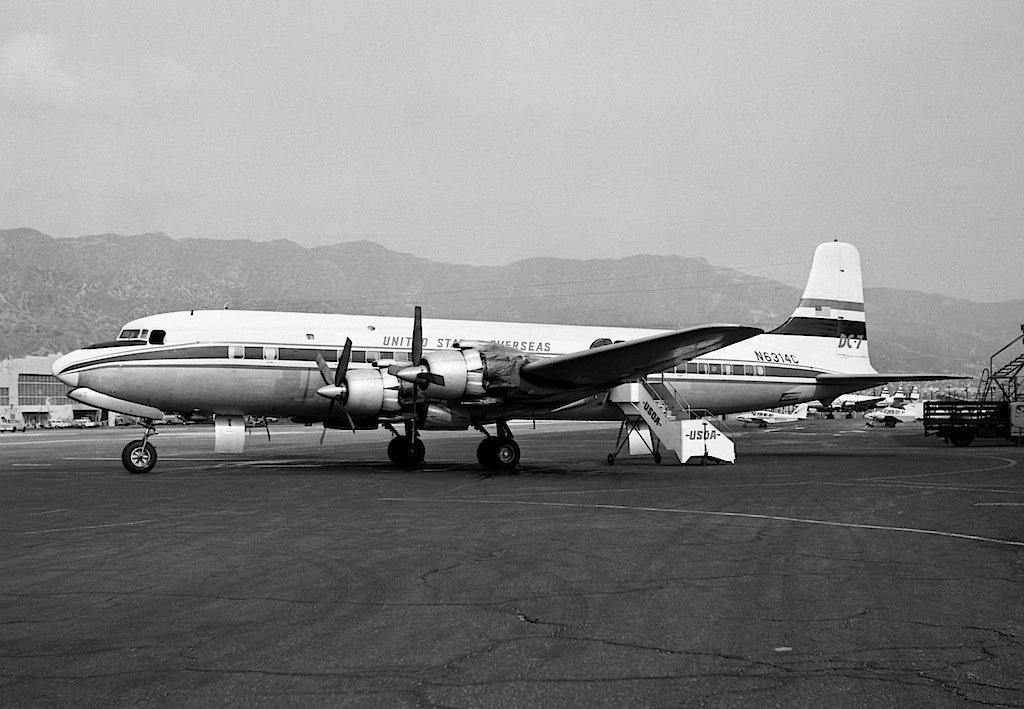
First operation was as Ocean Air Tradeways in 1946 with a DC-4 flight to Saudi Arabia with aviation pioneer Charles F. Blair Jr in the cockpit. United States Overseas Airlines allied military charters to scheduled flights that reached as far as Okinawa, but the CAB shut them in 1964 for being "irredeemably financially unfit"

The 1960s saw an enormous military charter boom as a result of the combination of Vietnam-driven military charter demand, the transfer to the airlines of volume previously carried by the military's own flights and the rise in rates from the end of competitive bidding. From fiscal 1960 to fiscal 1969, DOD international RPMs increased over eight times. Moreover, while in 1960, charter flights supplied only 48.5% of international military RPMs (the balance supplied by the military's own flights), in 1969 that proportion jumped to 93.9%. However, scheduled carriers, by dedicating much larger jet fleets to CRAF, grabbed most of the business. For instance, in 1968 Pan Am had 108 jets enrolled in CRAF, twice that of any other airline, and its fleet included 32 convertible Boeing 707-321Cs. In Fiscal 1968, Pan Am, by itself, received $99.8 million for international military charters, almost as much as the entire supplemental industry, which received $101.7 million. Driven by this military charter bounty, charter RPMs hit an all time high of 18.5% of total US airline industry RPMs in 1969. Of that, scheduled US carriers took over 60% (see Graph 1).

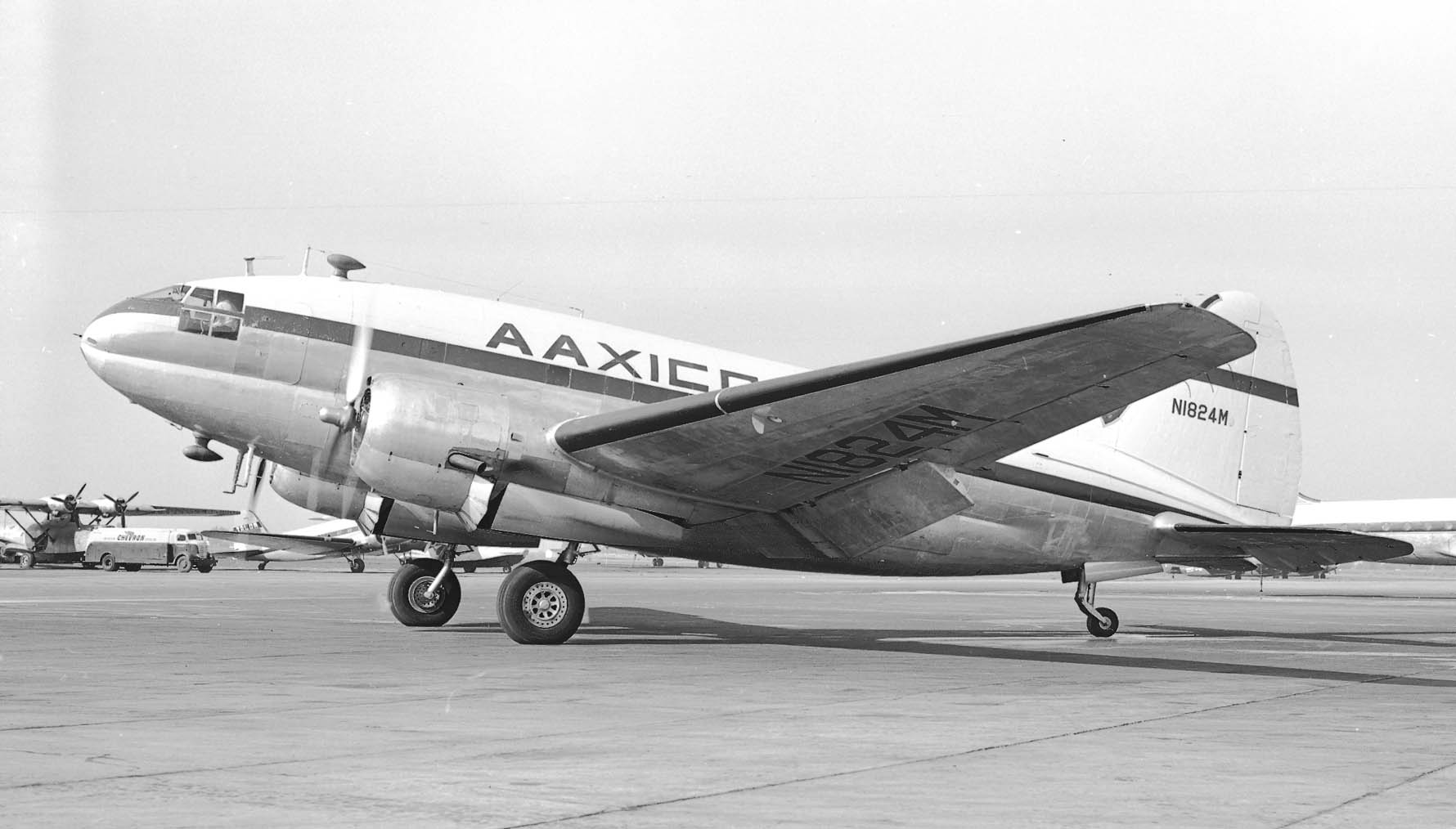
In 1955 the CAB awarded AAXICO Airlines a scheduled cargo certificate, but the airline reverted to being a supplemental in 1962. Financially successful, it merged into Saturn Airways in 1965, with AAXICO the surviving mgmt/ownership

After 1969, military charters diminished substantially, with 1975 military charter RPMs down 74% from the 1969 peak. Cargo dropped even faster, because the US military took delivery of C-141 Starlifters from 1965 and C-5A Galaxies from 1970, which it put to work hauling military cargo. Military charter cargo ton-miles (one ton of freight transported one mile) in 1975 were down to just 5% of the 1967 peak.

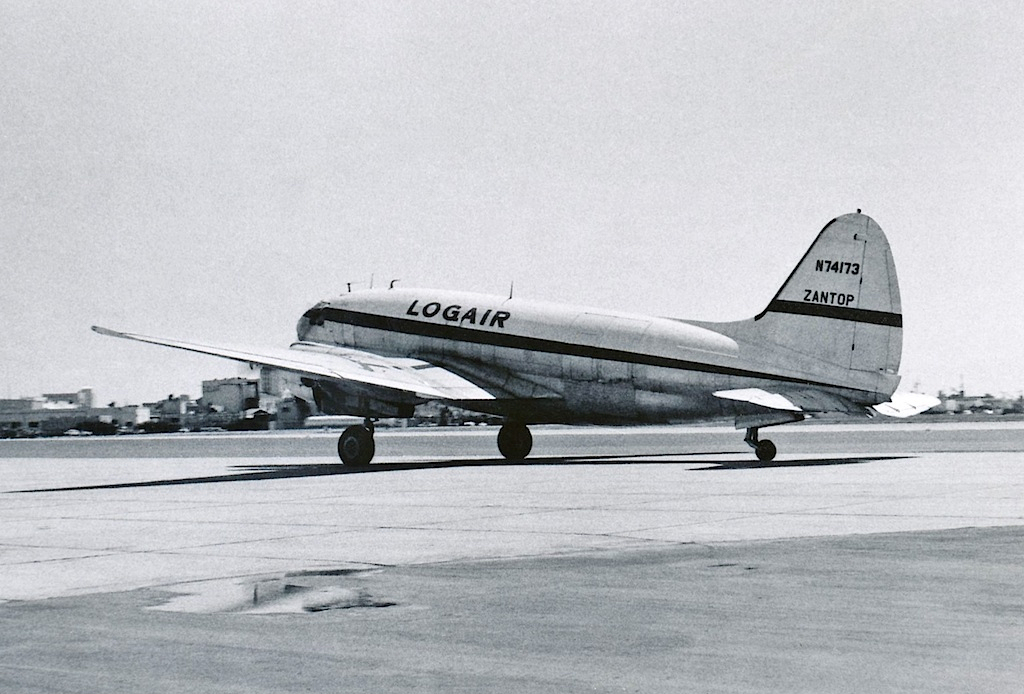
Zantop Air Transport was an uncertificated carrier specializing in flying auto parts and military charters that became a supplemental in 1962 by buying the Coastal Air Lines certificate. The Zantop brothers sold out in 1966 in a transaction brokered by Frank Lorenzo and the airline became Universal Airlines (see below)

=== Civil charters ===
From the late 1960s, the transatlantic became the key civil market for supplementals, as discussed below.

==== Context: IATA and Europe ====
In the 1960s, jet aircraft economics allowed transatlantic air travel to increase dramatically, with one-way passengers rising from 3 million in 1963 to 11 million in 1971. Scheduled fares were even higher than in the US. For instance, in 1971, the standard New York-Paris economy fare was 1/3 higher than New York-Honolulu, which was over 1,200 miles further. IATA, the international scheduled airline club and then a cartel, set international fares. The CAB provided IATA a waiver from US antitrust law. Most governments backed IATA with air service agreements that required IATA fares, plus most IATA carriers were government owned or controlled. In 1973, IATA carriers carried 94% of international scheduled traffic. Even most notable non-IATA carriers, like Aeroflot, used IATA fares, with only a few non-IATA rebels charging lower prices, like Loftleidir Icelandic. Real competition came from charters, which carried 28% of international traffic in 1972 with prices set by supply-and-demand. Charters cost less than half the usual IATA scheduled fares. Competition between IATA and charter carriers was complex. Some prominent IATA carriers had non-IATA charter subsidiaries (e.g. Lufthansa's Condor subsidiary, or Air France's Air Charter International). And as discussed below, many prominent IATA carriers also engaged in wide-scale illegal rebates of IATA scheduled fares. On the Atlantic, charter share rose from 16% in 1963 to 32% in 1971, but in some segments it was far higher: in 1969, over 50% of US-Germany flights, and over 80% of California-Germany flights, were charters.

==== Key market ====
Transatlantic passengers on the supplementals using affinity charters (the main type, discussed below) grew rapidly from 32,000 in 1963 to 781,000 in 1969. From 1966, six supplementals had Atlantic rights, with Atlantic charters accounting for 43% of their civil revenue in 1968, at which time affinity charters were 93% of the total. Supplemental transatlantic passengers then doubled from 1968 to 1969 (also the first year that supplemental civil charter revenue exceeded military). In 1974, the Atlantic accounted for 99% of ONA's civil revenue, 71% of Capitol's and 83% of Saturn's. By 1976, the CAB said the Atlantic accounted for 75% of all supplemental civil operations. Supplementals without Atlantic authority mostly died: Standard (1969), Purdue (1971), Modern (1975) and McCulloch (1977, successor to Vance International). Those with Atlantic authority mostly survived: Capitol, ONA (voluntarily liquidated 1978 as discussed below), Saturn, TIA, and World. The exceptions were Johnson Flying Service (no Atlantic rights but sold to Evergreen Helicopters in 1975), Southern Air Transport (no rights, but a CIA-subsidiary until 1973, then not a supplemental thru 1977) and Universal (successor to Zantop), which bought American Flyers in 1971 for its Atlantic rights. The CAB tried to strip Universal of Atlantic rights in 1972 and while President Nixon prevented it, the uncertainty had already killed Universal by cutting it off from finance.

==== Affinity and other charters ====
The supplementals were limited in the kinds of charters they could offer. Until the early 1970s these were:

- Affinity (or pro-rata) charter: sponsored for members by a club or organization (that existed for purposes other than travel). Passengers had to be a member for at least six months prior. The cost of a charter was shared, pro-rata, among those flying, so price per person depended on how many passengers flew. From 1964, organizations could share an affinity charter.
- Single entity: for instance, a corporation charters a flight to Europe to reward top salespeople.
- Study trip: a charter in conjunction with education, e.g. students studying in Europe for the summer.
- From 1966 the CAB allowed inclusive tour charters (ITC) but required three overnight stops at least 50 miles apart with high minimum spend/minimum stay requirements. The US tour market remained underdeveloped: In 1972, only 150,000 Americans traveled on ITCs compared to 12 million Europeans.

Affinity charters were dominant until the last years of the regulated era, but had many problems. They were discriminatory; consumers were excluded if not a member of a "charterworthy" club (the term of art) and such members tended to be wealthier. Charter prices were much lower: in 1965, a typical New York-London charter fare was 20% lower than the lowest fare available on TWA or Pan Am. People lied to get onto affinity charters; violations were "rampant," with an active gray and black market. ONA's CEO noted even the clergy would lie to fly such charters because the CAB was withholding low fares from the public for no good reason. In 1972, the CAB created the Travel Group Charter (TGC) as an affinity replacement. Any group of 40 could use a TGC, but the CAB ringed the TGC with so many conditions it was hardly used, unlike the simpler Advance Booking Charter (ABC) created in Canada and Europe in the same timeframe. In 1975, charter type shares for supplementals on the Atlantic were 73% affinity, 13% ITC, 9% single entity, 1% TGC.

==== CAB enforcement ====
The CAB vigorously pursued enforcement against supplementals. Supplementals required passengers to sign statements confirming they met charter requirements but the CAB held airlines, not passengers, responsible for violations, issuing fines, cease-and-desist orders and threats to revoke certification. A CAB official admitted over half its enforcement activity was directed against charters. Yet scheduled carriers engaged in illegal activity related to scheduled flights, but attracted no CAB sanction. In the early 1970s, there were a half billion dollars in annual illegal transatlantic scheduled fare rebates, but the CAB turned a blind eye until a US Department of Justice investigation resulted in fines and consent decrees from 19 airlines in 1975, including Pan Am, TWA and most European flag carriers (e.g. Air France, Lufthansa, British Airways, KLM, etc). The CAB's aggressive stance on possible illegal charter activity contrasted with its slow response to consumer complaints against scheduled carriers, one case taking eight years to resolve. The CAB imposed onerous charter overhead. Over 60 pages of filings were required per charter flight. Changes required refiling rather than amendment and changes too close to the date of the flight could force cancellation. Another indication of the focus of CAB bureaucracy were CAB filing fees. Although charters amounted to a few percent of US airline revenues, charter filings accounted for 24% of total CAB filing fees.

=== 1969 to 1975: regulatory tightening ===
From 1969 to early 1975, US airline regulation tightened. The US industry suffered a downturn starting 1969. Widebody aircraft deliveries led to a capacity glut and combined with an economic downturn and substantial labor cost increases, led to poor results. The 1971 annual report of the Air Transport Association (the scheduled airlines club, in 2024 known as Airlines for America) said 1970 was a year of "serious financial depression." It also put part of the blame on supplementals. The 1973 oil crisis hit hard, with increased fuel prices adding $1 billion to 1974 scheduled airline costs of $14 billion. Starting 1970, the CAB pursued an unannounced route moratorium, no longer responding to new route requests. The CAB also coordinated capacity reductions among scheduled carriers. In 1973, Nixon appointed Robert D. Timm as CAB chair, who pushed for a 12% industry return on investment and the CAB refused any fare reduction that threatened this goal. The CAB was determined to limit low fares: from 1971 to 1974, 2/3 of the CAB's field investigative efforts were directed towards ensuring low-fares weren't breaking the law.

In 1973–1974 the CAB pushed supplementals to coordinate Atlantic pricing with scheduled carriers. When negotiations between supplementals and IATA broke down, the CAB imposed minimum charter prices ("guidelines") as part of a plan to help financially distressed Pan Am. Ensuring Pan Am's survival was a Nixon administration priority. Atlantic charter prices had always been set by the market and the CAB had no right to set prices internationally, but the CAB had the right to investigate and promised to investigate charter rates below the minimums. The Department of Justice believed this to be illegal. Senator Ted Kennedy, with the assistance of future Supreme Court justice Stephen Breyer, held hearings on this topic in November 1974. The Kennedy hearings on CAB conduct that started February 1975 were later seen as kicking off a swing towards deregulation that culminated in the 1978 Airline Deregulation Act, but Kennedy saw the November 1974 hearings on transatlantic charter pricing as starting the process. The supplementals challenged the CAB in court and got a stay. Meanwhile, Timm was caught vacationing with scheduled airline CEOs, paid for by aircraft manufacturers and President Ford did not reappoint him as CAB Chair for 1975. The CAB dropped the minimum charter price policy February 1975.

=== 1975: fall of South Vietnam ===
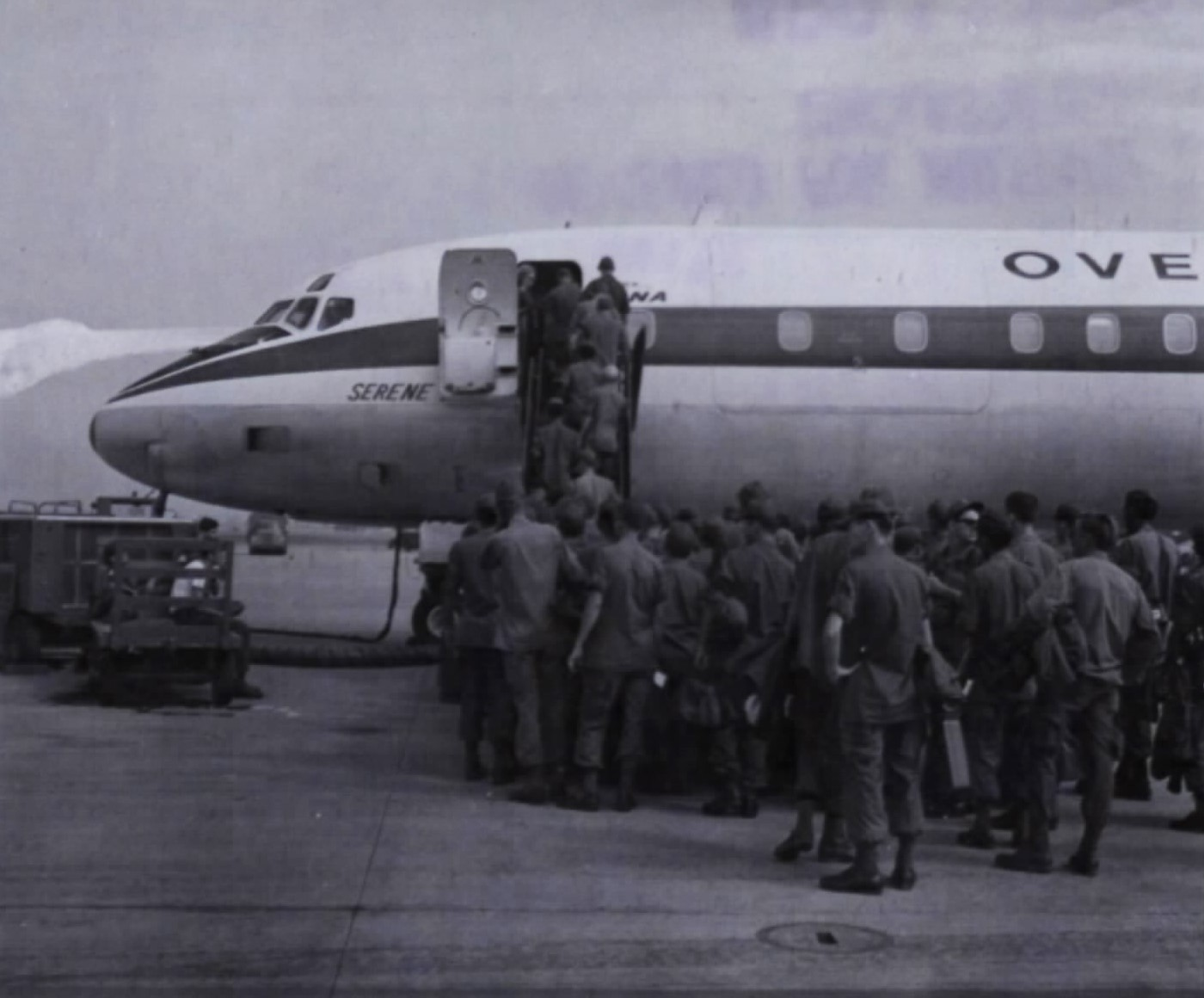
US soldiers board ONA DC-8 at Bien Hoa Air Base near Saigon in 1970. Note aircraft name.

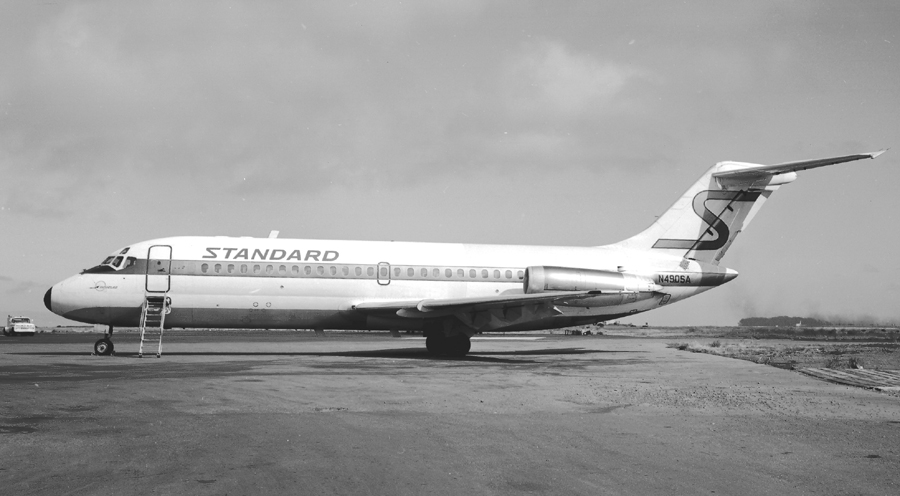
No relation to Standard Air Lines, Standard Airways started as San Diego-based Standard Air Cargo and led an intermittent existence. From late 1960 to 1964 it flew "Pink Cloud" propliner scheduled flights to Hawaii, but a 1963 accident shook its weak finances and it stopped operating January 1964. Revived by an investor group in 1966, it flew DC-9s and Boeing 707s with an unusual red and gold livery until collapsing in 1969

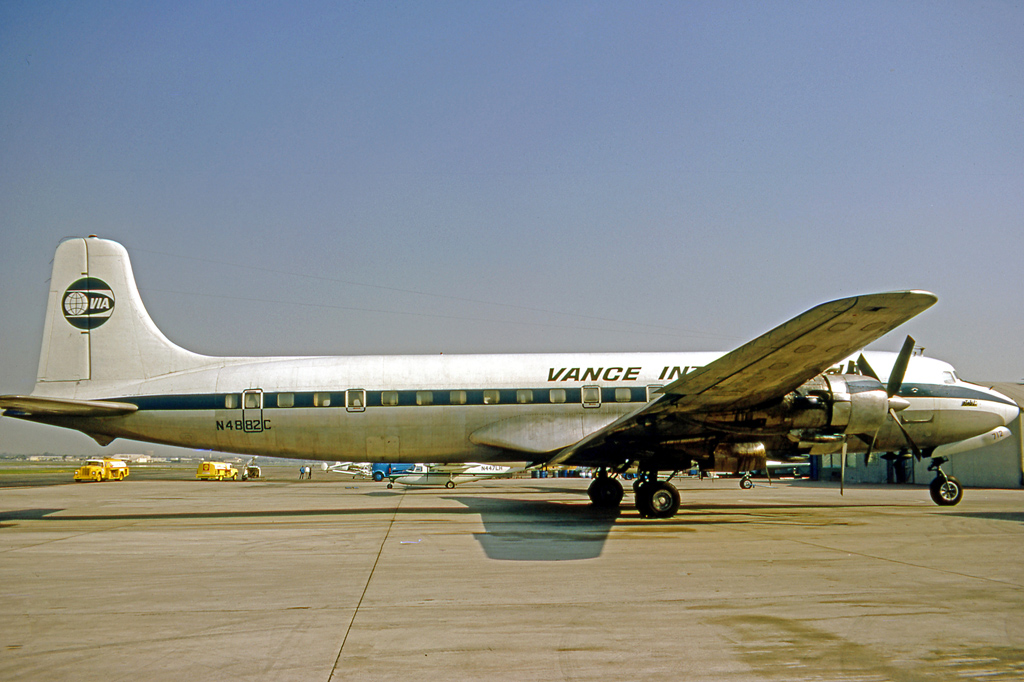
In 1960 the CAB certificated Vance Roberts's tiny Seattle operation as a supplemental, which incorporated in 1965 as Vance International Airways (VIA). By 1970, investors forced the turnover of VIA to Robert P. McCulloch, creating McCulloch International Airlines (MIA), which initially took potential buyers to McCulloch's Lake Havasu City real estate development

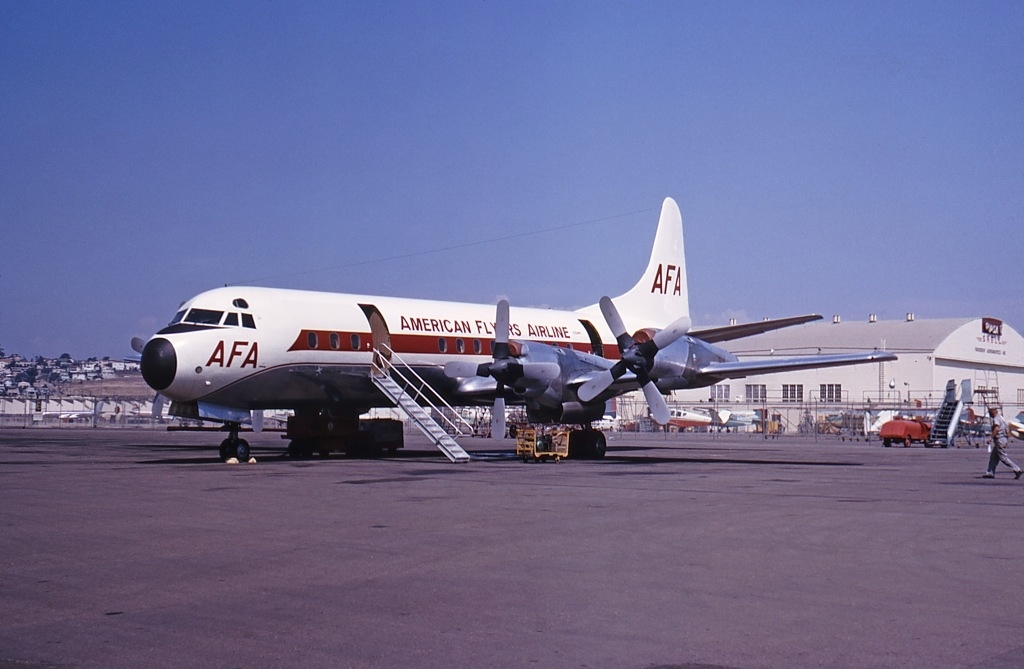
Texas-based American Flyers Airline (AFA) grew from pilot Reed Pigman's post-war flight school, under his control until he died crashing an AFA Electra in 1966. A Pittsburgh investor bought AFA in 1967 and moved it to Harrisburg in 1969. Money-losing AFA was sold to Universal Airlines in 1971

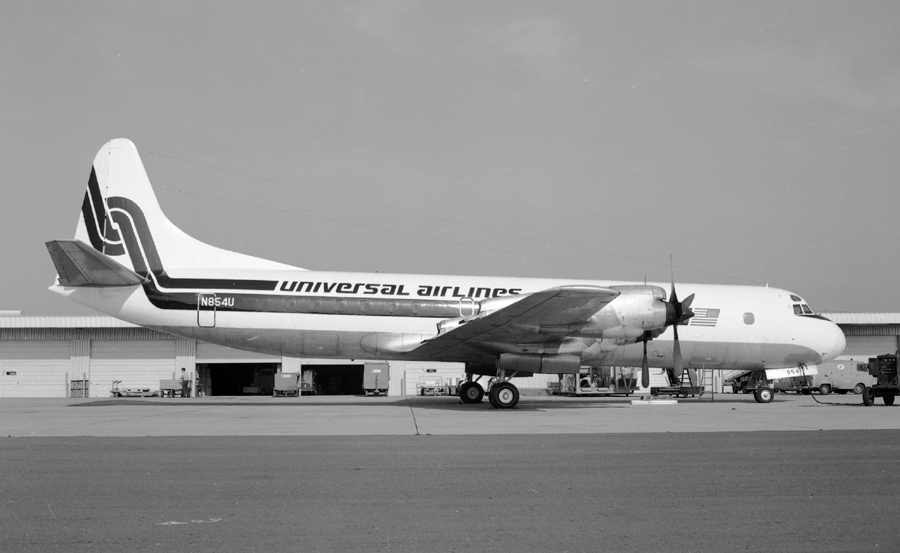
Detroit and later Oakland-based Universal Airlines was Zantop Air Transport after a 1966 ownership change brokered by Frank Lorenzo. Universal bought American Flyers Airline for its transatlantic rights in 1971, but failed the next year, leaving a need to fly autoparts, quickly filled by Zantop International Airlines

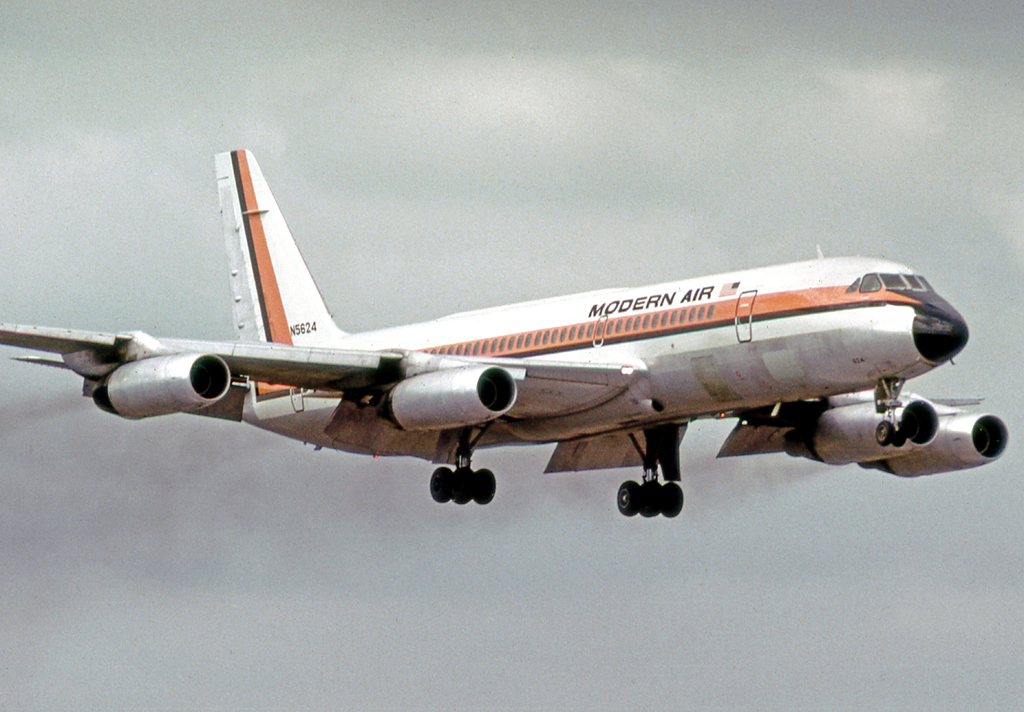
Long Island-based Modern Air Transport (MAT) moved to Trenton, New Jersey in the 1950s. From the late 1950s the airline flew customers for a Florida land company, which bought MAT in 1966, moving it to Miami. Never profitable thereafter, MAT's only money-maker were Cold War West Berlin charters. Cut off by its parent company, MAT collapsed in 1975

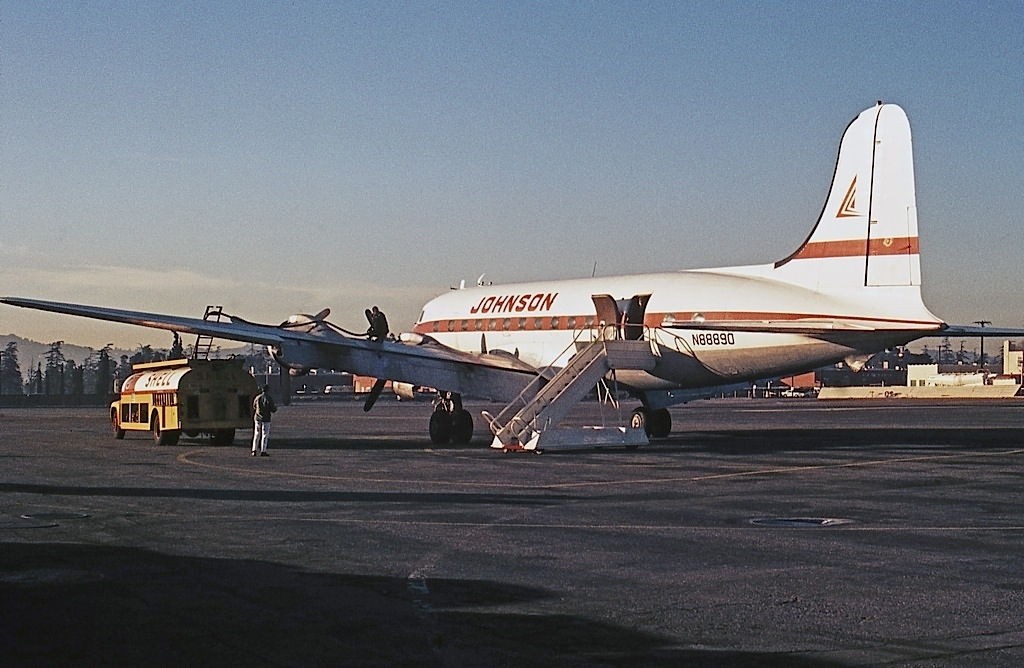
Montana-based Johnson Flying Service (JFS) started mountain flying in 1924, mostly for the US Forest Service. Evergreen Aviation bought JFS in 1975; the CAB stopped earlier attempts by Executive Jet Aviation (today's NetJets) and US Steel

World Airways made headlines at least twice during the fall of South Vietnam in 1975. One was the last flight out of Da Nang on 29 March 1975, with thousands of desperate people rushing a World Boeing 727, injuring many including CEO Ed Daly. The damaged aircraft took off with hundreds of people on board, including in the cargo compartment. The other was World's activities airlifting Vietnamese orphans, including outfitting a 747 as a flying hospital, bringing hundreds of children to the US (part of a wider effort known as Operation Babylift). As previously mentioned, the supplementals were deeply involved in Vietnam through military charters. In Fiscal 1969, World's international military charter revenues were $52 million (over $400 million in 2024 terms), the third largest that year after Pan Am ($65 million) and Continental ($55 million).

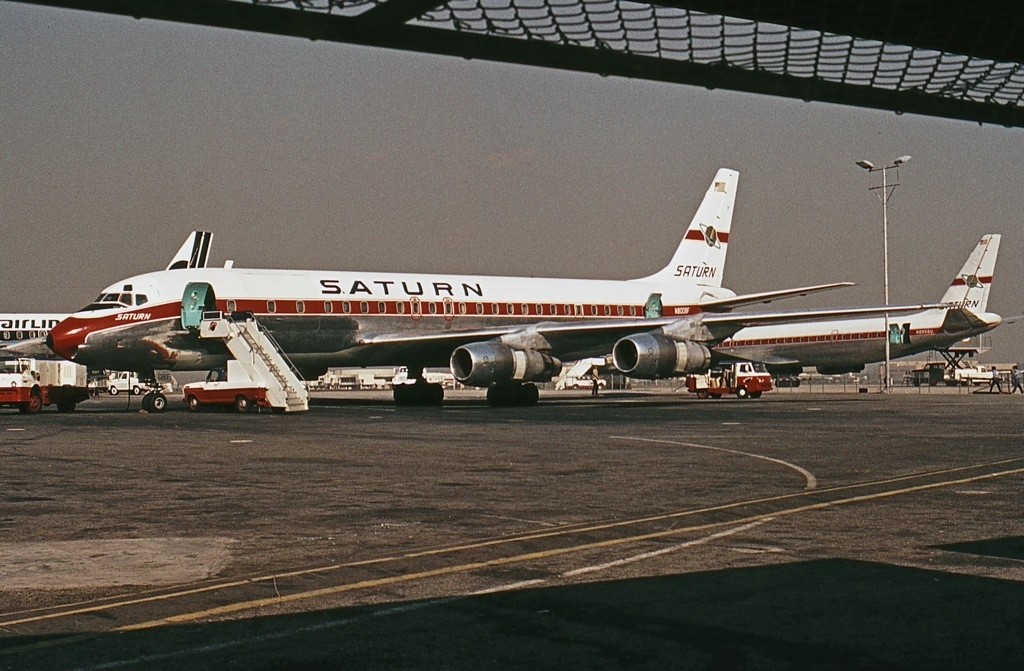
Miami-based All American Airways, unrelated to the local service carrier All American Airways that became US Airways, changed its name to Saturn Airways in 1960 and bought AAXICO in 1965, leaving AAXICO in control. Post-AAXICO Saturn was profitable, freight-oriented and Oakland-based. It sold out to Trans International in 1976

=== 1975 to 1978: regulatory relaxation ===
The regulatory pendulum now swung the other direction. In 1975, following the Kennedy hearings, President Ford appointed pro-competition CAB chair John E. Robson. This was followed by President Carter's 1977 appointment of Alfred E. Kahn, leading to the 1978 Airline Deregulation Act.

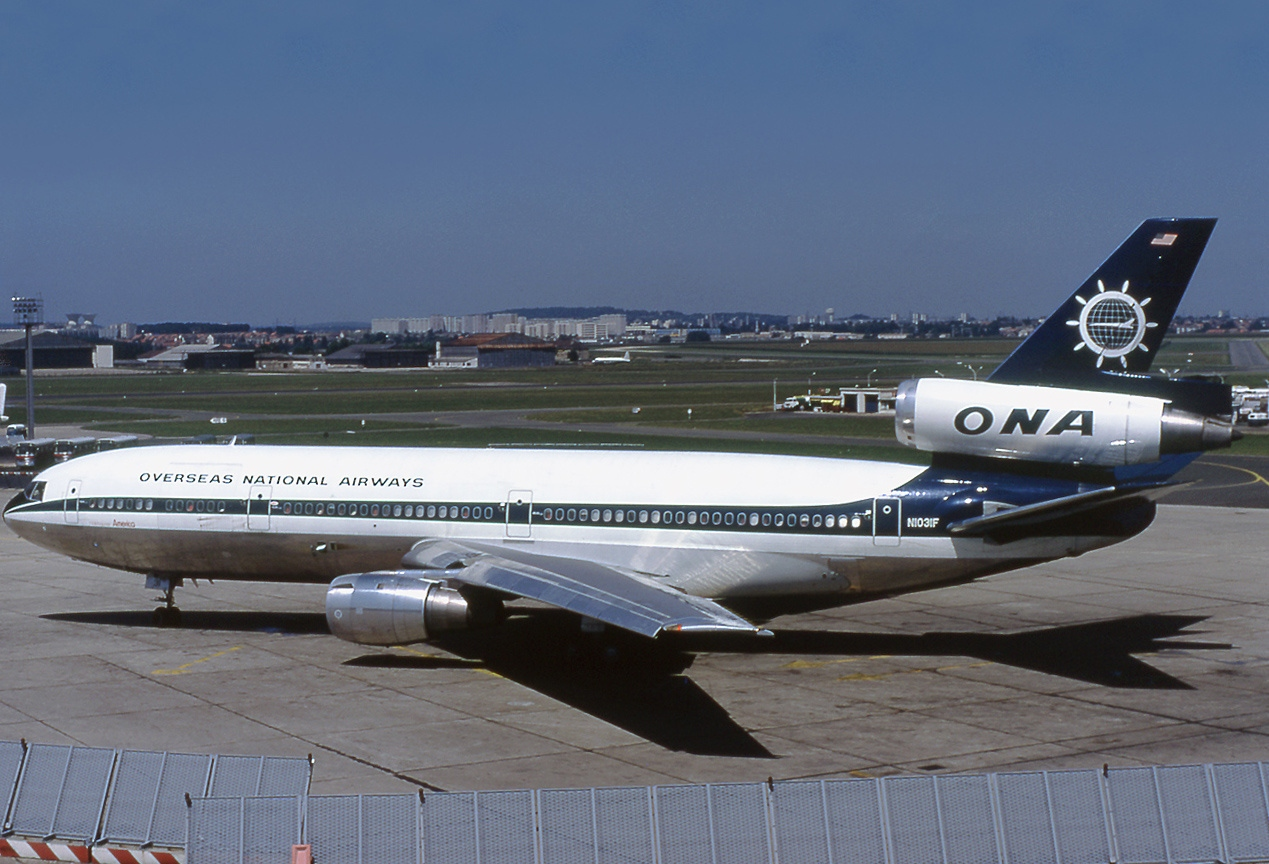
Founded in San Francisco, Overseas National Airways was a big military operator until 1963 bankruptcy. Investors revived ONA in New York in 1965, making it the second-largest supplemental by 1969. ONA voluntarily liquidated outside bankruptcy in 1978 after failed diversification, heavy losses and three crashes within 16 months

In autumn 1975, the CAB approved European-style one-stop inclusive tour charters (first impacting summer season 1976) followed in autumn 1976 by European-style Advance Booking Charters (ABCs). Other than being booked well in advance through a tour company, ABCs were little different than a scheduled flight. Charters boomed in 1976, especially to places like Hawaii and Las Vegas. Even greater success in 1977 with the new ABC seemed certain. The New York Times and others ran stories about how the future of travel belonged to charters. But in spring 1977, American Airlines (then mostly a domestic airline) introduced Supersaver fares, designed to fill empty seats with charter-type customers. US scheduled carriers had lots of empty seats: in the early 1970s the CAB had a policy of targeting 55% load factors, up from 50%. By the end of that summer, it was clear Supersavers were destroying domestic charters. However, the new charters did succeed in dislodging affinity charters as the prevalent type of charter.

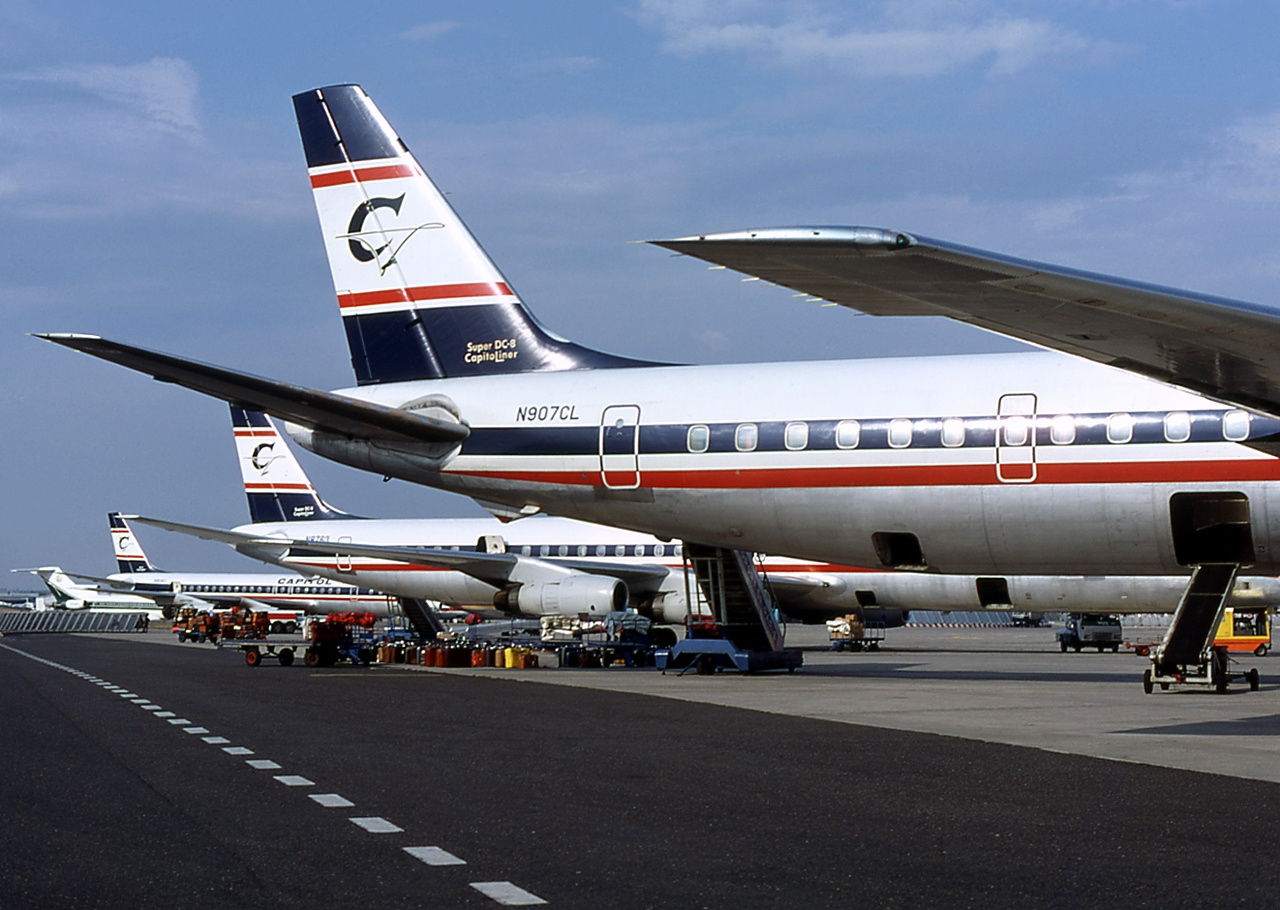
Nashville-based Capitol Airways (not to be confused with trunk carrier Capital) had a base at Wilmington, Delaware 1958–1970 before moving base and HQ to Smyrna, Tennessee. Capitol was prominent throughout the CAB era but, as Capitol Air, was an early deregulation casualty in 1984

In September 1977, British charter carrier Laker Airways started Skytrain service from New York to London. Skytrain was a no-reservation scheduled flight at a charter fare, something Laker had wanted since 1971. Scheduled airlines responded with low fares of their own. In the six months ending March 1978, the London-New York market expanded by 39%; the number of low fares (including charters) sold across the Atlantic exploded by over 300% in the first quarter of 1978 over the prior year. Unsurprisingly, this hurt charters: in the first six months of 1978, New York-London supplemental traffic declined 42% from the year prior. In 1978, to help keep the charter carriers in the game, the CAB created a "public charter," with basically no requirements: no advance purchase, no minimum group size, no minimum spend, no minimum stay, etc. But supplementals needed to price below scheduled fares to attract customers. In early 1978, the required spread was estimated as $50 round trip between London and New York. In winter 1977/78 and 1978/79, the lowest New York-London scheduled fares were at or below this spread, approaching charter levels.

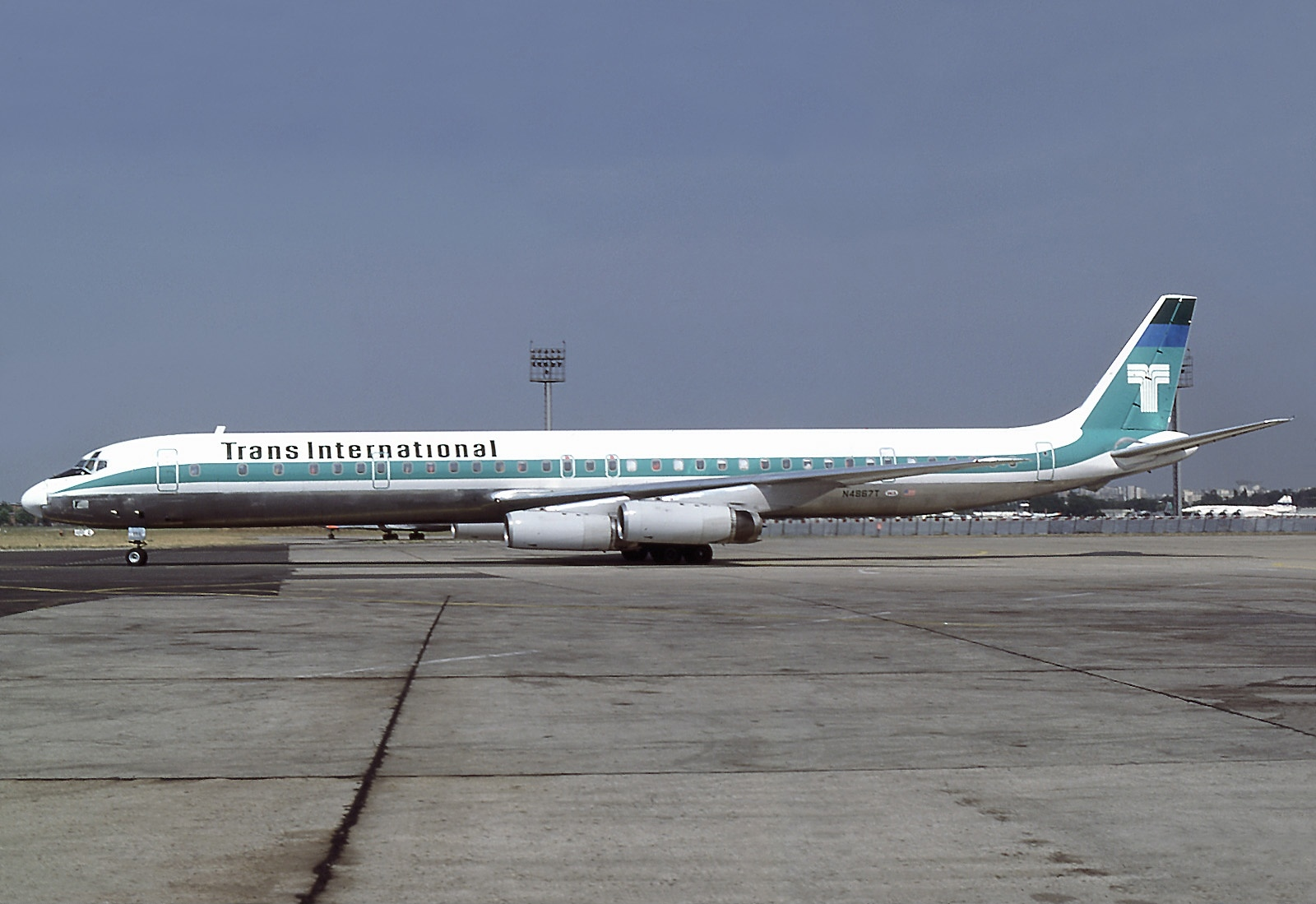
Los Angeles Air Service traded aircraft as much as it flew until owner Kirk Kerkorian changed the name to Trans International Airlines (TIA) in 1960. Kerkorian sold to Transamerica Corporation in 1968 for a fortune. TIA bought Saturn in 1976 to end the CAB era as the largest supplemental. But when offered for sale in 1986, then Transamerica Airlines was worth more dead than alive.

=== Deregulation: end of the supplementals ===
The four remaining Atlantic-flying supplementals (Capitol, ONA, TIA, World) reacted in very different ways to approaching deregulation. By the end of 1978, Capitol, TIA and World Airways applied for and received authority for scheduled Atlantic service. By contrast, ONA chose to cease operating September 1978, the culmination of failed diversification, poor financial results and three aircraft crashes within a 16 month period from November 1975 through March 1977, including the loss of two widebody DC-10s within two months. In the face of regulatory uncertainty, ONA liquidated outside bankruptcy, selling aircraft into a strong market.

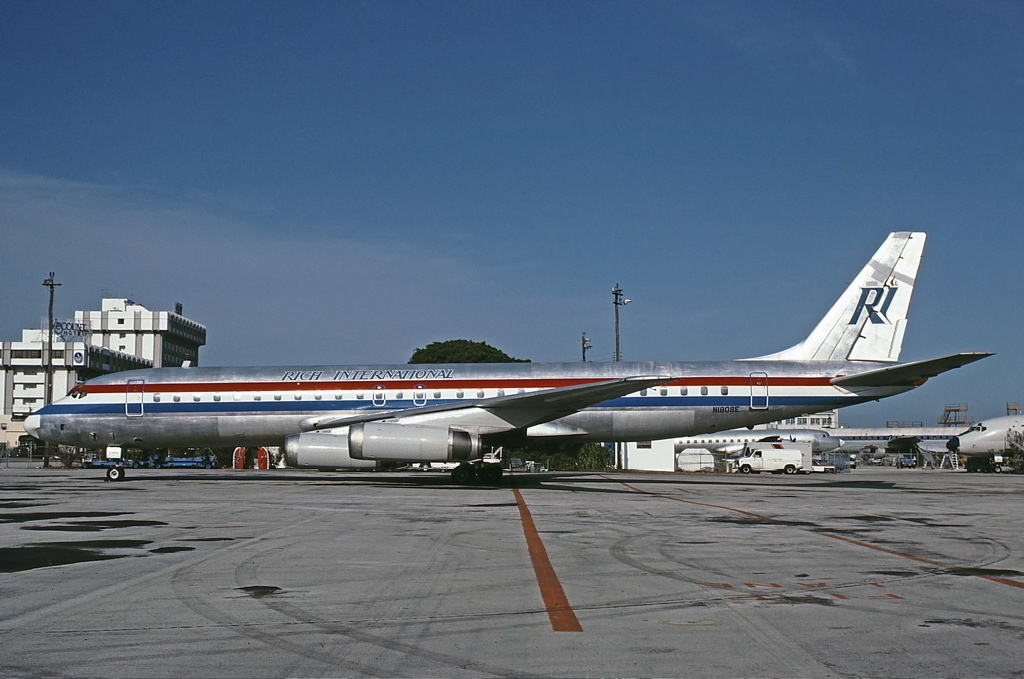
A rare airline founded by a woman, Miami-based Rich International Airways (RIA) started in 1970 as an uncertificated carrier flying cargo C-46s to the Caribbean. Certificated in 1977 as a supplemental cargo carrier, RIA reorganized as a passenger charter carrier in 1984 but collapsed in a 1996 Federal Aviation Administration post-ValuJet Flight 592 crackdown

In October 1978, President Carter signed the Airline Deregulation Act, which was literally the end for supplementals. The Act replaced the word "supplemental" with "charter" (at least for economic purposes; see Legacy below) and ushered the US industry into deregulation as of 1 January 1979. The Act immediately diminished the CAB's powers and further stripped its authority in stages until the agency's end date of 1 January 1985. Until then, the CAB spoke of charter air carriers, not supplementals. For instance, the CAB Handbook of Aviation Statistics Supplement for 1977 and 1978, published 1979, replaced almost all instances of the word "supplemental" with "charter" versus the earlier edition covering 1975 and 1976, published 1977. Effective 1981, the CAB abandoned the old categories of trunk, local service, charter, etc and simply grouped airlines by revenue.

For a snapshot of the supplementals in 1978, see 1978 survivors below.

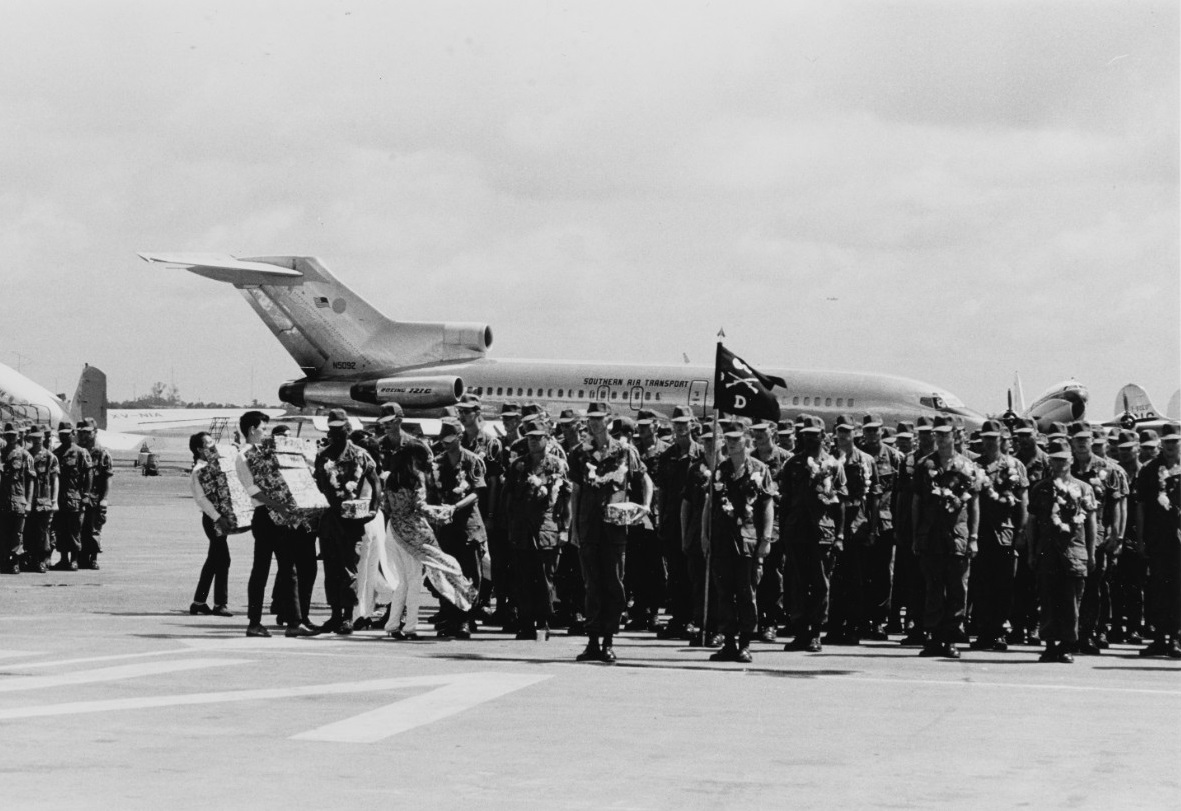
The CIA secretly bought Miami-based, mostly-cargo Southern Air Transport (SAT) in 1960, flying it in support of US operations in Vietnam. The CIA sold then-uncertificated SAT in 1973. SAT recertificated as a supplemental in 1977, becoming a large freight airline after deregulation, collapsing 1998

== Legacy ==
No surviving supplemental made a successful long-term transition to scheduled service after 1979 deregulation. Capitol tried scheduled service but shut down in 1984. TIA also offered scheduled service, but when its parent put it up for sale in 1986, the airline (then called Transamerica) was worth more dead than alive. World tried scheduled service but reverted to charter and cargo. Rich International lasted until 1996, mostly as a passenger charter carrier. Southern Air Transport and Zantop International lasted until the late 1990s and early 2000s respectively as cargo carriers. Evergreen became a sizeable carrier, mainly freight, but shut in 2013. In 2014, World was the last former supplemental to cease operations.

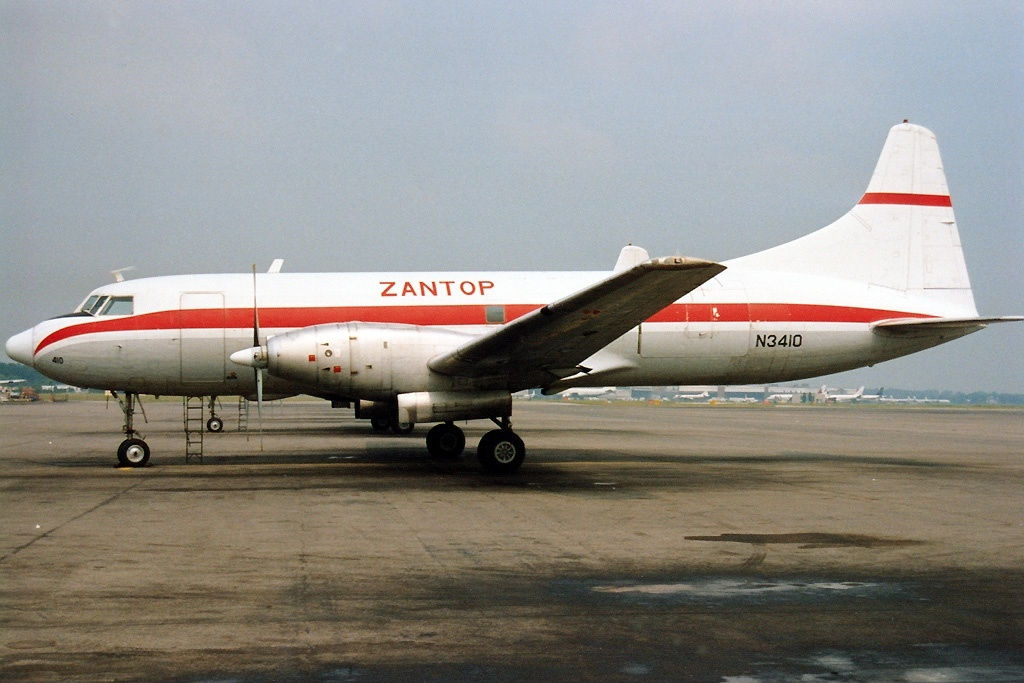
The Zantop brothers had Ypsilanti-based Zantop International Airlines (ZIA) flying autoparts as an uncertificated carrier within a month of the 1972 collapse of Universal. ZIA certificated as a supplemental in 1977 and survived into the 21st century as a freight airline after deregulation

The most durable legacy of the irregular/supplemental airlines may be coach class. The supplementals also got some credit for inspiring airline deregulation. The Kennedy subcommittee report concentrated far more on intrastate airlines than supplementals, but one academic paper of the time credited the supplementals as an "agent of change."

While US regulations regarding economic aspects of airlines use the word "charter" (e.g. 14 CFR Part 380—Public Charters), "supplemental" is still present in regulations concerning operational matters (e.g. 14 CFR Part 121—Operating Requirements: Domestic, Flag, and Supplemental Operations). Thus the Federal Aviation Administration, which oversees airline operations, still speaks of supplementals.

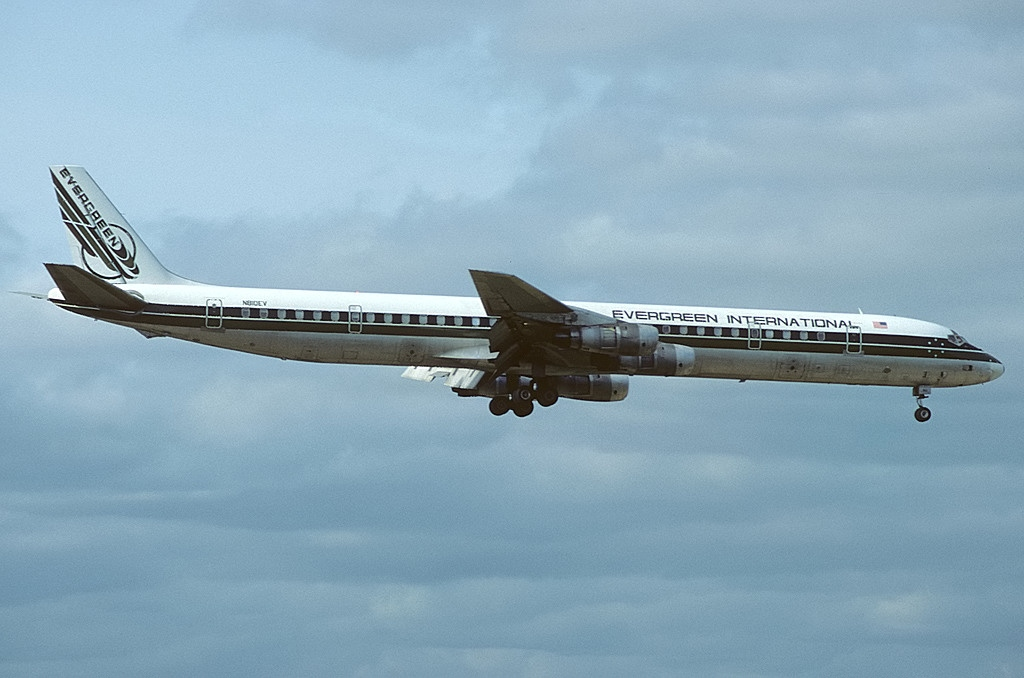
Evergreen Helicopters bought Johnson Flying Service in 1975 to create Evergreen International Airlines (EIA). EIA became a substantial jet operation after deregulation, ceasing 2013. An Oregon aviation museum survives, its centerpiece the Spruce Goose of Howard Hughes

As of 2024, the US Department of Transportation still lists affinity and single entity charters as approved types of charters that an airline can offer, along with public charters.

As of 2024 charters are a very small niche within the US airline industry. US Department of Transportation data shows charters accounted for about half a percent of US airline industry revenue passenger miles in 2023.

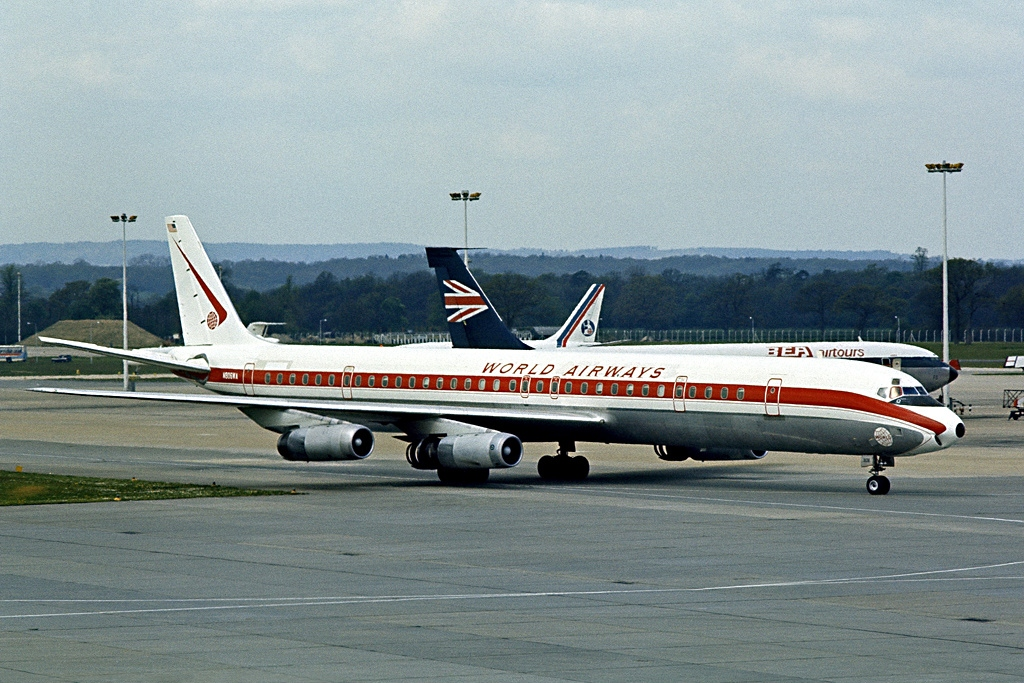
Ed Daly bought World Airways in 1950, moving it from Teterboro to Oakland in 1956. World rode the Vietnam boom to become the largest supplemental in the 1960s, ending the CAB era second only to Trans International in 1978. World briefly tried scheduled service after deregulation but reverted to charters and cargo until ceasing operations in 2014, the last of the supplemental air carriers

== Supplemental air carrier mortality ==
=== Summary ===
As described in 1978 survivors below, only seven supplementals survived to the end of the regulated era in 1978, representing nine original irregular or supplemental carriers (accounting for two mergers). As previously mentioned, the CAB provided 162 letters of registration to large irregular carriers and another dozen to pure cargo irregular carriers. As discussed in New Entrants below, the CAB added net five more supplemental carriers over time. So the total number of irregular/supplemental carriers created was 162+12+5 = 179. Further, as described in Graduates below, the CAB certificated a net ten irregular or supplemental carriers as scheduled passenger (three) or cargo (seven) carriers, which can thus be excluded. So the survival rate can be seen as nine out of (179 - 10) = 169 or 5.3%. The mortality rate of irregular/supplemental carriers under CAB regulation was therefore well over 90%.

Few CAB-regulated scheduled operators died. The CAB sought to boost weak scheduled carriers by giving them desirable routes. If such a carrier got into serious trouble, the CAB would let them merge with a stronger scheduled line. The ones that did perish were minor. Among the original scheduled carriers grandfathered under the 1938 Act, the only one that ceased operations rather than merge was tiny two-aircraft Wilmington-Catalina Airline (later known as Catalina Air Transport). Among international carriers there was one-aircraft Samoan Airlines and no-aircraft Uraba, Medellin and Central Airways (a Pan Am subsidiary that Pan Am requested to shut down). Oddball international carrier Resort Airlines, with scheduled authority limited to flying all-expense paid tours, went out of business in 1960. In the early days of local service carriers the CAB declined to renew the temporary certificates of Florida Airways, Mid-West Airlines and E.W. Wiggins Airways. A later exception was former air taxi operator TAG Airlines, certificated by the CAB for scheduled service on a single city pair, only to suffer a crash that put it out of business.

A broader exception were the CAB-certificated scheduled freight carriers, where mortality was substantial: four out of eight went out of business (Airnews, U. S. Airlines, Aerovias Sud Americana, Slick Airways). All eight scheduled freight carriers were former irregular air carriers. For details see the articles for these carriers.

=== 1978 survivors ===
In 1978, the last year of the regulated era, the CAB listed ten supplementals, shown in Table 2. But Modern Air Transport ceased operation in 1975, McCulloch in 1977 and ONA in September 1978. The remaining seven represented nine original carriers among them, given that Saturn (originally All American Airways) merged into TIA in 1976 and AAXICO merged into Saturn in 1965.

The 1978 supplementals were modest. The 1978 supplemental sector revenue of $530 million accounted for just 2.3% of total 1978 US CAB-regulated airline industry revenues (scheduled plus supplemental) of $23.4 billion (25 years earlier the industry revenue share of the irregular air carriers was 5%—see 1953 snapshot). The military accounted for only 23% of supplemental revenue in 1978. Only TIA's revenues of $231 million (about $1.1 billion in 2024 dollars) were comparable to some of the smaller domestic scheduled airlines like the local service carriers. TIA had bigger 1978 revenues than Ozark ($230 million), Piedmont ($206 million), Southern ($189 million) and Texas International ($181 million), but not even half the revenues of the smallest trunk carrier, National Airlines ($636.4 million).

Table 2: 1978 Supplemental Air Carriers, Revenues and Fleet(1) Out of business by year end(2) Service suspended
Airline	Op revenue (USD mil)	Fleet (bold indicates jet type)
Capitol International	87.0	**12 DC-8**
Evergreen International	40.9	**6 DC-8, 3 DC-9**, 4 Lockheed Electra, 7 CV-580
McCulloch International	1.2	^{(1)}
Modern Air Transport	^{(2)}	
Overseas National	28.3	^{(1)}
Rich International	2.9	2 DC-6, 3 C-46
Southern Air Transport	N/A	2 Lockheed L-100-20, 1 Lockheed L-100-30
Trans International	231.2	**3 DC-10, 14 DC-8**, 11 Lockheed L-100-30, 9 Lockheed Electra
World Airways	126.6	**3 DC-10, 5 DC-8**
Zantop International	10.3	**5 DC-8**, 16 Lockheed Electra, 11 DC-6, 14 CV-640

=== New entrants and re-entrants ===
The CAB certificated five completely new supplementals from 1960 onward:

- Vance International Airways certificated in 1960.
- Purdue Aeronautics Corporation, subsidiary of Purdue University, certificated in 1961.
- **Interstate Airmotive**, a small St Louis-based DC-3 operator, certificated in 1968 but ceased operations in 1972.
- Rich International Airways certificated in 1977.
- Zantop International Airlines, a separate carrier from Zantop Air Transport, certificated in 1977.

The CAB allowed one carrier to become a supplemental by merging with an existing supplemental:

- Zantop Air Transport, a Part 45 carrier, merged with moribund supplemental carrier Coastal Air Lines. Zantop Air Transport (ZAT) and Zantop International Airlines (ZIA) were separate carriers started by the same brothers in different decades, ZAT in the 1950s, ZIA in the 1970s.

Lastly, three carriers lost their status as a supplemental but later regained it:

- California Eastern Aviation lost and then, in 1959, regained its supplemental status.
- AAXICO Airlines recertificated as a supplemental in 1962 after being a scheduled cargo carrier (see Graduates).
- Southern Air Transport was sold by the CIA in 1973, and as part of that process gave up its supplemental status. In 1977, no longer owned by the CIA, it regained it.

=== Graduates ===
Three certificated scheduled passenger carriers started as irregular or supplemental carriers:

- Trans-Pacific Airlines, later known as Aloha Airlines, held a letter of registration as an irregular carrier before being certificated as a scheduled "territorial airline" in the then-territory of Hawaii in 1948.
- The CAB certificated Resort Airlines as an international scheduled carrier in 1949, with scheduled service limited to all-expense-paid tours known as skycruises.
- In 1957 the CAB certificated Trans Caribbean Airways as a territorial carrier to Puerto Rico.

All eight US scheduled cargo airlines of the CAB era started as irregular air carriers. But AAXICO reverted to a supplemental, so net conversions were seven:

- In 1949, the CAB certificated four irregulars, Flying Tiger Line, Slick Airways, U. S. Airlines and **Airnews**, as scheduled domestic cargo airlines.
  - Airnews started by flying newspapers from San Antonio in February 1946 for its parent, a newspaper publisher. The CAB certificated Airnews for a combined air-truck operation within Texas. In 1951 Airnews turned in its certificate. The public was uninterested in the truck component, which the CAB viewed as intrinsic to the certificate, so there was no point in continuing.
- In 1951, Riddle Airlines won CAB certification to fly scheduled cargo from the US east coast to Puerto Rico. The airline was later known as Airlift International.
- Aerovias Sud Americana (dba ASA International Airlines) pioneered Latin American scheduled cargo after being certificated in 1952.
- In 1955, Seaboard & Western Airlines was certificated as an international scheduled cargo airline.
- In 1955, the CAB certificated AAXICO Airlines to fly part of the former U. S. Airlines domestic scheduled cargo franchise. But AAXICO reverted to being a supplemental in 1962, the sole case of an airline becoming scheduled and later reverting to supplemental/irregular.

== See also ==
- List of defunct airlines of the United States
- History of non-scheduled airlines in the United States
