= Near East Air Transport =

US airline that flew migrants to Israel (1949–1951)

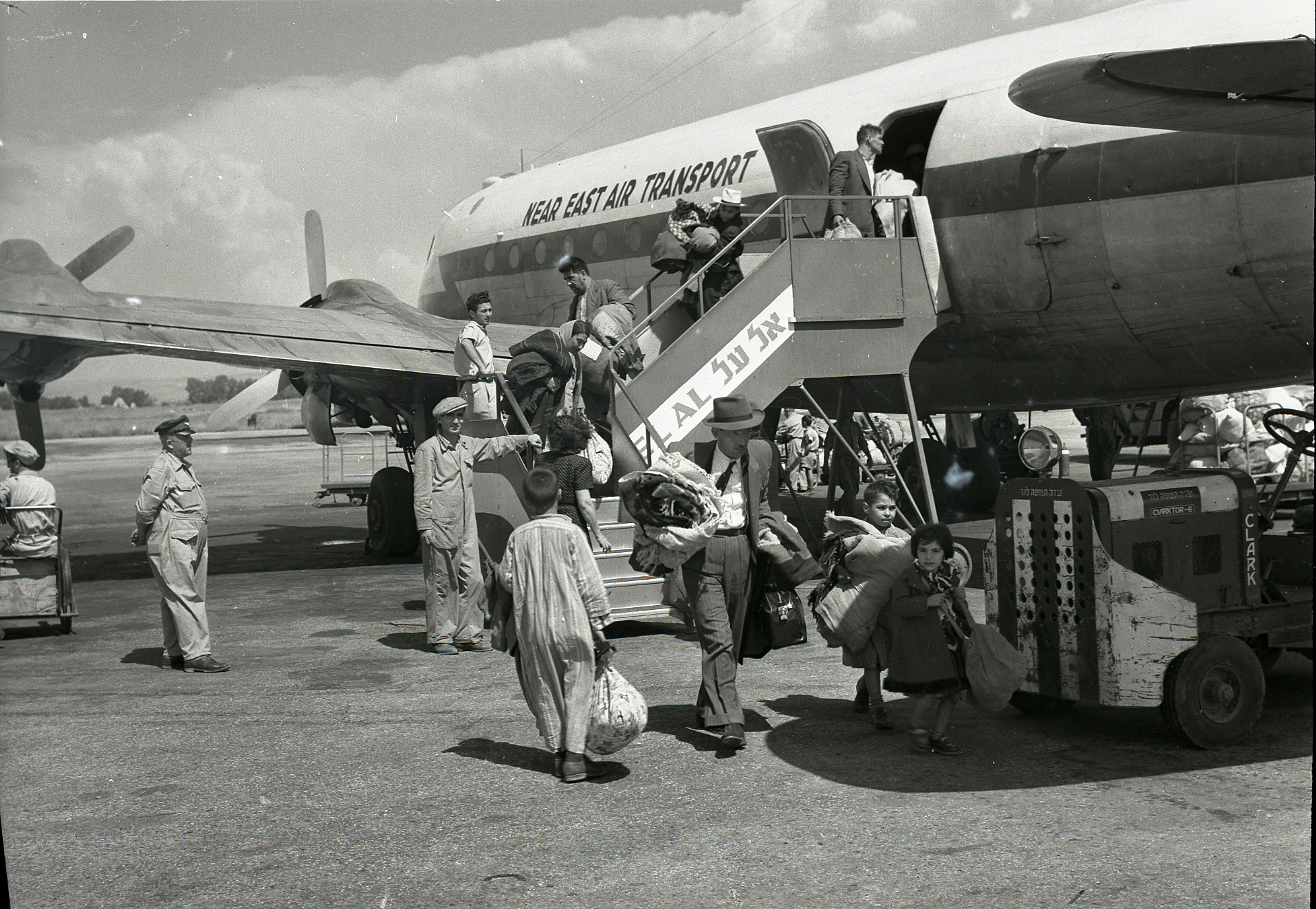
- Iraqi arrivals, DC-4 Tel Aviv April 1951
- Founded: June 1949: Near East Air Transport, Inc. incorporated in Delaware
- Commenced operations: August 7, 1949
- Ceased operations: November 1951
- Operating bases: Tel Aviv; Nicosia; Asmara
- Parent company: Alaska Airlines; El Al
- Headquarters: Rome
- Key people: Robert F. Maguire, Jr. Milton Lang
- Founder: James A. Wooten

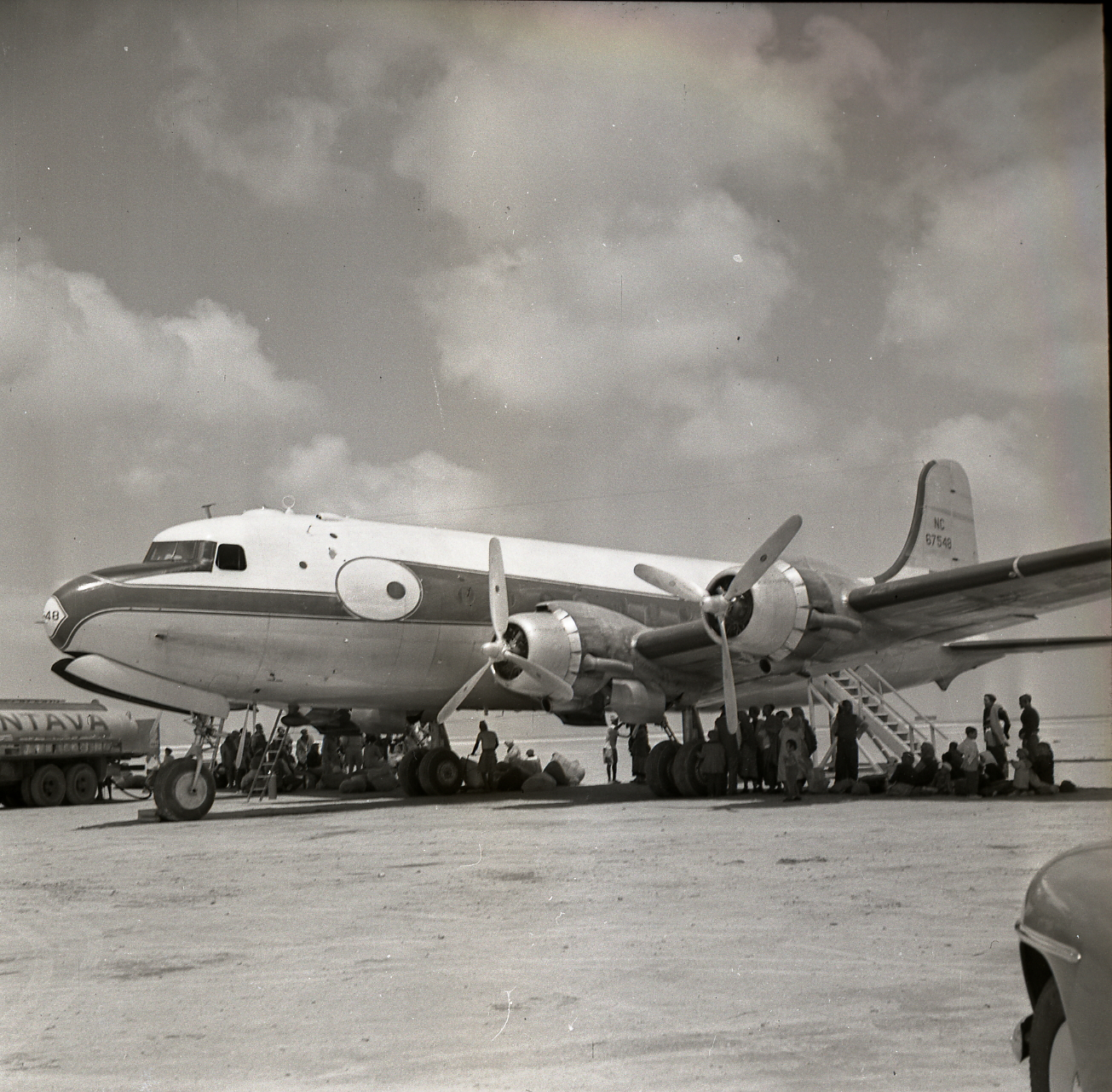
Flying Tiger Line DC-4 May 1950 Aden

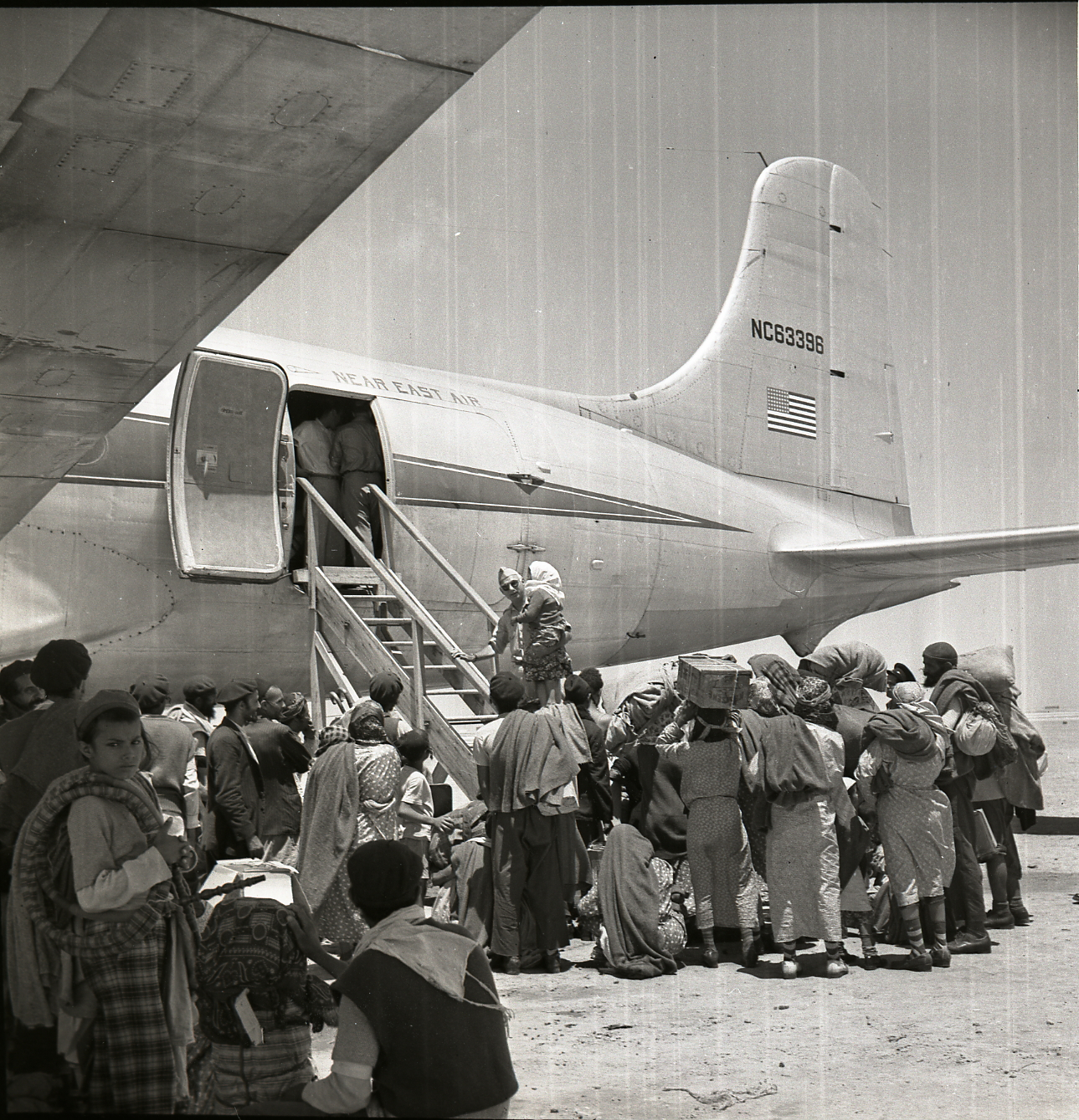
Note "Near East Air" over the door. NC63396 was a Twentieth Century Air Lines DC-4, May 1950 Aden Airport

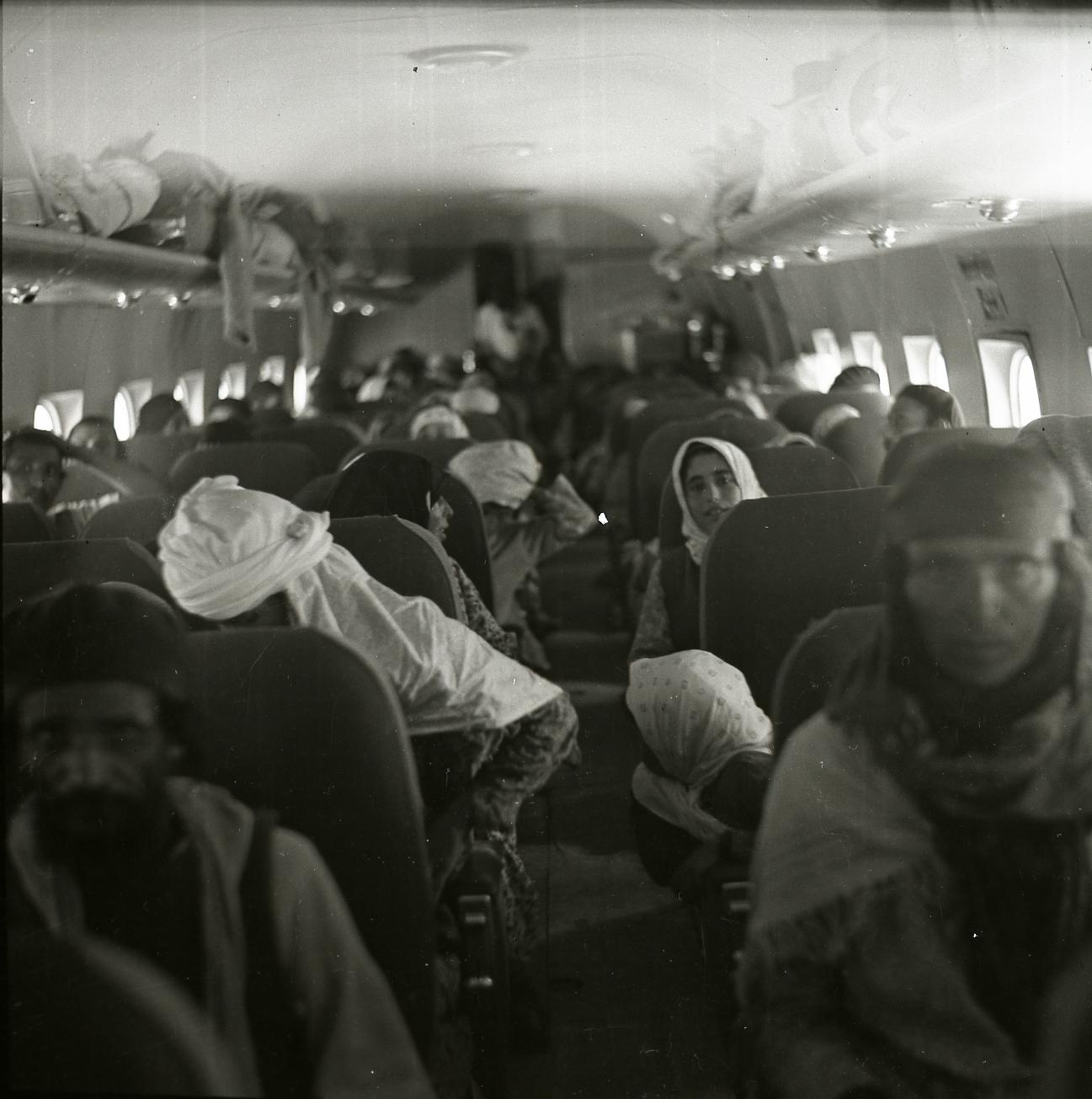
Operation Magic Carpet flight, May 1950

Near East Air Transport (NEAT) was a briefly prominent partially US airline that played a key role in two major operations transporting migrants to Israel in the early years of that state. The name covered two US corporations with overlapping management and ownership:

- Near East Air Transport, Inc. (NEATI) was a US airline that in August 1949 assumed the Middle East operation of Alaska Airlines flying Yemenite Jews to Israel (Operation Magic Carpet), after the US government forced Alaska Airlines out for severe safety and regulatory violations.
- Near East Air Transport, overseas Inc. (NEATO) was a front formed to fly Iraqi Jews to Israel 1950–1951 (Operation Ezra and Nehemiah, known at the time as Operation Ali Baba). Nominally US, NEATO was controlled by Israeli carrier El Al and the state of Israel. Some Israeli agents used NEAT cover for this operation. NEAT also served to control the rate of Iraqi migration.

NEAT deployed both its own aircraft and those contracted to it and during its brief existence flew at least 150,000 people to Israel, mostly from Aden, Baghdad and Basra, but also other regional cities such as Djibouti, Asmara, Tehran, Bahrain and further afield. The carrier attracted attention for the airlifts, sometimes misidentified as Near East Airlines, Near East Airways or Near East Transport.

NEAT was a significant source of demand for US carriers; for instance, it provided the largest non-military contract for US cargo carrier Flying Tiger Line to that time. Israeli aircraft also flew for NEAT, including as a Cuban airline, Intercontinental Aerea de Cuba, established for the purpose. NEAT further took an equity stake and management role in another Latin American carrier, Aerovias Venezuela Europa, which also flew charters to Israel.

== History ==
=== Alaska Airlines in the Middle East ===
Israel's 1948 foundation created business for US airlines. Carriers like Alaska Airlines, Flying Tiger, Trans Caribbean and Transocean flew immigrant charters. Atlantic Northern Airlines carried arms. For Alaska Airlines, charters sidestepped restrictions of the Civil Aeronautics Board (CAB), the now-defunct Federal agency that at the time provided tight economic regulation of most US commercial aviation. The CAB limited Alaska Airlines scheduled service to specific routes within the Territory of Alaska; charters let the airline grow outside Alaska. In 1948, the American Jewish Joint Distribution Committee (JDC) relief agency contracted with Alaska Airlines to move Yemenite Jews from Aden to Israel. At that time, thousands of Jews from the Kingdom of Yemen (later known as North Yemen) subsisted south of the Kingdom at a refugee camp outside Aden in British-controlled Aden Colony by the mouth of the Red Sea (the colony together with adjacent British-controlled Aden Protectorate later became South Yemen; South and North Yemen united in 1990 to become today's Yemen). Egypt closed the Suez Canal to Israeli immigrants and Israel had, at the time, no Red Sea port, hence the need for an airlift.

The Aden operation was autonomous from the start. Alaska Airlines owner Raymond Marshall required Alaska president James A. Wooten to personally lease the necessary resources from the airline. Wooten incorporated NEATI in Delaware June 1949 with pilot Robert F. Maguire, Jr. as president, but kept it initially secret. The JDC saw Maguire (who Israeli leader David Ben Gurion reportedly called an Irish Moses) as the person most responsible for making the airlift a success. Conditions were challenging.

The 1948 Arab-Israeli war ended in 1949 armistices, but peace agreements did not follow. Thus, for the duration of the operation, the eight+ hour flight from Aden to Israel required flying over the Red Sea and narrow Gulf of Aqaba, with hostile powers on either side. Mountain ranges lined the Red Sea, some as high as 12,000 ft, higher than the cruising altitude of the unpressurized aircraft. Fuel was initially difficult to obtain in Israel, so flights had to refuel in Cyprus. The British in Aden separately refused to sell fuel. Southbound flights thus stopped in Asmara, Eritrea (then British administered) to load fuel drums for Aden, to self-supply return Tel Aviv flights. Asmara was Alaska's main base; it lost a Curtiss C-46 there in January 1949. Alaska loaded over 100 Yemenites (of slight stature, often malnourished and with many children) per flight on wooden benches, over double the usual capacity of a Douglas DC-4/C-54. Adult passenger weight averaged about 80 lbs. Passengers relieved themselves in a sandbox at the back of the aircraft; aircraft were sprayed out after each flight. Flights did not fly on the Jewish sabbath.

=== Transfer to NEATI ===
Alaska's involvement formally ended August 1949 when the CAB and its operational counterpart, the Civil Aeronautics Administration (CAA, forerunner to the Federal Aviation Administration) cracked down. The airline offered de-facto scheduled service (via frequent charters) between Alaska and the Lower 48, violating CAB rules and a prior court case. Alaska did not have the required CAA authority for offshore operations. It also had many safety violations. Fines and operating restrictions were severe. Wooten was also personally fined. The CAA/CAB issued the ruling on August 4 with the clamp-down effective August 8. NEAT officially assumed Alaska's duties August 7, 1949. Wooten's position with the CAA/CAB and Alaska Airlines was difficult; he claimed President Truman interceded with the government and on October 14 left Alaska to become chair of NEAT.

Although NEATI was initially just the continuation of an Alaska operation (some NEAT aircraft at first just used a simple variation of the Alaska livery (see External links for an example)), later in 1949 Alaska denied any connection to NEAT.

=== Operation Magic Carpet ===
The first phase of Magic Carpet, December 16, 1948, to March 1949, moved over 5,000 people. There was a lull and the Aden camp closed. But as word spread that the way was open to Israel, Yemenite Jews started walking to Aden. A new camp opened in July and was soon overwhelmed; population exceeded 13,000 by September. The JDC struggled to find sufficient lift. By September the Israeli military had contributed two aircraft to help clear the peak. Ultimately as many as 11 aircraft were employed, with Trans Caribbean, Seaboard and Western and Flying Tiger Line participating along with British carrier Fairflight. The peak month of the airlift was October 1949, when almost 11,500 were transported. Flights continued in 1950 at lower tempo through September 24. Contracting carriers used their own crews. NEAT was a major operation for Flying Tiger Line (FTL) which contributed four aircraft, its biggest non-military contract to that point. FTL founder and president Robert Prescott personally oversaw FTL's NEAT operation; some reports even identified him as head of NEAT.

Magic Carpet flew over 47,000 Yemenite Jews, encompassed flights from Asmara (200) and Djibouti (200) to Israel and also airlifted culturally distinct (from Yemenites) Jews from Aden itself (over 1,700) for a total of over 49,000 people. NEAT accounted for at least 38,000 (counting just September 1949 through September 1950).

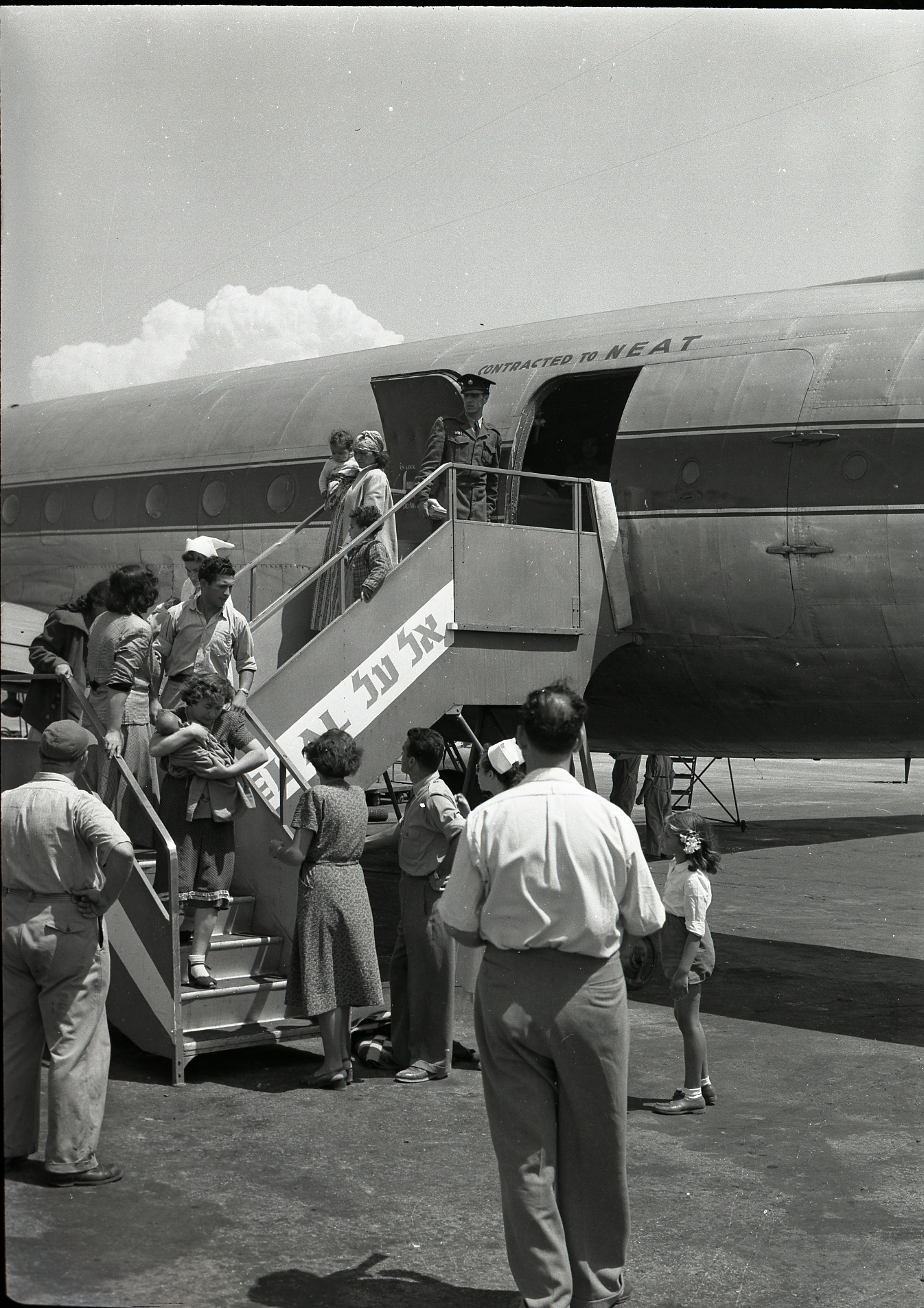
Iraqi arrivals Lod Airport, April 1951. Note "Contracted to NEAT" above the door

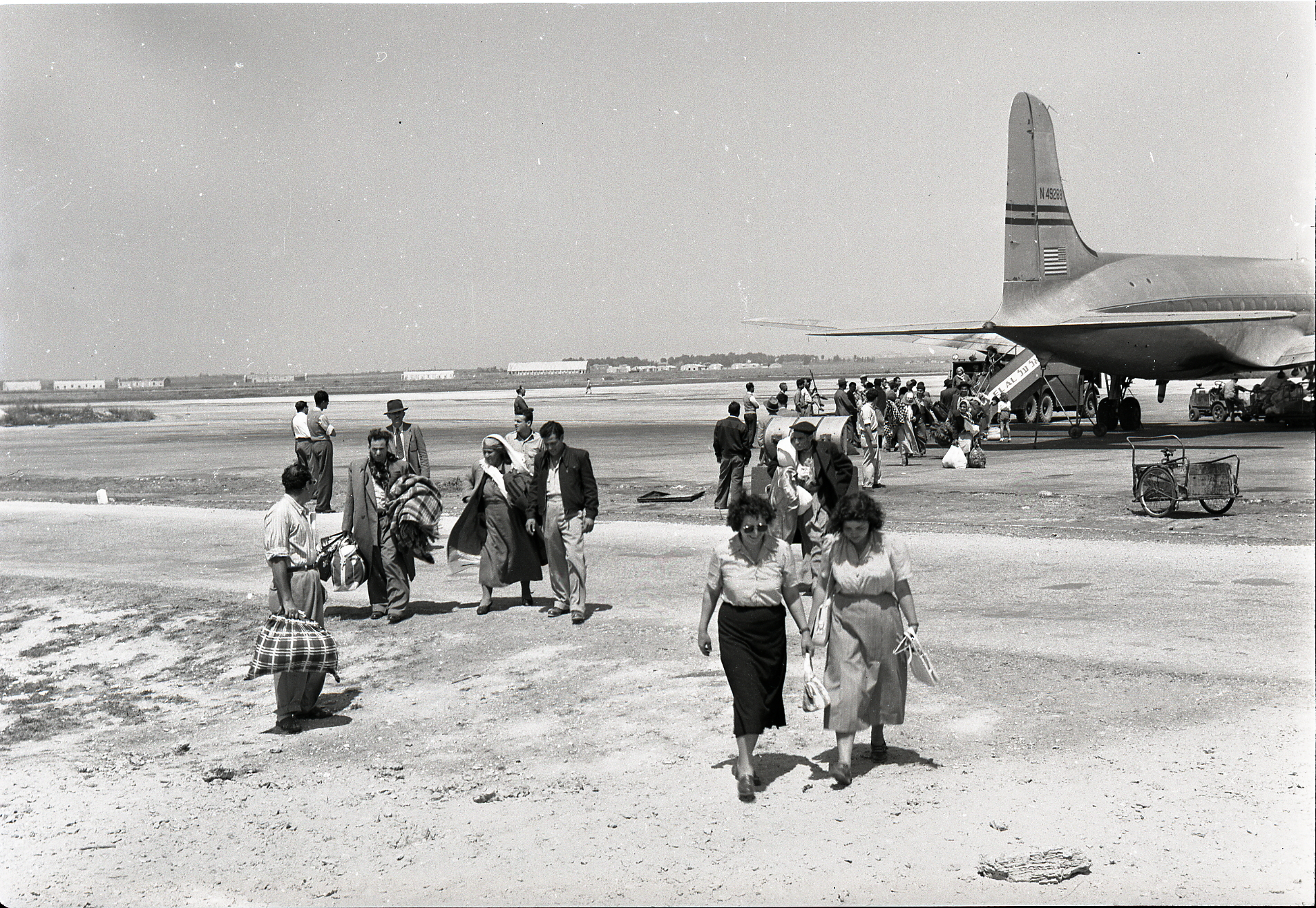
Same aircraft as prior photo; N49288 was a DC-4 registered to Transocean

=== Operation Ezra and Nehemiah ===
El Al was not operational when Operation Magic Carpet launched but it was by 1950. NEATO was a Wooten/El Al venture, formed for the purposes of the Iraqi operation, distinct from NEATI and incorporated in Delaware February 1950, (NEATO was not an airline; US law strictly limited foreign ownership of a US airline and, as discussed below, El Al came to own all of NEATO). NEATI gave El Al right of first refusal on all Jewish migration business, whether from the Israeli government or Zionist or Jewish organizations. Unlike in British-controlled Aden, Israel could only operate in Iraq under cover, which it did through Mossad LeAliyah Bet (MAB), a clandestine agency created to enable Jewish immigration to Mandatory Palestine when such immigration was illegal. MAB, disbanded in 1952, should not be confused with today's Mossad. In May 1950, two MAB agents, one also a NEAT employee, the other posing as one, along with (fully aware) Wooten, negotiated a year-long agreement with Iraq for the US company to fly Iraqi Jews to Israel, known as Operation Ali Baba at the time.

Flights started May 19, 1950 with a stop in Nicosia, Cyprus, to meet an Iraqi condition that flights fly to a neutral country. As in Aden, NEAT faced unexpected overwhelming demand. Israeli ministers, struggling with the immigrants they already had, initially blocked an increase in NEAT capacity, despite the poor condition of refugees in Iraq. In January 1951 Ben Gurion ordered a substantial increase to clear the backlog. The fleet expanded (see next paragraph) and aircraft more productive because (1) in March, Iraq allowed direct flights, substantially reducing trip time and (2) rabbis ruled NEAT could operate on the sabbath, so long as aircraft did not arrive in Israel during that time. Transocean also contributed an aircraft and crew (see photo). In March, NEAT flew over 13,000 migrants, up from fewer than 4,000 in December. In April, the number was over 21,000. NEAT obtained an extension of the program beyond its original one-year term to clear the backlog. By the time the Jewish Agency announced an end to the program on August 5, NEAT had flown over 112,000 people from Baghdad and Basra to Israel.

=== Intercontinental Aerea de Cuba ===
At least three DC-4s of the aircraft added to Operation Ezra and Nehemiah in early 1951 had Cuban registration. A Cuban businessman, Narciso V. Roselló Otero, established an airline, Intercontinental Aerea de Cuba, with a branch in Nicosia. Israeli aircraft were given Cuban registration and Cuban pilots flew some such aircraft for NEAT, which also included C-46s (see nearby photo of a Cuban-registered NEAT C-46). British authorities in Sharjah (then a UK protectorate) noted the Cuban registration of a NEAT aircraft transiting that Emirate from Hong Kong. In later years the strategem was openly acknowledged.

=== Aerovias Venezuela Europa ===
In 1950, NEAT and Flying Tiger each sold a DC-4 to a Venezuelan carrier, Aerovias Venezuela Europa (AVE) "on an installment plan." AVE was the international division of Compania Aerea Viajes Expresos de Venezuela (CAVE). NEAT and Flying Tiger shared a 45% stake in AVE. Wooten was also an AVE executive and chair of the board. In 1950 AVE offered scheduled service from Caracas to Rome and Paris (via Bermuda, the Azores, Portugal and Spain), and also flew pilgrimage charters to Tel Aviv from Europe. (External links has a photo of an AVE DC-4 at Tel Aviv). By 1951 the arrangement had come to an end.

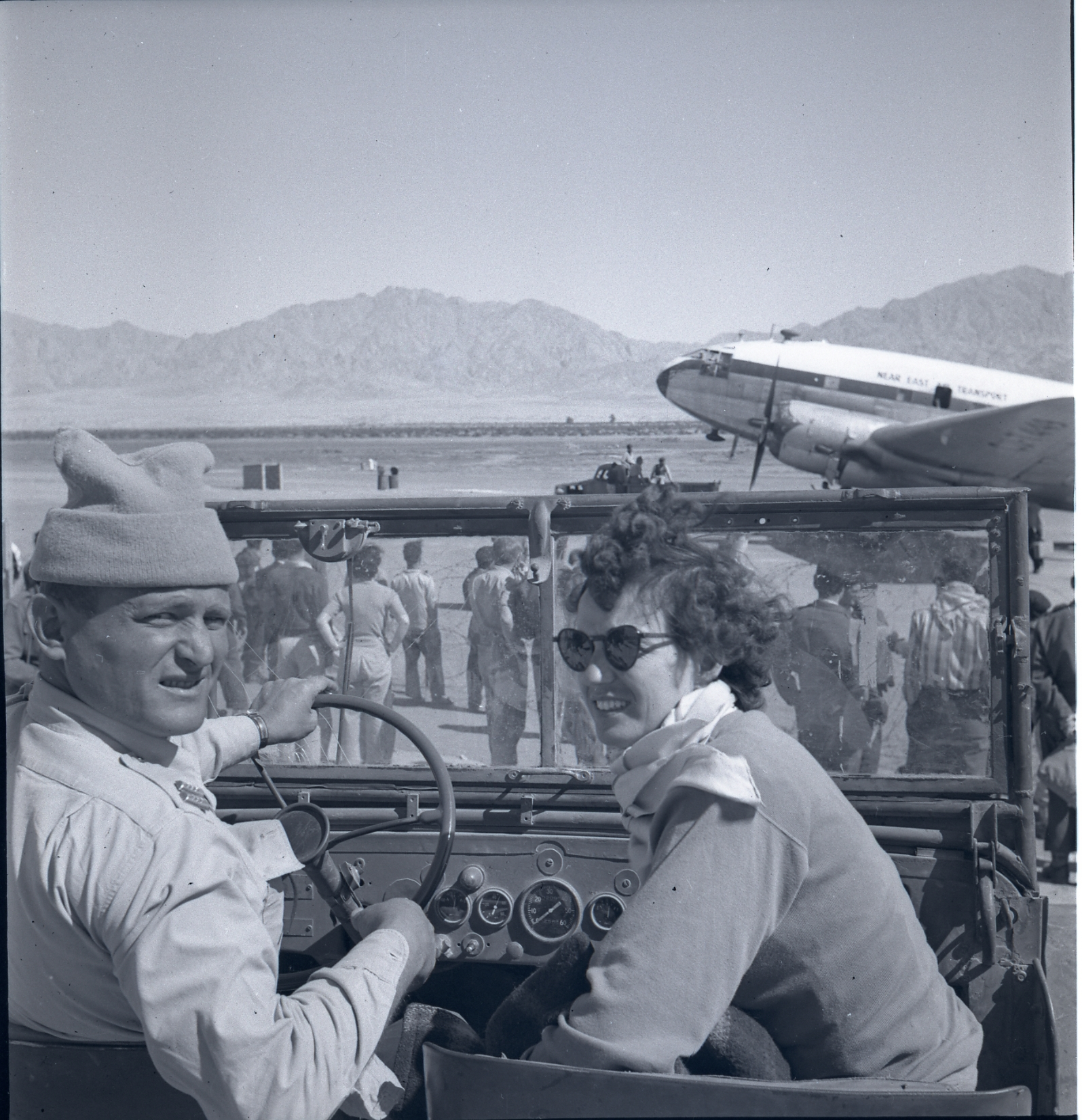
Cuban registration (on wing) CU-T449 indicate this NEAT C-46 (at Umm Rashrash 1950) was an Intercontinental Aerea de Cuba aircraft. CU-T449 appears in C-46 ownership records

=== Other activity ===
A former NEAT flight attendant was based in Nicosia and flew to 31 other countries. There was other Israel migration business, including from Bahrain, Bombay and as previously mentioned, Hong Kong (extracting Jewish refugees from the Chinese revolution). In late 1951 NEAT was flying 2000 to 3000 people per month to Israel from Tehran.

There was also non-refugee business. In 1950, NEAT carried pilgrims traveling from Tehran to Mecca. In 1950, Wooten announced a NEAT program transporting Christian pilgrims from Europe to Israel. As noted above, NEAT's Venezuelan affiliate, AVE, appears to have played a role in that program.

=== End ===
By early 1951, El Al took Wooten out of his NEATO stake completely. In the same timeframe, Milton Lang was named NEAT president in 1951; he would later transition to being an El Al executive. In September, Wooten became the new head of the scheduled American cargo airline U. S. Airlines. NEAT flew its last migrant mission in November and by January 1952, all staff were on unpaid leave. Migration to Israel dropped sharply after 1951.

== See also ==
- List of defunct airlines of the United States
- Alaska Airlines
- El Al
- Flying Tiger Line
- Transocean Air Lines
- Operation Magic Carpet
- Operation Ezra and Nehemiah
- American Jewish Joint Distribution Committee
- Mossad LeAliyah Bet
- James Wooten
