= Mercer Airlines =

US intrastate and contract airline (1950s–1978)

Mercer Enterprises dba Mercer Airlines Pacific American Airlines
IATA	ICAO	Call sign
—	MER; PAF	MERCER; PAC-ALPHA
- Commenced operations: 1950s
- Ceased operations: January 1978
- Fleet size: See Fleet below
- Destinations: See Destinations below
- Headquarters: Burbank, California, United States
- Founder: D.W. Mercer

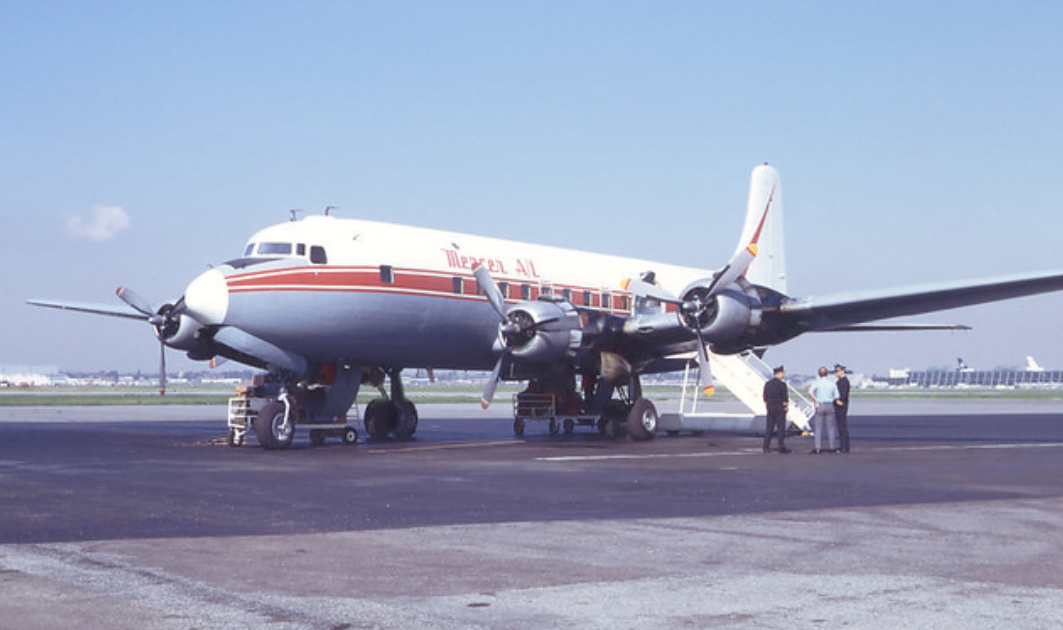
DC-6 Long Beach 1973. In 1976 this aircraft crashed on a golf course short of Van Nuys Airport killing all three cockpit crew. External links has photos of a Pacific American DC-6 and a Mercer DC-3

Airplane Charter by Mercer Associated Airways
- Commenced operations: 1945
- Ceased operations: 28 April 1951
- Fleet size: See Fleet below
- Headquarters: Burbank, California, United States
- Founder: D.W. Mercer

In the mid-20th century, Dwight W. "Poddy" Mercer established at least four airlines in the Los Angeles area:

- Irregular air carrier Airplane Charter By Mercer (later known as Associated Airways (1945–1951), not to be confused with Associated Air Transport or Air Transport Associates)
- Intrastate airline California Pacific Airlines (1950)
- Intrastate airline Golden State Airlines (1951)
- Intrastate and uncertificated carrier Mercer Enterprises dba Mercer Airlines which became active in the late 1950s. Under new ownership this became Pacific American Airlines in 1975 until it collapsed in early 1978.

== History ==
=== Poddy Mercer ===
Poddy Mercer was a former South Dakota auto dealer who moved to the Los Angeles area during World War II and became an instructor pilot at Cal-Aero Academy. He flew a P-38 in the 1946 Bendix Trophy race. Mercer's post-war career was involved in aviation enterprises. He established at least four airlines.

=== Airplane Charter by Mercer/Associated Airways ===
From October 1945, Mercer was advertising charters from Burbank Airport under the name Airplane Charter By Mercer, under which name he incorporated in California on 20 February 1946. On 28 March 1949, the airline changed its name to Associated Airways, Inc. Among other things, the airline offered transcontinental and Hawaii service. However, the airline got on the wrong side of the Civil Aeronautics Board (CAB), the now-defunct federal agency that, at the time, tightly regulated almost all US commercial air transport.

Mercer claimed he had sold Associated in 1950, but was unable to produce proof of this to the CAB. Associated was clearly, at times, under the influence of the partners in North American Airlines Group, a so-called combine (several irregular air carriers under common control illegally engaging in frequent scheduled service, something at the time reserved for scheduled airlines). Further, some Associated flights were Flying Tiger Line using Associated's name to fly passenger air service, which the CAB was also unhappy about. The Civil Aeronautics Board (CAB) shut down Associated as of 28 April 1951.

=== Early 1950s intrastate carriers: California Pacific and Golden State Airlines ===
In 1950, Mercer operated California Pacific Airlines, one of eight California intrastate airlines that started up in a 13-month period from January 1949 to January 1950, six of which (like California Pacific) ceased operation after a short time. The exceptions were California Central Airlines, which lasted until 1955, and Pacific Southwest Airlines, which ultimately went on to great success. California Pacific operated January to February 1950.

In November 1951 Mercer started Golden State Airlines, another intrastate airline, which offered service between Los Angeles and Sacramento. This airline immediately suffered a crash, non-fatal but the Lockheed L-10 Electra aircraft was destroyed (see Accidents). The CAB, which investigated this crash, said it was being flown by Air California, an air taxi service owned by Mercer (no relation to the later 1960s/1970s intrastate jet carrier of the same name), an indication that Golden State was, at least at that time, a dba for Air California. A year later, Golden State changed to flying from Burbank to the California Central Coast. Despite the fact that William A. Jordan interviewed Mercer, there is no mention of Golden State in Jordan's 1970 academic book on California intrastate carriers, which otherwise covers this period in significant detail.

=== Mercer Enterprises/Mercer Airlines ===
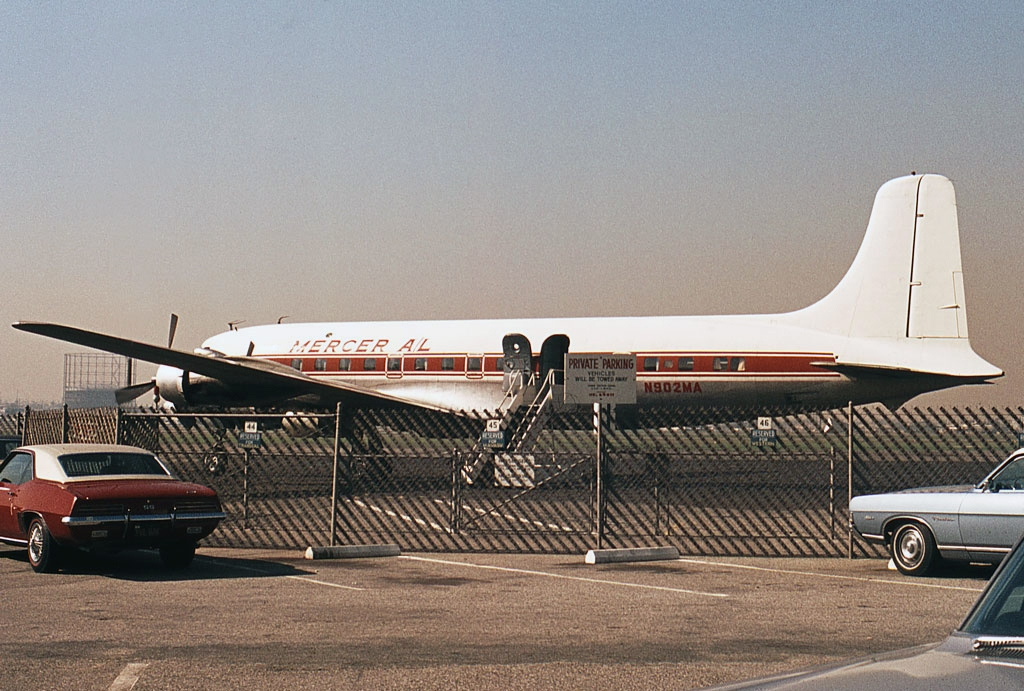
DC-6 Long Beach Airport 1970

In the late 1950s, Mercer was flying passengers to Del Mar racetrack in North County San Diego from Burbank with Mercer Enterprises. From April 1964, Mercer Enterprises flew scheduled weekend service from Burbank to San Diego Brown Field, suspended in 1971. In 1969, Mercer Enterprises transferred its intrastate economic certificate, conferred on it by the California Public Utilities Commission (CPUC), to a corporate entity, it having been a sole proprietorship to that point. Mercer Airlines was a dba of Mercer Enterprises.

In the second half of the 1960s, Mercer Enterprises secured a US Navy contract to fly from Naval Air Station Point Mugu to San Nicolas Island. It also flew from Long Beach to San Clemente Island.

Mercer Airlines functioned either as an intrastate airline or an uncertificated carrier, the common thread being that neither was regulated by the CAB. The CAB saw Mercer as unsuitable. He was the subject of a 1959 CAB cease-and-desist case, wherein another irregular carrier, California Air Charter, was revoked for, among other violations, flying excessive scheduled frequencies while under the management of Mercer in the 1956–1957, such violations being "wilfull and knowing".

=== Pacific American Airlines ===
On 26 March 1975, Poddy Mercer sold Mercer Enterprises to a new group that operated the airline as Pacific American Airlines as an uncertificated carrier. However, the airline was still operating under the Mercer identity when, in February 1976, it suffered a high profile crash of a DC-6 at a golf course in Van Nuys, California on approach to the airport with the death of all three cockpit crew (see Accidents).

Notable Pacific American activities included a contract with the Kirimati (then known as Gilbert Islands) government to fly from Honolulu to Christmas Island (known today as Kiritimati Island) to Tarawa with a DC-6. The airline also flew contract freight within the Hawaiian Islands. External links has a photo of a Pacific American DC-6 at Honolulu. The airline also leased a BAC 1-11 January–July 1977, which it was supposed to fly on behalf of corporations. The company ceased operations in January 1978. The FAA Statistical Handbook of Aviation, Calendar Year 1978 no longer lists the company as of 31 December 1978.

== Destinations ==
=== Mercer Airlines ===
Between 1964 and 1971:

- Burbank
- San Diego (Brown Field)

== Fleet ==
=== Airplane Charter By Mercer ===
Per 1949 Jane's All the World's Aircraft:

- 1 Douglas DC-3
- 2 Douglas DC-4

=== Mercer Enterprises/Pacific American Airlines ===
31 December 1965:

- 1 Douglas DC-2
- 2 Douglas DC-3

31 December 1974:

- 2 Douglas DC-3
- 4 Douglas DC-6

31 December 1976:

- 4 Douglas DC-6

31 December 1977:

- 2 Douglas DC-6

As previously noted, Pacific American had a BAC 1-11 jet in the fleet from January–July 1977.

== Accidents and incidents ==
- 8 December 1951: An Air California Lockheed L-10 Electra, operating as Golden State Airlines, was en-route from Burbank to Camp Stoneman (Pittsburg, California) when the pilot elected to land at San Jose to address a low fuel warning on the right engine. The right and then left engines cut out before landing, the aircraft crash into trees and while the pilot and dozen passengers all survived, the aircraft was destroyed.
- 4 August 1972: A Mercer Airlines Douglas DC-3, registration N31538, suffered an in-flight engine fire shortly after takeoff from Naval Air Station Point Mugu on a repositioning flight to Hollywood-Burbank Airport. The aircraft departed the runway in the emergency landing and was severely damaged by the subsequent fire. All three people on board survived.
- 8 February 1976: Mercer Airlines Flight 901 DC-6 (original prototype YC-112A) N901MA, lost a propeller blade on engine 3 after takeoff from Burbank Airport due to fatigue. The resulting imbalance tore the engine from its mount. The blade passed through the fuselage, severing pneumatic, hydraulic and emergency airbrake lines and wiring for propeller controls and some engine instruments, before striking no. 2 engine, disabling an oil pump and causing it to fill with oil. The crew tried to land at Burbank, taking off again when it found it had no way to stop. The captain elected to try longer, uphill Runway 34L at Van Nuys but put the aircraft down on a golf course after loss of power from No. 2 engine, missing No. 3 engine and drag from drooping landing gear and flaps. The aircraft struck a 24-inch (61 cm) concrete foundation, jamming the gear assembly into the cockpit. The three cockpit crew members perished, but two flight attendants and a baggage handler in the cabin survived.

== See also ==
- Intrastate airline
- Uncertificated carrier
- Irregular air carrier
- List of defunct airlines of the United States
