= Jim Wooten =

Jim Wooten may refer to:

- Jim Wooten (journalist) (1937–2026), American journalist
- Jim Wooten (politician) (born 1941), American politician

== See also ==
- James Wooten (1913–1985), American transportation businessman
