= Flight 897 =

Flight 897 may refer to

- Standard Air Lines Flight 897R, crashed on 12 July 1949
- Viasa Flight 897, crashed on 30 May 1961
