= James Wooten =

American aviation entrepreneur (1913–1985)

James A. Wooten
- Wooten, c. 1947
- Born: October 15, 1913
- Died: May 31, 1985 (aged 71); Orlando, Florida, U.S.
- Occupations: Aviation and transport executive
- Known for: Scheduled air freight pioneer President Alaska Airlines (1947–1949); Operation Magic Carpet; Near East Air Transport; Operation Ezra and Nehemiah

James A. Wooten (October 15, 1913 – May 31, 1985) was an American transportation and aviation entrepreneur. After an early career in trucking, he pioneered the first scheduled air freight ever at American Airlines before serving as president of Alaska Airlines during a period of rapid growth following World War II. In that role he initiated Operation Magic Carpet, the 1948–1950 airlift that carried tens of thousands of Yemenite Jews from Aden to the new state of Israel. Wooten completed Magic Carpet with his own charter carrier Near East Air Transport (NEAT), after regulatory issues forced him from Alaska Airlines in 1949. Wooten and NEAT went on to fly an even larger 1950–1951 airlift from Iraq to Israel in Operation Ezra and Nehemiah, in which capacity Wooten cooperated with agents from the Israeli clandestine service Mossad LeAliyah Bet to make necessary arrangements. The two airlifts together carried at least 160,000 migrants to Israel. Wooten then became head of the all-cargo airline U. S. Airlines.

A lifelong Baptist, Wooten received a commendation from Israeli Prime Minister David Ben-Gurion for his work on behalf of Jewish refugees.

== American Airlines ==
After eleven years in the trucking business, Wooten joined American Airlines in 1943, becoming traffic manager for air freight in 1944. In October 1944, Wooten launched the first scheduled air freight service ever, rolling out American Airlines service between 43 cities, marked by shipping the first full aircraft load of scheduled freight, 5000 lbs of spinach for Kroger, from Los Angeles to Cincinnati in September. In 1946 Wooten became general manager of a new Contract Air Cargo Division at American. But the plane-load freight division was shuttered less than a year later in May 1947, unable to achieve sufficient utilization of its seven Douglas DC-4 freighters.

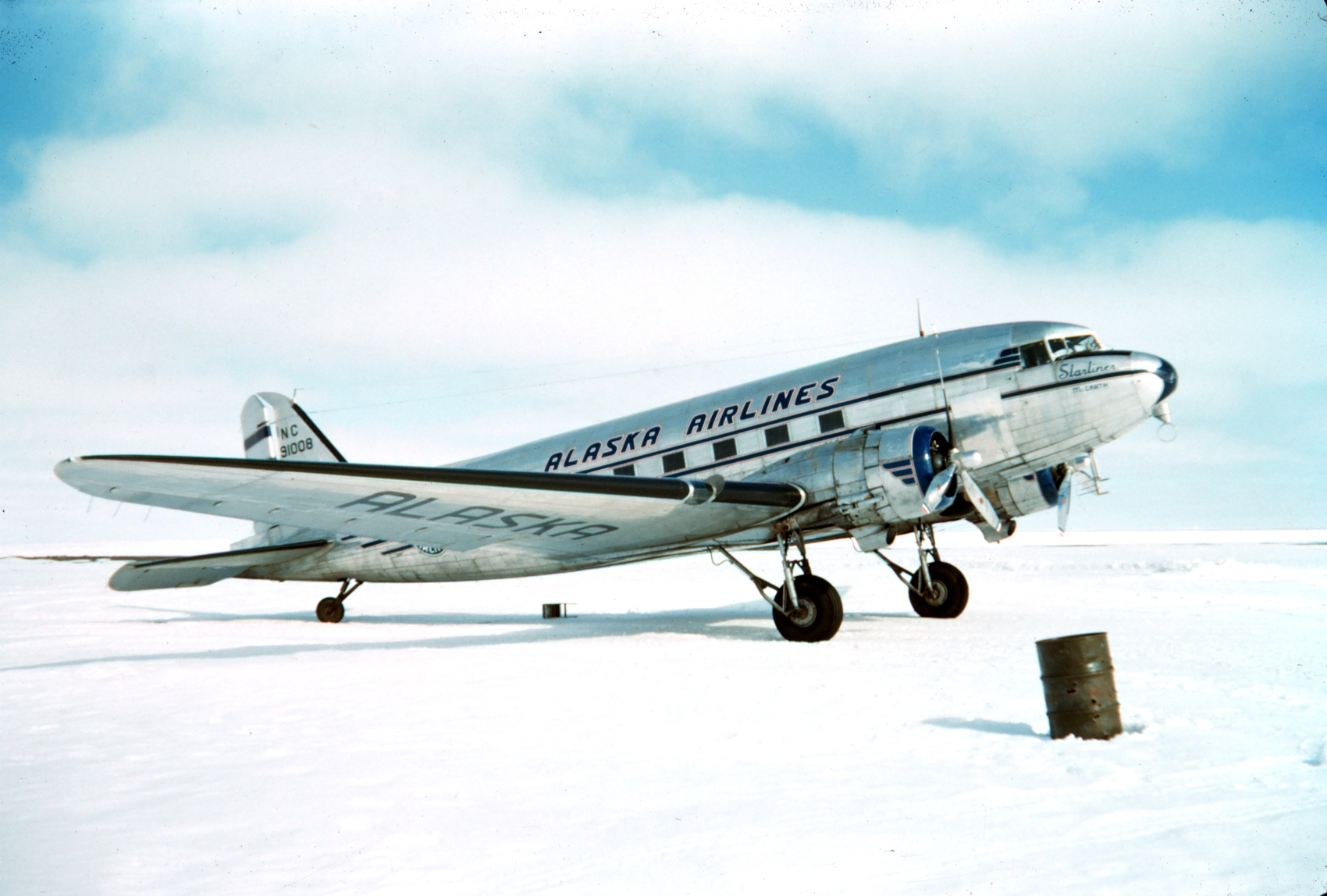
DC-3 from Wooten era, Spring 1949

== Alaska Airlines ==
In June 1947, Alaska Airlines, then a small carrier based in Anchorage, named Wooten its president. Wooten oversaw an immediate, and profitable, increase in the company's nonscheduled business, dwarfing the carrier's modest scheduled operations. Alaska flew charter flights between Alaska and the Lower 48 as well as globally, much of it freight. The airline acquired surplus United States military transport aircraft, including Douglas DC-3s, DC-4s and C-46s, and took part in the Berlin Airlift.

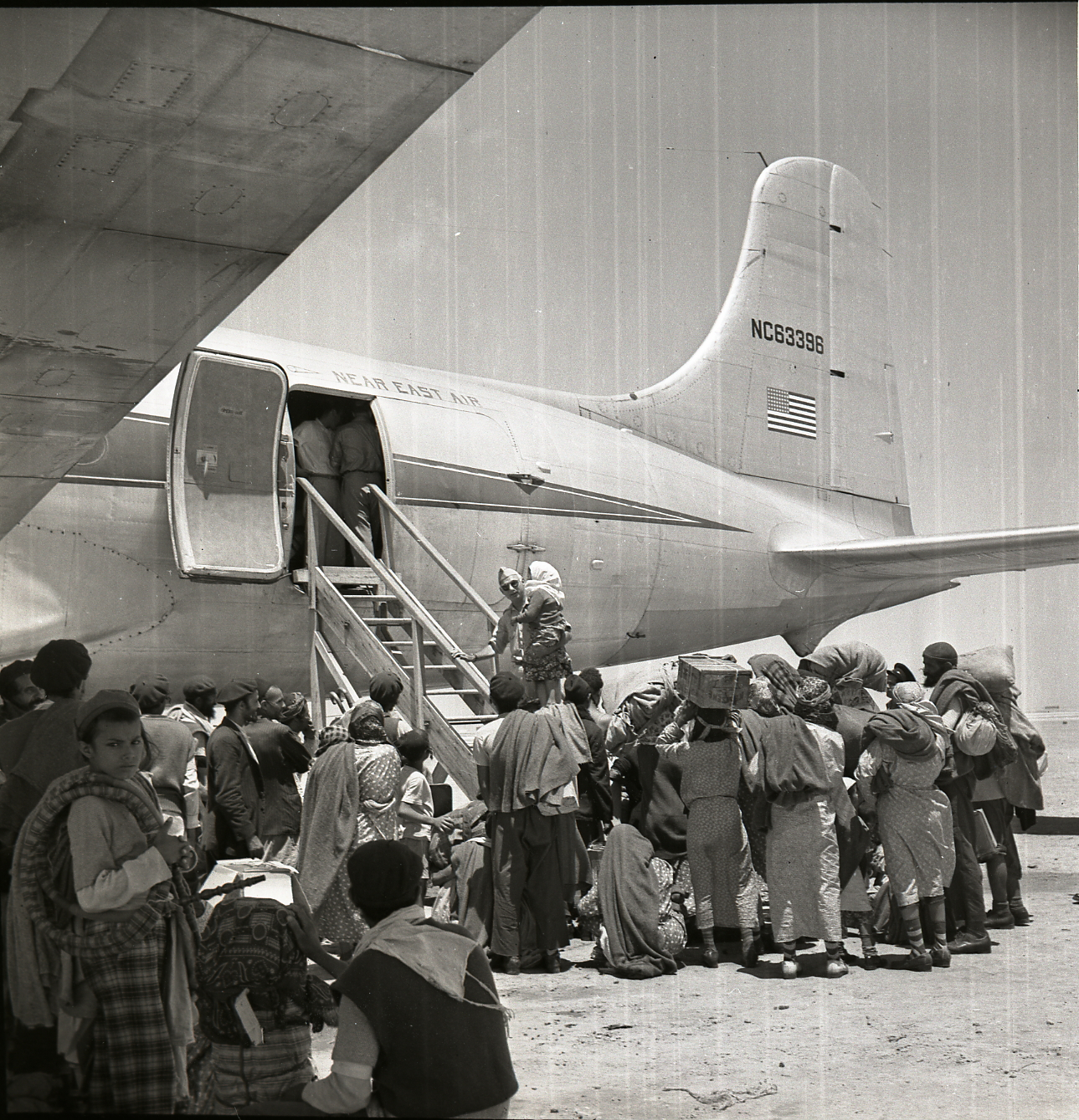
Douglas DC-4 boarding at Aden Airport, Operation Magic Carpet, 1950. Note "Near East Air" over the door.

== Operation Magic Carpet ==
As president of Alaska Airlines, Wooten initiated Operation Magic Carpet, the airlift of Yemenite Jews from Aden to Israel between 16 December 1948 and 24 September 1950. Alaska Airlines established a base in Asmara, Ethiopia, from which it flew DC-4s and C-46s under contract to the American Jewish Joint Distribution Committee (JDC) relief agency. See External links for an excerpt of a JDC film that shows Alaska Airlines DC-4 and C-46 aircraft operating for Magic Carpet.

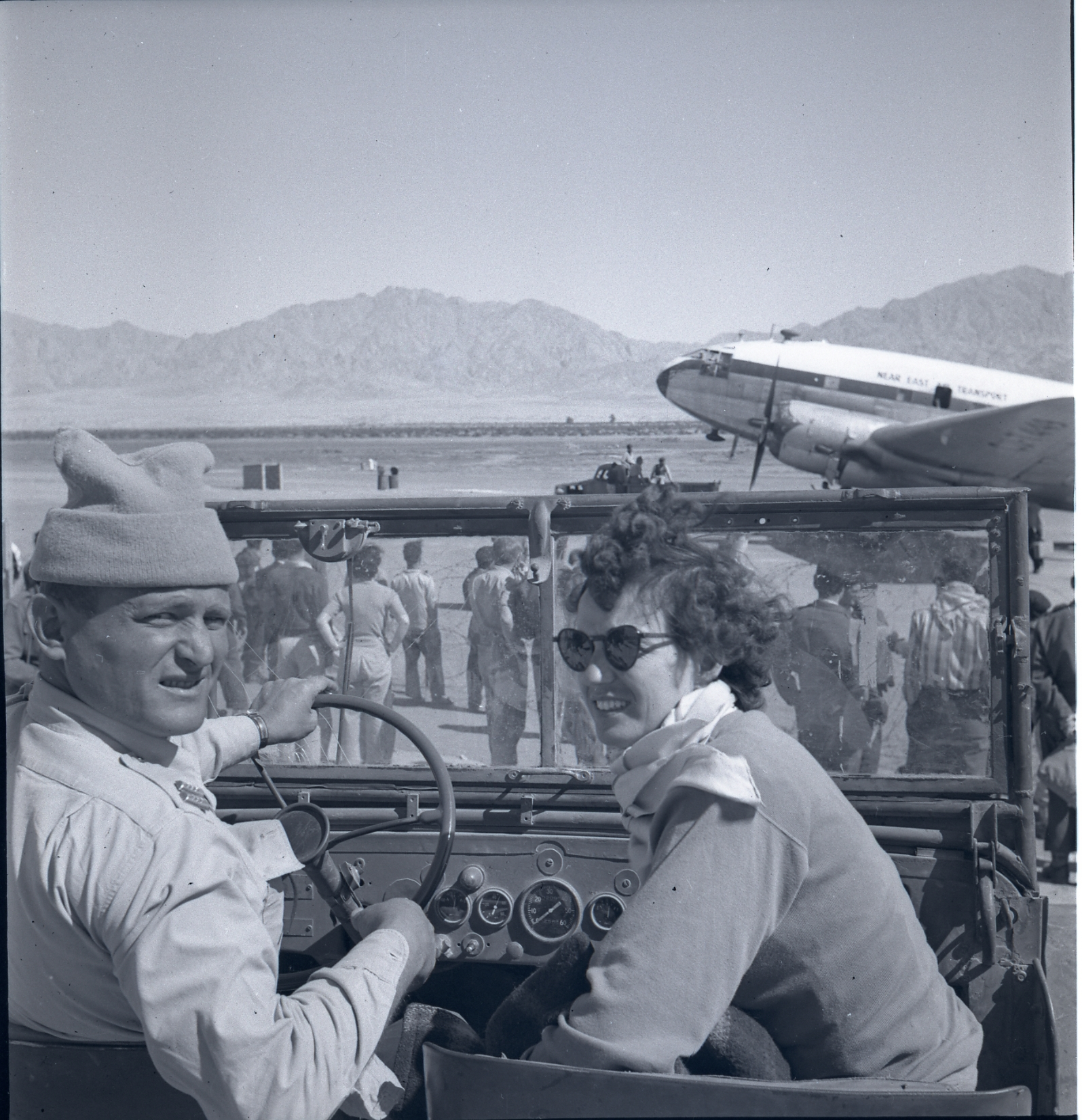
NEAT C-46 at Umm Rashrash (now known as Eilat) 1950 in Israel

== Near East Air Transport ==
Extensive nonscheduled operations got Alaska Airlines in trouble with the Civil Aeronautics Board (a now-defunct Federal agency that, at the time, provided tight economic regulation of most US commercial air transport) and the Civil Aeronautics Administration, which oversaw airline safety (predecessor to the Federal Aviation Administration). These agencies cracked down in August 1949, levying severe fines, including on Wooten himself. Operation Magic Carpet flying transferred to Wooten-owned Near East Air Transport (NEAT), an Alaska Airlines spinoff. He resigned from Alaska Airlines in October to focus on NEAT. Under Wooten's direction, Alaska Airlines and NEAT between them carried at least 49,000 migrants to Israel in Operation Magic Carpet, including smaller numbers of migrants from Djibouti, Asmara and Aden itself.

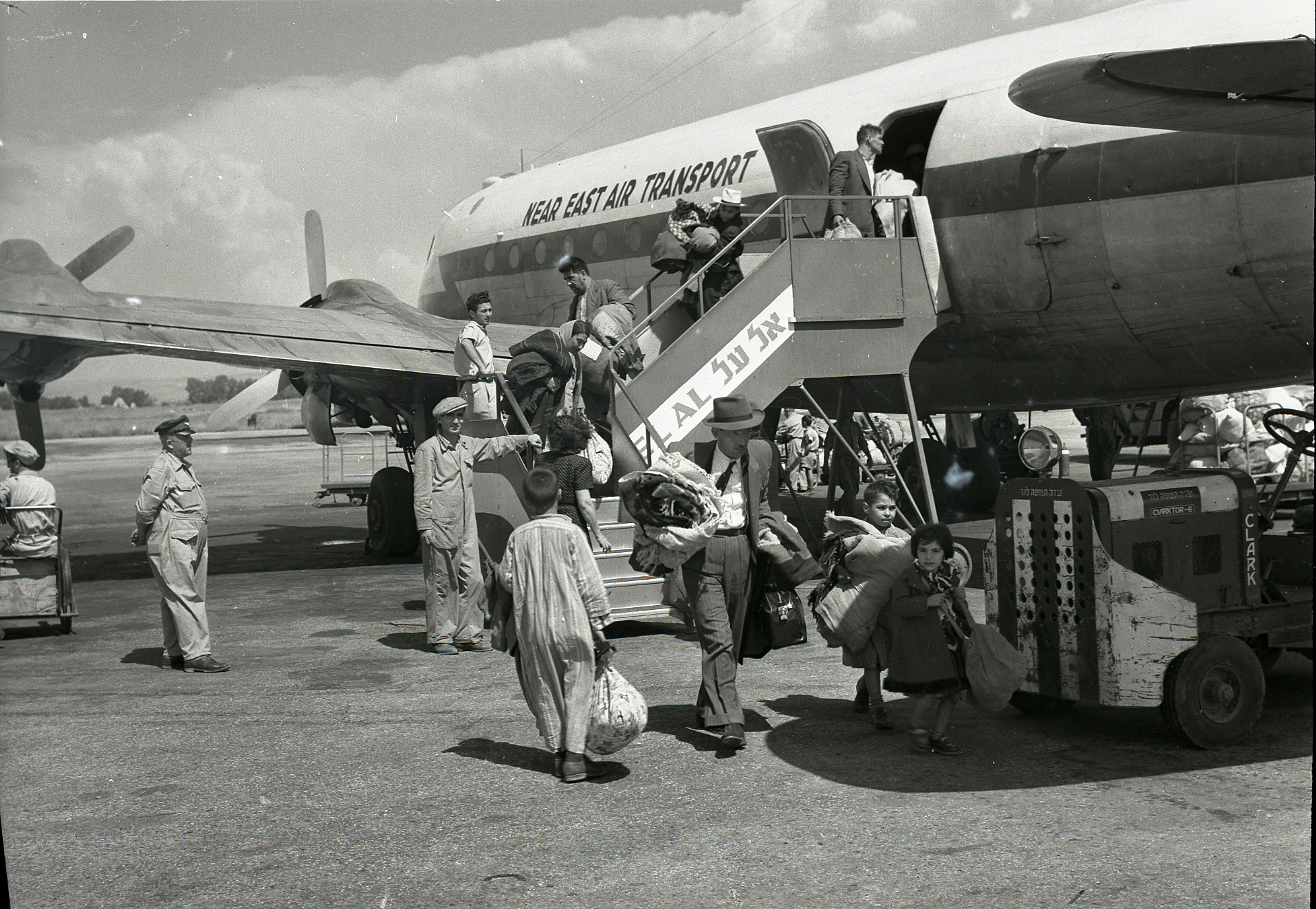
Iraqi migrants deplane a DC-4 in Tel Aviv 1951

== Operation Ezra and Nehemiah ==
In May 1950, NEAT undertook another major airlift, this time of Iraqi Jews to Israel. Wooten made contractual arrangements with the Iraqi government along with two agents of Mossad LeAliyah Bet, a clandestine agency focused on Jewish immigration to Israel. One agent was a NEAT officer, the other posed as one. NEAT flew over 112,000 Iraqi Jews to Israel through August 1951. By the end of the program, NEAT transitioned to the full control of the new Israeli airline, El Al.

== Other aviation activities ==
In September 1951, Wooten was named to head the scheduled U.S. air freight carrier U. S. Airlines. Wooten was also an officer and chairman of the board of Aerovias Venezuela Europa, a scheduled Venezuelan carrier that in 1950 offered service to Paris and Rome and also flew charters from Europe to Israel. He was also the head of Arabian American Airlines and Pilgrimage Air Transport.

== Death ==
In his later years, with his health declining, he concentrated on business investments. Wooten died at his home in Orlando, Florida, on May 31, 1985, at the age of 71.

== See also ==
- Alaska Airlines
- Near East Air Transport
- Operation Magic Carpet
- Operation Ezra and Nehemiah
