= Standard Air Lines Flight 897R =

1949 aviation accident in California, US

Coordinates: 34.2583°N 118.6375°W

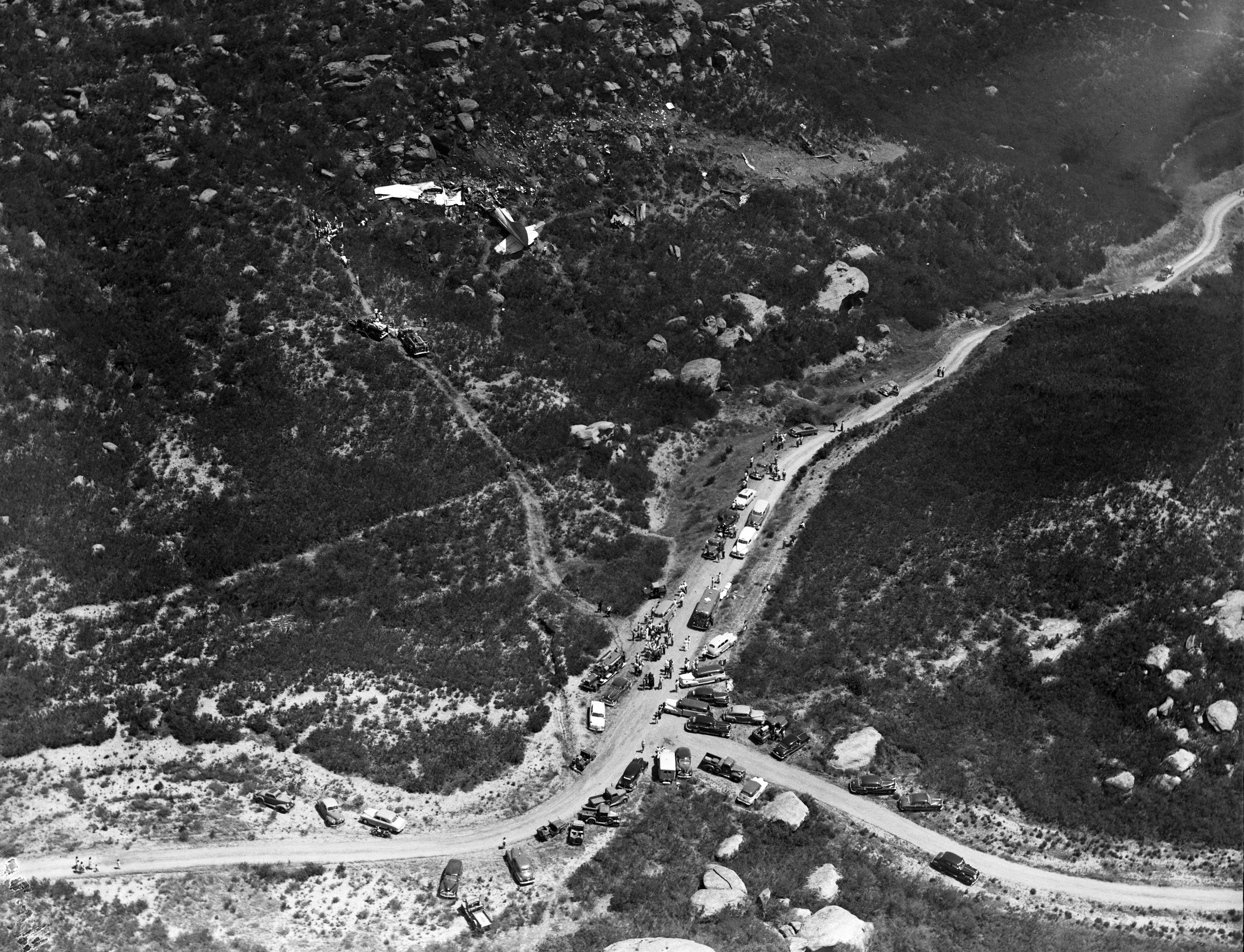
- Aerial photo of the crash (visible upper center) with rescue operations in progress

Accident
- Date: July 12, 1949
- Summary: Pilot error, CFIT
- Site: Chatsworth, California, United States

Aircraft
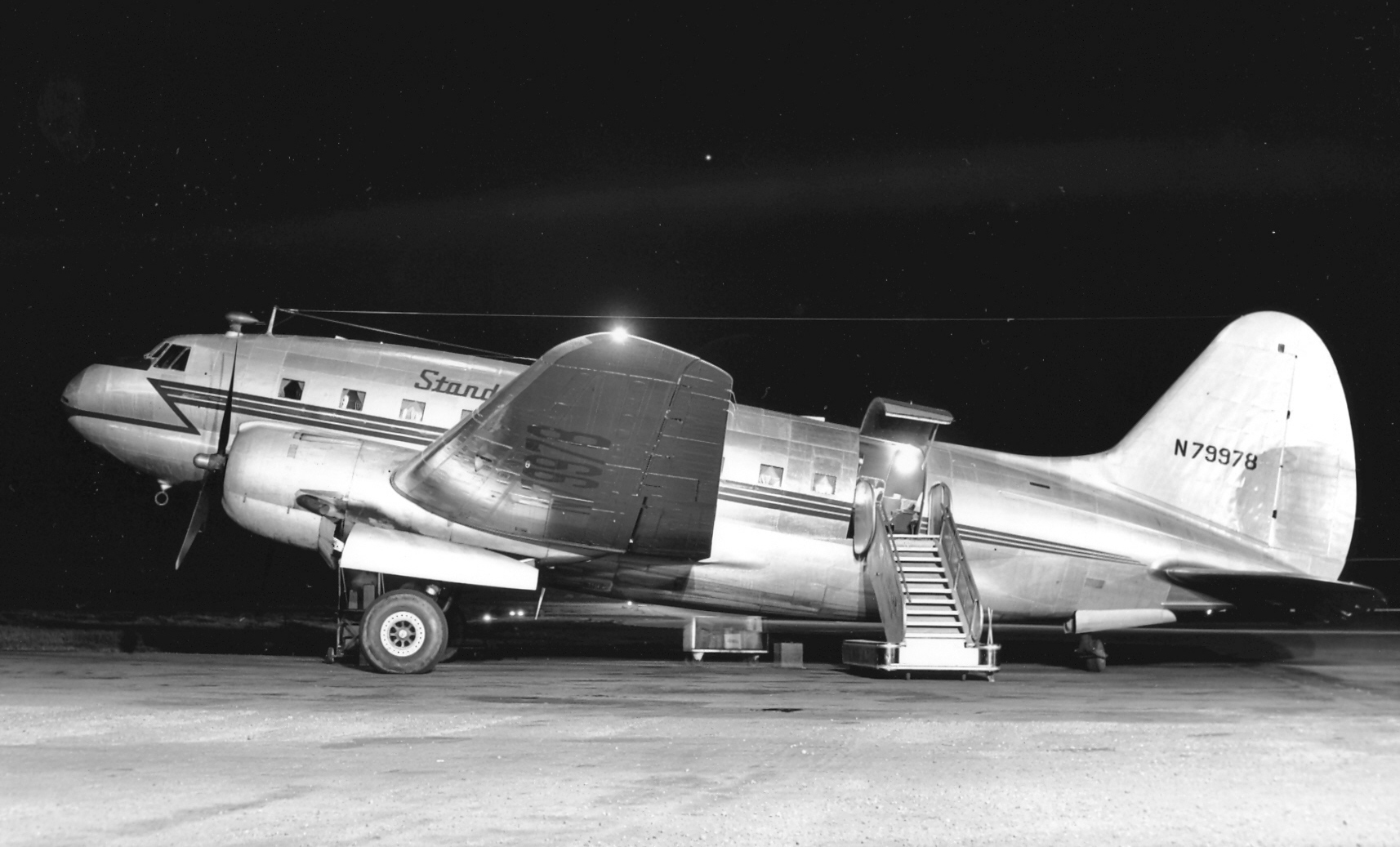
- N79978, the aircraft involved in the accident
- Aircraft type: Curtiss C-46E Commando
- Operator: Standard Air Lines
- Registration: N79978
- Flight origin: Albuquerque Municipal Airport
- Destination: Burbank Airport
- Passengers: 44
- Crew: 4
- Fatalities: 35
- Survivors: 13

Standard Air Lines Flight 897R was a domestic passenger flight between Albuquerque, New Mexico and Burbank, California. At 7:43am on July 12, 1949, the flight, operated by a Curtiss C-46E (registered N79978), crashed in Chatsworth, California, upon approach to Burbank, killing 35 of the 48 passengers and crew on board.

== The airline ==
Standard Air Lines was an irregular air carrier, a hybrid charter/scheduled airline of the day. It operated scheduled flights from New York to Los Angeles in violation of Civil Aeronautics Board (CAB) regulations, the CAB being in control of the US airline industry at the time. The CAB had already ordered the airline to cease operations. It was within a week or so of its final day.

== The flight ==
The Standard Air Lines aircraft was on a multi-stop flight from New York to Long Beach, California, via Chicago, Kansas City, Albuquerque and Burbank. It departed on the penultimate segment from Albuquerque Municipal Airport at 4:24am for a flight to the Lockheed Air Terminal in Burbank, California (today called Burbank Airport). At 7:36am the aircraft was cleared to land at Burbank. After that, there was no other communication from the flight.

== Crash ==
The aircraft was flying in level flight with the gear down, on an ILS approach to Hollywood-Lockheed Air Terminal (today called Burbank Airport) on a Tuesday morning. The aircraft descended in patchy fog below the minimum altitude permitted and its right wing tip struck the side of a hill at 1,890 feet above sea level, pulling the plane around 90 degrees. The C-46 hit the ground and bounced 300 feet into the air before crashing in Chatsworth, CA, some 430 feet below the crest of Santa Susana Pass, just north of the Chatsworth Reservoir.

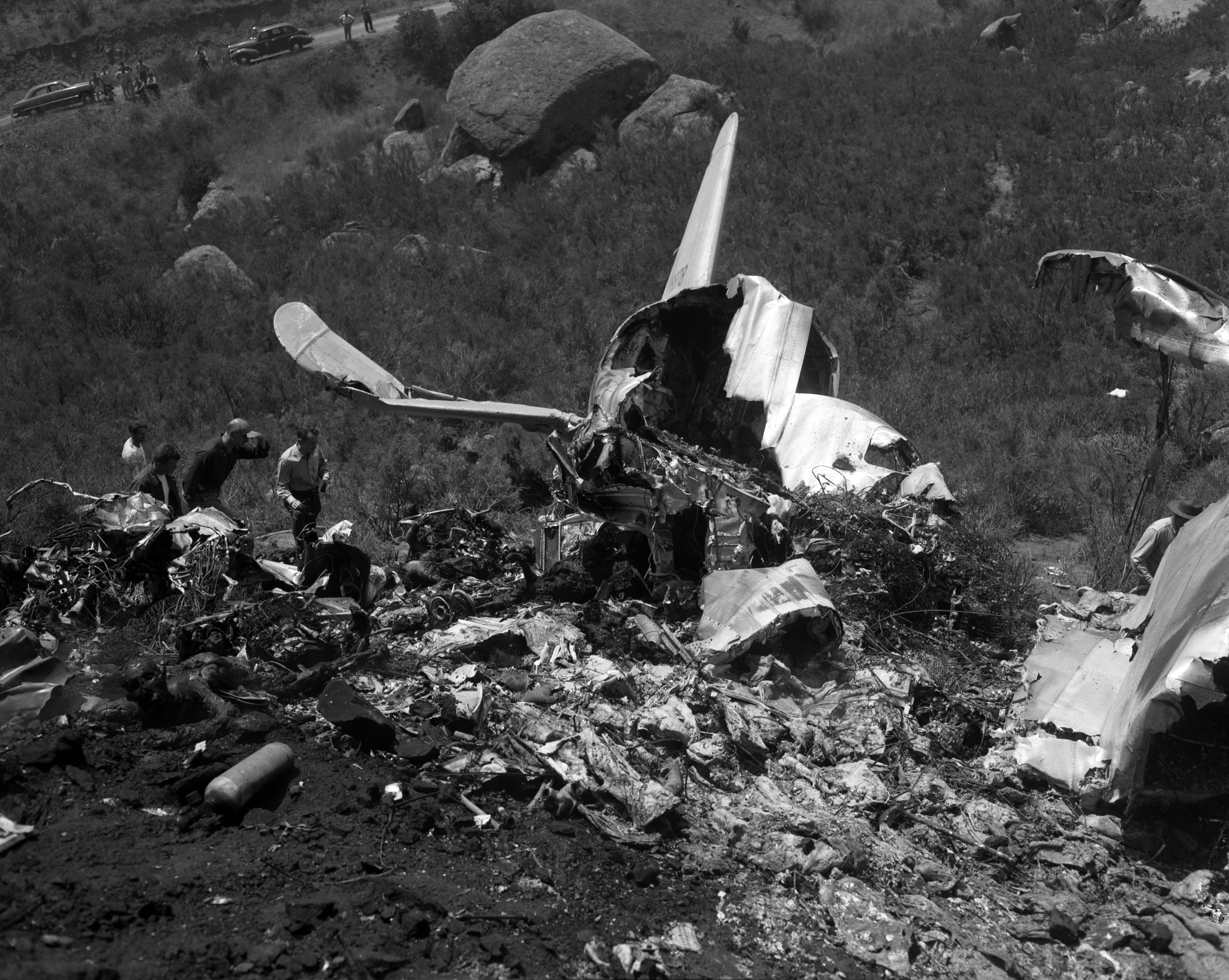
Tail section after crash

It was originally reported that a fist fight had broken out between two male passengers, however survivors later stated that the fight was not the cause of the crash but instead it was based on pilot error. The CAB report stated, "This accident was caused solely by the pilot voluntarily going below the prescribed minimum altitude and descending into the overcast...".

Numerous photos of the crash scene, collectively titled "California Plane Crash Disaster," are viewable among Google's LIFE magazine photo archive.

== Survivors ==
Actress Caren Marsh Doll was among the survivors of the crash. She recalled "I heard screams and a fire crackling....Then I remember a woman grabbed my arm. She was wonderful. I heard her say 'Let's get out of here'. She dragged me out of the plane and into the brush." Members of the religious cult WKFL, led by Krishna Venta, were involved in the rescue operations, giving them national prominence.

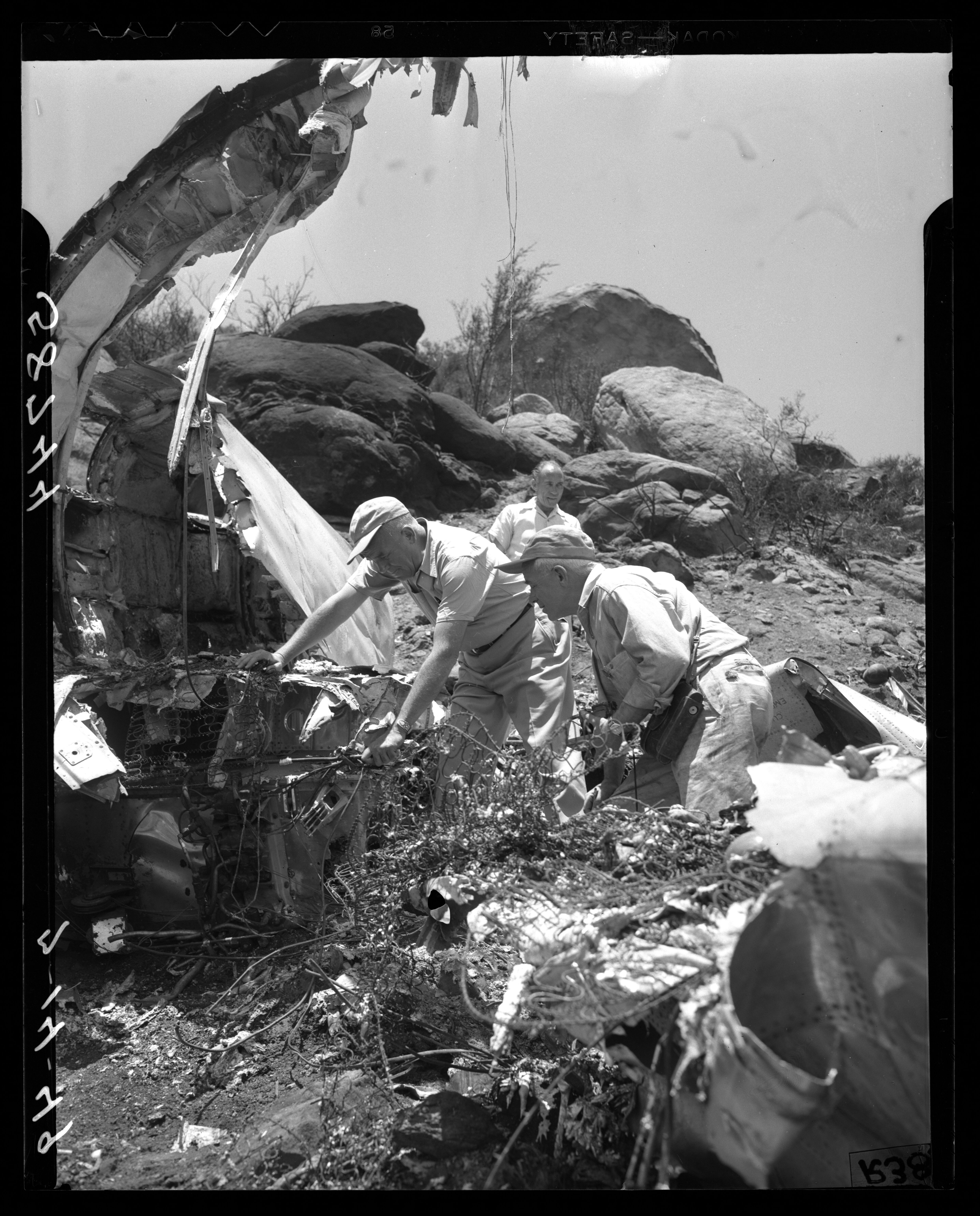
CAB investigators at accident site, 13 July 1949

== Aftermath ==
The crash happened only a week before the effective date of the revocation, by the Civil Aeronautics Board (CAB), of Standard's economic authority to operate due to failure to adhere to CAB regulations.

At the time, the CAB tightly regulated almost all US commercial air transport. It was also the federal body that investigated aircraft accidents, so it produced the official accident report for this accident.

== See also ==
- Controlled flight into terrain
