= California Central Airlines =

California Low Cost Scheduled Airline (1949–1955)

- Founded: 2 April 1947
- Commenced operations: 2 January 1949
- Ceased operations: 14 February 1955
- Fleet size: See Fleet
- Headquarters: Burbank Airport, California; United States
- Founder: Charles C. Sherman, Edna K. Sherman

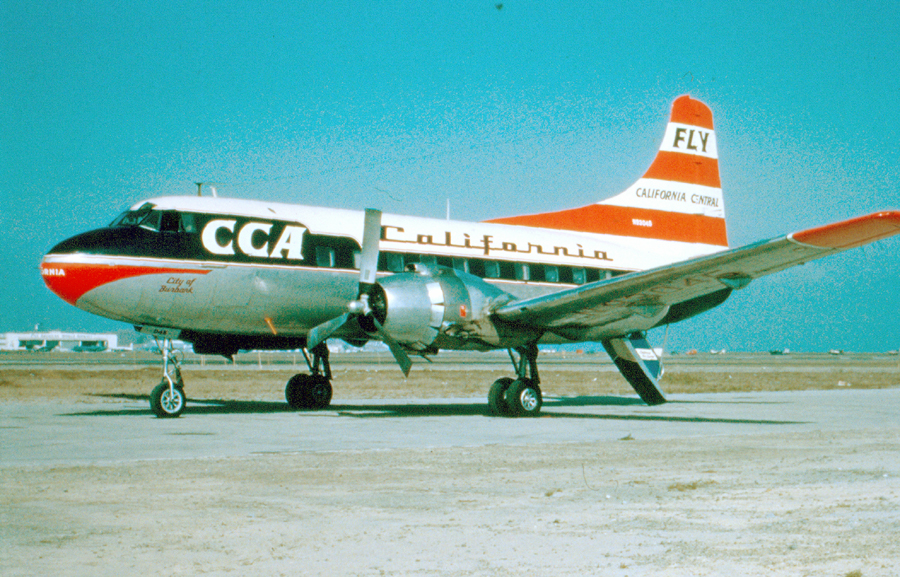
Martin 2-0-2 "City of Burbank" 1951

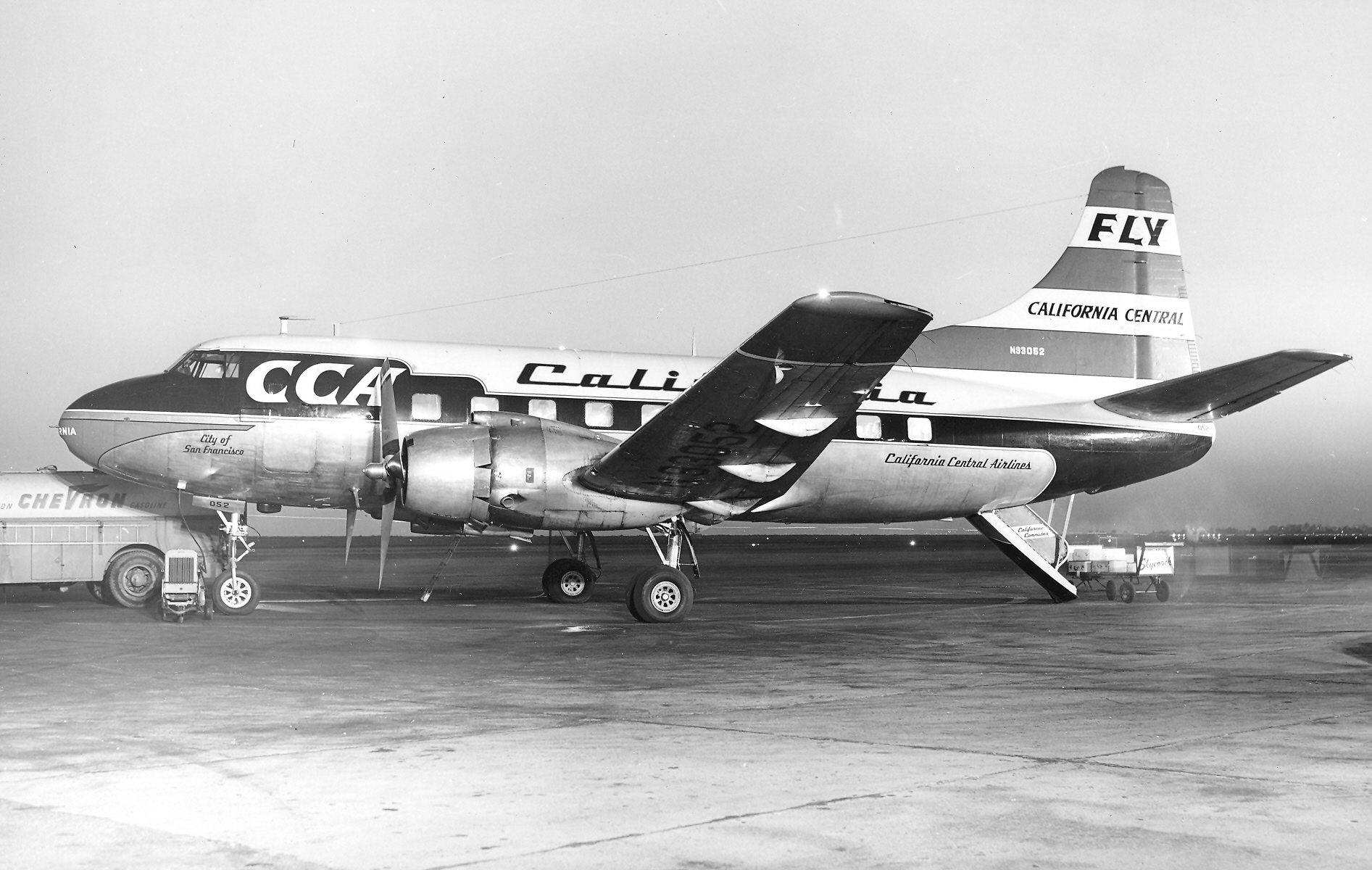
"City of San Francisco"

California Central Airlines (CCA) was a post-war American scheduled price-focused intrastate airline based at Burbank, California, the most prominent airline associated with Charles C. Sherman. CCA slightly preceded, and during its existence was bigger than, its contemporary and competitor, Pacific Southwest Airlines (PSA). The core route of both airlines was from Los Angeles to the San Francisco Bay Area.

After the collapse of the original CCA, its owners created another airline, California Coastal Airlines, which did business as California Central Airlines. This second California Central lasted until 1957.

== History ==
=== Airline Transport Carriers ===
Charles C. Sherman was an Air Transport Command pilot in World War II. He was initially the partner of Stanley D. Weiss at Fireball Air Express, the original name of Standard Air Lines, another irregular air carrier, before founding Airline Transport Carriers (ATC) with his wife, Edna K. Sherman, which was incorporated in California on 30 October 1946. In 1948, ATC was one of the top four leading irregular airlines offering scheduled service from New York to Los Angeles, which drew a September 1949 order from the Civil Aeronautics Board (CAB) to stop telling the public it was offering scheduled service. ATC had also applied for official approval to fly scheduled service on that route from the CAB, which was denied in October 1948. The CAB was the now defunct federal agency that, at the time, tightly regulated almost all US commercial air transportation. In August 1948, the CAB intensified its actions against the irregular airlines, like ATC, including attempting to suspend Standard's right to operate (Standard would fight this off in the courts until July 1949). ATC would continue to operate through 1962, as described further below.

=== Startup ===
On 2 April 1947, the Shermans incorporated California Central Airlines, a separate company, to offer intrastate air travel within California, initially on the Burbank airport (then known as Lockheed Air Terminal) to San Francisco Airport route, with the first flight on January 2, 1949, and equipment provided by ATC. CCA was the first of eight California intrastate carriers that started operations within a 13-month period (among them California Arrow Airlines), of which only PSA and CCA continued in operation for more than a year. As intrastate carriers, none of these new entrants was subject to regulation by the CAB. The intrastates initially charged $9.95 or $9.99 from Los Angeles to the Bay Area, less than half of the CAB-standard fare. By comparison, the Southern Pacific Railroad cost $7.50 and took 10 hours.

CCA started with four Douglas DC-3s and by January 1951, CCA/ATC had eight DC-3s and two DC-4s, one of which was contracted to the government supporting the Korean War. The airline upgraded to five Martin 2-0-2s (billed as "Martinliners") in 1951, sourced from Northwest Airlines. The 2-0-2s had tricycle landing gear and were significantly faster than DC-3s. An Aviation Week article says CCA sold four DC-3s to local service carrier Parks Air Lines immediately before Parks finally started service in 1950.

CCA ultimately extended the Burbank-San Francisco route to San Diego in the south and Sacramento in the north. It added Oakland and smaller points in California such as Salinas, Inyokern and Muroc (today's Edwards Air Force Base).

CCA was credited with having changed the transportation market between Los Angeles and San Francisco. In 1953, the US Senate Committee on Small Business noted that CCA had helped shift 65% of transport between the two cities to air, and asked the CAB to foster the same thing on the east coast.

California Central Airlines Financials, FY1950 thru 1954
USD 000	YE Mar 31				9Mo Ending	Jan 28, 1954 to
USD 000	1950	1951	1952	1953	Dec 31, 1953	Dec 31, 1954^{(1)}
Op revenue	848.6	1,175.5	1,652.8	2,113.5	1,279.4	1,734.9
Op profit (loss)	(30.4)	61.0	16.7	(9.6)	(161.7)	(25.1)
Net profit (loss)	(19.6)	44.1	14.4	(7.6)	(125.8)	(38.6)
Op margin	-3.6%	5.2%	1.0%	-0.5%	-12.6%	-1.4%
Net margin	-2.3%	3.8%	0.9%	-0.4%	-9.8%	-2.2%
(1) Includes activities of ATC, but CCA revenues were 99.5% of the whole for this period, when CCA/ATC were in bankruptcy.

=== Sidelines, distractions and competition ===
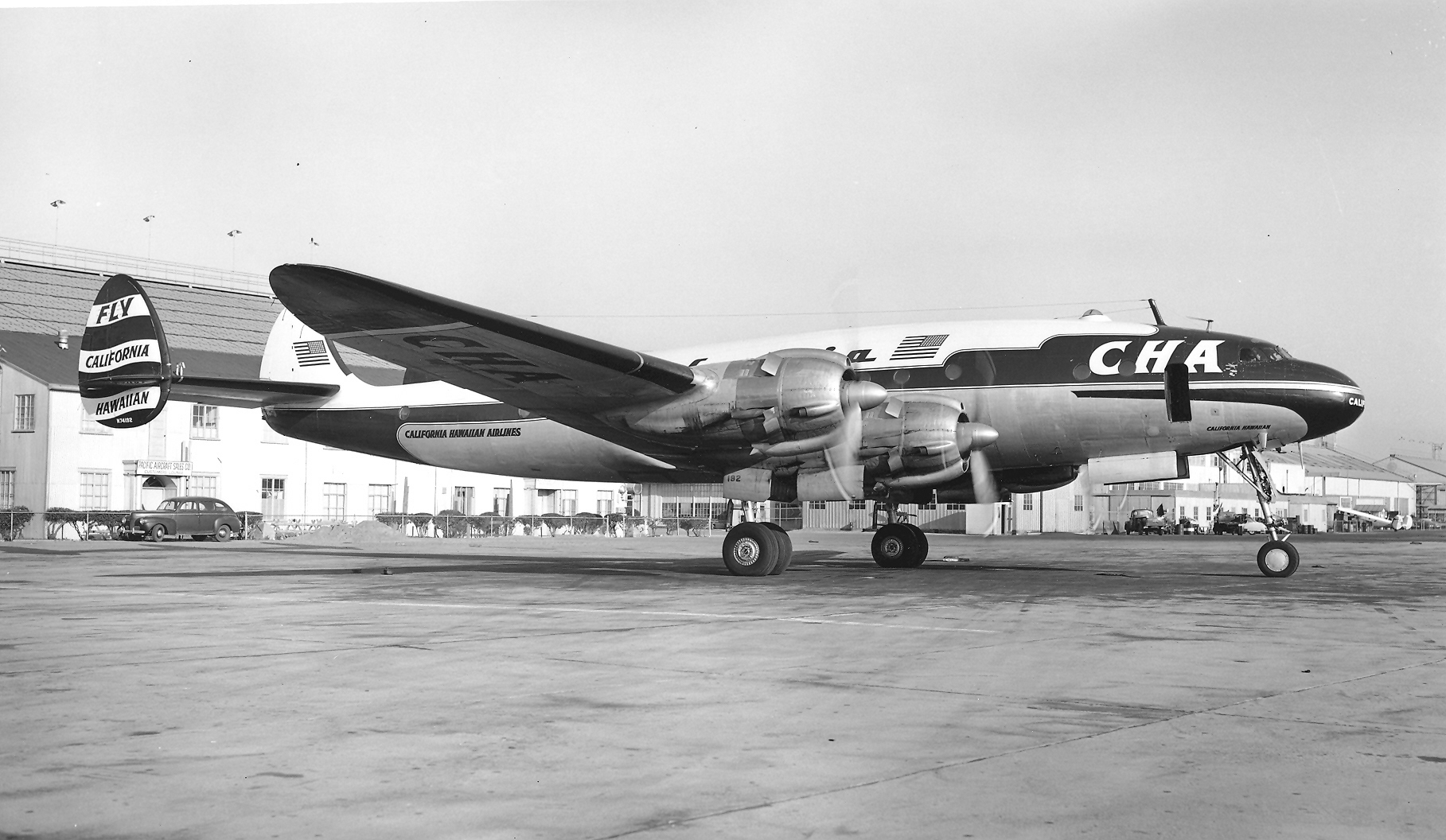
California Hawaiian Airlines Lockheed Constellation Oakland February 1953. See External links for a 1961 CHA Super Constellation photo

In 1952, ATC started flying to Hawaii under the name California Hawaiian Airlines (CHA) using a Lockheed Constellation, with a similar livery to CCA, described as "the plane with the candy-striped tail".

CCA and its owners had a high public profile, constantly in the news. CCA flight attendants regularly featured in fashion shows for department stores. The Shermans were the subject of media profiles. The company regularly billed itself as California's Pioneer Low Cost Scheduled Airline.

Unfortunately, CCA was also in the news for less positive reasons. It tangled with regulators:

- It angered the California Public Utilities Commission (CPUC) by jumping the gun on a fare increase, arguing that the CPUC had no right to regulate its fares, something that the California Supreme Court ruled was not true, leading to a very high ($138,000) fine (over $1.5mm in 2024 dollars) in 1954.
- The existence of ATC gave the CAB a continuing interest in CCA: the Shermans were admonished by the CAB because ATC and CCA were tightly coordinated, something that required CAB permission since both were aviation enterprises. That permission was ultimately granted, but not without angering the enforcement bureau of the CAB.

In June 1953, CCA suffered a wildcat strike when 70 mechanics working for ATC (but contracted to work on CCA aircraft) walked off the job, which interrupted service and generated damaging headlines. The strike lasted 37 days, affecting a peak period for CCA.

There was indication that competition from PSA was beginning to tell. In 1953 PSA charged lower fares ($11.70) with its DC-3 service than did CCA with its faster Martin 2-0-2s ($13.50) on the Los Angeles to Bay Area route. PSA, of course, touted its lower fare and CCA, annoyed it was undercut, tried to get the CPUC to order PSA to charge the same fare, which the CPUC refused to do. In August 1953, CCA re-instituted "Thriftliner" DC-3 service, matching PSA's fares, alongside continued Martin 2-0-2 service at $13.50.

In November 1953, CCA filed a securities registration seeking to sell debt and equity, where it was revealed the company had a significant working capital shortfall.

=== Bankruptcy ===
On January 27, 1954, CCA and ATC jointly filed for Chapter XI bankruptcy (pre-1978 US bankruptcy laws differed from those prevalent today - Chapter XI had some similarities to today's Chapter 11 but was not the same.). A condition of being able to reorganize under Chapter XI was that the companies show more assets than liabilities. CCA/ATC said it had assets three and a half times greater than its liabilities, but tied up in equipment.

CCA/ATC operated for a year under Chapter XI protection, but failed to reorganize. In January 25, the company was declared bankrupt and a trustee was appointed to sell the assets. PSA-owner Kenny Friedkin was among the initial bidders, but the winner, on February 14, was a group composed of Southwest Airways (unrelated to today's Southwest Airlines) and Allegheny Airlines with a bid of $800,000 (about $9mm in 2024 dollars). They ordered CCA/ATC to cease operations immediately and operations ceased at midnight. This was challenged in court, but ultimately upheld.

California Central Airlines and Pacific Southwest Airlines annual passengers, 1949–1954
Passengers	1949	1950	1951	1952	1953	1954
California Central Airlines	73,487	93,045	145,101	190,187	148,091	162,012
Pacific Southwest Airlines	15,011	45,390	75,995	92,484	115,028	102,124

=== Post-liquidation ===
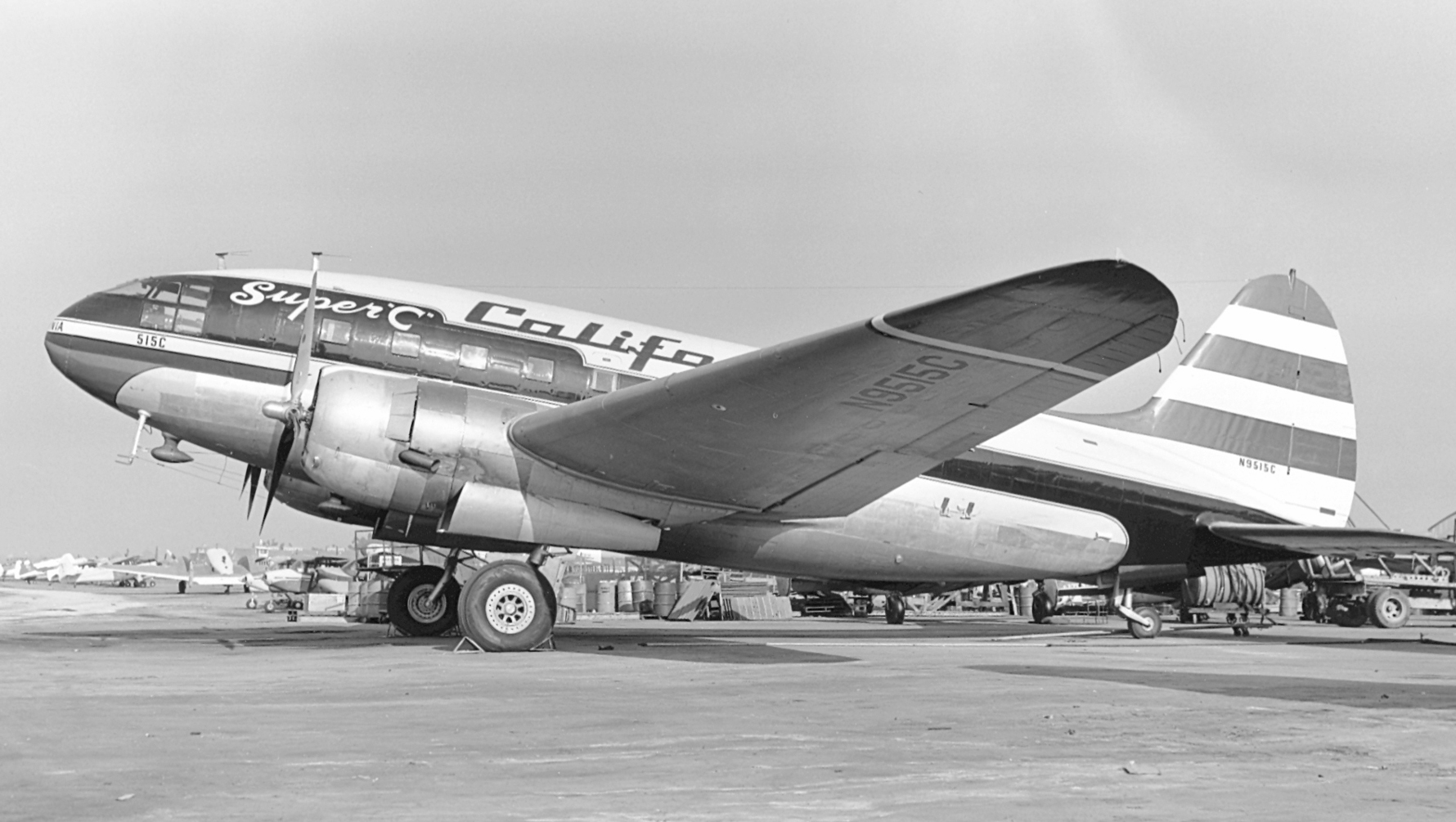
Curtiss C-46 at Long Beach August 1957. Date indicates this a California Coastal aircraft

After the assets of the original CCA/ATC were sold, ATC was discharged from bankruptcy and the Shermans resumed business. They bought the rights to use the California Central Airlines name which flew as a dba of California Coastal Airlines, a new company the Shermans established just prior to the auction of the original CCA. This version lasted until August 1957, its disappearance preceded by CPUC action against the airline for failing to refund over 200 customers, resulting in difficult headlines.

California Hawaiian Airlines, again a dba of Airline Transport Carriers continued through 1962. It flew for the military and passenger charters. But in December 1961 it was disqualified from flying military charters and in October 1962 it lost its Federal Aviation Administration operating certificate and in the same month a CAB examiner declined to give it authority to engage in supplemental operations. In 1963, CHA appealed the decision to the full board, without success.

== Legacy ==
CCA is little known today, but in the early 1950s its impact was noted nationally which helped start a conversation about the efficacy of airline regulation that ended 25 years later in US airline deregulation. CCA helped pave the way for the greater success of PSA.

== Fleet ==
The ATC/CCA/CHA fleet in 1953:

- 5 Martin 2-0-2
- 1 Lockheed Constellation
- 1 Douglas DC-3

== Incidents ==
- 28 January 1948: an ATC Douglas DC-3 (NC36480) crashed near Los Gatos, California with the loss of all 32 people aboard. The crash inspired a Woody Guthrie song.

== See also ==
- Intrastate airline
- Supplemental air carrier
- Pacific Southwest Airlines
- California Arrow Airlines
- List of defunct airlines of the United States
