= U. S. Airlines =

US scheduled all-cargo carrier (1945–1954)

- Founded: 9 June 1944 incorporated in Florida
- Commenced operations: 5 December 1945
- Ceased operations: 1954
- Operating bases: Fort Lauderdale, Florida; Atlanta, Georgia; St Petersburg, Florida (Pinellas); St Petersburg, Florida (Albert Whitted)
- Fleet size: See Fleet
- Headquarters: New York, New York; Fort Lauderdale, Florida; Atlanta, Georgia; St Petersburg, Florida; United States
- Founder: Harry R. Playford

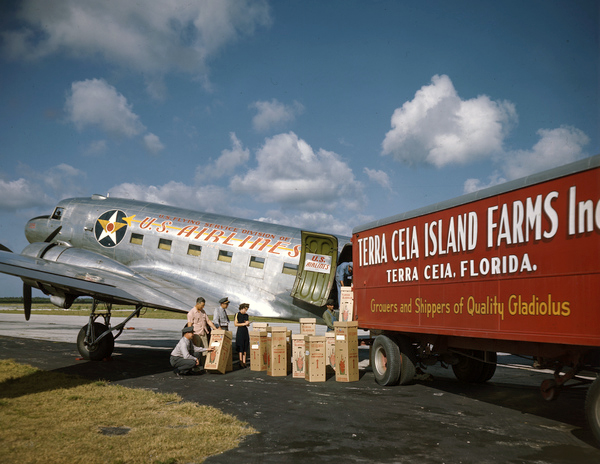
C-47 Sarasota 1947

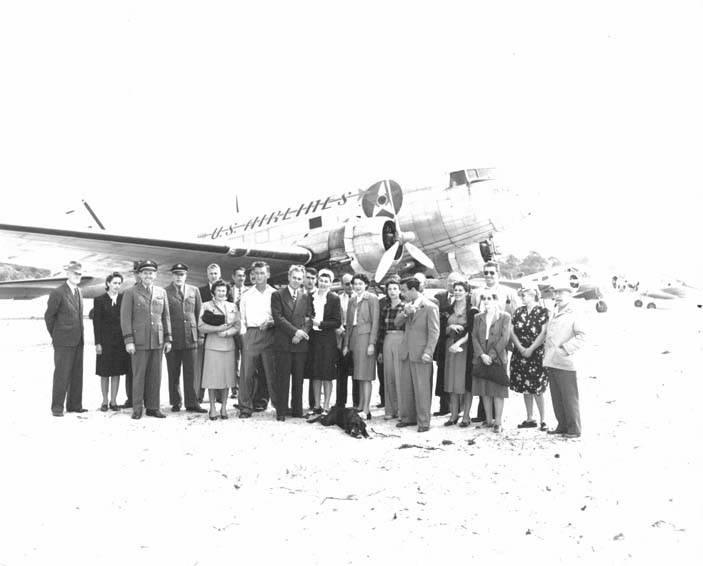
DC-3 at Honeymoon Island, Florida, 1947

U. S. Airlines (with a space between the "U." and "S.") was one of the first scheduled cargo airlines to operate in the United States, certificated as an "all-cargo carrier" by the Civil Aeronautics Board (CAB) (the now defunct Federal agency that, at the time, tightly regulated almost all US commercial air transportation) in July 1949 in the same proceedings that awarded certificates to Flying Tiger Line and Slick Airways. Flying Tiger and Slick were given transcontinental freight routes, U. S. Airlines was given north–south routes east of the Mississippi. The CAB picked U. S. Airlines over competitors in significant part because it was well capitalized. Harry Playford, then the president of the airline, was a former director of National Airlines. U. S. Airlines started certificated service 1 October 1949. The airline spent the time before its certification flying freight on east coast routes.

A photo of a U. S. Airlines C-46 is available under External links.

U. S. Airlines suspended scheduled service after less than two years of operations. Its fortunes notably diverged from those of Flying Tiger and Slick. In 1950 and 1951, Flying Tiger had revenues (operating margins) of $4.8 million (30%) and $6.5 million (40%) respectively, while those of Slick for 1950 and 1951 were $6.8 million (8.0%) and $9.8 million (4.7%). By contrast, U. S. Airline had 1950 and 1951 revenue (operating margin) of $0.56 million (-86%) and $0.58 million (-67%). The carrier went bankrupt in May 1951, reorganized and had another substantial leadership change in October 1952. Scheduled service was intermittent. U. S. Airlines then went bankrupt again in September 1953. Challenges mentioned in connection with its financial issues included demand seasonality, particularly northbound which depended on flower, fruit and vegetable harvests, and stock manipulation. The carrier also faced a great deal of competition, including higher capacity provided by irregular air carriers and scheduled passenger carriers (which could and did fly cargo aircraft).

Following its September 1953 bankruptcy, U. S. Airlines did not offer scheduled service again but briefly operated charter service at the start of 1954. Later that year, U. S. Airlines floated schemes to return to operation by merging with California Eastern Aviation (July) and by merging with Lost Dutchman Uranium Mining (October), the idea being that the airline would transport uranium ore by air. In November 1955 the CAB awarded its routes to other carriers, splitting them between AAXICO Airlines and Riddle Airlines (later known as Airlift International). At the time, U. S. Airlines had no aircraft and only two employees. The CAB declined to renew its certificate. Certificate revocation was official 20 January 1956.

U. S. Airlines was publicly traded. It went public in 1946, well before it was certificated, raising $2.9 million in gross proceeds (worth about $49 million in 2024 terms). Investigative journalists Drew Pearson and Jack Anderson reported that Colonel G. Gordon Moore, a brother-in-law of then-First Lady Mamie Eisenhower, was hired as an officer to help the airline intervene with the CAB as it fell on hard times (Moore is shown on incorporation records), and insiders thereby ramped the stock price of U. S. Airlines to help them offload shares before the airline went bankrupt.

== Fleet ==
As of May 1946:

- 14 Douglas C-47

As of December 1949:

- 5 Curtiss C-46

As of September 1953:

- 6 Curtiss C-46

== Accidents and incidents ==
- 14 March 1947 Douglas DC-3C NC88804 crashed at on approach to Charleston, South Carolina, killing the two pilots. The aircraft had been informed it was not properly aligned for landing and then crashed into trees short of the runway.
- 5 April 1952: Curtiss C-46F N1911M crashed at Jamaica, New York, killing the two pilots on board and three people on the ground, after an engine failure during a missed approach to New York Idlewild Airport in IFR conditions.

== See also ==
- List of defunct airlines of the United States
- Flying Tiger Lines
- Slick Airways
