= North American Airlines Group =

Rogue US virtual airline (1949–1957)

North American Airlines Group Trans American Airlines Group
- Founded: 1949
- Commenced operations: 1949 as North American Airlines
- Ceased operations: 5 June 1957 as Trans American Airlines
- Operating bases: Burbank, California
- Fleet size: see Fleet
- Destinations: see Destinations
- Headquarters: Burbank, California, United States
- Founders: James Fischgrund; R. R. Hart; Jack B. Lewin; Stanley D. Weiss
- Employees: 750

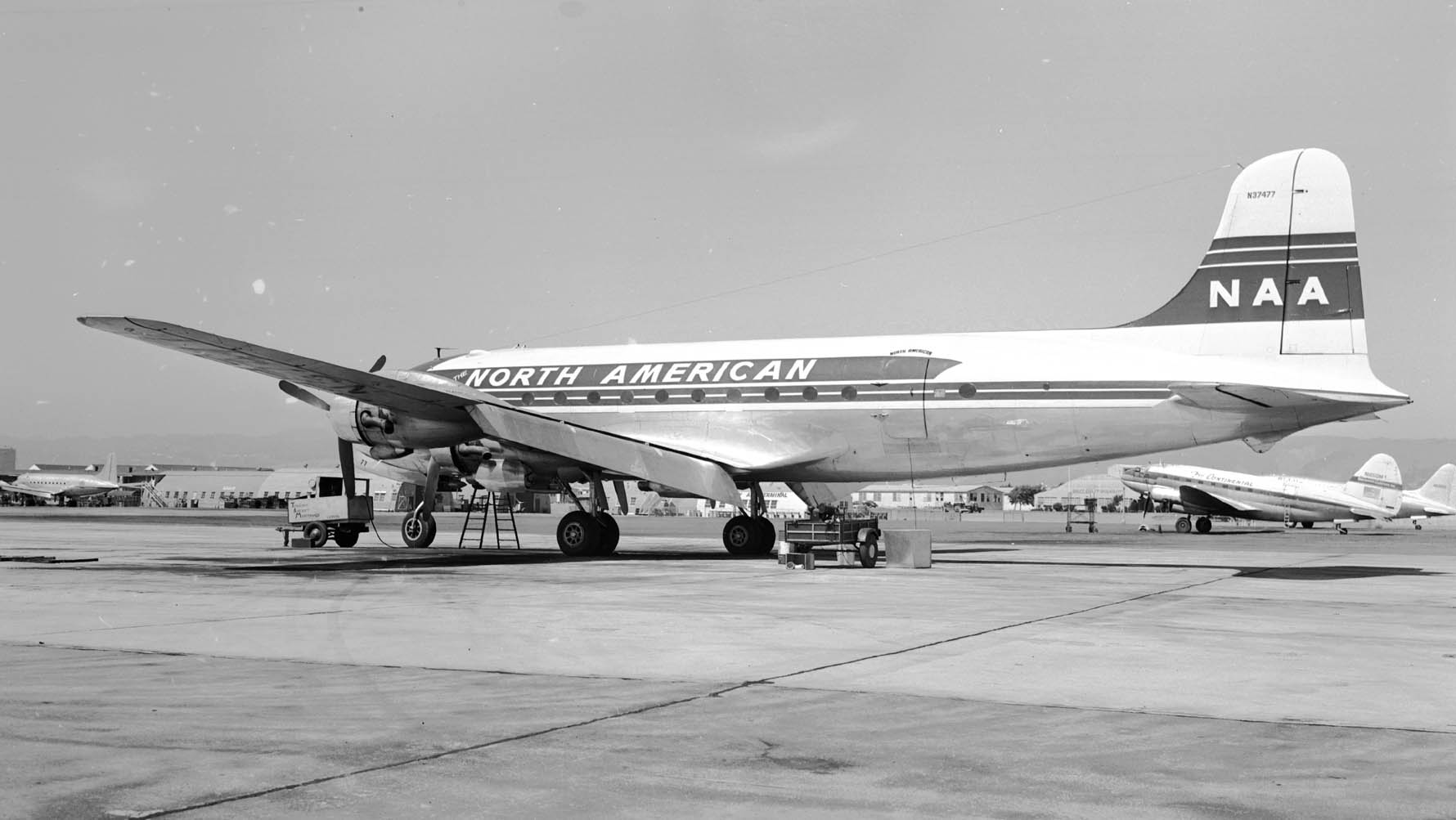
DC-4 Oakland July 1953

North American Airlines Group or North American Group, doing business as North American Airlines was a "combine", a group of US irregular air carriers and related companies under common control that acted as an early scheduled low-cost carrier in the period 1949–1957. It can be seen as a form of virtual airline.

North American was, at the time, highly controversial. It was a rogue airline, lucrative for the four partners who controlled it, bigger and more profitable than some of the smaller trunk carriers of the day yet operating in open circumvention of the law. In 1955, the Civil Aeronautics Board (CAB), the now-defunct Federal agency that, at the time, tightly regulated almost all US commercial air transport, revoked the group's right to operate. The group stayed in operation for almost another two years by challenging this in court, shutting down in 1957 after the US Supreme Court refused to hear a final appeal. A year earlier, in 1956, the group lost a trademark dispute with aircraft manufacturer North American Aviation, so for the last year of its existence was known as Trans American.

== Name ==
The group was a constellation of related businesses tied together by common ownership and contract. Many of these entities had similar names, sometimes even identical names. As an example, while the group marketed itself as "North American Airlines", that was also the name of one of the operating airlines controlled (but not owned) by the group. In 1956 Congressional testimony, its lawyer and accountants referred it both as "North American Airlines Group" and "North American Group". In its order to shut down the group, the CAB referred to it as the "so-called 'North American Combine' ".

== History ==
=== Context ===
In 1938 the United States legislated a system of tight airline regulation overseen by the CAB. Under this system, the domestic scheduled airlines were, for the main routes, the trunk carriers (certificated just prior to World War II) and for routes to smaller cities, the local service carriers (originally known as feeder carriers) certificated after World War II. But after World War II, another set of carriers sprang up, leveraging war-surplus aircraft and war-trained pilots, exploiting a loophole that allowed for "nonscheduled carriers." Originally numbering over 100, these airlines became known as irregular air carriers and later as supplemental air carriers. The CAB struggled to control these carriers, which remained uncertificated (the CAB issued them a "letter of registration" in lieu of a certificate). During the time North American operated, CAB regulation limited irregular carriers in their ability to offer scheduled service. Initially, scheduled flights were required to be offered on an "irregular" basis (hence the name). After 1955, the CAB simply restricted such carriers from offering more than 10 flights/month on any city pair. Irregular carriers were otherwise limited to offering charter flights.

=== Standard, Viking and Oxnard ===
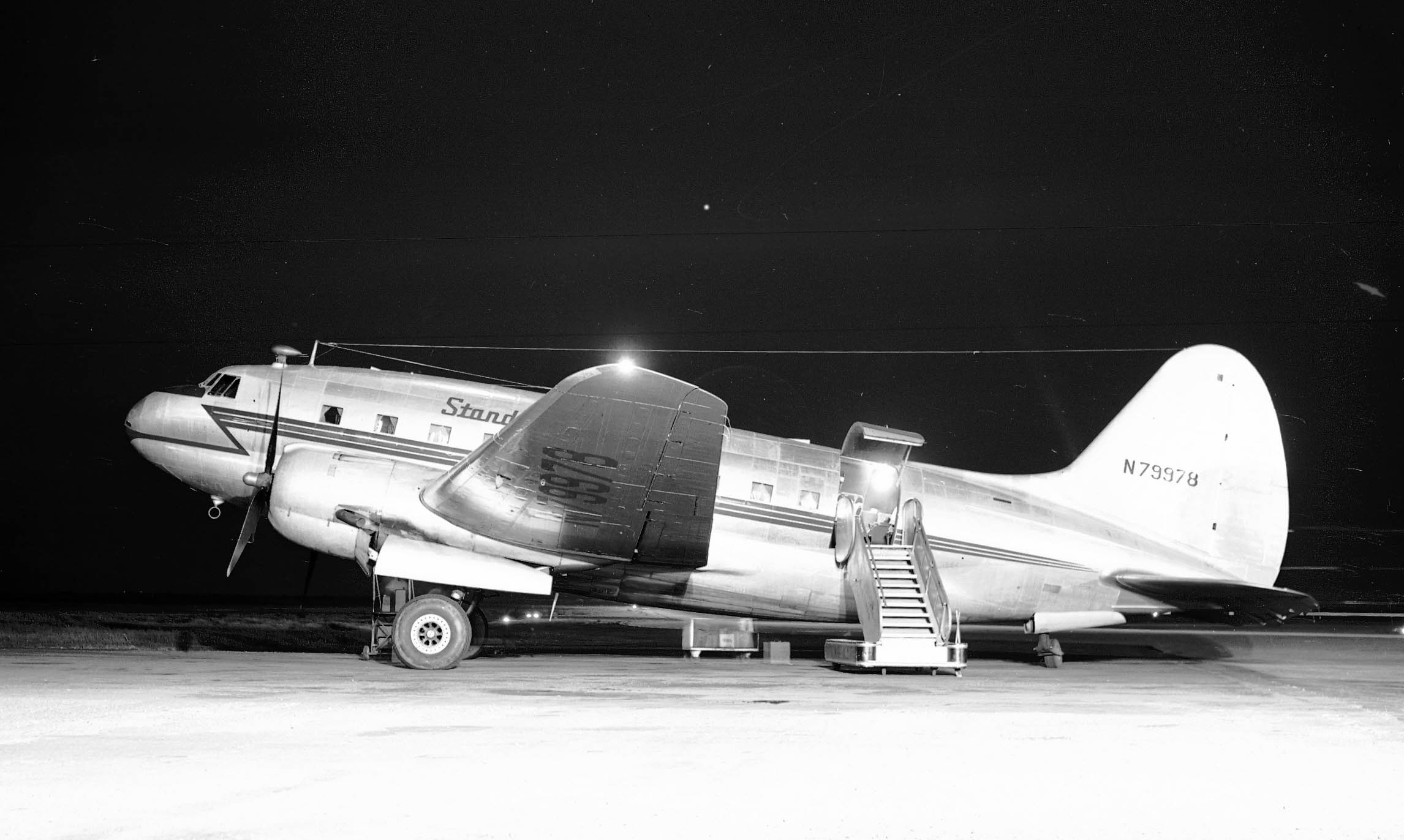
Standard Air Lines C-46 Oakland May 1949. In July this aircraft would crash on approach to Burbank with the loss of 35 lives. See External links for photos of Viking Air Lines and other North American-related aircraft

Stanley D. Weiss and James Fischgrund were partners in Long Beach-based Standard Air Lines, Inc. (incorporated in California on 10 June 1946, which operated as Fireball Air Express pre-incorporation). Jack B. Lewin and Ross R. Hart were partners in Burbank-based Aero-Van Express Corporation (incorporated in California on 18 February 1946). Separately, Harry Ljung incorporated Viking Air Transport, based at Glendale, California, on 23 January 1946. But Ljung stepped down in early May, replaced by Hart. In 1947, Viking Air Transport became the non-operating parent company of Aero-Van Express. Aero-Van did business as Viking Air Lines and in 1948 changed its name to that. Weiss was a former Air Transport Command pilot who flew the Hump, Fischgrund was a lawyer who served as a US Navy officer on a destroyer escort, Hart was a former Douglas Aircraft Company employee and Lewin served in the Army Air Forces Technical Training Command.

Standard and Viking were two of the first irregular airlines to be shut down by the CAB for operating scheduled flights. Along with Charles C. Sherman's Airline Transport Carriers (ATC; Charles Sherman was Weiss's original partner in Standard before he established ATC) the three carriers petitioned the CAB in July 1948 for approval to offer scheduled service. In fact they were already offering scheduled service; in 1948, they were three of the top four irregular airlines offering cheap transcontinental flights. In October the CAB refused the petition. By then, Standard and Viking were working with each other, sharing joint ticket agencies, for instance. The CAB shut down Standard on 20 June (effective 20 July), 1949 and Viking on 5 June (effective 5 July) 1950 for holding themselves out to the public as scheduled airlines in willful and knowing violation of the regulations. For each company this meant revocation of the letter of registration that the CAB issued to irregular air carriers in lieu of a certificate. Standard suffered a fatal crash only a week before its final date (see Accidents). Under new owners, Viking continued to operate until 1956 as a contract carrier, otherwise known as a Part 45 carrier (no longer a common carrier, unable to offer service to the public, the carrier escaped CAB regulation).

By the time the CAB revoked Viking, Hart was operating Oxnard Sky Freight. In 1950, among 55 irregular carriers operating that year, Oxnard was the largest by revenue passenger miles (RPMs: one revenue-paying passenger flown one mile), accounted for over 1/6 of the irregular carrier RPMs. Together with Viking before it was shut down, the two accounted for over 20% of all 1950 irregular industry RPMs. Oxnard Sky Freight was doing business as North American Airlines; the CAB described Oxnard Sky Freight as the "genesis" of North American. However, the CAB was already onto Oxnard and shut it for willful and knowing violations as of March 6, 1951, giving it only a week's notice versus 30 days in the case of Standard and Viking. By then, it appears the four partners were already onto the "classic" version of North American.

=== North American combine ===
Combine organization per 1 July 1955 CAB decision revoking North American's right to operate. Almost two years of litigation passed before the revocation became effective.

Fischgrund said in Congressional testimony the group started in 1949, though his partner Weiss said 1950; as mentioned above, Oxnard sold tickets under the North American name in 1950. Sometime after that, the partners switched to the more famous/infamous configuration as follows. Weiss, Fischgrund, Hart and Lewin had identical ownership of everything, other than the airlines. As discussed below, by design the partners did not own the airlines, nor have official management roles, but they tightly controlled them nonetheless. A sales and marketing organization, North American Airlines Aircoach System (originally "North American Airlines Agency") sold tickets, taking a 45% cut, though 15–30 points of the 45 went to a travel agency if North American did not sell it directly (CAB-certificated carriers paid only 5% to travel agents). In 1956 there were 26 sales offices. A separate partnership, Republic Aircoach System, handled back office (e.g. accounting). Twentieth Century Aircraft and California Aircraft owned aircraft and leased them to whichever airline needed them (see nearby chart). In 1957, shortly before it ceased business, the group had 750 employees.

Flying occurred under the authority of four (and after 1953, five) irregular airlines. The carriers were:

- Trans National Airlines, Inc.
- Twentieth Century Air Lines, Inc. (aka North American Airlines)
- Trans American Airways, Inc.
- Hemisphere Air Transport
- Unit Export Company, Inc. (1953 onward)

From March 1952, Twentieth Century Air Lines was renamed North American Airlines, but the CAB fought that for reasons described in the Name change section below. In its 1955 revocation order, for instance, the CAB consistently referred to the specific airline, North American Airlines, as "Twentieth Century Air Lines (North American Airlines)". After the group lost its trademark case in 1956, the name seems to have reverted to Twentieth Century Airlines (rather than Air Lines).

Unit Export was purchased (through a straw buyer) in May 1953. Since the airline only operated in the third and fourth quarters, all 1953 Unit Export statistics can be attributed to North American.

Only one carrier, Twentieth Century, had a payroll; it provided employees and anything else the other four needed, e.g. fuel. The other four carriers otherwise had little substance. Partner-owned organizations provided aircraft to whichever airline was operating the flights that day. The passenger experience was "North American Airlines": tickets said North American, as did airport facilities, the aircraft, passenger announcements, etc. The partners heavily marketed the name. Its 1955 marketing budget was estimated as over $1 million, with $500,000 devoted to "saturation" radio coverage in 10 markets. The typical radio spot was described in an advertising magazine as "loud, fast and high pressure." There were also neon signs and TV show sponsorships. Three main sets of books were kept: the ticket agency, the back office entity and Twentieth Century Air Lines. At the end of the year, entries were adjusted to produce a 2% or zero percent profit for each of the carriers.

=== California Air Charter ===
The CAB identified yet another irregular airline, California Air Charter (CAC), as a group affiliate. The carrier was controlled by a former Oxnard Sky Freight manager who was also a former Viking shareholder, and CAC had commercial agreements with North American, including operating a shuttle between Burbank and Oakland on North American's behalf.

California Air Charter was established as Kesterson, Inc., in 1946 in Knoxville, Tennessee. The name changed when the airline was sold in 1950. The CAB shut the carrier in a 1959 case for too-frequent scheduled service and other violations. Its authority was withdrawn in early 1960.

=== Letter of the law ===
The group structure was an attempt to obey at least some part of the letter of the law while frustrating its purpose, including:

- Running scheduled service with irregular air carriers. Irregular carriers could fly individually-ticked passengers only if service on any one route was "irregular" (relaxed in 1955 to simply be infrequent). By farming out crews and aircraft to each of its five carriers, North American held itself out as providing regularly scheduled service while each individual carrier stayed irregular. Of course, there were specific CAB regulations against just this thing, which was known as "pooling."
- By design, the carriers were easily replaceable, being little more than pieces of paper. Trans American Airways had "no office, no telephone, no employees, no stationery of its own and no salaries [...] paid to any of its officers." Twentieth Century Air Lines was acquired for $8,000. In 1954, the partners offered to settle with the CAB by shutting down the carriers. The CAB rejected the offer in part because it knew the carriers could be easily replaced, therefore very little would be solved by shutting down the specific carriers.
- The four partners ostensibly neither owned nor managed the carriers. Testimony from a court case between Hart and his ex-wife explained why, with Hart telling that judge about his use of personal funds to buy another carrier in anticipation of the shut down of Oxnard Sky Freight. Hart explained he was persona non grata with the CAB so could not be an airline owner, so the buyer's name on the bill of sale was kept blank to be filled in later with a dummy owner. Hart further explained how he and his partners were running a scheduled air service. The carriers were nominally owned and managed by stand-ins, who the CAB determined were flagrantly underqualified. For instance, the owner of Unit Export was an actor, the president of Trans National Airlines had no access to the company's bank account, his wife (the CAB summarized her qualifications as "performs regular duties of a housewife") was vice president of Trans National but the company later stipulated she did nothing but sign company minutes. None of the ostensible airline executives had offices in the group Executive Offices at Lockheed Air Terminal in Burbank. In practice, the partners had total control of the carriers. The CAB also followed the money. For instance, in a bank credit agreement, the partners represented the group as an integrated entity engaged in air transportation and provided guarantees from all meaningful group entities, including partner guarantees.
- A flaw in this arrangement was that common control of air carriers (regardless of nominal ownership) or even ongoing cooperation between them was forbidden without CAB approval, regardless of ownership.

=== Profits ===
CAB-regulated fare/mile vs flight length. 1955 fare/mile was essentially constant, overcharging for long-haul flights and undercharging for short-haul. 1975 fares better reflected underlying economics

North American was highly profitable by comparison with CAB-regulated airlines. In 1951, North American made operating profit of $1.16 million on operating revenues of $6.69 million. In 1955, sales were $15.50 million, operating profits of $1.16 million. By contrast, small trunk carrier Northeast Airlines had 1955 operating profits of $148,000 on revenues of $10.12 million, achieving a breakeven result only after receiving 15% of revenues as government subsidy. It was also rewarding for the partners; for the period 1951 through October 1953, they had drawn (i.e. dividended) $2.4 million between them (over $24 million in 2024 dollars). Each partner drew another $213,000 in 1954 and 1955, along with a salary of $2,000 per month.

A 1954 study by the Air Transport Association, the scheduled airline trade group (today known as Airlines for America), noted that the North American Group's revenue per airplane mile exceeded that of the trunk carriers (the domestic mainline scheduled airlines), which it attributed to North American running its aircraft at high load factors (87.8% vs 64.5% for the trunks). As discussed in Innovation North American's aircraft also had many more seats. But profits also reflected the CAB's then fare policy. The CAB set fares nationally for all scheduled carriers under its control at a constant amount per mile, regardless of distance (see nearby graph). This ignored underlying economics, that the cost per mile is higher for a short flight than long-flight (since many costs for a flight are independent of length). This meant CAB fares for long-haul flights were overly remunerative (but the CAB forced airlines to fly both long and short flights, essentially subsidizing shorter flights with the longer). North American could undercut CAB fares and still make money, something critics described as "cream-skimming."

=== Innovation ===
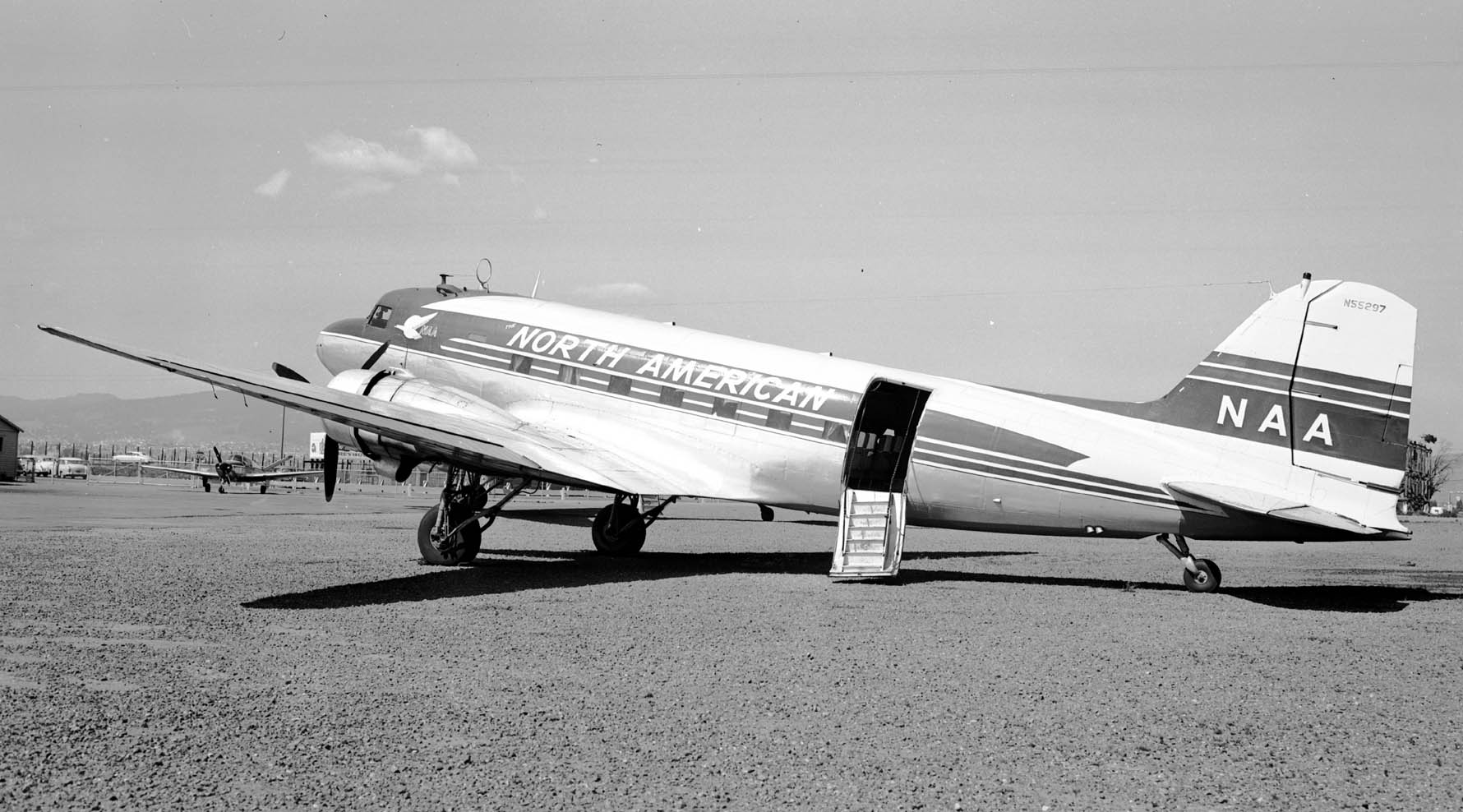
DC-3 Oakland May 1955. Note "drop down" door (compare to DC-3 below). The North American partners credited themselves with development of this airstair

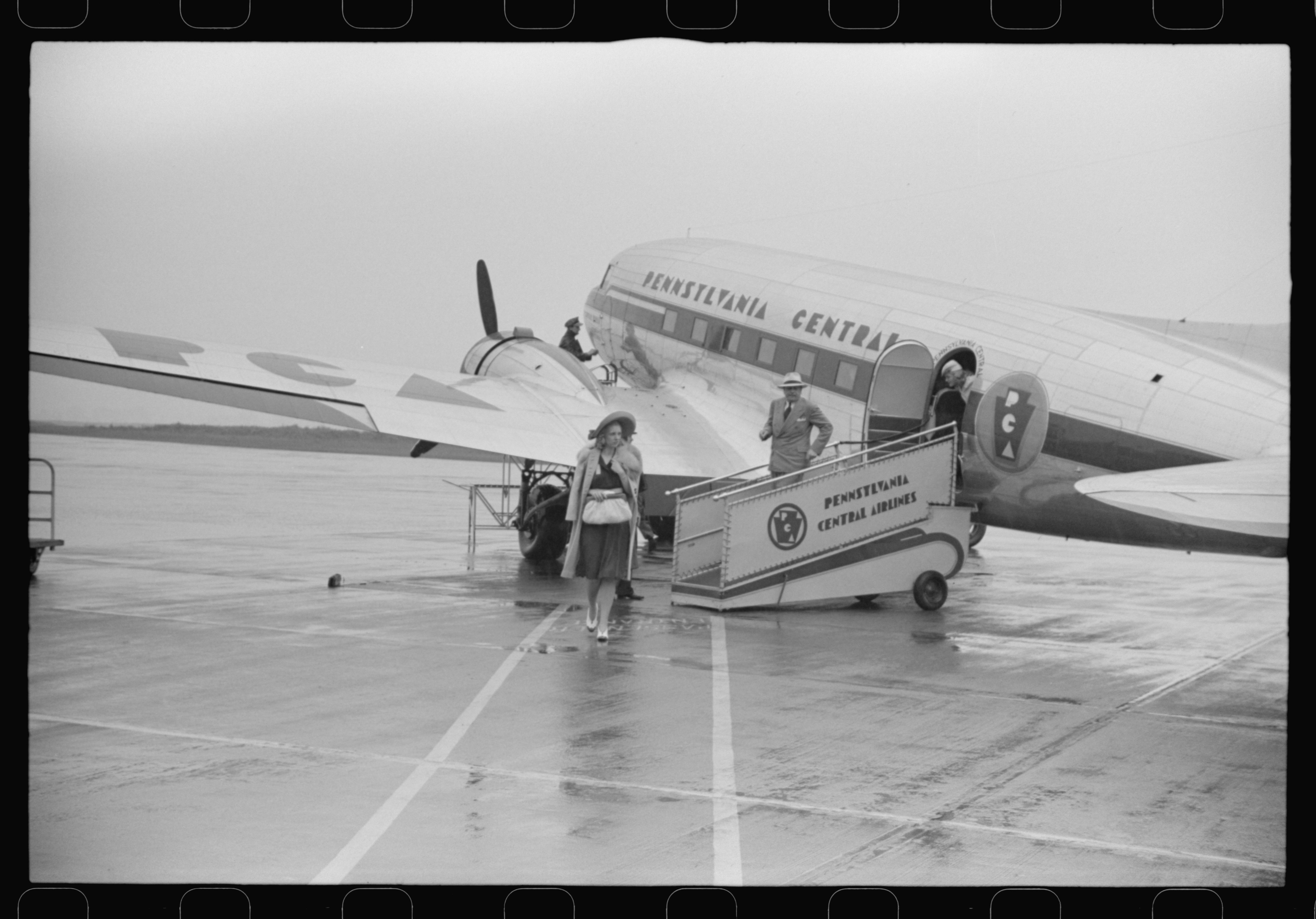
Pennsylvania Central DC-3 with original passenger door

The group said it was "first in aircoach" and credited itself with development of air coach (what we know today as economy class) in late 1945, which was clearly reaching back to the Standard/Viking days. Air coach meant no-frills flights with higher density seating; for instance, on a DC-6, seats were five abreast rather than four, and a DC-4 had 80 seats versus 50–55 originally. North American said it was the first to create space for people to bring carry-on bags, to give coach passenger free meals and make various innovations in passenger handling helped speed people through the airports, including an airstair modification for the DC-3 (see picture) which they referred to as a "drop down door". Also, the partners were able to afford brand-new fast, pressurized DC-6B aircraft, giving the group equipment on par with the certificated carriers. For its part, the Air Transport Association (ATA), the scheduled airlines' club, refused to concede North American had contributed anything to air travel. For instance, in 1956 Congressional testimony the head of the ATA said: "... North American group has done nothing for air transportation; nothing."

=== Name change ===
North American Aviation, creator of the P-51 Mustang among other aircraft, sought an injunction in 1951 to prevent the group's use of "North American". The group fought it all the way to the Supreme Court, which denied certiorari on 30 April 1956. The Federal appeals court ruling against the group described North American Aviation's virtues at length, referred to the ticket-selling organization as nothing more than a "ticket drummer", of knowing full well it was taking advantage of the good name of the aircraft manufacturer, noted that California had refused to register the name "North American" due to obvious confusion and said the group's hands were "unclean". The group changed its name to Trans American on 14 May 1956. But in August, a Federal judge fined three of the partners for contempt for continuing to use the North American name.

Separately, in a case that also went to the U.S. Supreme Court, American Airlines, along with the CAB, sought to stop North American from using "American" in their name. It was for this reason the CAB also refused to use the name "North American Airlines" for the carrier previously known as Twentieth Century Air Lines. The case was heard by the Supreme Court and remanded. The appeals court decided "North American" was not OK, but the use of the word "American" as part of a name was not in itself forbidden. By this time, the group was already calling itself Trans American.

=== Public relations and lobbying ===
Organizational chart produced by North American Aviation for its trademark suit against the group and submitted into evidence by opponents in Congressional testimony.

North American engaged in substantial public relations and lobbying. North American's $15.5mm in 1955 revenue remained tiny against the $1.59bn of the certificated carriers (American alone was $255mm in domestic revenue), so there was a David-vs-Goliath story to be told. North American produced brochures making its case, created corporate image advertisements for industry trade journals and occasional newspaper advertisements not about its service, but its existence. They put a former senator, Joseph C. O'Mahoney on their board. Lobbying resulted in some blowback. The group hired Murray Chotiner to lobby on its behalf, leading to North American becoming part of a 1956 influence peddling scandal in the Eisenhower Administration. Chotiner had run Richard Nixon's early political campaigns (Nixon being Eisenhower's vice president.) In 1958, it was revealed that Eisenhower's powerful chief of staff, Sherman Adams, had assisted Chotiner with the CAB, making it an even bigger deal. But by then, the group was dead.

The group's complexity worked against it in settings like Congress. In one hearing, opponents republished a complex group organizational chart which North American Aviation prepared for its trademark suit against the group. The group's lawyer, testifying, objected to the chart as "childish", something "you would see in a psychiatrist's office" and "perfectly ridiculous", but then, only a moment or two later, conceded it was "essentially accurate." Further, because the group re-used names, apparently simple questions had confusing answers. A member of Congress asked: "Is the North American Airlines a single corporation?" The answer was both yes (North American Airlines, Inc., the airline was a single corporation) and no (North American Airlines the Group was not). Testimony got bogged down just trying to understand the organization. The CAB answered the question of why the group was so complex by saying that in part it was to evade and circumvent the Civil Aeronautics Act of 1938. In other words, the law.

=== Demise ===
The CAB revoked North American's right to operate on 1 July 1955, the culmination of an investigation lasting over two years. An Aviation Week editorial acknowledged the accomplishments of the irregular carriers, but said the CAB had no choice: North American was making a mockery of the system and if the system needed change the solution was to change the law, not break it. North American took the case to an Federal appeals court, during which the group kept operating. On 20 December 1956, the appeals court said that North American (now Trans American) circumvented the law, both in creating a de facto scheduled airline, and in effectively merging multiple carriers. That the partners had a history of willfully disobeying CAB strictures, and were doing so, blatantly, again with North American, meant the CAB was within its rights to refuse to certificate the carrier and shut it down. On 18 January 1957, the appeals court denied a rehearing. Trans American appealed to the Supreme Court. Anticipating the end, in March 1957 Trans American pre-emptively leased its then five DC-6B aircraft, plus two others on order, to Eastern Air Lines starting in May. The group said legal and other costs of trying to stay in business were over $1mm. The Supreme Court denied certiorari on 22 April 1957. Trans American's last flight arrived at Burbank on 6 June 1957. A US senator said that Trans American had brought its own troubles upon itself. Another said that giving Trans American a certificate would have been like awarding a liquor license to a bootlegger after Prohibition on the grounds of having proved his efficiency.

== Legacy ==
After the CAB revoked its Letter of Registration, Twentieth Century Air Lines continued for a time as a Part 45 carrier, similar to Viking Air Lines after its revocation. Twentieth Century Aircraft and Stanley Weiss remained active in the aircraft leasing business into the 1970s.

Trans American/North American of the 1950s is hardly remembered today. Less than 20 years later, there was no mention of the group in testimony during Senator Ted Kennedy's 1975 Senate hearings on the deficiencies of the CAB, generally seen as the beginning of the process that resulted in US airline deregulation in 1979. Whereas North American's contemporary, California Central Airlines, a pioneer intrastate airline run, legally if not ultimately successfully 1949–1955, by Weiss's one time partner, Charles C. Sherman, was a topic of discussion.

== Fleet ==
Final fleet was:

- 5 Douglas DC-6B (plus two orders)
- 3 Douglas DC-4
- 1 Douglas DC-3

== Destinations ==
From a Trans American schedule dated 20 June 1956:

- Chicago
- Dallas
- Detroit
- New York
- Los Angeles
- Miami
- Oakland
- Washington, DC

== Accidents ==
Includes accidents from predecessor organizations including when a carrier may not have been under the control of the partners.

- 16 May 1946: A Viking Air Transport DC-3 NC53218 on a flight to Atlanta returned to Byrd Field at Richmond, Virginia with a rough engine when it crashed and burned, killing all 27 on board. The crew failed to: inspect the engines despite trouble on the prior flight, identify the right engine as the trouble, retract the landing gear after an earlier landing attempt and feather the propeller on the failed engine. The captain was on the job a week and allowed himself to be persuaded by the first officer (part owner of the company) to continue into adverse weather.
- 3 June 1948: An Aero-Van Express dba Viking Air Lines DC-3 flight lost an engine and made a forced landing at an auxiliary airfield near El Morro, New Mexico. 28 passengers and three crew were unharmed but the aircraft was a write-off. The inspectors cited the airline for the aircraft being overweight, in poor repair and not following procedures for the emergency landing.
- 12 July 1949: Standard Air Lines Flight 897R Curtiss C-46E N79978 from Albuquerque crashed near Chatsworth, California, on approach to Burbank due to the captain descending below prescribed minimum altitude. The crash killed 35 out of 48 aboard, including the captain and first officer.
- 31 August 1952: Unit Export Curtiss C-46F N1688M was taking off on a military charter flight from Prescott, Arizona to Oklahoma City, Oklahoma. On retracting, the right landing gear snagged actuator lines that tripped hydraulic, oil and fuel shutoff valves to the right engine, shutting it down. The aircraft was unable to maintain altitude, so the crew belly-landed on open ground. No one was injured and there was no fire. See External links for a photo of this aircraft four months before the accident.
- 30 August 1953: A Hemisphere Air Transport DC-4, operating as North American Airlines, returned to the ramp at Dallas Love Field because an indicator light showed a door to be open. A ramp worker responding to the aircraft was cut in half when he walked into a propeller.

== See also ==
- Supplemental air carrier
- List of defunct airlines of the United States
