= Capitol Air =

US charter & low cost airline (1946–1984)

Capitol Air; Capitol International Airways; Capitol Airways

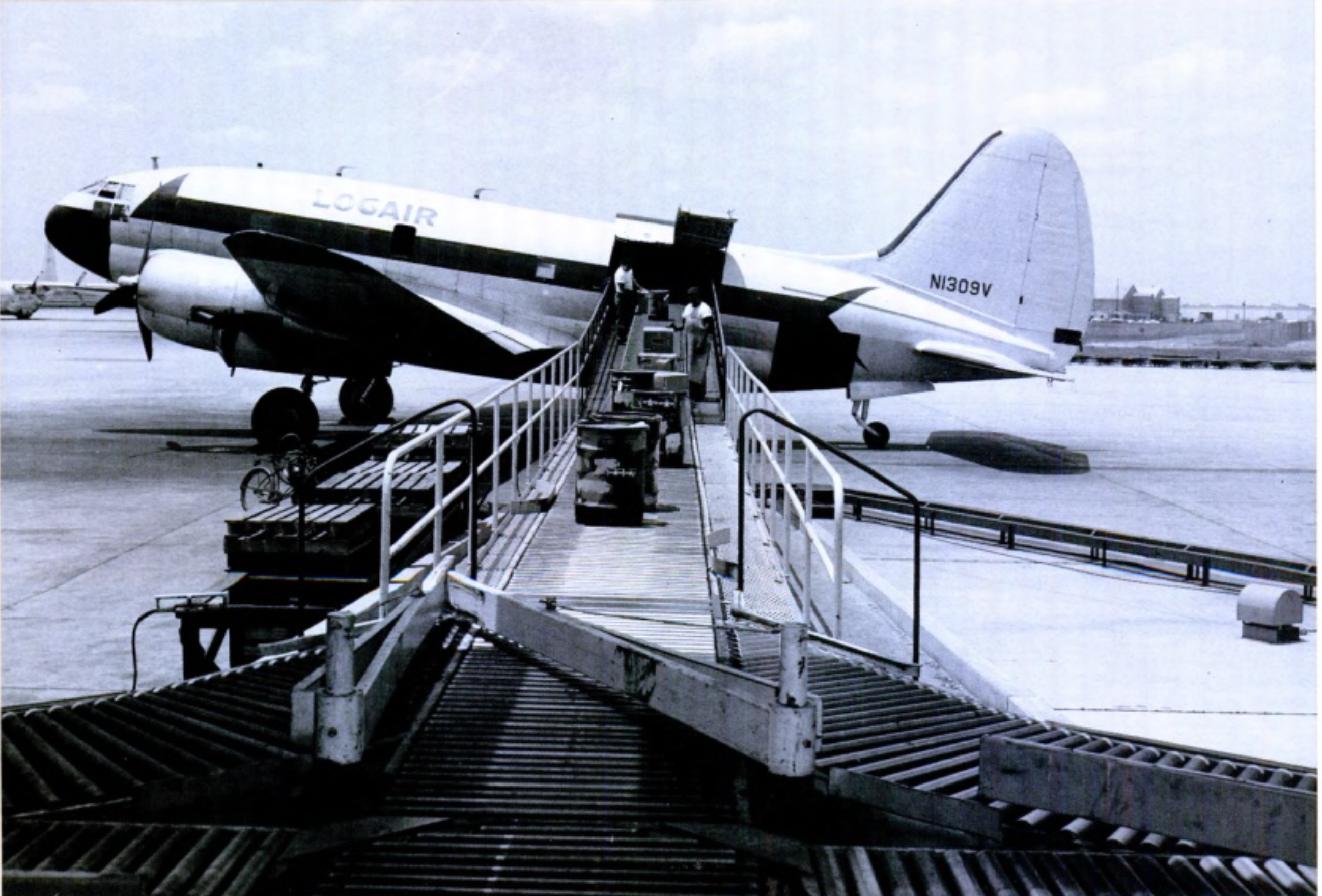
IATA	ICAO	Call sign
CL^{(1)}	CL^{(1)}	CAPITOL
- Founded: 11 January 1946 as Capitol Airways; 17 March 1967 as Capitol International Airways; 6 January 1982 as Capitol Air
- Ceased operations: 25 November 1984
- Operating bases: Smyrna, Tennessee; Wilmington, Delaware; Nashville, Tennessee
- Subsidiaries: Volunteer Airlines
- Fleet size: See Fleet
- Destinations: See Destinations
- Headquarters: Smyrna, Tennessee; Nashville, Tennessee; United States
- Founders: Jesse F. Stallings; R.R. McInnis
- Employees: 2,000 (1983)

Notes
- (1) Before the mid 1980s, two-letter IATA codes also served as ICAO codes

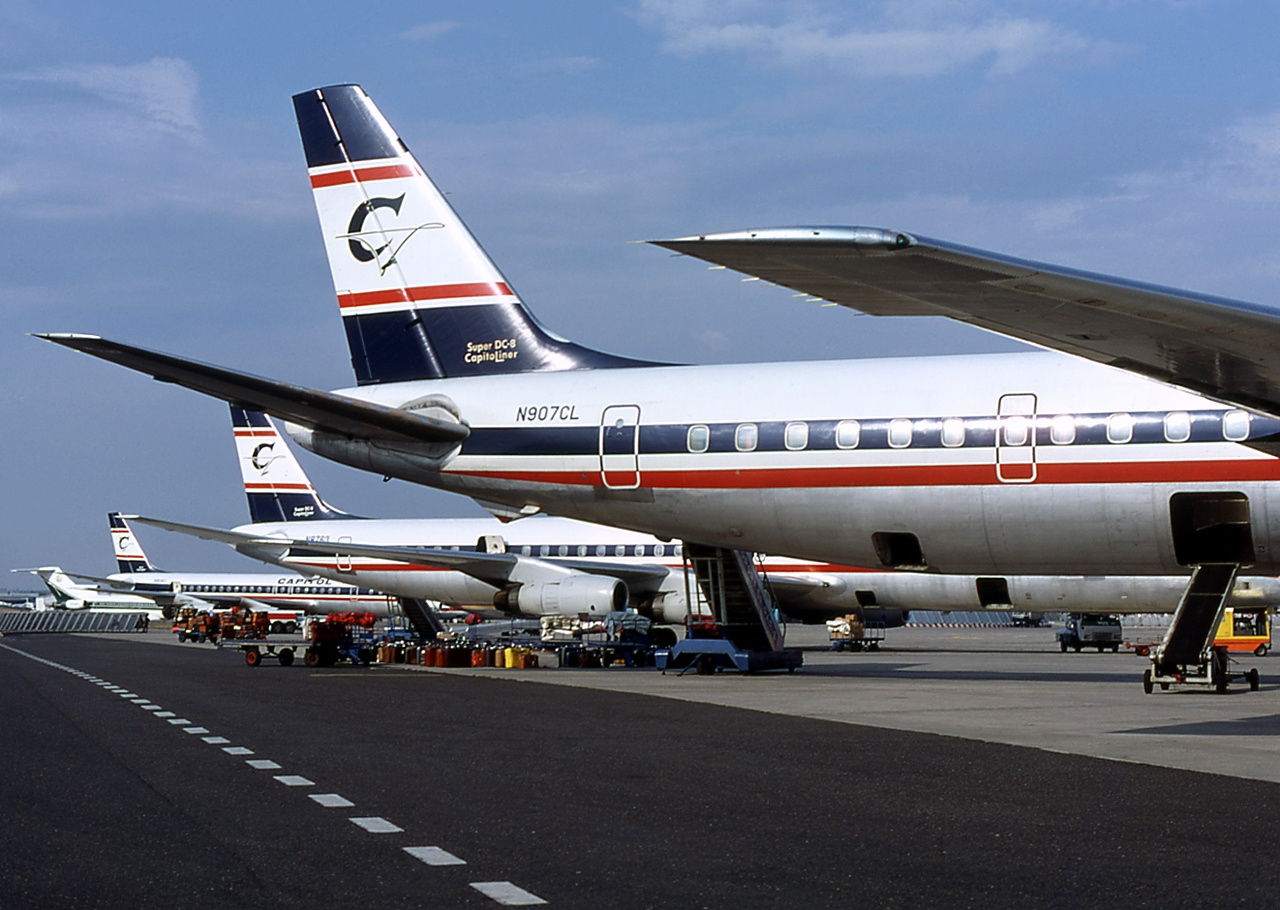
Three Capitol DC-8s at Paris 1976

Capitol Air was a United States supplemental air carrier regulated by the Civil Aeronautics Board (CAB), the now-defunct Federal agency that, at the time, tightly regulated most US commercial air transport. From 1979, Capitol was a scheduled passenger airline. From 1964, supplemental air carriers were just charter carriers but until 1964 Capitol did a small amount of scheduled flying. The airline was founded as Capitol Airways in 1946. In the mid-1950s Capitol primarily flew for the military and was a founding carrier of the US Air Force Logair domestic freight system. In 1954–1955 Capitol operated a Tennessee intrastate airline called Volunteer Airlines. By 1960 Capitol developed commercial charter programs to Europe and for a time was the second-largest supplemental by revenue. It introduced its first jet in 1963 and became Capitol International Airways in 1967. Except for a brief period in the 1960s, Capitol's financial performance was mediocre, though the mere fact it survived the regulated era made it noteworthy (most such carriers did not). 1979 US airline deregulation coincided with the death of Capitol's founder/dominant owner, following which the airline became an unsuccessful scheduled carrier under three successive new owners before its 1984 demise. The airline adopted its final name in 1982.

A lasting impact of Capitol was from its 1974 refusal to cooperate with US govt attempts to reduce transatlantic competition to benefit financially-distressed Pan Am, then the dominant US international carrier. As a result, the CAB imposed minimum transatlantic charter fares, causing a backlash that included the first 1974–1975 hearings by Senator Ted Kennedy, kicking off a process that ultimately resulted in 1979 US airline deregulation.

In 1984, entrepreneur John Catsimatidis became a significant minority shareholder of Capitol Air shortly before its demise. In 1992, Catsimatidis started a new charter airline named Capitol Air Express with a similar livery to the final livery of Capitol Air. 1990s photos of Boeing 727s in this livery relate to this later Capitol Air Express.

== History ==
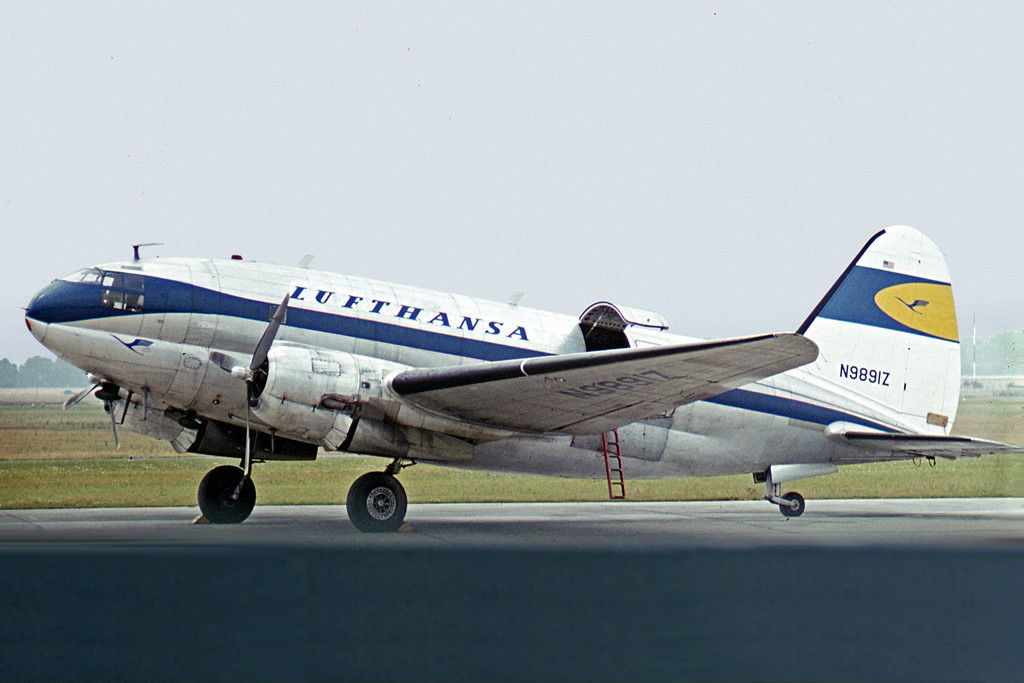
Capitol C-46 at Düsseldorf 1964. Capitol operated on behalf of Lufthansa 1964–1969

=== Startup and transition to airline ===
Capitol Airways was founded by Jesse F. Stallings and R.R. McInnis, former American Airlines pilots who flew for the Air Transport Command in World War II. Each contributed $5000 but McInnis withdrew after about six months. Capitol was incorporated in Tennessee on 11 January 1946, and initially operated as a fixed base operator (FBO), providing flight instruction, aircraft sales and service and chartering of light aircraft at Cumberland Field in Nashville. This was a segregated business; a separate operation at the field offered services to black people. Capitol acquired a Lockheed Lodestar aircraft in 1947 to fly for the Grand Ole Opry. Capitol's Letter of Registration (what irregular air carriers received from the CAB at the time in lieu of a certificate) was issued 11 August 1947.

Stallings flew Capitol's first Douglas DC-3, bought for $7,500, to Nashville solo from New York LaGuardia in winter with a busted copilot-side window. Capitol had two Douglas DC-3s by 1948, also the year the airline moved most functions to Berry Field, today's Nashville International Airport. In 1949 just over half its revenues were transport-related.

=== 1950s: decade of growth ===
As Table 1 shows, the 1950s were a decade of substantial growth for Capitol, though it never achieved much more than break-even financial results. By the 1960 it was the second largest supplemental carrier by revenues. In 1951 Capitol started flying military charters. Capitol Air Sales was incorporated in 1953 and took over the FBO activities. In 1954, Capitol Airways successfully bid to fly six Curtiss C-46s for what became Logair, a domestic Air Force cargo virtual airline. That year, the airline flew a total of nine C-46s and four DC-3s. Further, from October 1954 to July 1955, Capitol operated a Tennessee intrastate airline under the name Volunteer Airlines with DC-3s (External links has a link to a Volunteer Airlines timetable). Losses exceeded $100,000 (over $1.2 million in 2025 terms).

Capitol would fly for Logair until 1965. In 1956 and 1957, almost all its revenue was from the military (see Table 1). In 1960, Capitol flew 40 C-46s for Logair, half leased from AAXICO Airlines, a losing bidder that year. In 1958 Capitol flew its first passenger charters to Europe. By 1959 Capitol had five Lockheed Constellations and in February made New Castle Airport at Wilmington, Delaware its main operational base.

Table 1: Capitol Airways financial results, 1952–1960(1) Profit before tax (2) Versus other supplemental air carriers
	1952	1953	1954	1955	1956	1957	1958	1959	1960
Operating revenue:									
Military charter		685	1,969	3,347	4,957	6,642	5,387	5,016	6,492
Civilian charter		236	229	288	60	55	2,814	4,830	5,571
Scheduled			33	121	20	28	32	668	502
Other		277		8					9
Total	972	1,198	2,231	3,764	5,037	6,725	8,233	10,514	12,574
Op profit (loss)	19^{(1)}	36	24	67	27	1	(117)	(204)	131
Net profit (loss)		25	9	81	191	(2)	(90)	(282)	105
Op margin (%)		3.0	1.1	1.8	0.5	0.0	-1.4	-1.9	1.0
Operating revenue:									
% of industry^{(2)}	1.4	1.7	4.1	4.9	7.5	13.3	12.6	13.7	15.1
Industry^{(3)} rank	22	8	6	6	4	2	3	4	2

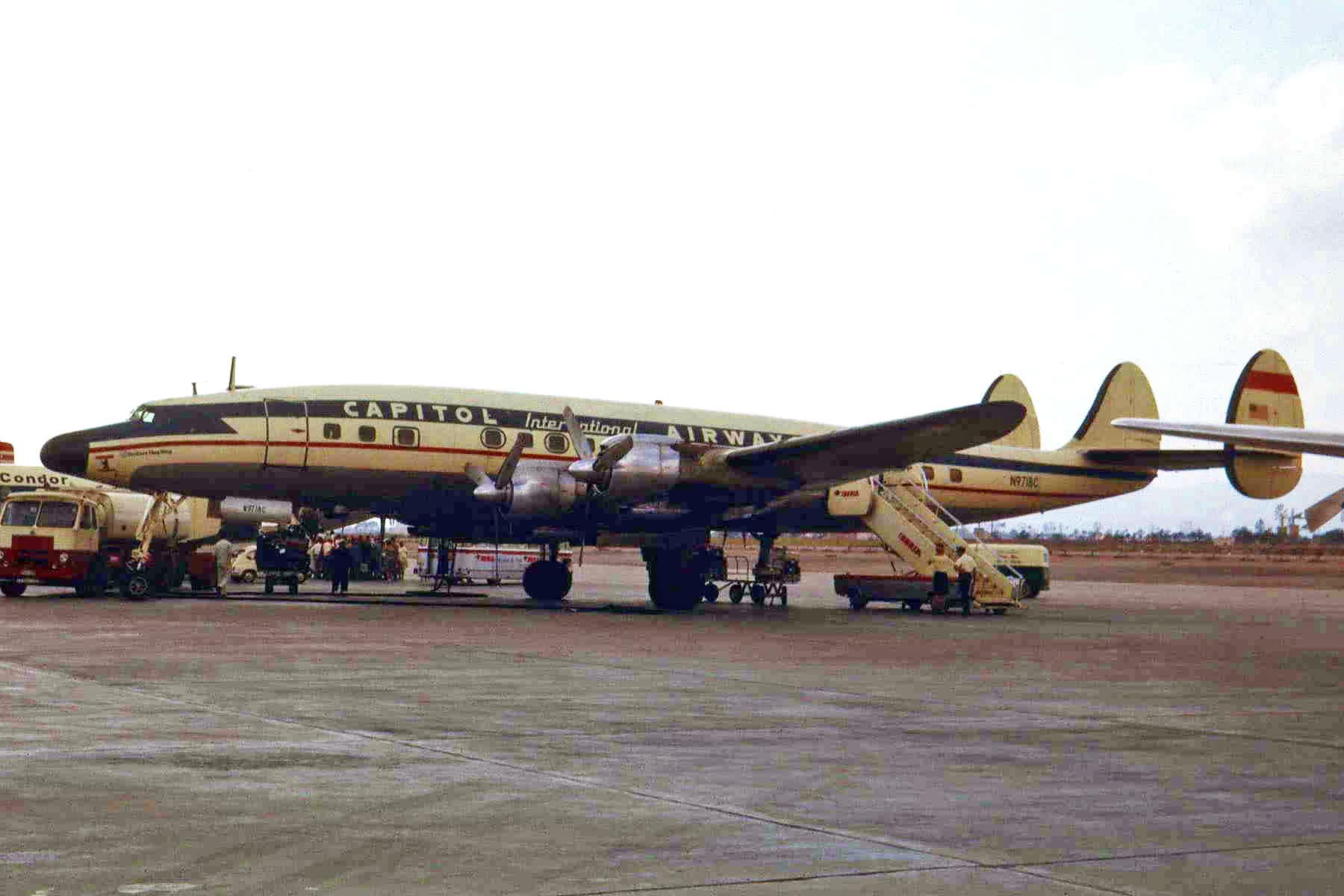
Super Constellation at Mallorca 1967

=== Turboprops and jets ===
By July 1962, Capitol was flying five Armstrong Whitworth AW.650 Argosy aircraft for Logair, its first turbine equipment. The Argosies were out of the fleet by year end 1965, consistent with Capitol's exit from domestic military flying. In October 1963 Capitol was the third supplemental air carrier (after Trans International Airlines and World Airways) to introduce jets with a convertible (passenger/freight) Douglas DC-8-54F. In February 1964, Capitol set a commercial aviation world record by flying a DC-8 nonstop from Tokyo, Japan to Wilmington, Delaware in 12 hours and 25 minutes.

Capitol accumulated over a dozen Lockheed L-1049 Super Constellations in the 1960s. Capitol's exit from the type was accelerated by reduced military demand for Vietnam War freight flights in 1967, which fell most heavily on piston aircraft, consistent with US military policy favoring turbine equipment. By December 1967, four L-1049Hs, previously employed for the military, were sitting at Capitol's Delaware base with "no prospects for further use of the fully depreciated aircraft." The L-1049s were out of the fleet by year-end 1968. C-46s remained, because Capitol flew three and then five on wet lease in Europe for Lufthansa 1964–1969. By 1970, Capitol had a pure DC-8 fleet.

Table 2: Capitol Airways^{(1)} financial results, 1961–1970(1) From 1967, Capitol International Airways (2) Versus other supplemental air carriers
USD 000	1961	1962	1963	1964	1965	1966	1967	1968	1969	1970
Operating revenue:										
Military charter	9,817	14,911	12,616	10,002	9,008	18,129	16,473	13,821	15,309	13,874
Civilian charter	2,969	2,539	2,456	5,636	10,126	11,237	13,622	25,794	27,458	25,624
Scheduled	377	1,352	273	1,540						
Other	239	106	57	219	117	418	457	1,510	388	148
Total	13,401	18,907	15,402	17,397	19,252	29,784	30,553	41,125	43,155	39,646
Op profit (loss)	207	504	216	1,956	1,297	5,750	4,319	4,790	1,519	(330)
Net profit (loss)	62	(34)	(48)	1,244	1,185	2,296	1,938	3,485	(150)	(1,147)
Op margin (%)	1.5	2.7	1.4	11.2	6.7	19.3	14.1	11.6	3.5	-0.8
Operating revenue:										
% of industry^{(2)}	16.3	17.7	16.7	16.4	13.7	14.2	11.8	12.6	11.9	11.8
Industry^{(2)} rank	2	2	2	3	4	4	4	4	5	5

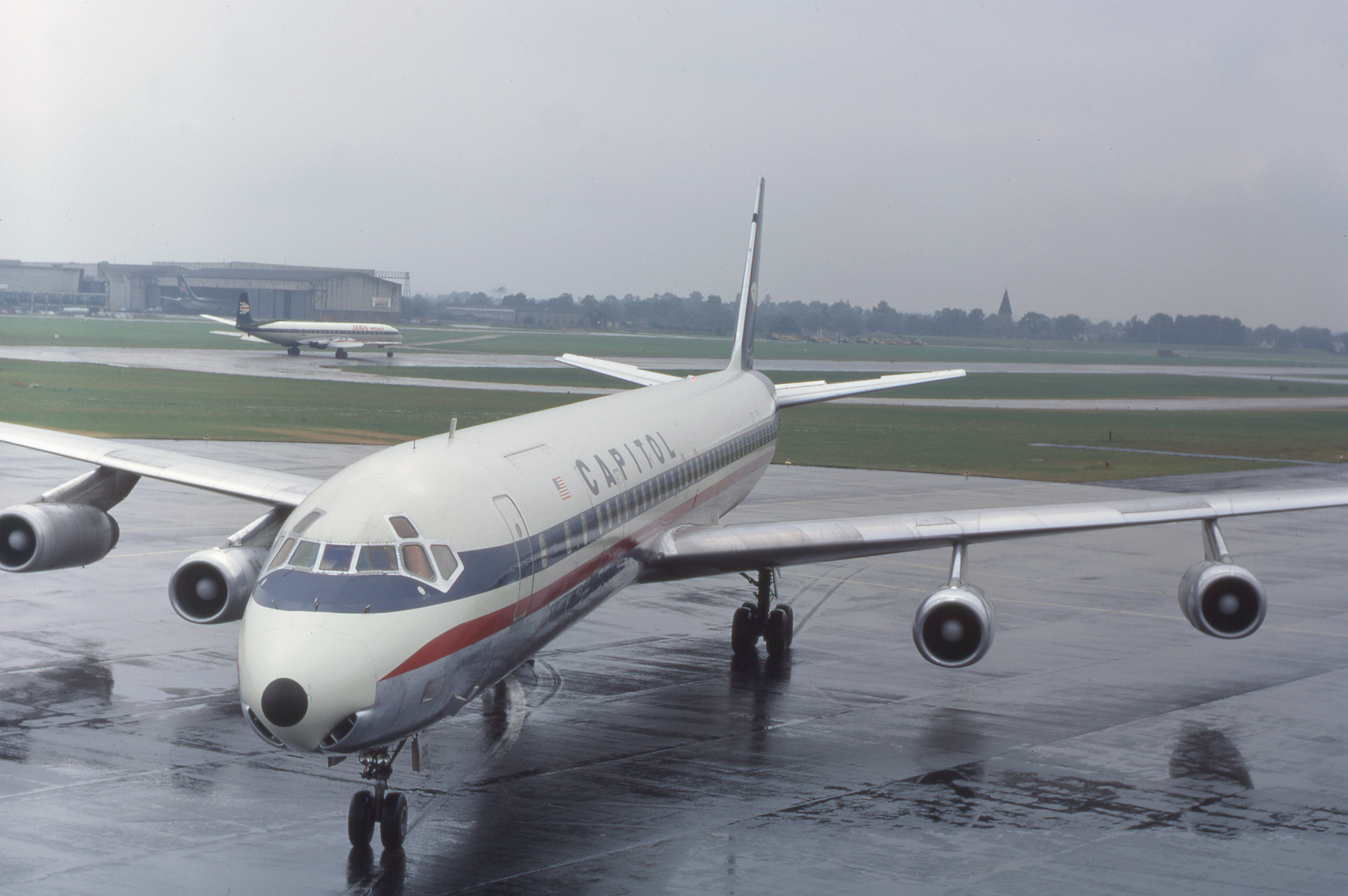
DC-8-63CF Gatwick 1973

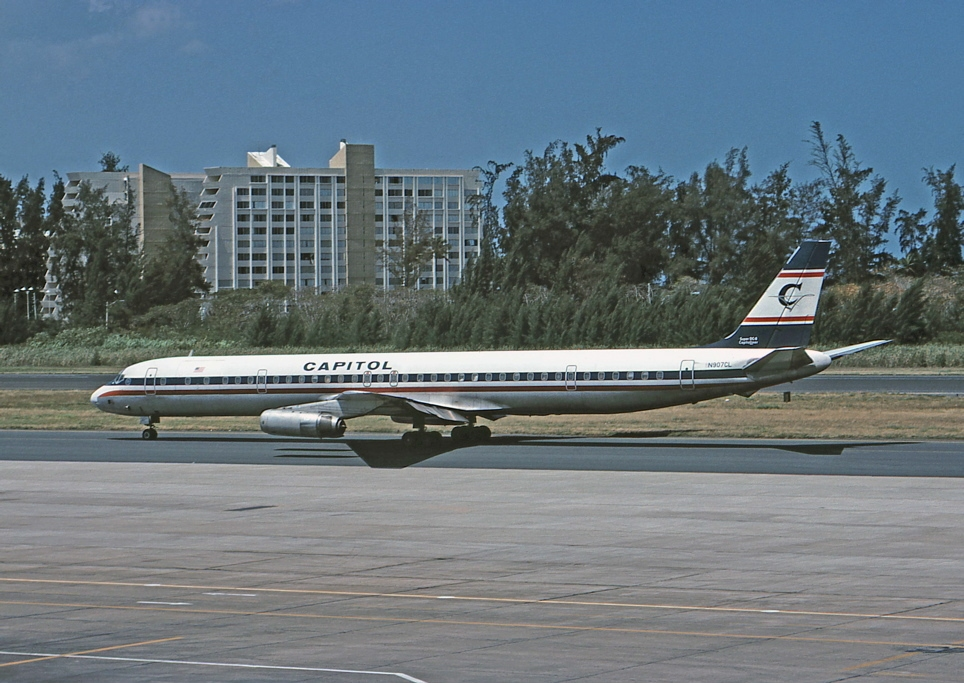
DC-8-63CF San Juan 1978

=== Public company and Atlantic charter carrier ===
On 17 March 1967, the airline changed its legal name to Capitol International Airways, a name it had used for business purposes since at least 1961. Later the same month, Capitol filed an initial public offering, completing it in May, becoming a public company. In July 1969, conglomerate City Investing agreed to buy Capitol, with an offer that expired at year end (buying such carriers was in fashion: The Hillman Company bought American Flyers in 1967, and in 1968, investment bank Stephens bought Purdue Aeronautics, insurance company Transamerica Corporation bought Trans International and INA Corp., also an insurance company, offered to buy World Airways). In January 1970, with CAB approval incomplete, City Investing walked away. As Table 2 shows, Capitol's 1969 operating margins dropped significantly vs the prior three years. In 1971, Capitol consolidated operations and headquarters to Smyrna, Tennessee, at the recently-closed Sewart Air Force Base (today's Smyrna Airport) southeast of Nashville.

By 1972, charters to Europe were a dominant part (73%) of Capitol's commercial business, similar to the other four (Trans International, Overseas National, World Airways and Saturn Airways) of the so-called Big Five charter carriers. Capitol's civil business now dominated military (see Table 3). Charters accounted for 32% of all Atlantic passengers at the time. In 1973–1974, the US govt sought to prop up Pan Am, which was losing a lot of money, especially on the Atlantic. The Department of Transportation (DOT) asked carriers to raise transatlantic fares, including charter rates. Capitol refused, noting it was making money, charter rates were going up of their own accord and Pan Am's issues were of its own making. The DOT identified Capitol as the "recalcitrant carrier" preventing a "voluntary" agreement. In response, the CAB imposed minimum charter rates. Backlash was immediate and the CAB order was suspended by a court injunction. In late 1974, Senator Ted Kennedy held hearings on the issue, the first of a series of such hearings on airline regulation that in retrospect were seen as starting a process that ended in the 1978 Airline Deregulation Act.

Table 3: Capitol International Airways financial results, 1971–1978(1) Versus other supplemental air carriers
USD 000	1971	1972	1973	1974	1975	1976	1977	1978
Operating revenue:								
Military charter	8,286		10,237	6,947	8,770	4,659	5,571	4,928
Civilian charter	30,716	27,341	33,943	40,246	32,861	45,602	74,389	80,083
Other	133		172	675	2,342	1,627	993	1,704
Total	39,135	38,587	44,353	47,867	43,973	51,889	80,945	86,715
Op profit (loss)	(1,619)	182	(886)	1,382	131	1,174	(175)	(2,995)
Net profit (loss)	(2,542)		755	(551)	1,624	2,941	299	(1,754)
Op margin (%)	-4.1	0.5	-2.0	2.9	0.3	2.3	-0.2	-3.5
Operating revenue:								
% of industry^{(1)}	10.8	11.7	11.9	11.2	10.2	12.4	15.7	16.4
Industry^{(1)} rank	5	5	5	5	5	5	4	3

=== Deregulation and demise ===
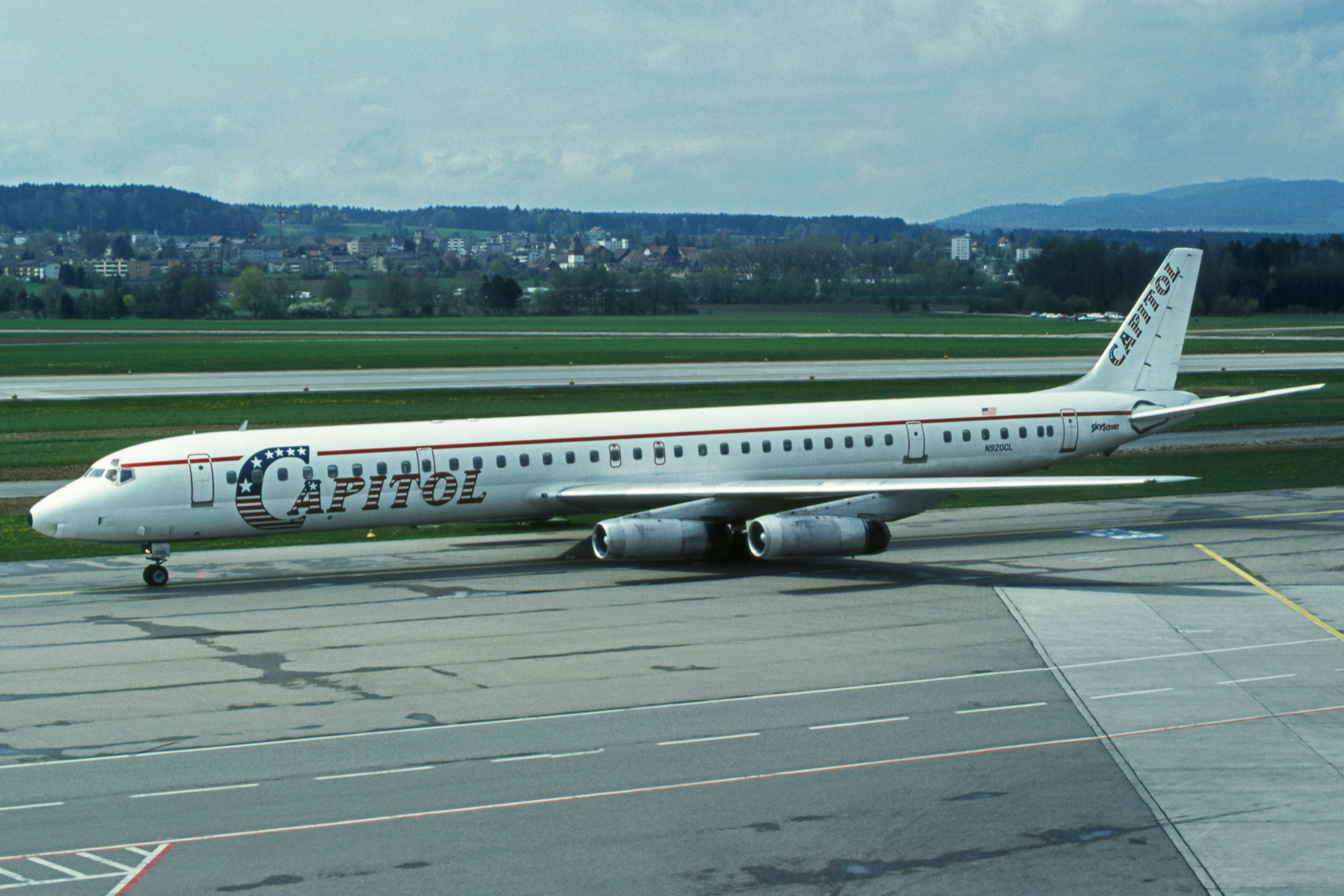
DC-8-63CF Zurich 1982. In 1985 this aircraft crashed as Arrow Air Flight 1285R

A300 Chicago September 1984

As shown in Table 3, Capitol ended the final year of regulated era (1978) as the third largest supplemental by revenue, but its advancement from number five earlier in the 1970s in part reflected Saturn's 1976 merger into Trans International and Overseas National's September 1978 liquidation.

Capitol entered deregulation still reliant on a fleet of DC-8s and suffered the March 1979 death of its founder Jesse Stallings, and the April 1980 death of Mack Rowe, Stallings's long-time lieutenant (at the airline since 1946) and successor as Chairman. Capitol's first scheduled service was in May 1979 from New York to Brussels, at which time the airline intended to remain mostly a charter carrier for the foreseeable future. However, by 1980 it was already mostly a scheduled carrier by revenue (see Table 4), largely long-haul service (see Destinations).

The CAB cited the recent deaths of Stallings and Rowe in approving George E. Batchelor's 1980 acquisition of 52% stake for $3.6 million (about $14 million in 2025 terms), which closed in July. Like Stallings, Batchelor was a World War II Air Transport Command veteran who also founded an irregular carrier in 1946, Arrow Airways. The CAB shut Arrow Airways in 1951 for operating illegal scheduled services but with deregulation Batchelor was back in the industry, funded by his aircraft leasing and maintenance ventures. Batchelor paid only a bit over $1 million in cash for his stake, the rest being taken back as a note.

Batchelor's control lasted until January 1983 when he stopped paying on the note used to fund his Capitol stake and stepped down from management. Batchelor later said Capitol Air was "one of the worst [investments] I ever had." The airline made a profit in 1981 (Table 4) and on 6 January 1982, Capitol again changed names, this time to Capitol Air. Batchelor also brought the first widebody aircraft to Capitol, with McDonnell Douglas DC-10-10s in the fleet from 1981 to 1983. But Batchelor was dissuaded by heavy 1982 losses, which resulted in Capitol making a going concern disclosure by its accountants in May 1983. In June, most of Batchelor's former stake was sold to a new group, New York based Retlaw Capitol Associates, which in turn sold out its majority stake in September to a group led by Farhad Azima, who also controlled Global International Airways. Operating margins worsened in 1983. In February 1984, New York City entrepreneur John Catsimatidis took a stake in Azima's Capitol holding company. The end came in November 1984 after employees, frustrated at not being paid, forced the airline into Chapter 11 at which point operations ceased. Capitol's liabilities (at $64 million) were more than twice its assets ($30 million).

Table 4: Capitol International Airways^{(1)} financial results, 1979–1984(1) Capitol Air from 1982 (2) First half only
USD 000	1979	1980	1981	1982	1983	1984^{(2)}
Operating revenue:						
Charter	77,302	45,618	37,647	35,661	16,809	9,161
Scheduled	10,606	62,487	143,730	224,776	156,267	67,596
Other	6,503	5,618	3,658	6,757	4,181	1,796
Total	94,407	113,723	185,035	267,194	177,257	78,553
Op income	(7,030)	(3,393)	4,509	(12,965)	(10,717)	(628)
Net income	(3,389)	(5,360)	2,047	(21,203)	(11,147)	(1,567)
Op margin (%)	-7.4	-3.0	2.4	-4.9	-6.0	-0.8
Scheduled as % of total revenue	11.2	54.9	77.7	84.1	88.2	86.1

Capitol Air Express
IATA	ICAO	Call sign
C6	CEX	CAPITOL EXPRESS
- Founded: 4 May 1992 incorporated in Delaware
- Commenced operations: 1993
- Ceased operations: 1996
- Headquarters: Reston, Virginia; United States
- Founders: John Catsimatidis

== Capitol Air Express ==
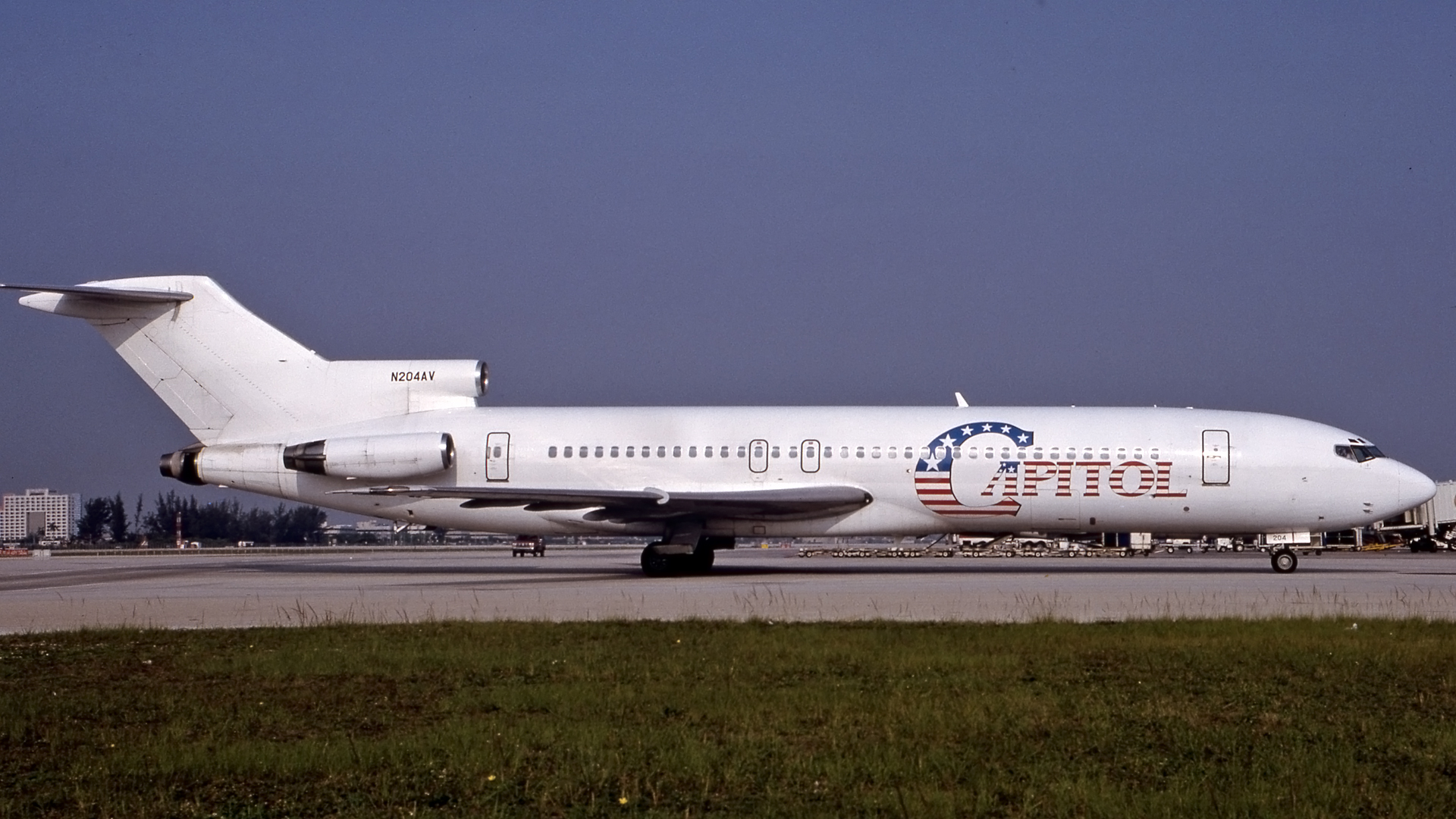
Capitol Air Express Boeing 727-200 at Miami in the 1990s

John Catsimatidis applied for a certificate for Capital Air Express (CAE) in 1992. He attempted to buy the certificate from bankrupt and non-operational Braniff III to speed the process, but the Federal Aviation Administration said the Braniff III certificate could not be transferred. CAE received its own charter certificate at the end of 1992. CAE appears to have flown only charters, though in 1993 it applied for and apparently received authority to operate as a scheduled carrier. The airline operated Boeing 727s, with records of one Boeing 727-100 and ten Boeing 727-200s on its certificate, some only for months at a time.

== Destinations ==
November 5, 1981:

- Boston
- Brussels
- Chicago
- Frankfurt
- Los Angeles
- Miami
- Newark
- New York JFK
- Puerto Plata
- San Francisco
- San Juan
- Zurich

== Fleet ==
1953:

- 3 Douglas DC-3
- 2 Curtiss C-46

December 1963:

- 1 Douglas DC-8-54F
- 5 Armstrong Whitworth AW.650 Argosy
- 14 Lockheed L-1049 Super Constellation
- 16 Curtiss C-46 Commando
- 1 Douglas DC-3

December 1967:

- 6 Douglas DC-8
- 12 Lockheed L-1049 Super Constellation
- 4 Curtiss C-46

August 1971:

- 4 Douglas DC-8-63CF
- 3 Douglas DC-8-55F
- 1 Douglas DC-8-32

World Airline Fleets 1979 (copyright 1979) shows Capitol International Airways with:

- 2 Douglas DC-8-31
- 3 Douglas DC-8-33
- 5 Douglas DC-8-61
- 2 Douglas DC-8-63CF

25 November 1984:

- 2 Boeing 727-200
- 4 Douglas DC-8

Capitol also operated the following types during its existence:

- Airbus A300B4 (see External links)
- Douglas DC-4
- Lockheed Model 18 Lodestar
- McDonnell Douglas DC-10-10 (see External links)

== Accidents ==
- 2 April 1955 – C-46A registration N51424 flying for Logair disappeared flying from Mobile to Warner Robins Air Force Base with wreckage later washing up on beaches and other parts found by diving. The cause was never determined, but weather was poor at the time, including thunderstorms and turbulence. The two crew were presumed dead. (Note: As of 28 November 2024, the references reflect Aviation Safety Network listing this accident as being AAXICO Airlines, but the Civil Aeronautics Board (the investigating body) report and contemporaneous reporting clearly says it is Capitol.)
- 16 November 1958 – C-46F registration N1301N enroute Denver to Hill Air Force Base in Ogden, Utah suffered a right engine failure in IFR conditions. The aircraft crashed and burned at an elevation of 8,700 ft near Fort Collins, Colorado, killing the two pilots on board. See External links for a picture of this aircraft.
- 4 October 1960 – C-46F registration N4719N was on night-time final approach to McClellan Air Force Base on a flight from Travis Air Force Base, when the crew felt an impact and saw a flash. The Capitol aircraft landed safely and found a dent in a flap. The C-46 had impacted a Cessna, which crashed and exploded, killing the two on board. The Cessna had been engaged in an unauthorized night-time landing.
- 15 October 1960 – C-46F registration N1300N in-bound from Rapid City, South Dakota to Hill Air Force Base in Ogden, Utah was making a simulated ILS approach when the right wing separated due to metal fatigue of certain bolts, leading to destruction of the aircraft after crashing at 6,500 ft elevation, and the death of the two crew on board.
- 22 January 1961 – C-46F registration N1308V suffered an uncontrollable engine fire near Katy, Texas on an Air Force Logair flight from Kelly Air Force Base in San Antonio, Texas to Mobile, Alabama. The fire was traced to fatigue failure of bolts in an engine. There was evidence fire suppression was attempted unsuccessfully, but the fire burned the engine and wing off the aircraft, destroying the aircraft and killing the two crew. See External links for a picture of this aircraft.
- 13 September 1967 – C-46F registration N1309V suffered an engine flameout after takeoff from Kingston, Jamaica en route to Fort Lauderdale, resulting in a ditching. Four people on board the aircraft were unharmed, but the aircraft was lost.
- 28 April 1968 – DC-8-31 registration N1802 crashed at Atlantic City, New Jersey on a training flight. The crew attempted a two-engine approach and touch-and-go and lost control as they applied power. All four crew members survived.
- 27 November 1970 – Capitol International Airways Flight C2C3/26, a DC-8-63CF registration N4909C, overran the runway while attempting to take off at Anchorage, Alaska en route to Yokota Air Base, Japan. For reasons that could not be determined, all eight main landing gear wheels remained locked during takeoff, preventing reaching sufficient take off speed. 47 of 229 passengers and crew were killed.
- 2 October 1977 – Shannon Airport, Ireland. DC-8-61 N911CL en-route Rome-Windsor Locks aborted takeoff after a fire. A main landing gear tyre shredded on takeoff, rupturing fuel tanks, causing a fire under the left wing. The tower spotted the fire as did the crew of a sister aircraft that had just arrived. Takeoff was abandoned at V1, the DC-8 stopped just short of the end of the runway. 50 passengers were injured but there were no fatalities. Although significantly damaged, the aircraft was returned to service. Had the aircraft become airborne, the outcome likely would have been far worse.

Additionally, on three occasions between May and August 1983, the airline's flight 236 from San Juan, Puerto Rico to Miami was hijacked to Cuba. In all instances, the hijacker was taken into custody uneventfully.

== See also ==
- Logair
- Supplemental air carrier
- List of defunct airlines of the United States
