= Logair =

US domestic military cargo virtual airline (1954–1992)

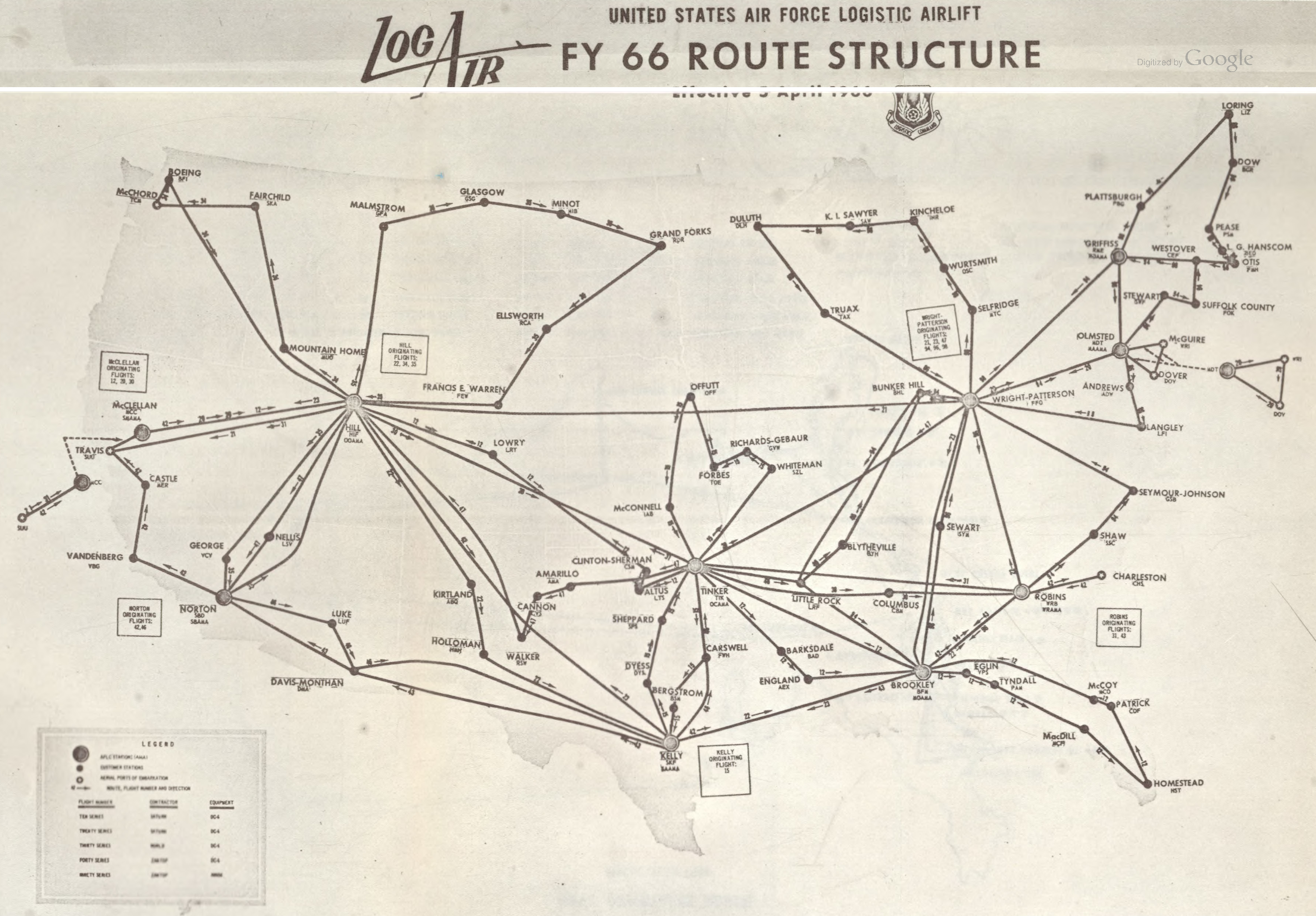
- FY1966 network. That year, AAXICO, World and Zantop flew DC-6As for Logair, Zantop also flew AW.650s. Note logo, also visible on nose of ONA DC-9 in a photo below.
IATA	ICAO	Call sign
—	—	LOGAIR
- Founded: April 1954
- Commenced operations: April 1954
- Ceased operations: 30 September 1992
- Fleet size: see Fleet below
- Destinations: see Destinations below
- Parent company: United States; Air Force
- Headquarters: Wright-Patterson; Air Force Base

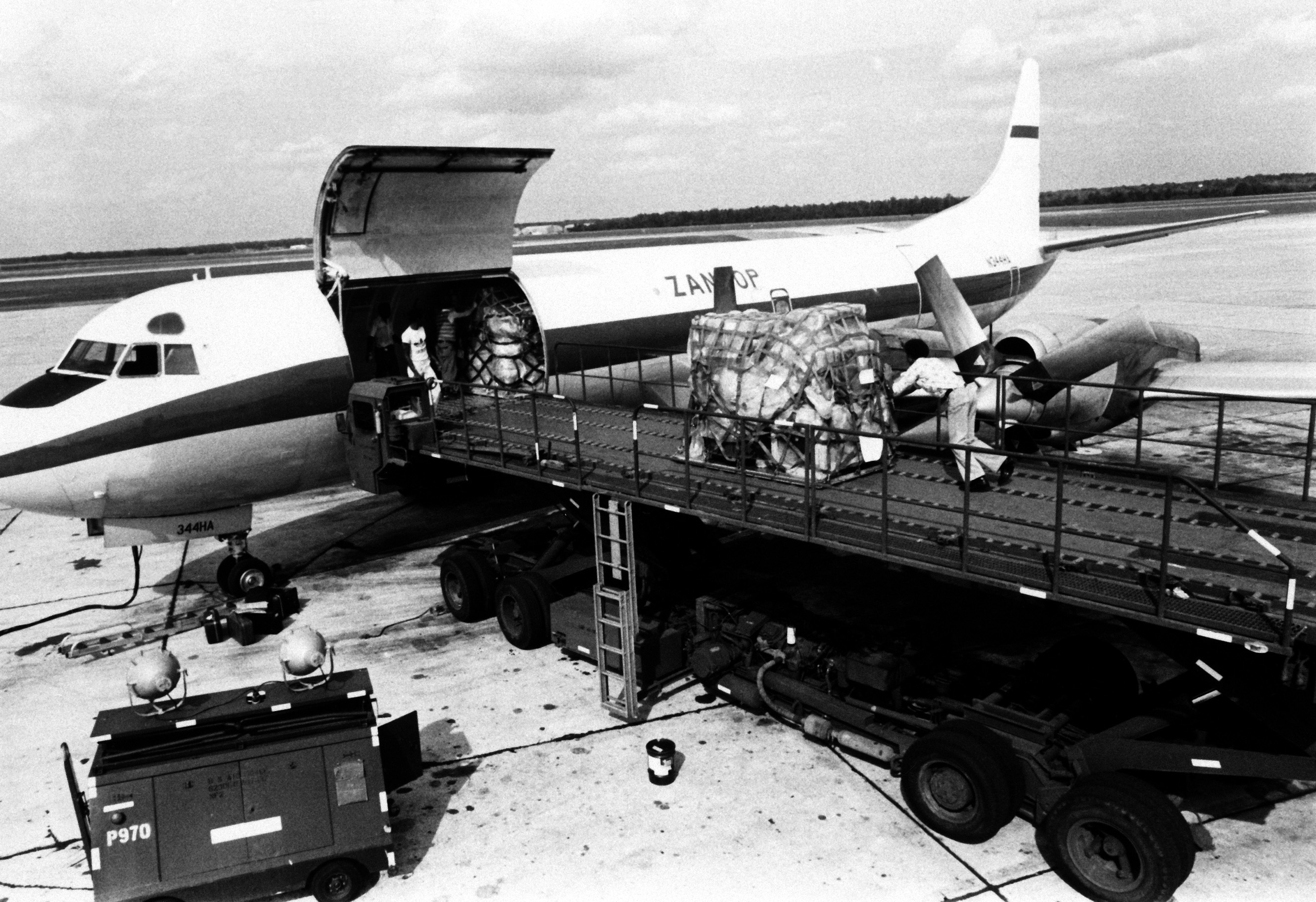
Zantop International Airlines Electra at Warner Robins Air Logistics Center in Logair service 1981

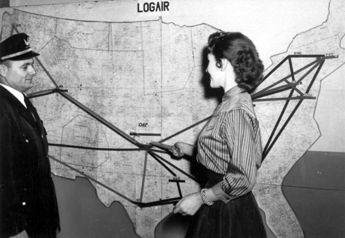
"Directing Logair supply flights" Tinker Air Force Base, mid-1950s

Logair (1954–1992), short for Logistic Airlift, was a domestic United States Air Force virtual airline that contracted carriers to fly cargo between Air Force bases, initially under the aegis of the Air Materiel Command (AMC) (not to be confused with Air Mobility Command). The program was first called Mercury Service but American Airlines then used the same name for coast-to-coast flights, so this quickly changed. Logair was a key source of demand for early US airfreight carriers, some of which became Logair specialists. Over time, its relative importance to the airline industry faded. The program was a victim of post-Cold War spending cuts and availability of robust commercial networks such as FedEx. The US Navy ran a similar service called Quicktrans (1950–1994).

== History ==
=== Startup and early days ===
Mercury Service started April 1954 with contract awards to irregular air carriers (later known as supplemental air carriers) AAXICO Airlines and Capitol Airways for six C-46 aircraft each. By August the name changed to Logair. Later that year, Logair awarded Resort Airlines a contract to fly DC-4s. Logair was similar to the Navy Quicktrans program started in 1950, but also formalized earlier Air Force air freight tests, such as "Project Skyway", which airlifted B-36 R-4360 radial engines to Pratt & Whitney, materially reducing time out of service. Similarly, air transport of jet engines cut out-of-service time from 135 days to 75 days, freeing 28 engines for use.

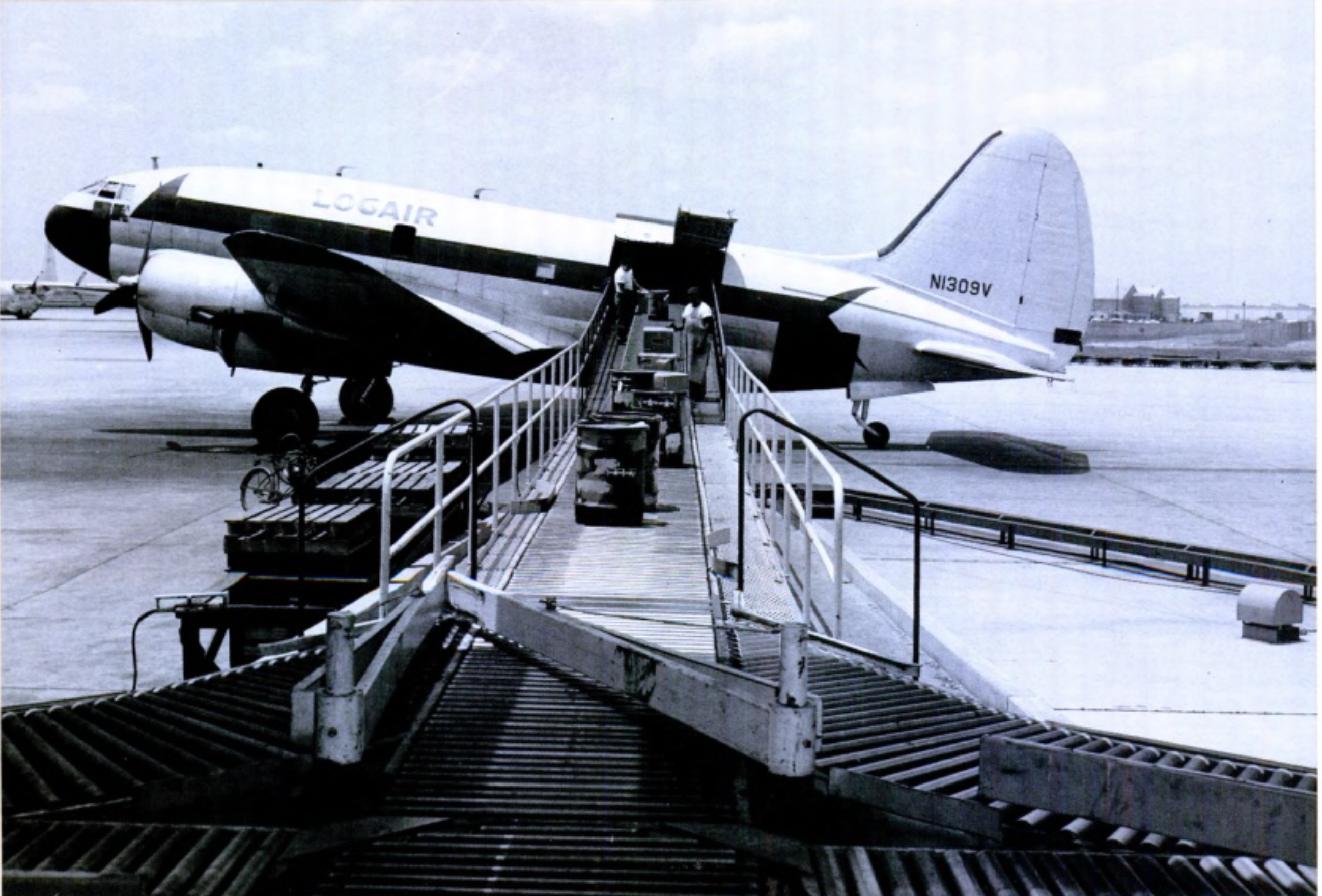
Capitol Airways C-46 at Kelly Air Force Base sometime in late 1950s/early 1960s

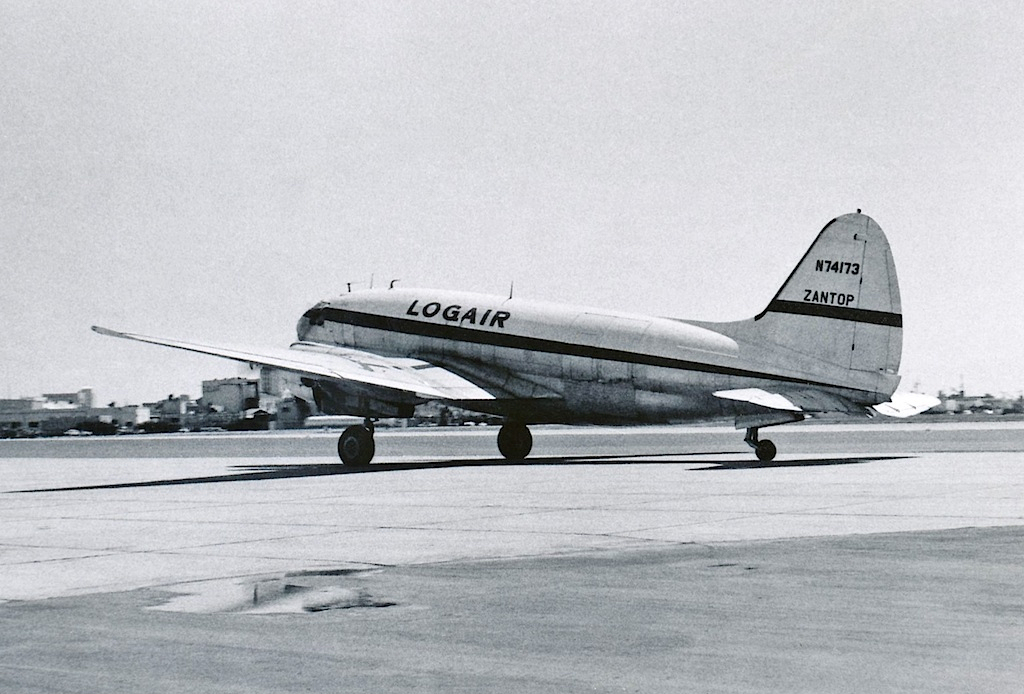
Zantop Air Transport C-46 1962

Logair was a large source of revenue for cargo and supplemental airlines, the two airline types that tended to dominate bidding. Fiscal 1957 Logair payments were $18 million ($21.5 million including Quicktrans). In the same period, total scheduled cargo airline revenue was $70.0 million, and that of supplementals $56.8 million. (Note: Referenced statistics are mislabeled as being for year ending September but are really June. Noncertificated (supplemental) air carrier statistics trailed by a quarter versus certificated (scheduled) airlines in Civil Aeronautics Board (CAB) reports of the time. The preceding June CAB report contained March statistics for noncertificated airlines. The succeeding December CAB report contained September statistics for noncertificated airlines. The September report purports to contain non-certificated statistics for September but by comparison with the earlier and later reports they are clearly June.) Logair awarded annual contracts for the federal government fiscal year (initially ending June; after 1977, ending September) initially based on competitive bidding for one or more "patterns" of service. For instance, in 1956, AMC solicited bids for five patterns for FY1957, one for DC-4s, the others for C-46s. Airline participation changed with the number of bids won from year to year, with the margin of victory sometimes less than a thousand dollars on bids totalling millions. Aircraft working for Logair were initially marked as such (see photo; External links has other photos) and could swap airlines. For instance, in 1960, AAXICO, by then a pure Logair specialist, lost its contract. It leased 25 C-46s to a winning bidder and ceased operations completely for twelve months, resuming when it won a contract the next year. In 1957, a new entity, the Military Traffic Management Agency, took over Logair and Quicktrans bidding, but the Air Force and Navy retained operational control.

=== Turbine transition and Vietnam ===
In 1960, competitive bidding for military charters (including Logair) came to an end. Instead, the Civil Aeronautics Board (CAB; a now-defunct federal agency that, at the time, tightly regulated almost all US commercial air transport) set military charter rates, with the military allocating contracts by participation in the Civil Reserve Air Fleet (CRAF). The military measured an airline's CRAF participation by the mobilization value (MV) of aircraft enrolled in CRAF, with MV reflecting an aircraft's value to the military. Domestic and international CRAF were separate. International CRAF emphasized long-range jets, particularly jets convertible between passengers and cargo. Domestic CRAF aircraft were generally smaller, often turboprops. The greater an airline's MV of aircraft committed to domestic CRAF, the more its Logair/Quicktrans allocation.

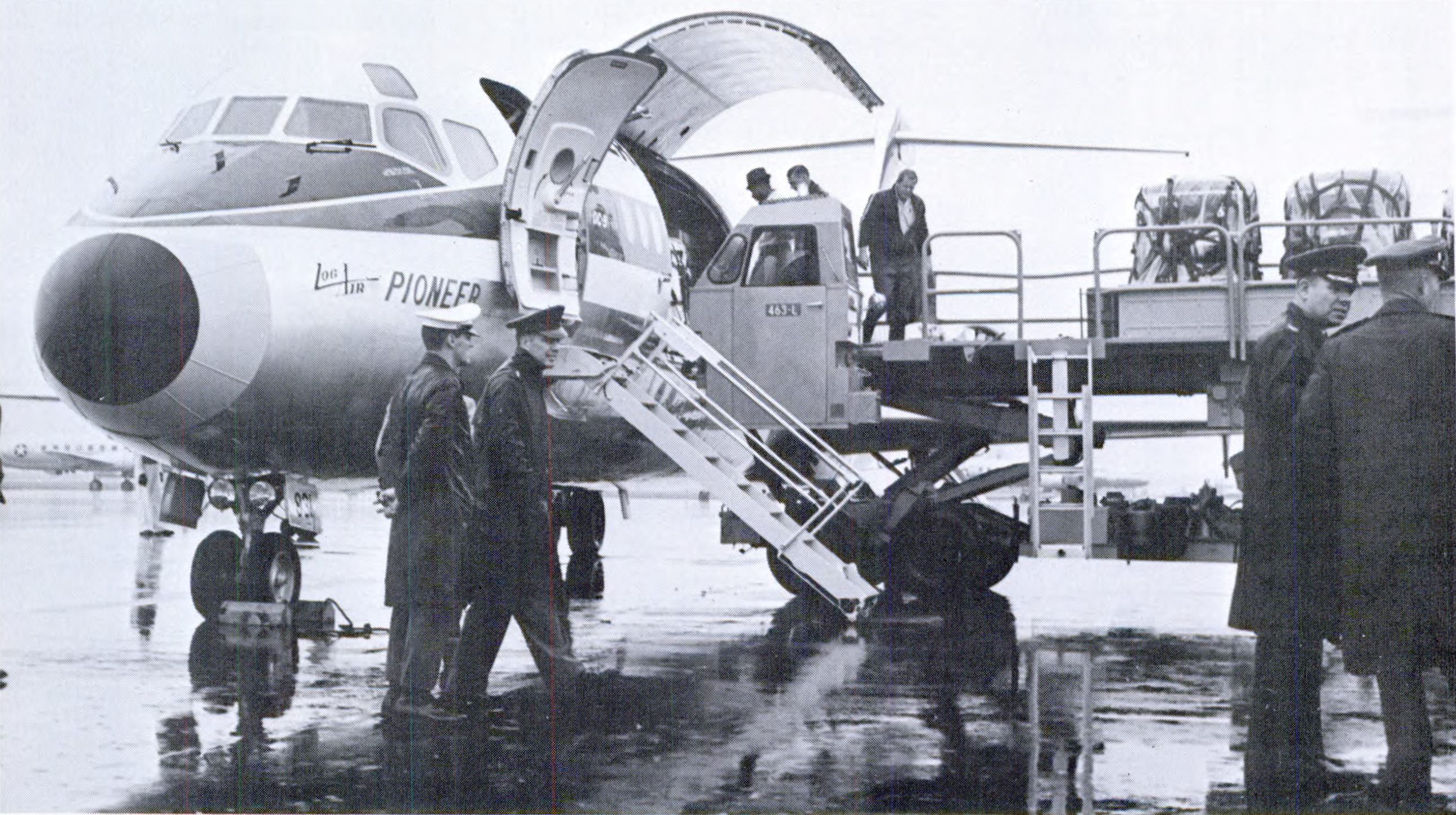
ONA DC-9-30CF Wright-Patterson Air Force Base 1967–1968. Note small Logair logo just forward of "Pioneer"

Also in 1960, the Air Force started to reserve some patterns for aircraft capable of outsized loads, focusing on the Armstrong Whitworth AW.650 Argosy and a proposed civil version of the Lockheed C-130 Hercules, which would become the Lockheed L-100 Hercules. Riddle Airlines (the future Airlift International) started flying the Argosy for Logair in January 1961. Congress wanted turbine equipment, despite testimony by Saturn Airways and World Airways about the better economics of fully-depreciated, reliable and flexible DC-6s. Jet speed was irrelevant for a system with a 382-mile average flight length. Nonetheless, Overseas National Airways started flying DC-9s for Logair in 1967. By 1969, Logair added Lockheed L-100 Hercules and Lockheed L-188 Electras. In 1970, the turbine requirement forced the Navy to outsource a Quicktrans route to Logair as Quicktrans did not have the equipment.

As the 1960s progressed, Logair became a sideshow, as international military charters soared due to Vietnam. As Table 1 shows, in 1961, Logair and Quicktrans together accounted for over 50% of military cargo charter spending and over 25% of all military charters (including passenger), but by the end of the decade, Logair and Quicktrans were overshadowed. In FY1968, US flag carrier Pan Am alone was awarded just shy of $100 million in international military charters (over $900 million in 2025 terms), more than twice total Logair and Quicktrans contracts. Table 1 also demonstrates how supplemental carriers dominated Logair: of Logair carriers listed, all were supplementals except for Airlift International and Slick Airways, which were scheduled cargo airlines.

Also, in April 1961, the Air Materiel Command became the Air Force Logistics Command (AFLC), the new parent organization of Logair.

Table 1: Logair and Quicktrans awards, Fiscal Year 1961–1969Carriers in Bold Italic are supplemental air carriers(1) AAXICO merged into Saturn November 1965(2) Airlift Intl (known as Riddle Airlines until March 1963) acquired the assets of Slick June 1966(3) Changed name from Zantop Air Transport December 1966
USD millions / YE June 30:	1961	1962	1963	1964	1965	1966	1967	1968	1969
Logair:									
AAXICO Airlines^{(1)}		7.8	7.3	8.4	9.3				
Airlift International^{(2)}	5.0	10.9	3.9	4.2	0.1	0.3	0.5	0.8	
Capitol Airways	10.6	2.6	7.2	6.5	3.8				
Overseas National								6.0	13.3
Saturn Airways^{(1)}						11.1	12.9	17.2	9.9
Slick Airways^{(2)}					6.1				
Southern Air								0.3	
Universal Airlines^{(3)}	5.3	3.2	6.4	8.2	11.4	12.0	10.1	6.5	6.3
World Airways	4.5	4.8	5.5	4.1		5.4	5.7	0.1	2.6
Logair total	25.3	29.2	30.3	31.4	30.7	28.8	29.3	31.0	32.1
Quicktrans:									
Airlift International^{(2)}								0.3	0.1
Alaska Airlines								0.0	
Flying Tiger Lines						3.0			
Slick Airways^{(2)}		6.5	7.8	8.9	7.9				
US Overseas	5.2								
Universal Airlines^{(3)}						6.6	10.2	11.7	12.4
Quicktrans total	5.2	6.5	7.7	8.9	7.9	9.5	10.2	12.0	12.5
All military cargo charters	55.2	101.4	101.2	86.4	120.7	165.7	321.1	241.3	187.3
All military charters	112.5	179.8	206.1	186.9	235.1	357.7	617.0	617.3	573.7
Logair + Quicktrans as % of all military cargo charter	55.2	35.2	37.6	46.7	32.0	23.1	12.3	17.8	23.8
Logair + Quicktrans as % of all military charter	27.1	19.9	18.5	21.6	16.4	10.7	6.4	7.0	7.8

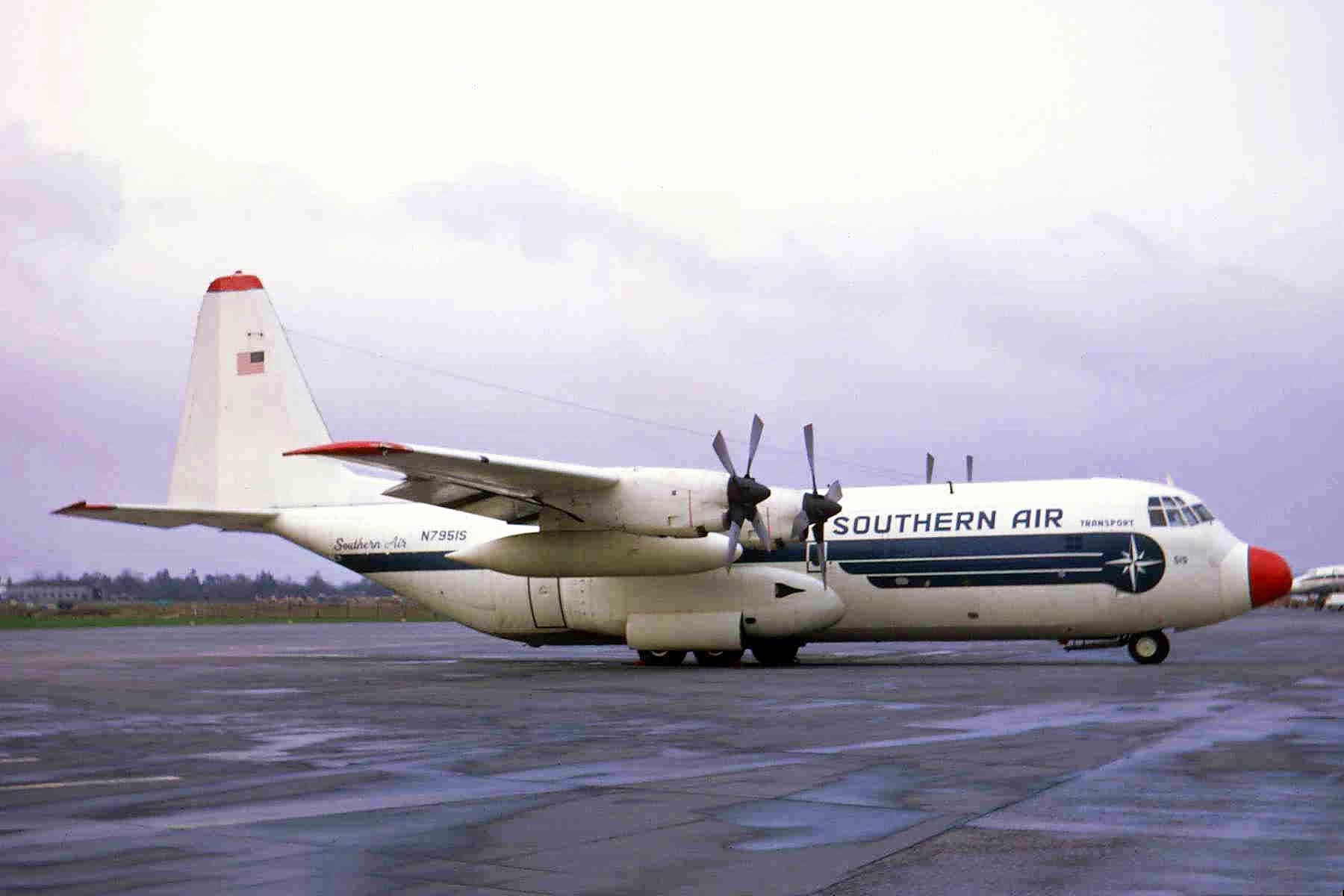
When, in 1973, it was revealed the CIA secretly owned Southern Air Transport, the airline was blocked from Logair. CIA-era Hercules at London Gatwick 1970

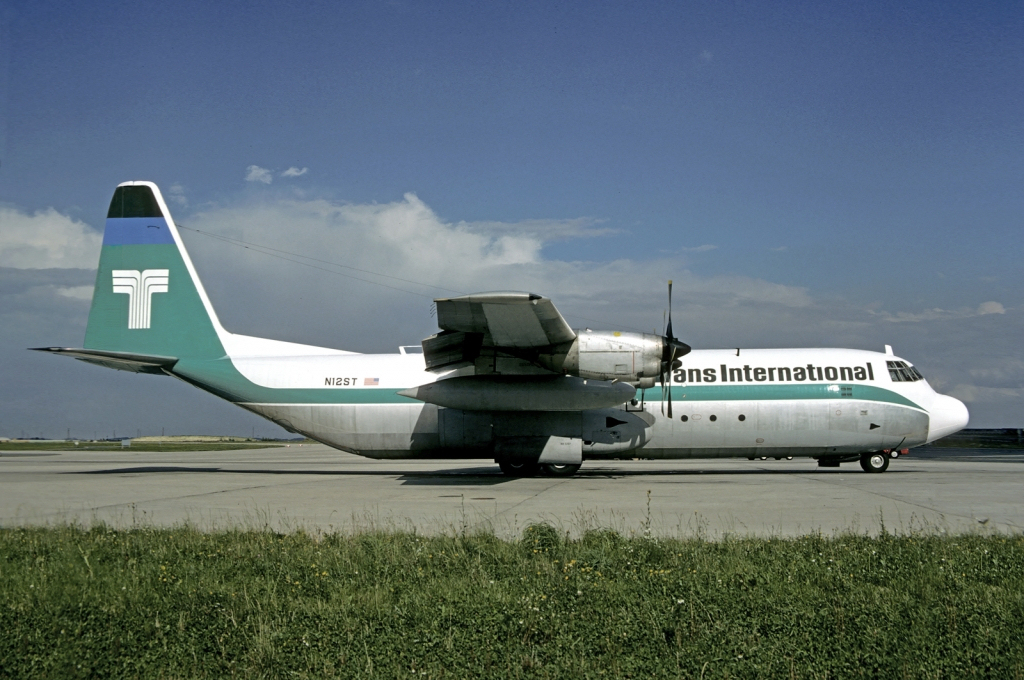
Trans Intl got into Logair by buying Saturn in 1976, and stayed a contractor until its parent liquidated it (then named Transamerica) in 1986. The Hercules side of the business went to Southern Air Transport

=== 1970s: diminished competition and the CIA ===
Logair competition diminished substantially in the 1970s:

- By 1970, Capitol and World shifted their fleets to long-haul aircraft Logair didn't use.
- Airlift International made an effort to compete for Logair business by acquiring Lockheed L-100 Hercules, but could not finance them, so sold them and its Logair business to Saturn in 1970.
- Universal collapsed in 1972. Saturn took over Universal's Logair contract and Electra fleet.
- Overseas National Airways (ONA) got out of Electras by year-end 1974 and DC-9s by 1976.
- In 1973, Southern Air Transport (SAT), which had three Hercules, was, for the first time, awarded a portion of the Logair contract (for FY1974). This was seen by some as the last straw in a scandal over the CIA's secret ownership of SAT. By year end, SAT gave up its Logair contract and its CAB certification (so it was no longer a common carrier and thus ineligible for government contracts).

In 1977, when the CAB certificated Zantop International Airlines (ZIA; a separate airline from the earlier Zantop Air Transport) and recertificated Southern Air Transport (sold by the CIA at year end 1973) as supplemental air carriers, a significant motivation was to create competition for Logair and Quicktrans. Only two carriers, ONA and Saturn, participated in Logair/Quicktrans in fiscal years 1973 thru 1976, and Saturn took over 75% of the combined business in 1975 thru 1977. The Air Force recognized that reduced interest was a problem. One issue was lower rates. In 1979, in the wake of the 1978 Airline Deregulation Act, the CAB eliminated fixed military charter rates, as established in the early 1960s. Military charter prices were once again set by negotiation between the military and the airlines. Another issue was that aircraft types best suited for Logair were not those most airlines flew (the Air Force also required they be specially equipped; see Operational features below). The Air Force noted the only aircraft competitive with the Electra for Logair was the DC-9. And for outsized cargo, nothing was competitive with the Hercules. Also, on a relative basis Logair was no longer a big program. in Fiscal Year 1979, Logair and Quicktrans together accounted for $55 million in airlift contracts (over $240 million in 2025 dollars). In 1979, freight revenues for the scheduled airlines were $2.2 billion, 40 times as much.

==== Hawaiian ====
Hawaiian Airlines made two brief appearances as a Logair contractor in the late 1970s. Hawaiian established Hawaiian Air Cargo to fly for Logair in 1976, leasing Electras from ZIA. Hawaiian Air Cargo was based in Macon, Georgia (near Warner-Robins Air Force Base, part of the Logair network). ZIA retrieved its Electras in 1977, leaving Hawaiian out of the Logair contract. In 1978 Hawaiian sourced more Electras and tried again. This was unprofitable and in 1980 Hawaiian sold everything to ZIA. Hawaiian was one of the few scheduled passenger airlines to participate in Logair.

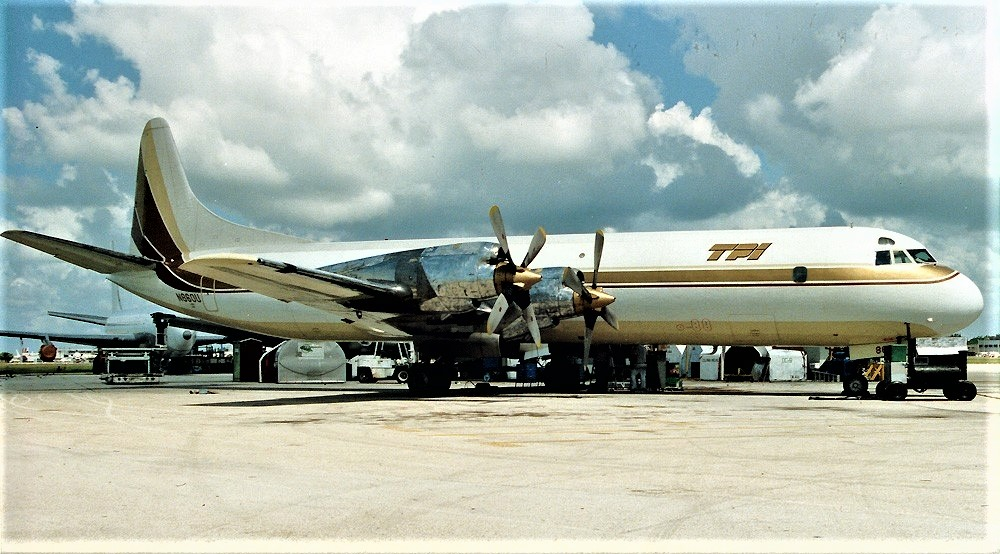
Miami 1989. Electras were a Logair staple. N860U spent 20 yrs at contractors Universal, Saturn, Trans Intl, Interstate and TPI Intl. In 1971 the CAB thought it unrealistic for Electras to last even to 1980

=== 1980s to 1992 ===
The deregulated era (1979 onward) saw new entrant airlines make appearances as Logair contractors:

- Interstate Airlines
- CAM Air International
- Spirit of America Airlines
- TPI International Airways
- Express One International
- Kitty Hawk Air Cargo

However, Trans International Airlines (TIA), which bought Saturn in 1976, was a Logair contractor through its decision to liquidate in 1986 (when it was known as Transamerica Airlines). TIA was a monopoly provider of Lockheed L-100 Hercules aircraft to the Logair program through 1983 (when Southern Air Transport (SAT) joined the program). TIA's Hercules monopoly was noted in 1977 by the CAB and again by Air Force researchers in 1981. When Transamerica liquidated in 1986, SAT took over Transamerica's Hercules and that monopoly.

Other long-time Logair contractors included Zantop International, which was present from 1977 (FY1978) through 1991. Evergreen first made an appearance in FY1977 and was present in the final year (FY1992) These long-term Logair contractors, Evergreen, SAT, TIA/Transamerica and Zantop were all former supplemental air carriers with pre-deregulation roots.

==== End ====
After the Gulf War, at the dawn of the post-Cold War era, Logair restructured around a two hub concept, "Logair 92", centered on Hill Air Force Base in Utah and Warner Robins in Georgia. But the Air Force shut down Logair after a year at the end of FY1992, saying this would save $80 million a year. A year later, General Merrill McPeak, Air Force Chief of Staff, said Logair had "lingered on long after its economic justification disappeared."

== Operational features ==
Ground handling was done by USAF personnel (this was different from Quicktrans, where ground handling was performed by vendors, initially the contracted carrier). Space utilization regularly exceeded that of civilian freight flights, in part because the Air Force moved lower priority items on Logair flights on a space-available basis. Flights were split between trunk routes linking major supply bases, and feeder routes into such bases. Logair loads included hazardous material (for which Logair had an exemption to carry) and items of national security. Aircraft had facilities for couriers or cargo escorts who accompanied certain high-security items. Some items required on-board power to transport items that required environmental control. Aircraft were configured for military 463L master pallets. As the photos show, in the early days, contracted aircraft were titled with "Logair", but this appears to have died out by the late 1960s.

The warehouses at Logair hubs were highly automated. The nearby photo of the C-46 at Kelly Air Force Base in San Antonio shows the Air Force invested in material handling equipment at an early stage. Hill AFB accomplished its first mechanized loading of an Argosy in 1961. Logair routes were established from warehouses to support specific Air Force programs, e.g. one to support F-4s, or another to Minuteman ICBMs.

Logair flights also had their own callsign, "LOGAIR".

== Criticism ==
Critics went after Logair both for relying on commercial services and not relying on commercial service sufficiently. For instance, in 1980, the staff of the House Appropriations Committee said the Air Force could save money by relying on its own C-130 and T-39 aircraft to make deliveries. The response was that in an emergency, such aircraft would be pulled away for front-line military purposes at the exact time that the Air Force would need even more logistics support. On the other hand, in 1958, Slick Airways testified to Congress that by creating its own air freight networks the Air Force and Navy had stunted the development of US scheduled air freight.

== Carriers ==
- AAXICO
- Airlift Intl (Riddle)
- CAM Air International
- Capitol
- Evergreen Intl
- Express One
- Hawaiian
- Interstate
- Kitty Hawk Air Cargo
- Overseas National
- Resort
- Saturn
- Slick
- Southern Air Transport
- Spirit of America
- TIA (Transamerica)
- TPI International
- Universal
- World
- Zantop Air Transport
- Zantop Intl

== Fleet ==
At inception, 1954:

- 12 Curtiss C-46

Fiscal year 1957:

- 33 Curtiss C-46
- 8 Douglas DC-4

1959:

- 50 Curtiss C-46
- 19 Douglas DC-4

FY 1965:

- 22 Douglas DC-6
- 7 Armstrong Whitworth AW.650 Argosy

1 June 1971:

- 3 DC-9-30CF
- 5 Lockheed L-100 Hercules
- 17 Lockheed L-188 Electra

March 1981:

- 4 Lockheed L-100 Hercules (Transamerica)
- 10 Lockheed L-188 Electra (two Evergreen, eight Zantop)

Other aircraft known to fly for Logair include the Boeing 727 and Convair 640.

== Destinations ==
1970 Logair route map

At inception, 1954:

- Brookley Air Force Base, Mobile, Alabama
- Hill Air Force Base, Ogden, Utah
- Kelly Air Force Base, San Antonio, Texas
- McChord Air Force Base, Tacoma, Washington
- McClellan Air Force Base, Sacramento, California
- Mitchell Field, Milwaukee, Wisconsin
- Newark Airport, Newark, New Jersey
- Norton Air Force Base, San Bernardino, California
- O'Hare International Airport, Chicago, Illinois
- Olmsted Air Force Base, Harrisburg, Pennsylvania
- Selfridge Air Force Base, Romulus, Michigan
- Tinker Air Force Base, Oklahoma City, Oklahoma
- Warner-Robins Air Force Base, Warner Robins, Georgia
- Westover Air Force Base, Chicopee, Massachusetts
- Wright-Patterson Air Force Base, Dayton, Ohio

== See also ==
- Quicktrans
- List of defunct airlines of the United States
