= AAXICO Airlines =

US airline 1945–1965 that merged with Saturn

AAXICO Airlines American Air Export and Import Company
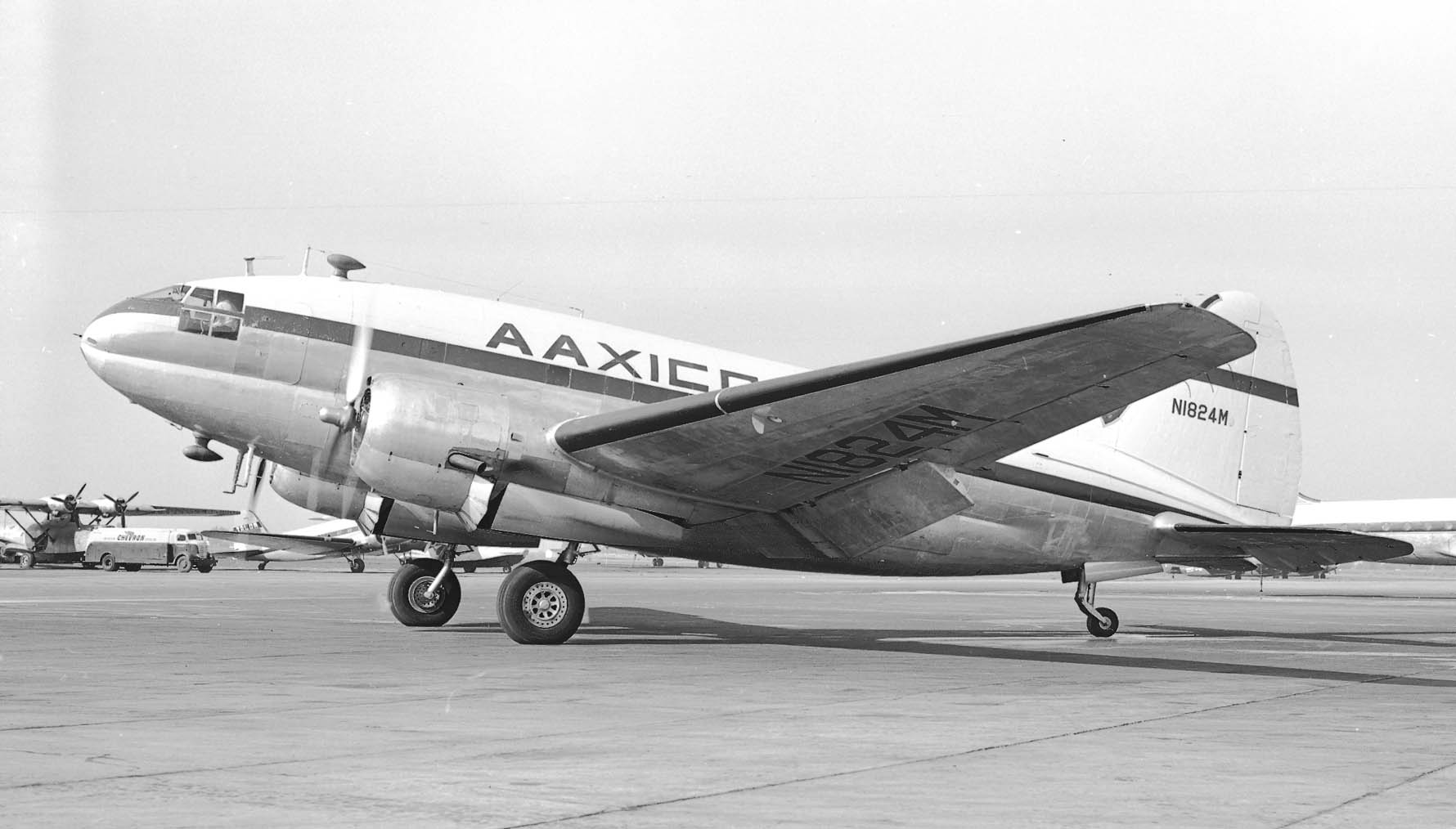
- C-46D at Oakland in February 1954. Note PBY and Transocean DC-3 in the background
IATA	ICAO	Call sign
AX^{(1)}	AX^{(1)}	AAXICO
- Founded: 23 March 1946 incorporated in Florida as American Air Export and Import Company
- Ceased operations: 5 November 1965 merged into Saturn Airways
- Headquarters: Miami, Florida; United States
- Key people: Howard J. Korth

Notes
- (1) IATA, ICAO codes were the same until the 1980s

AAXICO Airlines was an airline based in the United States. AAXICO is an acronym for American Air Export and Import Company. Initially founded as a non-scheduled airline or irregular air carrier, AAXICO was awarded certification as a scheduled air cargo airline in 1955 by the Civil Aeronautics Board (CAB), the now-defunct Federal agency that, at the time, tightly regulated almost all US commercial air transportation. However, in 1962 AAXICO reverted to a supplemental air carrier. In 1965, it was nominally bought by Saturn Airways, another supplemental airline, but AAXICO was the surviving management and ownership. In its later years, AAXICO was noted for its consistent profitability, financial strength and its near total focus on flying for the military, in particular for the Air Force Logair domestic air freight program.

A related company of the same name, owned by the family that controlled AAXICO Airlines, remained in the aircraft parts business until it was sold in 2012.

== History ==
=== Initial passenger service ===
The company was founded in the fall of 1945 as a partnership in Miami, Florida by Charles A. Carroll, who started with $14,000, one airplane, and 14 employees. The company was incorporated in Florida on 23 March 1946. AAXICO initially focused on passenger service, operating as a nominally non-scheduled airline offering service to Miami, New York, Atlantic City, Buffalo, Pittsburgh, Charlotte, Tampa, and Norfolk. It was the first airline to offer direct flights between New York and Havana, Cuba. AAXICO's initial flight service consisted of five daily flights from New York to Atlantic City geared toward the horse racing industry, with the last flight scheduled to wait until after the last race. The airline was clearly offering scheduled service, attracting unwanted attention from the CAB.

=== Shift to freight and a scheduled certificate ===
Thus from October 1946 AAXICO shifted to air freight, flying cargo flights to Central and South America and operating under contract to the US military. In 1953, 98.4% of its operating revenues were from the military, 95.1% for military freight. In November 1955, the CAB awarded AAXICO part of the north-south scheduled freight routes previously operated by defunct U. S. Airlines, with Riddle Airlines getting the balance. At the time of its certification, AAXICO was concentrating on US military contracts and the airline had a fleet of eight C-46 aircraft, three of them owned. AAXICO took almost a year to launch scheduled service on November 15, 1956. In the same month, the company changed its name to AAXICO Airlines, Inc.

=== Re-certification as a supplemental ===
In June 1959, the CAB granted AAXICO's request to suspend scheduled service. AAXICO said it losing too much money flying on a scheduled basis between New York, Atlanta and New Orleans. The CAB noted AAXICO had never used its authority to fly to nine other cities in Ohio, Virginia, Kentucky, Michigan, Illinois, Indianapolis and the District of Columbia, and that it had only served Philadelphia and Birmingham, AL on a flag stop basis. AAXICO continued with charter business, but in June 1962, the CAB made final a case in which it considered scheduled cargo operator certificates for renewal, and in view of AAXICO's suspension of scheduled service, the CAB declined to renew its certificate. This would have shut AAXICO down completely on September 1, but the airline was lucky. Congress had resolved a long-running drama over the legality of nonscheduled carriers (now called supplemental air carriers) by passing a law on July 10 to specifically create a certificate for such airlines. This, among other things, allowed airlines to apply for provisional supplemental certificates based on certain criteria, and AAXICO qualified. It duly received an interim supplemental certificate on October 5, 1962, returning the airline to non-scheduled status, and in the CAB extended AAXICO's old scheduled certificate to cover the gap between September 1 and October 5.

=== Reliance on US Air Force ===
AAXICO operating revenue, operating profit and revenue-ton miles
(000)\Year ending June	1959	1960	1961	1962
Operating revenue ($)	7,040	11,042	850	9,092
Operating profit ($)	714	1,856	(192)	204
Charter revenue ton-miles^{(1)}	34,134	71,598	-	57,413
Scheduled revenue ton-miles	4,278	-	-	-
(1) A RTM is one ton carried one mile for pay.

AAXICO's fortunes depended on its ability to secure a share of the annual Air Force Logair contract (the Air Force's domestic air freight network), which covered the period July through June of the following year. In 1959 AAXICO secured a substantial increase in its share of the Logair contract resulting in a doubling in charter revenue-ton miles (see table) making it by far the largest Logair contractor. The start of this period coincided with the beginning of its suspension of the scheduled freight operation. The company saw a more than doubling of its operating profit from YEJune 1959 to YE June 1960 with the combination of the bigger Logair operation and elimination of the money-losing scheduled operation. But AAXICO was then shut out entirely from the Logair contract for the next year, so it simply did not operate at all from July 1960 to June 1961, leasing 25 C-46 aircraft to one of the winning Logair bidders for that period. AAXICO laid off everyone except seven employees, including 221 pilots. In 1961, however, AAXICO won new Logair contracts, including for DC-6 service, so started back up in operation on July 1, 1961.

=== Consistent profitability ===
In an evaluation of the airline in late 1964, the CAB said AAXICO had maintained a "solid financial status by all yardsticks of evaluation." Since 1957, other than the year it did not operate, the CAB noted AAXICO made consistent profits, had "strong cash and working capital position" with "little to no long-term debt." The CAB also noted AAXICO's activities in the purchase, sale and lease of aircraft. The only reservation the CAB had was AAXICO's near total dependence on the military.

=== Labor issues ===
The year-long shut down had long-term labor repercussions. AAXICO pilots were represented by the Air Line Pilots Association (ALPA). The airline took the position that, because it had shut down for a year, its ALPA contract no longer had effect. ALPA was informed of this during the shut down, but failed to grieve the issue at that time. So, when AAXICO returned to operation in 1961, it hired new pilots. ALPA pursued AAXICO in court, which turned out to be a mistake, because a Federal appeals court noted that the appropriate forum was the National Mediation Board (NMB), which oversees labor relations in the airline industry. The court also noted that ALPA could have saved everyone a lot of trouble by grieving the issue as soon as they were aware of it. The issue was remanded to the NMB. In the meantime, AAXICO and Saturn Airways agreed to merge (see below), and ALPA tried to get the CAB to prevent the merger until AAXICO lived up to what ALPA saw as its obligations. The CAB said the same thing: the NMB will decide this issue. However, the CAB did direct the new merged airline to wait on integrating the pilot corps until the NMB process ended. And in fact the NMB process did rule against AAXICO and the matter was settled in favor of ALPA.

=== Merger with Saturn ===
On 13 November 1964, AAXICO and Saturn Airways announced Saturn was buying AAXICO. The sale was nominal as Saturn's owner was left with only 5% stake in the combined company and Howard J. Korth, who owned 96.5% of AAXICO, lead the combined company. The difference in financial strength was stark: it was determined that the fair market value of Saturn was $620,000, whereas that of AAXICO was $10.5mm. But each company brought something to the table:

- New US Department of Defense regulations requiring its contracted airlines make at least 30% of revenue from commercial sources, and AAXICO was a Logair specialist. AAXICO needed Saturn's non-military business.
- Saturn had authority to fly transatlantic charters, but it did not have the financial resources to acquire jets to leverage that authority. AAXICO provided that.

Since Saturn had the transatlantic authority, and acquisition of Saturn would require re-applying for that authority, Saturn had to be the surviving entity, though AAXICO was the surviving management and ownership. The merger closed November 5, 1965. On 7 February 1966, Howard J. Korth, now president of the new Saturn, announced its first orders for jets, two DC-8-61s.

=== AAXICO Sales ===
Not included in the Saturn merger was AAXICO Sales, Inc., a parts distribution company. This was retained by the Korth family and its existence became an issue with the CAB, because it had a legislative mandate to ensure any interlocking arrangement between airlines and any other phase of aviation was in the public interest. Howard Korth sold off his stake to other family members, but Saturn was still restricted from doing more than $100,000 in yearly business with AAXICO Sales without CAB approval. AAXICO Sales, eventually just AAXICO, continued in business in the parts manufacturing and distribution business, still owned by the Korth family, until it was sold in 2012 to Kapco-Global, now known as Proponent, an aircraft parts supplier.

== Fleet ==
August 1959:

- 2 Douglas DC-6A (on lease to other airlines)
- 40 Curtiss C-46

At the time the CAB reviewed the merger, AAXICO had the following fleet:

- 3 Curtiss C-46
- 9 Douglas DC-6A
- 2 Douglas DC-7CF

In addition, it also owned another 11 C-46s on lease to Zantop Air Transport.

== Legacy ==
Other than the surviving aircraft parts company, AAXICO's legacy was found in post-merger Saturn Airways. Saturn took on many of the AAXICO attributes, perhaps most notably its financial success. When Howard Korth sold Saturn to Trans International Airlines, Saturn was not operating its passenger aircraft due to the weak passenger market, similar to how AAXICO stopped operating the year it had no military contract.

== Incidents and accidents ==
- 2 September 1959: A Curtiss C-46F Commando flying AAXICO Logair Trip 7002 between Dyess Air Force Base and Carswell Air Force Base experienced a mechanical issue with the elevators in flight and attempted to return to Dyess Air Force Base. While attempting to land, the aircraft crashed, killing the two crew members aboard. The CAB blamed inadequate inspection for the failure.
- 14 August 1963: A Curtiss C-46F flying a Logair cargo flight near Great Falls, Montana experienced an engine failure leading to attempted landing in a plowed field. The aircraft struck an embankment and was destroyed, killing the first officer. The CAB said the pilot failed to properly assess the engine malfunction, then failed to properly manage a single-engine landing.
- 25 September 1963: A Curtiss C-46F operating flight LOGAIR 14/25 experienced an engine fire and overshot the runway at McCarran Field in Las Vegas, Nevada while attempting to perform an emergency landing. Both crew members were uninjured, but the aircraft experienced substantial structural damage.
- 23 April 1965: A Douglas DC-6A crashed into the west slope of Mount Rainier, Washington, destroying the aircraft and killing the five crewmembers aboard. The probably cause was becoming disoriented while "continuing the flight on a VFR flight plan in instrument weather conditions."
- 18 May 1965: A Douglas DC-6A crashed during an approach to a landing at Whiteman Air Force Base in Knob Noster, Missouri, destroying the aircraft. The three crew members aboard escaped uninjured. The probable cause was "an improperly executed landing approach into an area of adverse weather."

== See also ==
- Saturn Airways
- Logair
- Supplemental air carrier
- List of defunct airlines of the United States
