= Universal Airlines (United States) =

US charter airline, 1966–1972

IATA	ICAO	Call sign
UV^{(1)}	UV^{(1)}	Universal
- Commenced operations: 29 December 1966 name change from Zantop Air Transport
- Ceased operations: 4 May 1972
- Operating bases: Willow Run Airport; Oakland International Airport
- Fleet size: see Fleet below
- Key people: Lamar Muse; Glenn L. Hickerson

Notes
- (1) IATA, ICAO codes were the same until the 1980s

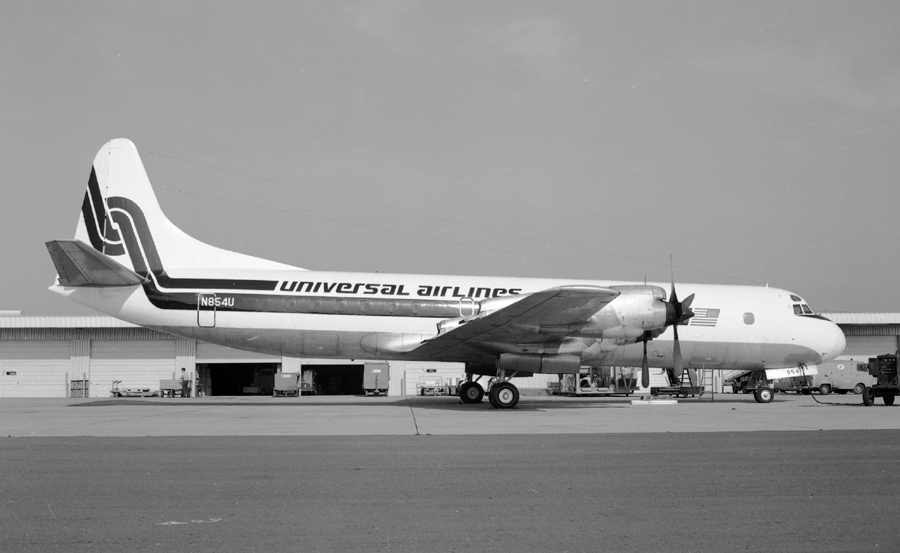
Lockheed L-188CF Electra at Oakland February 1971

Universal Airlines was a United States supplemental air carrier that operated from 1966 to 1972, based initially at Willow Run Airport in Ypsilanti, Michigan and later at Oakland International Airport in California. Universal was a re-naming of Zantop Air Transport. At the time, supplemental air carrier was the Civil Aeronautics Board (CAB) term for charter airline, the CAB being the Federal agency that tightly regulated US carriers in that era. Universal was one of the largest such carriers, but only briefly profitable and did not survive 1972 bankruptcy.

From September 1957 to September 1959, an unrelated supplemental air carrier called S.S.W. operated under the dba of Universal Airlines.

A Houston-based commuter air carrier used the Universal Airways name in the late 1970s.

Another unconnected Universal Airlines based at Detroit City Airport operated air freight during the 1980s and 1990s with DC-6s.

== History ==
In 1946, the Zantop brothers started Zantop Flying Service, a fixed base operator. This evolved into Zantop Air Transport in 1956, which flew auto parts for the car manufacturers and flew air freight for the US Air Force. In 1962, Zantop Air Transport became a supplemental air carrier.

=== Purchase ===
In October 1966, Universal Consolidated Industries (the Matthews family) bought Zantop Air Transport, initially through a corporate entity called Intercontinental Airlines. Despite the fact that the Matthews family moved quickly on to the Universal Airlines name, this caused some confusion. The Federal Aviation Administration, in its year-end 1966 tally of supplemental air carrier fleets, included Universal under the name Intercontinental.

The transaction was arranged by Frank Lorenzo and Robert Carney, later of Texas Air fame, who sourced and matched the seller and buyer. A name change was filed with the State of Michigan effective 29 December 1966 for Universal Airlines, Inc.

=== Turbine transition ===
The fleet originally comprised C-46, DC-6, DC-7, and Armstrong Whitworth AW.650 Argosy aircraft to which Lockheed Electras were added. Universal had three businesses: flying parts for auto manufacturers, flying freight for the military and passenger charters.

Lamar Muse was president and part owner of Universal from 1967 to 1969. He went on to become the first president and CEO of Southwest Airlines (1971–1978) and later co-founded his namesake airline Muse Air where he served as chairman and CEO. Muse resigned from Universal after the owner insisted on ordering 747s. During his tenure, Universal became a public company with an initial public offering in November 1968.

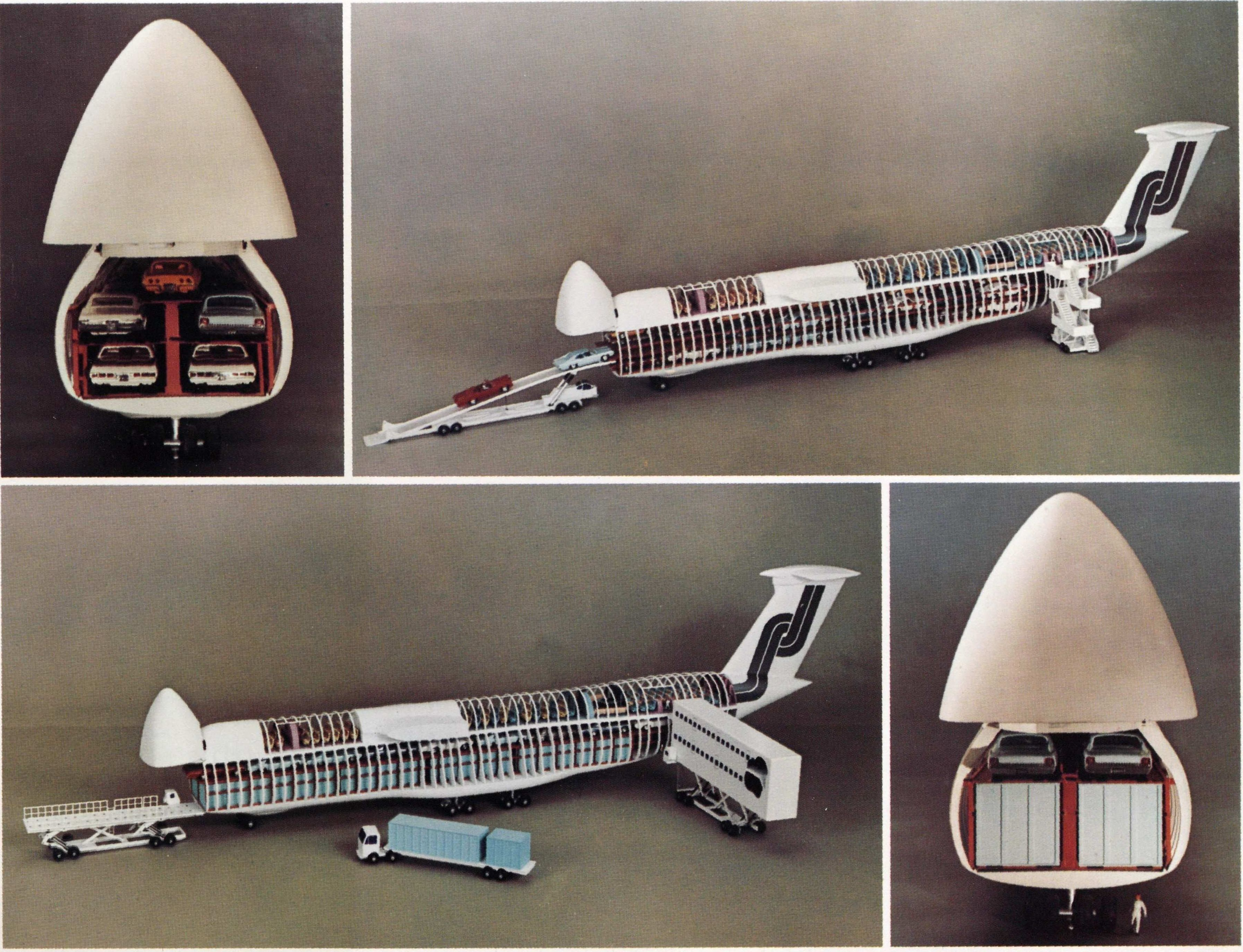
Lockheed L-500 model featured in Universal's 1968 annual report

In 1969 Universal took delivery of DC-8 aircraft both standard and stretched versions, and leased three additional DC-8s over the next three years. It operated a number of military contract flights. During its heyday in 1969, Universal Airlines looked into the plausibility of obtaining the Lockheed L-500 (civilian C-5) to carry passengers and their vehicles from coast to coast. A cutaway L-500 model of the concept featured in Universal's 1968 annual report. (see External links for a link).

Universal Airlines Financial Results, 1967 thru 1971^{(1)}(1) As filed with the CAB(2) Among supplemental air carriers, by revenue
USD 000	1967	1968	1969	1970	1971
Operating revenue:					
Military charter	23,107	20,440	27,297	24,268	24,682
Civilian charter	11,757	18,324	18,408	22,735	31,168
Other	1,884	4,360	429	429	132
Total	36,748	32,836	46,134	47,432	55,982
Op profit (loss)	155	5,182	(2,293)	1,189	(4,525)
Net profit (loss)	(545)	2,113	(1,671)	81	(4,582)
Op margin (%)	0.4	15.8	-5.0	2.5	-8.1
Industry rank^{(2)}	2	3	4	4	3

=== Bankruptcy ===
In 1970, Universal announced it was moving to Oakland, at that time a center of the US charter business, home to World Airways, Trans International Airlines and Saturn Airways. In May 1971, Universal purchased American Flyers Airline. But on 4 May 1972, Universal ceased operations and went bankrupt. Trans International took over its passenger contracts while Saturn took over some of the cargo contracts, including absorbing nine Universal Electras in its fleet.

Universal's president, Glenn L. Hickerson, in 1976 Senate testimony, outlined the causes of Universal's demise as he saw them:

- Contraction of automaker parts business. Revenue from this source collapsed from about $20mm in 1968, $12.5mm in 1969, $5mm in 1971 and only $600K in the first quarter of 1972.
- Military market was not an alternative as it was not growing during this period, and indeed saw additional competition.

Universal attempted to restructure, cutting employment from 1400 in 1968 to 750 in 1971. It acquired American Flyers to obtain its transatlantic charter authority, viewed as one of the few bright spots in the charter market. Unfortunately, the CAB took a long time to approve the merger, meaning the 1971 summer charter season performed less well than expected. Further, the CAB then tentatively decided to pull Universal's transatlantic authority for 1972, which made financing Universal almost impossible. The airline collapsed one day before the CAB announced that it would, in fact, permit Universal to continue to operate charters across the Atlantic.

=== Consequences to the Matthews family ===
Both Muse and Lorenzo, in their respective memoirs, noted the serious consequences to the Matthews family, which gave its personal guarantees to Universal aircraft financings, and thus lost the family fortune when Universal went bankrupt. Lorenzo said it was a lesson he never forgot. Muse, who co-signed with Matthews but escaped on a technicality, said it was the dumbest move of his life.

== Subsequent events ==
On 30 May 1972, the Zantop brothers incorporated Zantop International Airlines (ZIA) and by June they were in operation, once again flying auto parts. They once again started flying for the Air Force and in 1977 once again obtained certification as a supplemental air carrier from the CAB. At the same time, Ronald Deane Melvin established International Airlines Academy as a spinoff from the Universal pilot training group. Melvin was a small founding investor in ZIA and the Zantops were small founding investors in the academy. In 1975, the academy founded its own freight airline, Trans Continental Airlines, which lasted into the 2000s as Express.Net Airlines.

== Fleet ==
December 1966:

- 6 Armstrong Whitworth AW.650 Argosy
- 15 Douglas DC-7
- 7 Douglas DC-6
- 32 Curtiss C-46
- 1 Douglas DC-3

December 1967:

- 5 Armstrong Whitworth AW.650 Argosy
- 19 Douglas DC-7
- 4 Douglas DC-6
- 32 Curtiss C-46

August 1971:

- 4 Armstrong Whitworth AW.650 Argosy
- 5 Douglas DC-8-61CF
- 12 Lockheed L-188CF Electra

== Accidents ==
- 2 July 1968: DC-7BF N762Z landing at Philadelphia on a US Navy contract flight from Norfolk, Virginia hydroplaned off a wet runway due to improper power management. The landing gear collapsed and the right wing tore off, but fire was suppressed by firefighters and the crew was unhurt.
- 27 September 1968: DC-7CF N7466 was on ground-controlled approach to Marine Corps Air Station Cherry Point on a flight from Charleston Naval Air Station in the early morning in bad weather when it crashed south of the runway. The investigation cited the crew not following procedures and directives. The crew was treated and released from hospital but the aircraft was a writeoff.
- 24 August 1970: Lockheed L-188C Electra N855U departed Hill Air Force Base in Ogden, Utah on an Air Force Logair flight to Mountain Home Air Force Base in Idaho. The aircraft departed without all its hydraulic systems in operation, leaving insufficient elevator authority, resulting in the aircraft nosing over into the ground. The aircraft was destroyed but the crew escaped with injuries. The investigation found fault with the captain and flight engineer for not following approved procedures and directives.
- 19 March 1972: Lockheed L-188C Electra N851U was on a ferry flight from Tucson, Arizona to Hill Air Force Base in Ogden, Utah when it developed an engine overspeed issue, complicated by an inability to feather. The aircraft landed at Hill just after midnight, whereupon the engine exploded, destroying a large portion of the left wing and causing a substantial fire. The crew had minor injuries but the aircraft was a writeoff. The crew was cited in the investigation for improper procedures.

== See also ==
- Zantop Air Transport
- American Flyers Airline
- Zantop International Airlines
- Supplemental air carrier
- Frank Lorenzo
- Lamar Muse
- List of defunct airlines of the United States
