= Gillespie Airport (Tennessee) =

Coordinates: 36°11′31″N 86°48′12″W

Gillespie Airport is a former airport in Nashville, Tennessee.It was opened in 1941. During World War II, it was leased to the United States Army Air Forces as a training airfield.

Known USAAF units which trained at Gillespie Army Air Field were:

- 305th Bombardment Squadron (Dive), 3 Oct 1942–2 Nov 1942
- 306th Bombardment Squadron (Dive), 3 Oct 1942–2 Nov 1942
- 307th Bombardment Squadron (Dive), 3 Oct 1942–2 Nov 1942
- 308th Bombardment Squadron (Dive), 3 Oct 1942–2 Nov 1942

Returned after the war to private ownership, it was later bought by the city of Nashville and was renamed "Cumberland Field". It was closed in the late 1950s, and the land was redeveloped. Today the location of the former airfield is now part of the Nashville Metro Center.

== See also ==
- Tennessee World War II Army Airfields
