= Zantop Air Transport =

US cargo airline (1956–1966), became Universal Airlines

- Founded: 6 July 1956 (incorporated in Michigan)
- Ceased operations: 29 December 1966 (renamed to Universal Airlines)
- Operating bases: Detroit, Michigan; Ontario, California
- Fleet size: See Fleet
- Headquarters: Inkster, Michigan; United States
- Founders: Lloyd Zantop; Howard Zantop; Duane Zantop

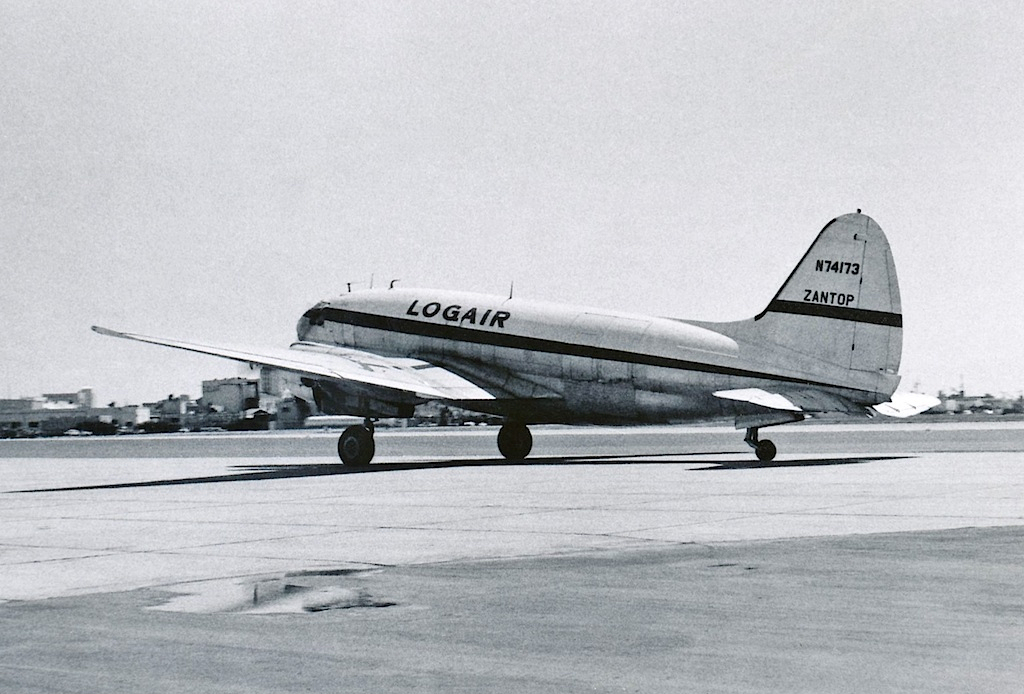
Logair C-46 March 1962

Zantop Air Transport was a United States airline incorporated in 7 July 1956 from the earlier Zantop Flying Service. This was the first of at least four airlines (the others being Zantop International Airlines, Zantop Airways and Air Transport International) founded by the Zantop brothers. It was a Part 45 carrier until 1962 when the Civil Aeronautics Board approved transfer of the operating certificate of Coastal Air Lines, making Zantop a supplemental air carrier. As a Part 45 carrier, Zantop was not a common carrier, it flew contract work for the Big Three automakers and for the Air Force Logair air freight service and with the US Navy Quicktrans freight service up and down the Eastern Seaboard. As a supplemental, Zantop was able to hold itself out to the public as a general charter carrier. The original founders of Zantop Flying Services, the Zantop brothers, all sold their stock and resigned from the company in 1966. A name change was filed with the State of Michigan effective 29 December 1966 in the name of Universal Airlines, Inc. The transaction was arranged by Frank Lorenzo and Robert Carney, later of Texas Air fame, who sourced the seller and buyers.

The airline was based at Wayne County Airport, Inkster, Michigan. Zantop also had, at one time, an Ontario, California operating base.

== Zantop Flying Service ==
Zantop Flying Service was a fixed base operator (FBO) formed by brothers Duane, Lloyd and Howard Zantop as a partnership in 1946. The base of operations for the new company was Jackson, Michigan. At first, the fledgling company used light aircraft, and performed cargo duties for General Motors. In 1952 the company obtained a commercial operators permit and began to service Chrysler and Ford. A year later in 1953 they moved the operations to Wayne Major Airport, now Detroit Metro Airport.

The company continued under that name until becoming Zantop Air Transport in 1956.

== Zantop International Airlines ==
Universal collapsed on 4 May 1972. Zantop International Airlines was incorporated 30 May 1972 by the three Zantop brothers with minority participation by two other people. By June it was in operation, once again flying auto parts.

== Fleet ==
As of September 30, 1959:

- 13 Curtiss C-46
- 1 Douglas DC-3

As of 30 June 1961:

- 14 Curtiss C-46
- 5 Douglas DC-4
- 1 Douglas DC-3

As of 31 December 1965:

- 6 Armstrong Whitworth Argosy
- 42 Curtiss C-46
- 1 Douglas DC-3
- 8 Douglas DC-6
- 8 Douglas DC-7

See External links for a link to a photo of a Zantop Argosy.

In 1960, Zantop won a USAF Logair domestic cargo contract for bulky freight by agreeing to purchase five Lockheed C-130B transports that were to be commercially certificated by Lockheed. The agreement foundered when Zantop and Lockheed were unable to agree on financing terms.

== Incidents and accidents ==
- 20 January 1954: Zantop Flying Service DC-3 N49551 headed to Fairfax Municipal Airport in Kansas City from Jackson, Michigan crashed near Kansas City Municipal Airport (close to Fairfax). Probable cause was loss of control due to an accumulation of ice and the use of de-ice boots, which increases stall speed. The three on board, all crew, perished.
- 16 December 1956: Curtiss C-46A N2028A encountered thick fog as it made a VFR approach to Long Beach, California from El Paso, landing short. All four on board survived, but the aircraft was a writeoff.
- 14 November 1961: Douglas DC-4 N30061—destruction of the aircraft but no fatalities.
- 16 February 1963: Curtiss C-46F N616Z, Logair flight 60-16, crashed in a pasture in Puyallup, Washington after a one-engine go-around following an attempted emergency landing at a small airport. The crew, the only ones on board, survived, severely injured. The pilot was cited for mismanaging the malfunctioning engine, but a contributing factor was air traffic control's failure to notify the crew of the limitations of the small airport, leading them to attempt an emergency landing there rather than at a more suitable airport.
- 7 December 1963: Curtiss C-46A N609Z on a Logair flight disappeared enroute from Lowry Air Force Base in Denver to Hill Air Force Base in Ogden, Utah on an Air Force Logair flight. The wreckage was not found until July 1964. The aircraft had flown into a mountain at 12,500 ft elevation. The accident report cited improper planning and poor judgement on behalf of the crew.
- 20 November 1964: Curtiss C-46A N3971B crashed on takeoff from Detroit Metropolitan Airport on a flight bound for Wilmington, Delaware due to inadequate de-icing. The aircraft was destroyed but the crew suffered only minor injuries.
- 30 December 1964: Curtiss C-46A N608Z suffered loss of control during a night IFR approach to Detroit Metropolitan Airport on a flight from Cleveland Airport for an undetermined reason. The accident report noted it was consistent with sudden incapacitation by the highly experienced captain with an attempted recovery by the first officer, but post-mortem of the captain did not find evidence of a heart-attack or similar. The aircraft was destroyed and four crew died.
- 13 September 1965: Curtiss C-46D N5132B had taken off from Dover Air Force Base in Delaware on a flight to Philadelphia when it suffered the loss of an engine. The crew attempted to return to Dover but was forced down in a corn field. The crew of two, and a Navy civilian employee passenger walked away, but the aircraft was a writeoff.
- 14 October 1965: Armstrong Whitworth AW.650 Argosy N601Z was on a Logair flight from Truax Air Force Base in Madison, Wisconsin to Wright-Patterson Air Force Base when it ran out of fuel and made an emergency landing on Interstate 75 near Piqua, Ohio, north of Dayton. The aircraft struck an overpass and was damaged beyond repair, but the crew of three was unharmed and no motorists were injured. The pilots were cited for improper fuel planning and management. See External links for a photo of the aircraft that crashed.
- 16 June 1966: Curtiss C-46A N10415 collided with a Piper Aztec near Columbia City, Indiana while on a flight from Detroit to Kansas City. The two pilot crew of the C-46 died, as did the single pilot in the Aztec. The investigation said neither aircraft had kept a sufficient lookout for traffic.
- 28 July 1966: Curtiss C-46A N9905F was substantially overweight for its flight to Chicago with autoparts when it lost an engine after takeoff from Newark, New Jersey. The captain elected to land in mudflats in Newark Bay, avoiding nearby populated areas. While injured, the crew survived. The aircraft was a writeoff.

== See also ==
- Universal Airlines (United States)
- Zantop International Airlines
- Zantop Airways
- Air Transport International
- Part 45 carrier
- Logair
- Quicktrans
- Supplemental air carrier
- List of defunct airlines of the United States
