= Saturn Airways =

US charter airline 1948–1976 bought by Trans International

Saturn Airways All-American Airways
| IATA | ICAO | Call sign |
|---|---|---|
| KS | KS | SATURN |
- Founded: 1 January 1948 (incorporated in Florida as All American Airways)
- Ceased operations: 30 November 1976 (merged into Trans International Airlines)
- Operating bases: Oakland, California
- Fleet size: see Fleet
- Headquarters: Oakland, California; Miami, Florida
- Key people: Howard J. Korth

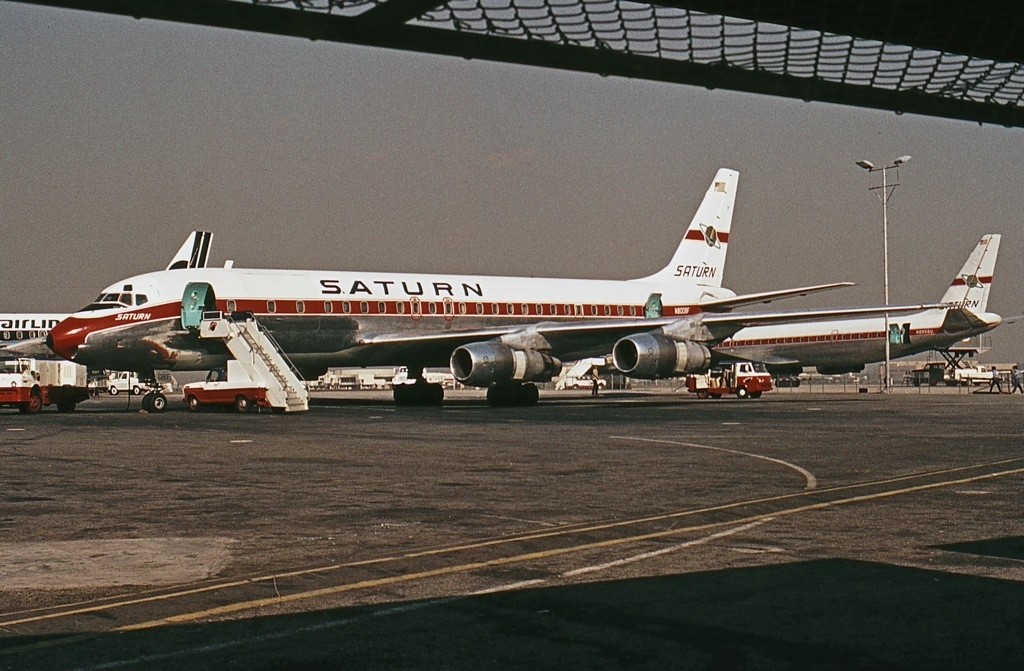
DC-8-54F at Los Angeles 1970

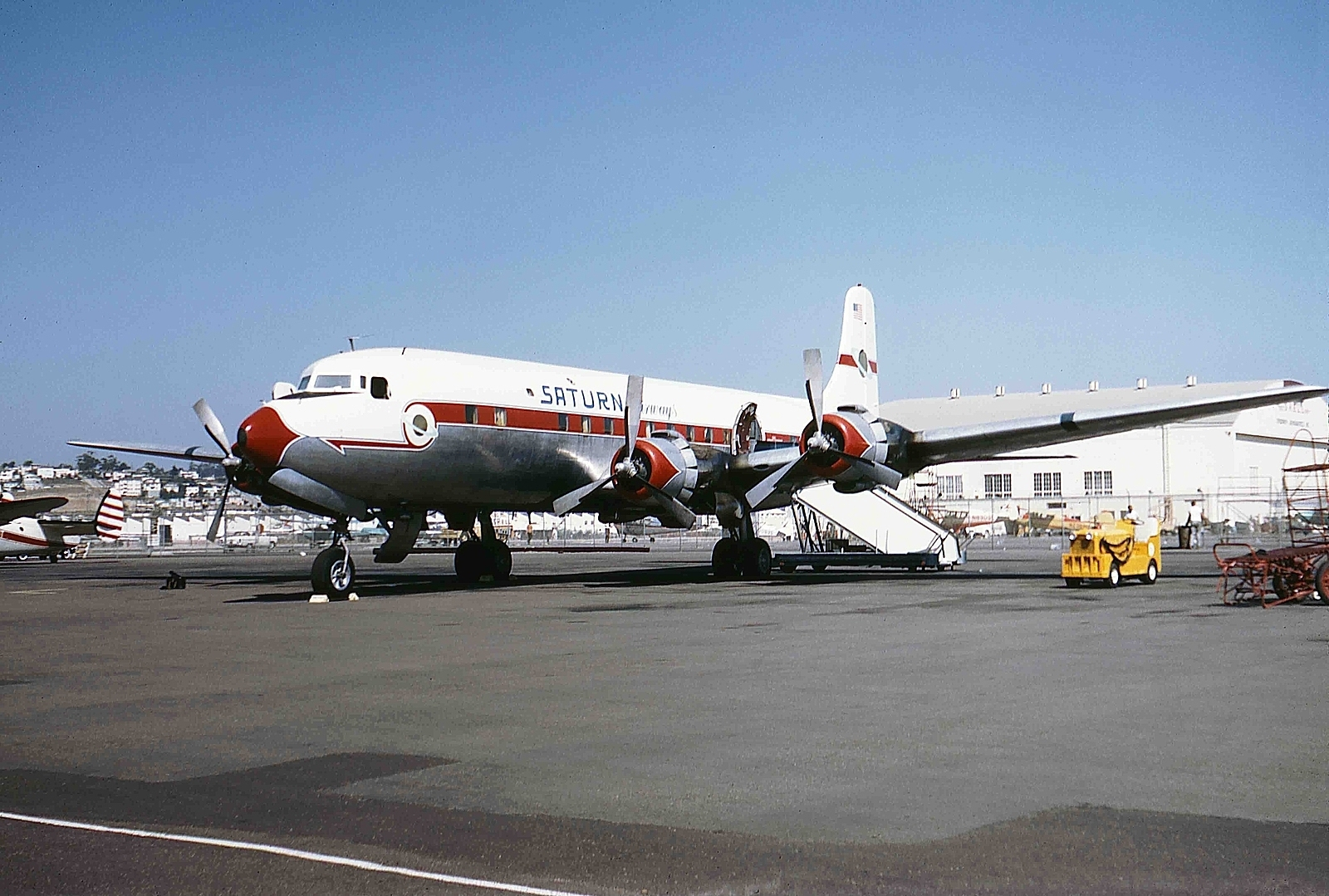
DC-6B San Diego 1963

DC-7C Venice 1966

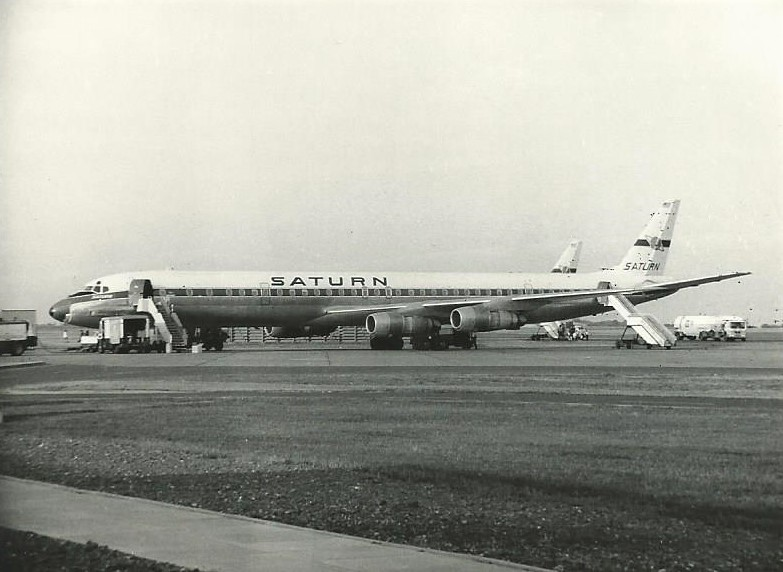
DC-8-61CF London Stansted 1970. Note the second Saturn DC-8 behind the first

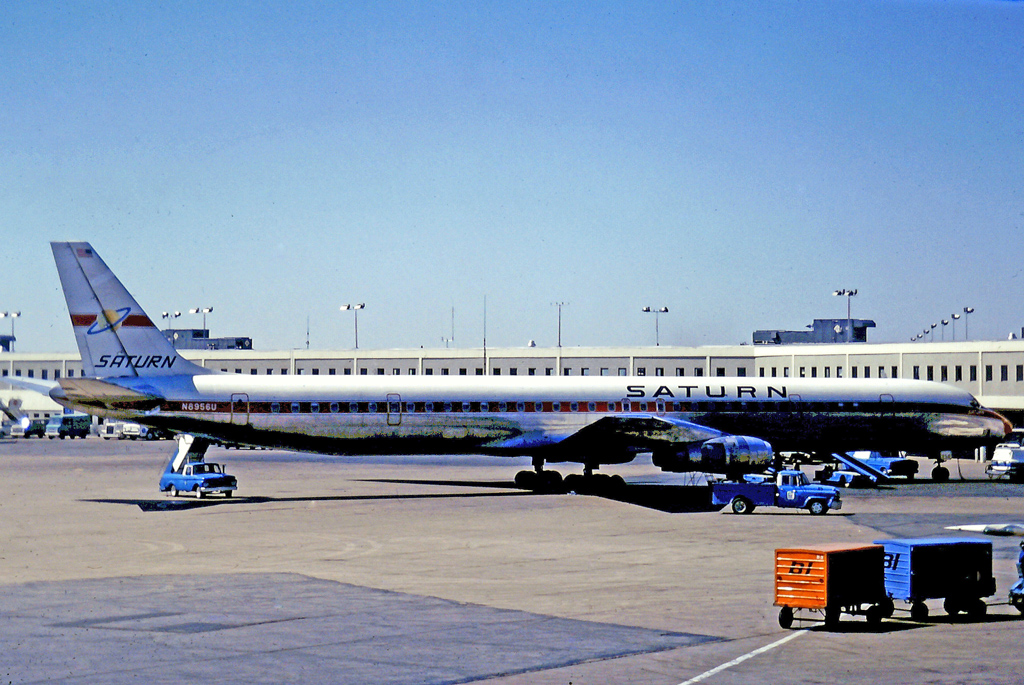
DC-8-61CF Chicago 1971

Saturn Airways was a US supplemental air carrier (meaning, from 1964, a charter carrier) overseen by the Civil Aeronautics Board (CAB), the now-defunct Federal agency that, at the time, tightly regulated almost all US commercial air transport. From 1965, Saturn was majority owned by Howard Korth, who previously controlled AAXICO Airlines, which merged into Saturn that year. Originally a Florida company, Saturn moved to Oakland, California in 1967, headquartered at Oakland International Airport. Saturn flew Douglas DC-8 passenger charters to Europe from the late 1960s, but by the time it merged into Trans International Airlines (TIA) in 1976, Saturn was purely a cargo airline with a significant military business, including flying Lockheed L-100 Hercules aircraft.

== History ==
=== Early days ===
The company was initially an irregular air carrier known as All-American Airways based in Miami, unrelated to the local service carrier All-American Airways that became Allegheny Airlines and US Airways. The company was incorporated in Florida on January 1, 1948. In 1953, the airline had two C-46 aircraft and breakeven financial results on $425,714 of revenue, 99% of which was passenger revenue, 87% military revenue. In 1960 it changed its name to Saturn Airways and began operating Douglas DC-6s. Saturn bought larger DC-7Cs in 1963 from BOAC and operated them on transatlantic passenger charter flights.

On 5 November 1965 Saturn merged with AAXICO Airlines, in what was effectively an acquisition by AAXICO. Saturn's former owner received only a 5% stake in the new company. AAXICO wanted Saturn for two reasons: (1) AAXICO specialized in flying for Logair, the Air Force's domestic cargo network. AAXICO was so reliant on Logair that when, in Fiscal Year 1961, it failed to win a share of the annual Logair contract, it did not operate at all for 12 months. But the military wanted contractors to have civil revenue, so AAXICO needed a civil business. (2) Saturn had the right to fly charters to Europe, but not the financial strength to buy jets. AAXICO had that strength.

=== Korth-owned Saturn ===
Howard Korth had owned 96.5% of AAXICO. At the time Saturn was sold to Trans International Airlines in 1976, he owned 84% of Saturn. In February 1966, Saturn ordered two DC-8-61CFs. Saturn went public in May 1967 and in October moved from Miami to Oakland. The jets delivered in December 1967 and January 1968. In the late 1960s Saturn relied on the jets as it initially failed to negotiate the transition of Logair to turbine equipment. Korth testified in Congress against Logair abandoning piston aircraft, noting short flight lengths meant turbines provided little advantage and DC-6s were inexpensive and reliable. But Congress wanted turbines and by year-end 1969, Saturn was out of Logair, also the only year Korth-owned Saturn had an operating loss (see table). But also at year end 1969, Saturn ordered Lockheed L-100 Hercules (for delivery in mid-1970) for a contract to fly Rolls-Royce RB211 engines from the UK to Lockheed's factory (at Palmdale) for the L-1011 widebody airliner program. Saturn got special CAB permission to do so. The Hercules allowed Saturn to return to Logair in July 1970.

Saturn absorbed business from weak or failed carriers. In October 1970, Saturn took over the Logair business of Airlift International and three Hercules that came with it (one crashed almost immediately, the day after the transaction closed, flown by an Airlift crew, see Accidents). Financially-shaky Airlift hoped the proceeds would allow it to finance DC-8 deliveries in jeopardy. In May 1972, Universal Airlines, also based at Oakland airport, collapsed. Saturn added nine former Universal Lockheed L-188 Electra aircraft to its fleet and the Logair contract they were flying. See External links for a photo of an Electra in a transitional Universal/Saturn livery.

In 1968 Korth said he expected passenger charters to be the future of Saturn. But growth in the transAtlantic market slowed in 1973 even in advance of the oil crisis later that year, which resulted in substantial increased costs. In November 1974, Saturn exited the passenger business, making it a cargo airline. As the table shows, operating margins increased in 1975 over 1974. Saturn became dominant within Logair and the Navy equivalent, Quicktrans. In Federal fiscal year (then ending June) 1975 Saturn took 77% and in FY1976 took 86% of the total contract money of the combined Logair/Quicktrans programs, the key to which was that Saturn was the only CAB-certificated carrier that flew Hercules. As the CAB noted in 1977, Saturn (or, by then Trans International) was a monopoly supplier. Saturn's FY1976 Logair/Quicktrans awards were $37 million. As the table shows, that was substantial relative to calendar 1975 and 1976 revenues. Further, the civilian market for oversize cargo was also strong in the mid-1970s, driven by, among other things, construction of the Alaska pipeline.

Saturn specialized in unusual cargo, including the Triple Crown-winning racehorse Secretariat, a limousine for Archbishop Makarios of Cyprus, and satellite communication equipment for the 1972 visit by Richard Nixon to China, the first time a US commercial air freight flight landed in mainland China in over 20 years.

Saturn Airways Financial Results, 1966 thru 1976^{(1)}(1) Airline only, as filed with the CAB(2) 11 months ending November(3) Among supplemental air carriers, by revenue
| USD 000 | 1966 | 1967 | 1968 | 1969 | 1970 | 1971 | 1972 | 1973 | 1974 | 1975 | 1976^{(2)} |
|---|---|---|---|---|---|---|---|---|---|---|---|
| Operating revenue: | | | | | | | | | | | |
| Military charter | 22,366 | 19,932 | 22,884 | 14,788 | 13,074 | 17,347 | | 24,603 | 34,176 | 38,013 | 39,232 |
| Civilian charter | 4,256 | 2,057 | 9,925 | 12,261 | 10,712 | 13,695 | 25,392 | 35,861 | 33,854 | 21,772 | 20,094 |
| Other | 0 | 32 | 28 | 87 | (458) | (987) | | (207) | 3,094 | 1,927 | 532 |
| Total | 26,622 | 22,022 | 32,836 | 27,136 | 23,328 | 30,055 | 47,511 | 60,259 | 71,914 | 61,712 | 59,857 |
| Op profit (loss) | 4,401 | 1,704 | 5,030 | (386) | 957 | 1,679 | 4,413 | 5,925 | 6,557 | 9,160 | 11,066 |
| Net profit (loss) | 2,100 | 2,287 | 3,734 | 162 | 557 | 534 | | 2,541 | 4,913 | 5,311 | 6,206 |
| Op margin (%) | 16.5 | 7.7 | 15.3 | -1.4 | 4.1 | 5.6 | 9.3 | 9.8 | 9.1 | 14.8 | 18.5 |
| Industry rank^{(3)} | 5 | 5 | 5 | 6 | 6 | 6 | 4 | 4 | 4 | 4 | 4 |

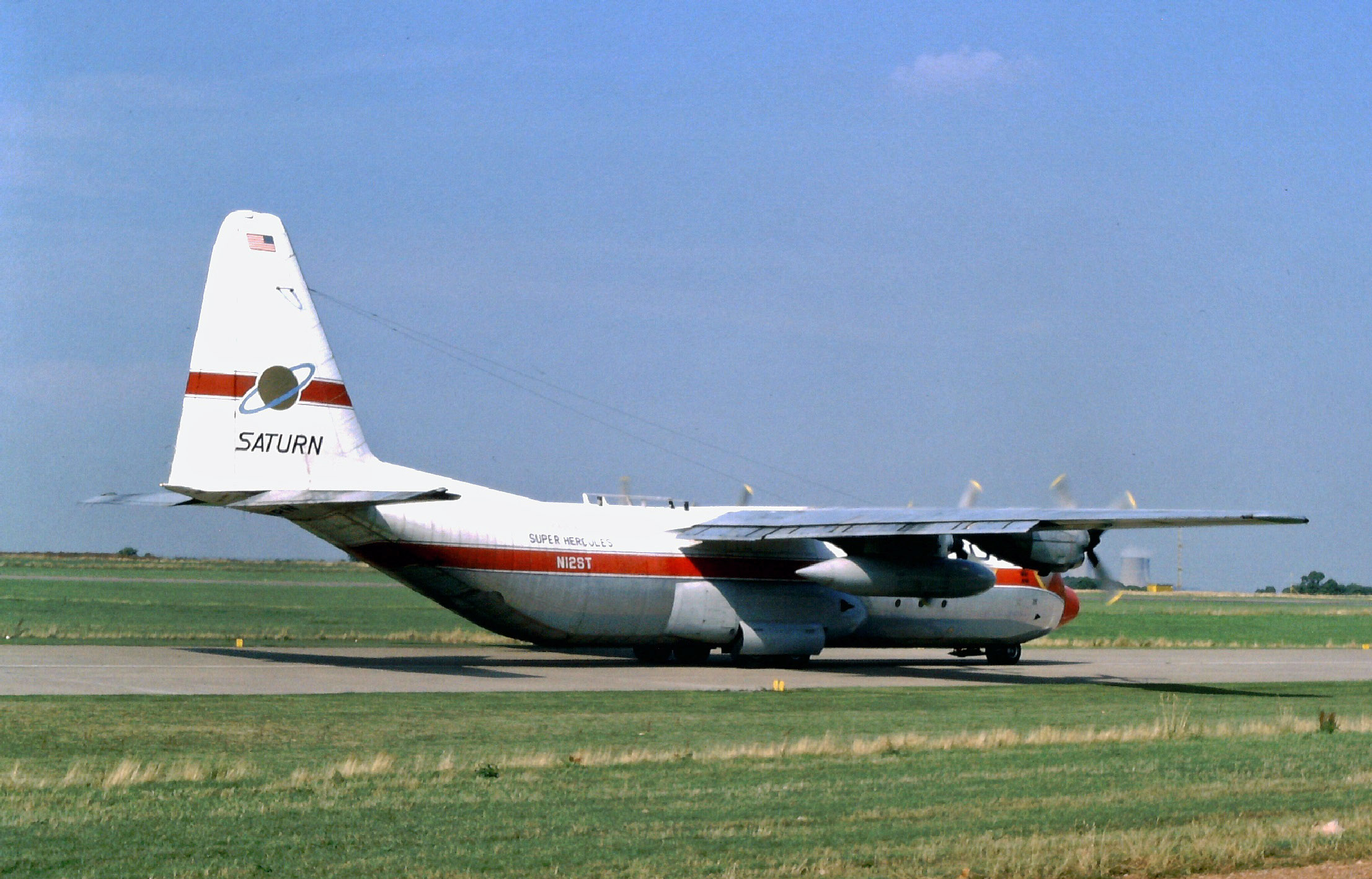
L-100 Hercules East Midlands 1975

=== Trans International Airlines merger ===
Saturn merged into Trans International Airlines (TIA) on November 30, 1976. A significant motivation for the merger was for Korth to step back after over 30 years in the industry. In approving the TIA merger, the CAB went against the recommendation of its own administrative law judge and its own internal Bureau of Operating Rights, both of which recommended against the merger on competitive grounds. The Board itself, however, saw the two companies as largely complementary. In the year ending September 30, 1974, TIA made 84% of its revenue from passenger travel, whereas Saturn's revenue was 64% air-freight, and, moreover, as previously noted, in November 1974 it exited the passenger business entirely. The CAB saw the combined company as better able to compete against both foreign carriers and US scheduled carriers. It noted Saturn's highest-among-supplementals profits (above those of TIA, almost twice Saturn's size in revenue), despite being only the fourth largest in revenue. In 1975, TIA's revenues were $123.5mm (over $720mm in 2025 terms) whereas Saturn's were $65.9mm (over $400mm in 2025 terms).

The merger took two and a half years to arrange and consummate. When first disclosed, the price was 1.8 million shares of TIA-parent Transamerica Corporation valued at $15 million. By the time the CAB approved the deal in 1976, Saturn's profits were much improved (as the table shows). Korth renegotiated the transaction to almost 2.6 million shares of Transamerica which, when the deal closed in November 1976, was worth $35 million (over $190 million in 2025 terms).

Korth became the single-largest shareholder of Transamerica Corporation and a member of its board, as well as a vice chair of TIA.

== Fleet ==
At the time the merger with AAXICO was being evaluated by the CAB, Saturn had eight Douglas DC-7Cs, six of them leased, two of them owned.

December 1967:

- 15 Douglas DC-6

As of August 1971:

- 2 Douglas DC-8-61CF
- 1 Douglas DC-8-50
- 3 Lockheed L-100-20 Hercules
- 4 Lockheed L-100-30 Hercules

31 December 1973:

- 10 Lockheed L-100-30 Hercules
- 9 Lockheed L-188C Electra freighters
- 3 Douglas DC-8-61CF
- 1 Douglas DC-8-54F

At the time the merger with Trans International was being evaluated by the CAB, Saturn operated:

- 12 Lockheed L-100 Hercules
- 9 Lockheed L-188C Electra freighters

Saturn ordered but did not operate, three Boeing 707-369Cs for delivery in 1968. The aircraft passed on to Ethiopian Airlines (serial 19820), BOAC (19821) and Varig (19822) because Saturn wanted commonality across a DC-8 fleet. External links has a link to a photo of one of them.

== Accidents and incidents ==
- 11 August 1951 C-46F N3908B operating on a flight to Philadelphia from Newark, New Jersey suffered a loss of directional control on takeoff, overrunning the end of the runway into a swampy area. The four crew and 41 passengers on board evacuated safely before the aircraft was consumed by fire.
- 24 January 1967 DC-6 registration N74841 on a training flight applied asymmetric thrust on landing at Oakland, California, causing the aircraft to swerve off the runway and into mud, collapsing part of the landing gear and ripping off two propellers. The pilot in charge was cited for improper supervision. The four crew were safe but the aircraft was damaged beyond economic repair.
- 31 January 1967 DC-6A registration N640NA was operating on a cargo flight to Kelly Air Force Base in San Antonio, Texas from Davis-Monthan Air Force Base in Tucson, Arizona. Due to heavy fog, the crew diverted to San Antonio International Airport. The airplane descended 1100 feet below the glide slope, flew through trees and collided with a cliff, with the resulting destruction of the aircraft and deaths of three crew on board.
- October 10, 1970 Lockheed L-100-20 Hercules registration N9248R on a flight from Wright-Patterson Air Force Base became disoriented on approach to McGuire Air Force Base due to fog and glare and crashed into trees about a mile short of the runway, killing all three crew on board. The aircraft was sold to Saturn by Airlift International the day before and flown by an Airlift crew.
- 23 May 1974 Lockheed L-100-30 Hercules registration N14ST was en-route from Alameda, California to Indianapolis when the left wing failed due to metal fatigue, causing the aircraft to crash near Springfield, Illinois. Three crew and a Navy courier perished and the aircraft was destroyed.

== See also ==
- AAXICO Airlines
- Trans International Airlines
- Supplemental air carrier
- Logair
- Quicktrans
- List of defunct airlines of the United States
