= Knapsack, Germany =

Coordinates: 50°52′N 06°51′E

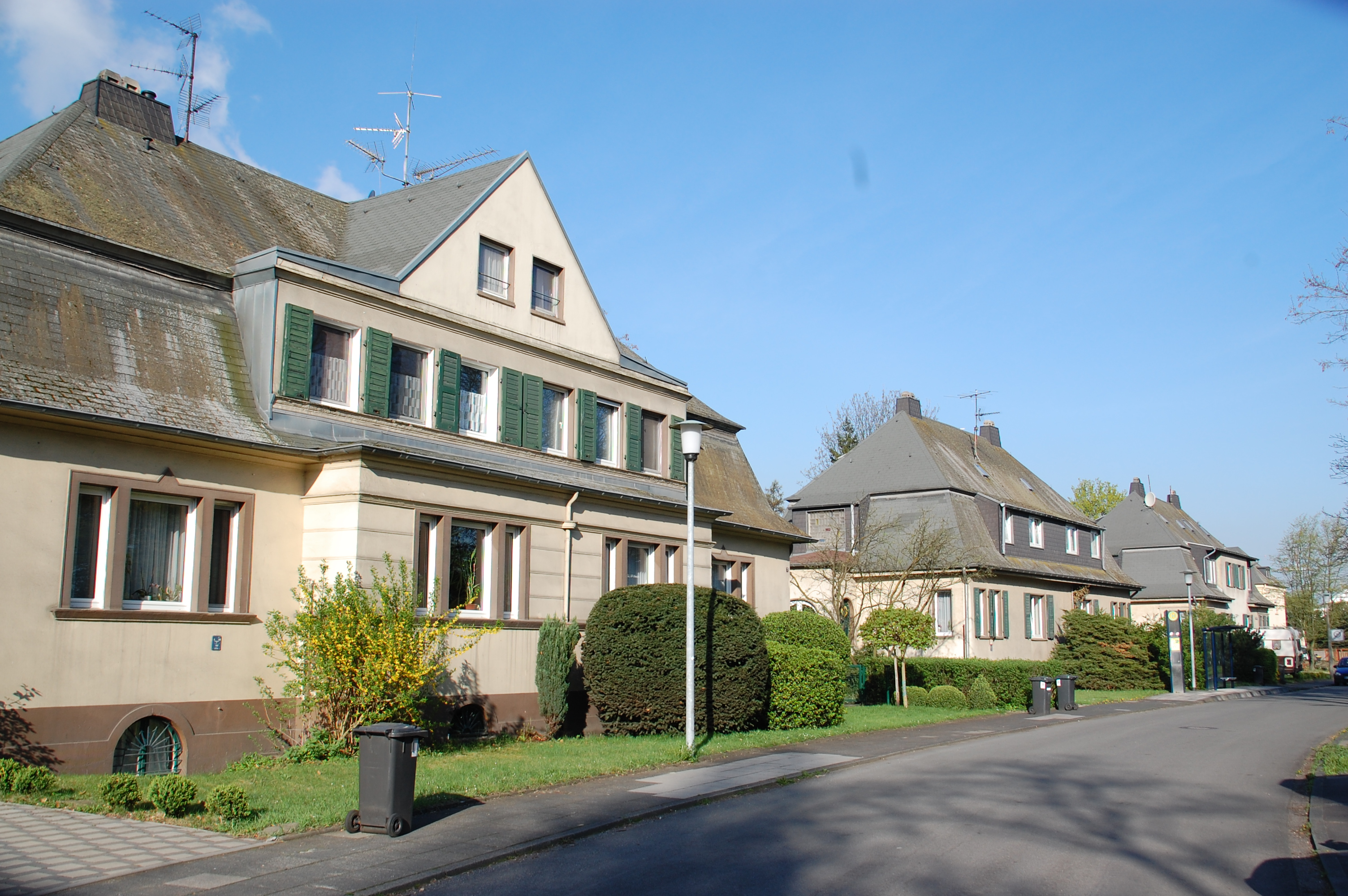
Settlement in Knapsack, former buildings for chemists

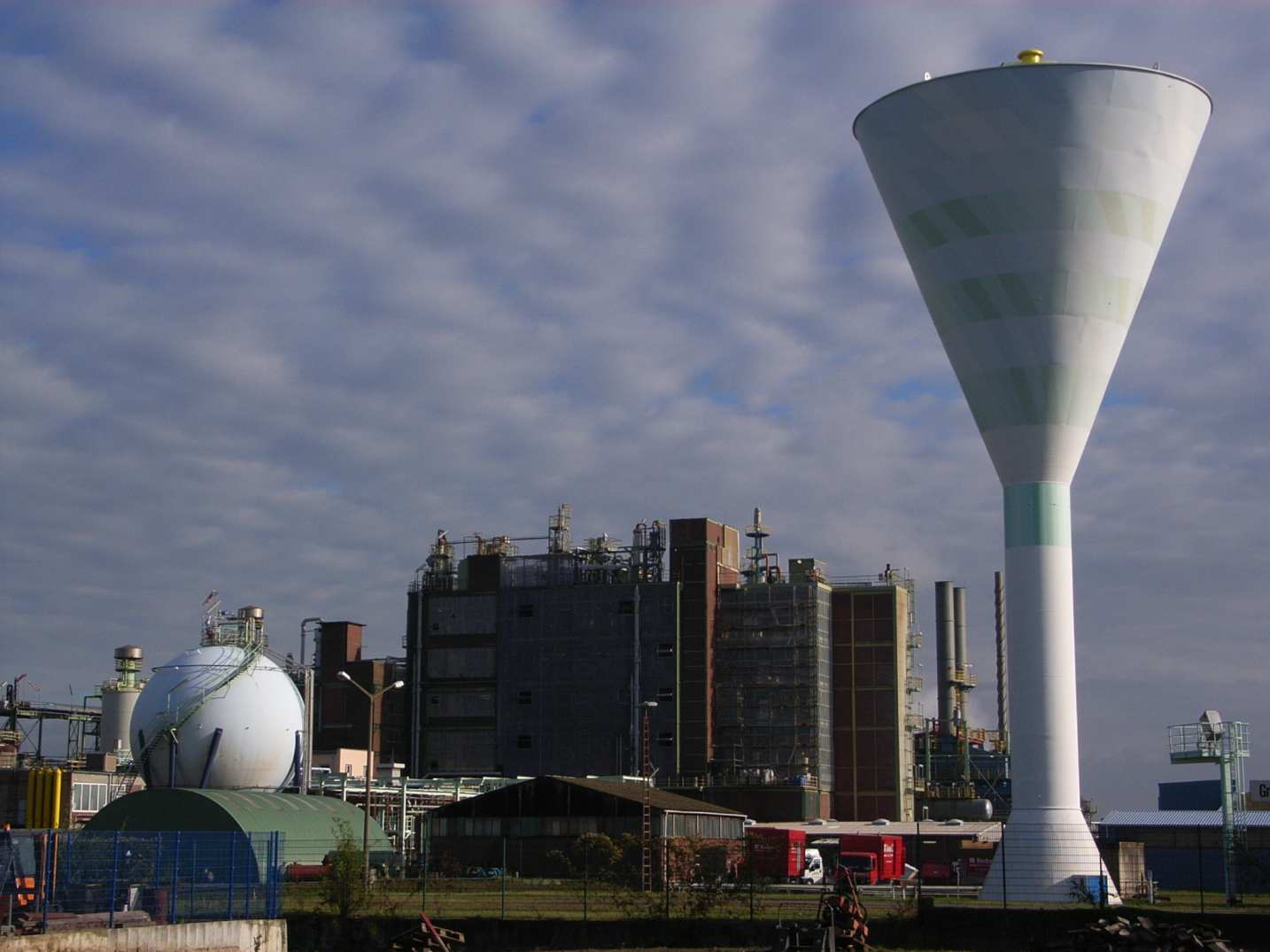
Chemical park with water tower

Knapsack is a locality of Hürth, Rhine-Erft district, North Rhine-Westphalia, Germany.

On Wednesday 17 October 2007, King Harald of Norway opened Statkraft's first gas power plant at Knapsack in Germany. The plant will have an installed capacity of 800 MW.

== History ==
Knapsack, its first documentary mention in 1566, started to emerge into a notable village after 1900 due to establishment and development of industry (1906 the Knapsack-Griesheim AG, later part of the Hoechst AG; 1913 construction of the brown coal power plant Goldenberg-Werk).

During World War II the RAF bombed the Knapsack power-station several times. The first raid was a low-level daylight raid on 12 August 1941 by 54 Bristol Blenheims under the command of Wing Commander Nichol of No. 114 Squadron RAF. The Blenheims hit their targets (the Goldenberg Power Station in Knapsack and the Fortuna Power Station in Quadrath) but twelve of the Blenheims were lost during the raid, 22 percent of those that took part which was far above the sustainable loss rate of less than five. A further raid took place on the night of 2/3 October 1943 with 12 OBOE Mosquitos, and a second attack that year was another night attack on 21/22 December 1943 by 4 Mosquitos.

Due to environmental constraints, 4000 citizens had to be resettled between the years 1969 and 1979.

== See also ==
Commons:Hürth-Knapsack gallery of local photographs
