= Mid America Museum of Aviation and Transportation =

Mid America Museum of Aviation & Transportation
- Location within Iowa
- Former name: World's Biggest Mini Air Museum; Mid America Air Museum; Warner Museum of Aviation and Transportation
- Established: 1990
- Location: Sioux City, Iowa
- Coordinates: 42.4139°N 96.3742°W
- Type: Aviation museum
- Founder: Maurice Topf
- Website: www.midamericaairmuseum.org

The Mid America Museum of Aviation & Transportation is an aviation museum located at the Sioux Gateway Airport in Sioux City, Iowa.

== History ==
=== Establishment ===
The Siouxland Historical Aviation Association was formed in Spring 1990 with the goal of establishing an aviation museum. (Note: The association was the result of the combination of two groups: one from a local Experimental Aircraft Association chapter led by Maurice Topf and the other a members of the 185th Tactical Fighter Group.) The group received approval from the airport to build a museum on 20 acres (0.081 km^{2}) of property at the northwest corner of the airport in 1993. In 1996, it began lobbying the city to allow the organization to restore a former terminal building that was planned for demolition. The World's Biggest Mini Air Museum opened 1 June 1996 in a complex of six former Air National Guard buildings. However, in January 2002, the then Mid America Air Museum was informed that the buildings it occupied would have to be demolished for a ramp expansion to accommodate aerial refueling aircraft for the 185th Air Refueling Wing. It then moved to a temporary location in downtown Sioux City.

=== New building ===
The museum launched a capital campaign for a new 62,500 sq ft (5,810 m^{2}) building in May 2002 and changed its name to Mid America Museum of Aviation & Transportation. Just under two years later, it had raised half of the necessary funding. The museum changed its name to the Warner Museum of Aviation and Transportation after receiving a donation from Jim Warner of the Warner Group in 2007 that made up the difference. It broke ground on a new 30,000 sq ft (2,800 m^{2}) building at the Sioux Gateway Airport in April 2009. Shortly thereafter, the museum received a Boeing 727 from FedEx. The museum opened to the public on 5 March 2010. By the end of September, it had changed its name back to Mid America Museum of Aviation & Transportation.

Construction on a new memorial to United Airlines Flight 232 began in May 2014. Two months later, the museum held a three day event on the 25th anniversary of the crash. Three years later, the museum acquired a twelfth scale model of a DC-10 for its Flight 232 exhibit.

In 2022, the museum received a grant to turn the interior of its Boeing 727 into a STEM learning center.

Before its demolition in April 2026, a number of parts of a former Sioux City Army Air Base chapel were recovered by the museum for use in a future exhibit.

== Exhibits ==
An exhibit about United Airlines Flight 232 includes a model of a DC-10, the damaged pilot's seat and a map of the aircraft's flight path. Outside there is a memorial to the flight at the initial impact site.

== Collection ==
- Armstrong Whitworth Argosy E.1
- Boeing 727-277
- Fairchild C-123K Provider
- Grumman EA-6A Intruder

== Programs ==
The museum holds STEM programs for children.

== See also ==
- National Museum of Transportation
