= Armstrong Whitworth AW.660 Argosy =

1959 transport aircraft family by Armstrong Whitworth

AW.650 & AW.660 Argosy
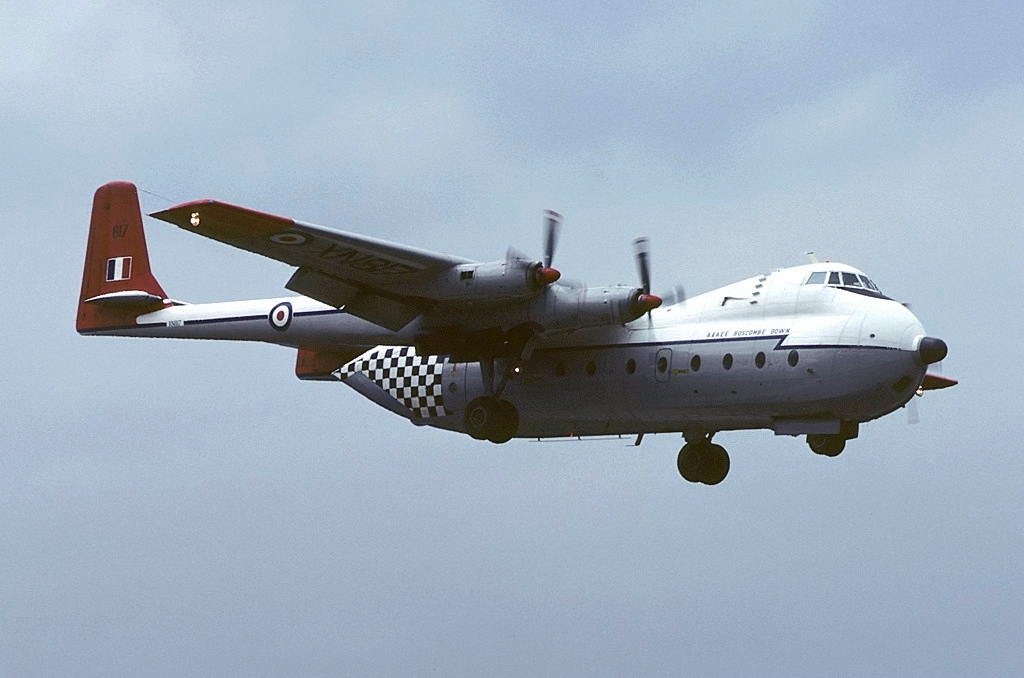
- A&AEE Armstrong-Whitworth AW.660 Argosy C Mk.1

General information
- Type: Cargo Transport
- Manufacturer: Armstrong Whitworth
- Status: Retired
- Primary users: Royal Air Force Universal Airlines/ Zantop Air Transport; British European Airways; IPEC Aviation; Transair-Midwest
- Number built: 74

History
- Introduction date: October 1961
- First flight: 8 January 1959
- Retired: 1978 (Royal Air Force); 1991 (Civil)

The Armstrong Whitworth Argosy is a British post-war transport/cargo aircraft. It was the final aircraft to be designed and produced by the aviation company Armstrong Whitworth Aircraft. Although given different internal design numbers, the AW.650 civil and AW.660 military models were, for most practical purposes, the same design and shared the "Argosy" name.

Development of the Argosy originates in the AW.66, a proposed twin-engined military transport that was designed with British Air Ministry's Operational Requirement 323 (OR323) in mind. While Armstrong Whitworth terminated work on the AW.66, it decided to go forward with a civilian-oriented derivative of the design, designated AW.65, as it was judged to be commercially viable. The AW.65 was redesigned to use four Rolls-Royce Dart turboprop engines, and thus was re-designated as the AW.650. On 8 January 1959, the first Argosy conducted the type's maiden flight. In December 1960, the type received Federal Aviation Administration (FAA) type certification, enabling the initial civil version, referred to as the Series 100, to enter civil service across most parts of the world.

In Britain, military planners took interest in the Argosy and released a new specification for a militarised variant, designated AW.660. First flown on 4 March 1961, this model featured double the range of the Series 100 and otherwise differed by an alternative door arrangement, which was largely to facilitate paratroop operations. Furthermore, an improved civil variant, the Series 200, was introduced at the behest of airline British European Airways (BEA). First flown on 11 March 1964, this model featured a new wing incorporating a fail safe structure, being stronger and lighter than its original counterpart. The Argosy was operated by both the Royal Air Force (RAF) and various civil operators across the globe for numerous years. The type was withdrawn from RAF service during 1978, while the last Argosy was retired from civil operations during 1991.

== Development ==
=== Background ===
The development of the Argosy can be traced back to the development of Operational Requirement 323 (OR323) by the British Air Ministry. During 1955, a specification was issued based upon OR323, which sought a medium-range freight aircraft that would be capable of lifting a maximum payload of 25,000 lb (11,340 kg), while also possessing a range of 2,000 mi (3,200 km) when carrying up to 10,000 lb (4,500 kg). British aviation manufacturer Armstrong Whitworth Aircraft took interest in this specification and decided to allocate members of its design team to the task of developing a suitable aircraft to meet its demands. Initially, design efforts were focused upon a twin-engine design intended for military use, which was internally designated as the AW.66.

As it was recognised that the aircraft held sales potential within the civil market, a civilian-oriented variant, designated AW.65, was also designed alongside the military design; the AW.65 principally differed from the AW.66 via the installation of full-section doors at each end of the fuselage to enable rapid loading and unloading operations. However, a lack of available finance contributed to the company's decision to abandon all work towards meeting the military requirement; despite this setback, Armstrong Whitworth had already decided to proceed with developing the civil variant as a private venture. The company believed that the type would have significant appeal to the growing short-haul air freight sector of both the European and American markets. At that time, no other aircraft had been purpose-designed for such a purpose. As work continued, the AW.65 was extensively redesigned, including the adoption of four Rolls-Royce Dart turboprop engines; the resulting aircraft being designated as the AW.650.

On 8 January 1959, the first Argosy performed its maiden flight. It appeared during that year's Farnborough Airshow, by which point five aircraft were flying, having cumulatively amassed about 400 flight hours between them. Certification-related testing of the type was reportedly completed during September 1960. In December 1960, the Argosy received type certification from the American Federal Aviation Administration (FAA), authorising the aircraft's entry to commercial service. 10 of the initial civil version, the Series 100, were built; construction of these aircraft had commenced months prior to receiving certification so that deliveries could commence as soon as possible.

=== Further development ===
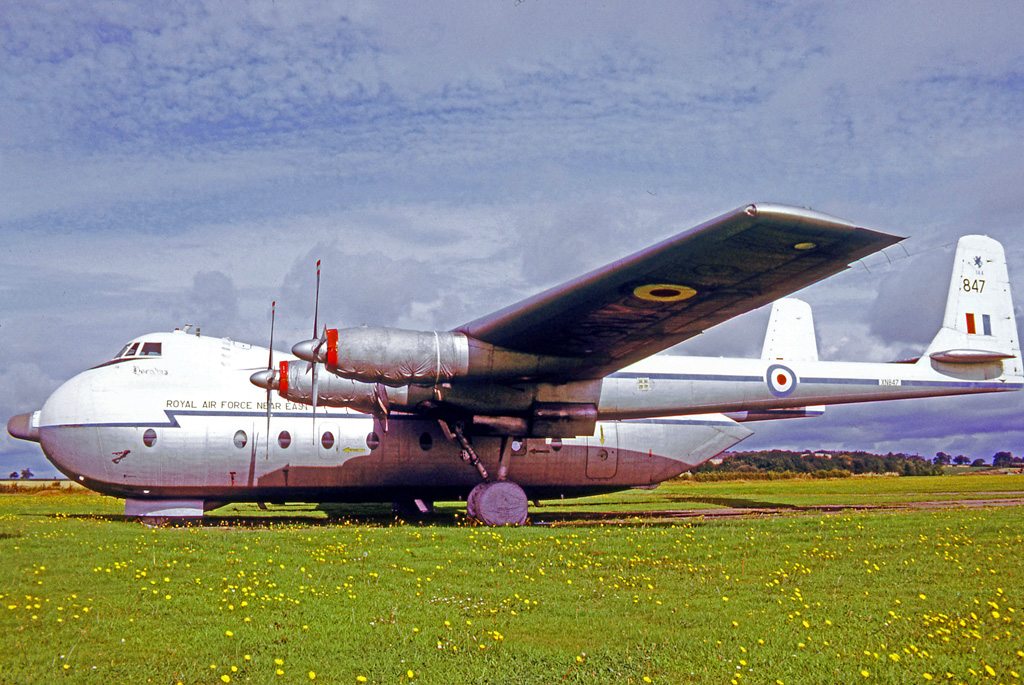
Argosy C.1 of No. 70 Squadron in 1971

While the RAF had lost interest in any acquisition of the original AW.66 design, the service still needed to procure a replacement for its obsolete piston engined transport fleet, including the Vickers Valetta and Handley Page Hastings. During 1959, the British Air Ministry released a new specification that called for a military derivative of the AW.650, the envisioned aircraft was intended to serve in multiple roles, including as a medium-range transport, paratroop and supply aircraft. The resultant design, which was designated AW.660, was significantly different from the AW.650. Changes included the sealing of the nose door, its location being instead occupied by the radome of a weather radar unit, while the rear doors were substituted for by an alternative clamshell style which incorporated an integral loading ramp, while a stronger cargo floor was also installed. A pair of additional doors were fitted, one each on the starboard and port sides, which enabled paratroopers to exit. The military Argosy was powered by an arrangement of four Rolls-Royce Dart 101 turboprops and possessed twice the range of the civil Series 100. From July 1960, the second Argosy Series 100 was used to flight-test the new clamshell door design. On 4 March 1961, the first of the 56 Argosies destined for RAF service performed its first flight.

Early on, civil operator British European Airways (BEA) had shown open interest in the Argosy, the company viewed the aircraft as a potential replacement for its existing piston engined freighters; however, evaluations of the Series 100 soon found that its payload capacity would not allow for the type to operate profitably. Early on, as a measure taken to reduce design costs, the wing of the Argosy had been based on that of the Avro Shackleton, a maritime patrol aircraft that was developed and built by another entity within the Hawker Siddeley Group; in order to satisfy BEA's requirements, a new wing was designed which shared the same aerodynamic design, but benefitted from a more modern fail-safe structure rather than the safe-life design used on the earlier wing. This change resulted in a wing that was both stronger and lighter, but was also no longer limited in terms of its fatigue life. The revised version, designated as the Series 200, also featured several other improvements, including the adoption of enlarged cargo doors, integral wing fuel tanks and a modified landing gear arrangement. The Series 200 reportedly had better handling than the older Series 100, although some aerodynamic refinements were required during testing.

On 11 March 1964, the first Series 200 aircraft conducted its first flight; it was soon followed by six more Series 220s, which were outfitted with more powerful engines. While work had commenced upon another Series 220, this airframe was never completed and was ultimately scrapped. According to the aviation periodical Flight International, the Argosy had been negatively impacted by the emergence of the long-haul passenger jet, as many surplus propeller-driven aircraft had been converted to freighters during this era, thus driving down both demand and prices for new-build cargo aircraft.

== Design ==
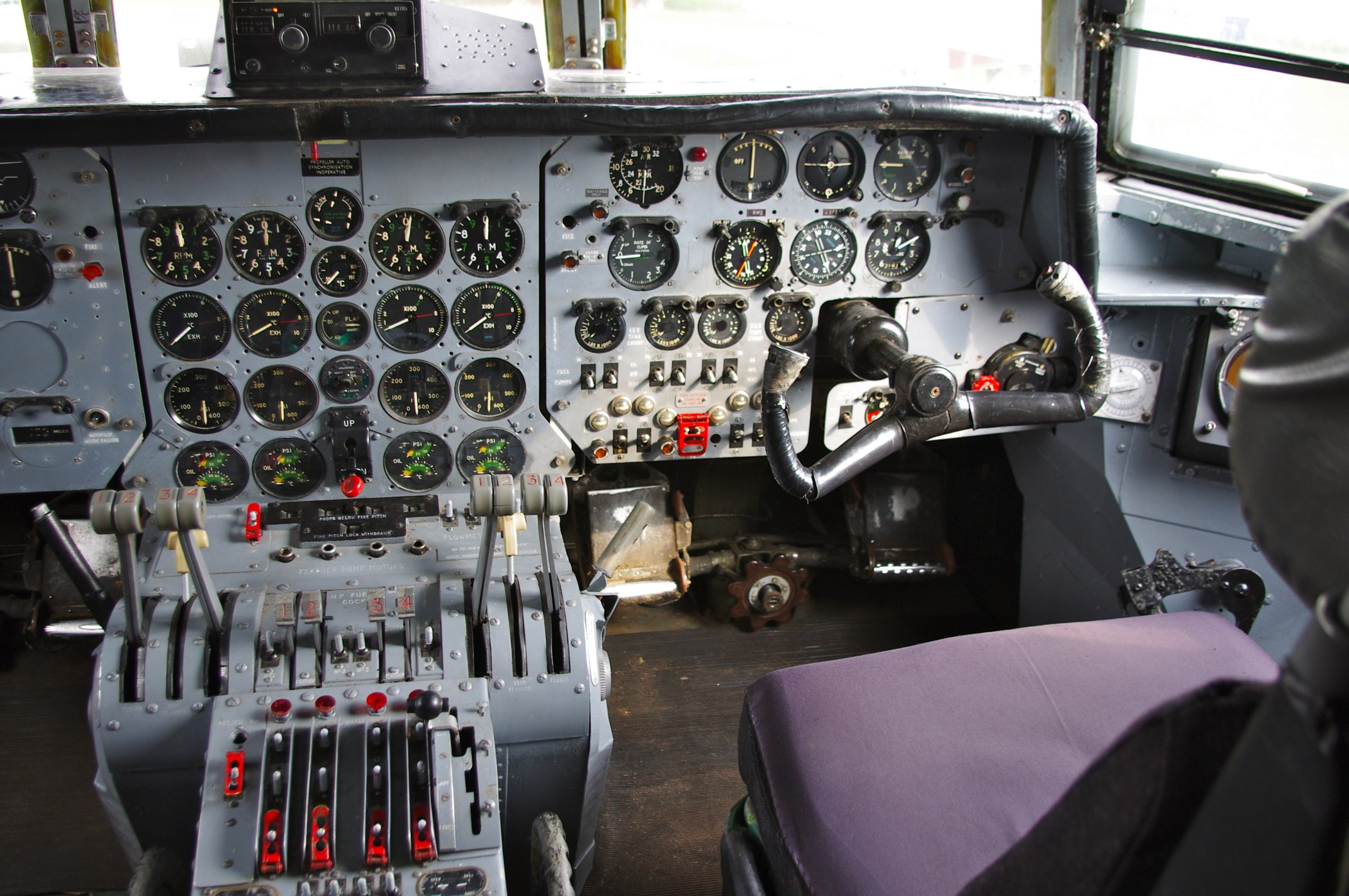
Cockpit of the Argosy

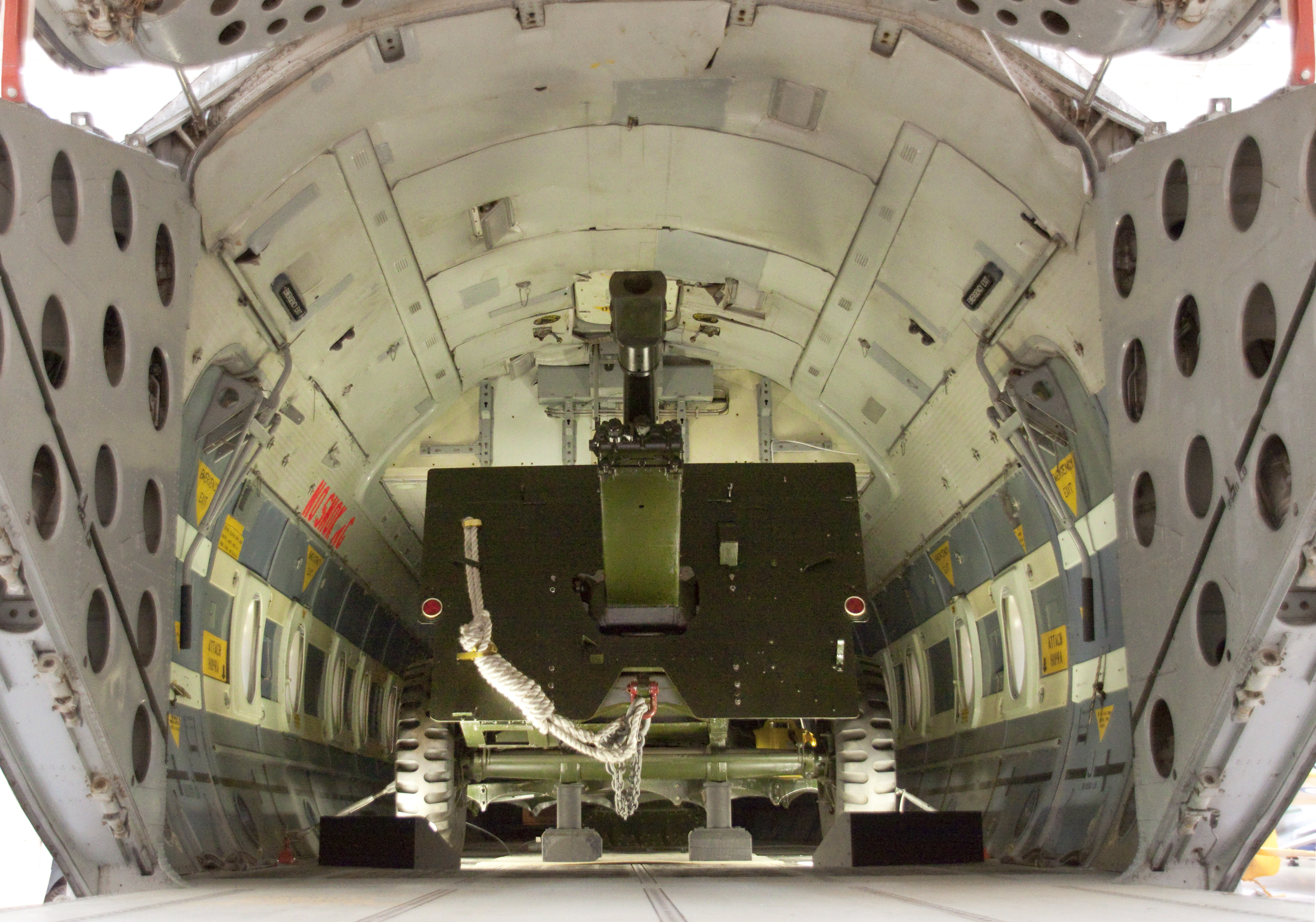
A 25 pounder gun-howitzer on the cargo deck of an Argosy

The Armstrong Whitworth Argosy was a general-purpose transport aircraft largely used for freight operations by both military and civil operators. At the time of its introduction, the type was considered to be unique in its class. Principally designed as a freighter, the aircraft could also be used for other tasks. The Argosy was offered in a convertible configuration for carrying both freight and passengers; the civil variant could accommodate a maximum of 80 passengers while providing comfort and speed conditions comparable to the contemporary Vickers Viscount airliners. In the cargo role, the Argosy was designed for rapid turnaround times of only 20 minutes without the use of lifting trucks or cranes, utilising pallets and rollers to eliminate packaging.

In terms of its basic configuration, the Argosy's tailplane was mounted on twin booms that ran rearwards from the inner engine nacelles, leaving the cargo doors at the rear of the fuselage clear for straight-in loading. Sideways-opening doors were fitted at both ends of the fuselage and the flight deck was set above the freight hold. This configuration allowed for an unobstructed cargo space measuring 10 by 47 feet (3.0 m × 14.3 m) with a sill height corresponding to that of a normal flatbed truck. It had a maximum weight of 88,000 lb (39,915 kg) and a payload of 28,000 lb (12,700 kg). When cruising at 276 mph (444 km/h), it had a range of 1,780 mi (2,865 km) and could seat a maximum of 89 passengers.

The Argosy was powered by four Rolls-Royce Dart turboprop engines with Rotol-built four-blade propellers. The power rating of the engines depended on the aircraft variant. The sound produced by the Dart engines combined with its relatively unusual "pod and boom" basic configuration, which was similar to the earlier C-82 Packet and C-119 Flying Boxcar transport aircraft, has been attributed as the source of the type's nickname "The Whistling Wheelbarrow".

== Operational history ==
=== Civil use ===
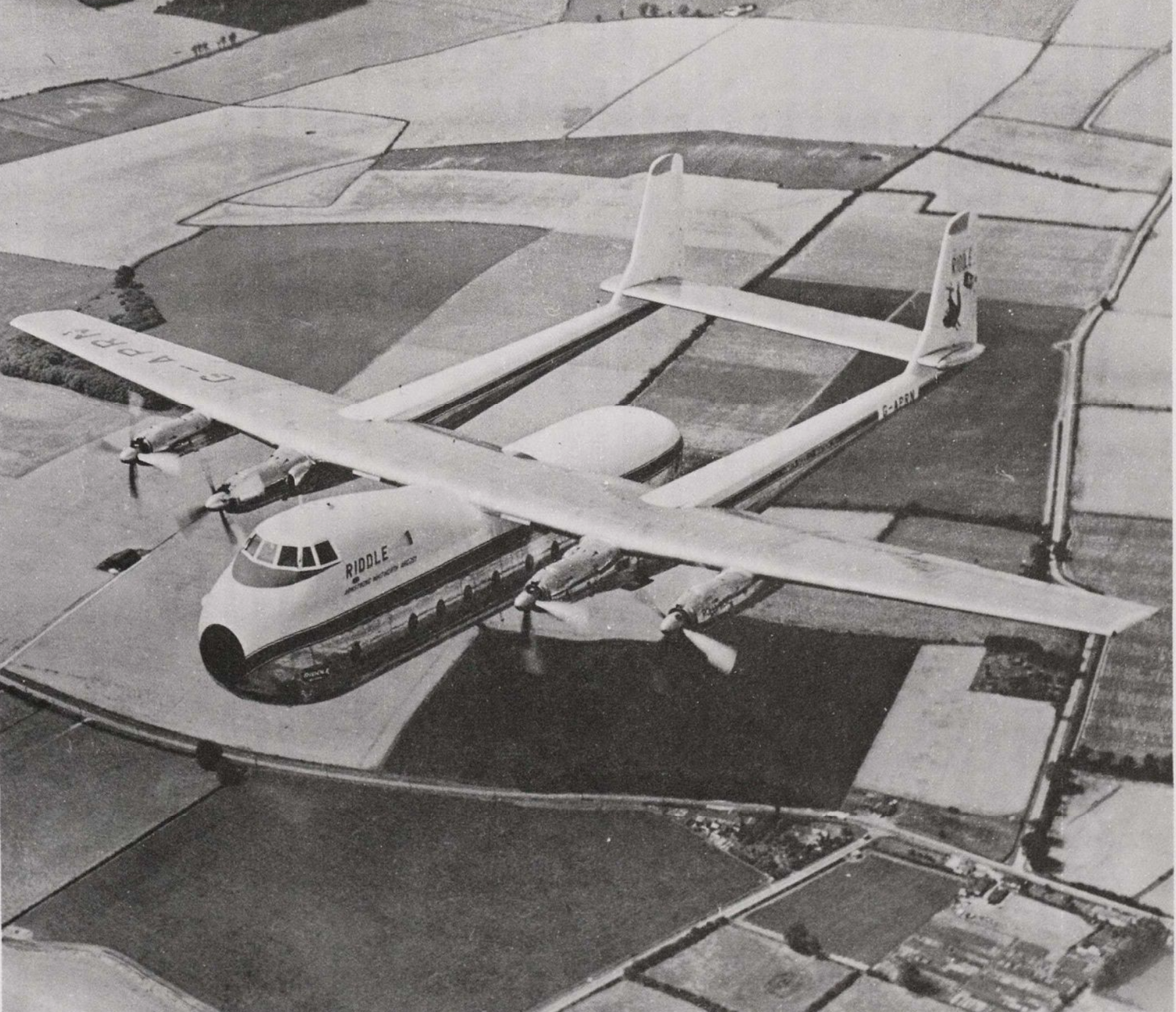
AW.650 in Riddle Airlines livery 1960

==== United States ====
Argosies operated within the United States on and off over a 30 year period, with the focus being flying on behalf of US government entities.

The Argosy Series 100 (aka AW.650) first entered service with the American cargo airline Riddle Airlines (later known as Airlift International). In the late 1950s, Riddle wanted to replace its large fleet of Curtiss C-46s and saw potential in the Argosy. In 1960, Riddle was awarded a US domestic Logair freight contract by the US Air Force on the basis of a five aircraft AW.650 fleet. See External links for a picture of a Riddle Argosy with Logair titles. A contemporary article noted the modestly-sized Argosy was well suited to Logair, being well adapted to a short-range system due to its ability to load and unload within 15 minutes. The Argosy's roller-floor system was modified to work with the US military's 463L pallet, of which the Argosy could accommodate 10.

But Riddle was financially distressed and unable to profitably fly the Argosies. In 1962 it returned its fleet of seven Argosies to Armstrong Whitworth in return for being let off the financial hook. By July 1962, Capitol Airways bought five of the ex-Riddle machines to work for Logair. But Capitol made a decision to exit domestic military flying, and the Argosies were out of its fleet by year end 1965.

Zantop Air Transport bought its first two AW.650s in early 1963, again, to fly for Logair. Zantop lost one in an October 1965 crash, but when Zantop was sold, becoming Universal Airlines at year-end 1966, it was still operating the other six US aircraft (there was some confusion about Zantop's new name. The buyer initially called it Intercontinental before settling on Universal, FAA 1966 year-end fleet counts reflect the otherwise mysterious "Intercontinental"). Universal bought another two in 1968, reaching a total of eight. Universal still had four at August 1971, but in May 1972, Universal went bankrupt, ceasing operations. Other airlines stepped in to pick up parts of its business but apparently not the Argosies. See External links for a link to a photo of a Universal Airlines AW.650.

Three ex-Universal aircraft would go to Duncan Aviation of Lincoln, Nebraska, which operated them under contract to the US Department of the Interior supporting fire fighting in Alaska during summers from the early 1970s through 1991. Two aircraft were written off in Alaska in 1974. They were backfilled by an ex-RAF aircraft, XP447, which operated under US registration N1430Z. Duncan had another non operational ex-RAF aircraft (XR143) used as a source of parts. Duncan's were the last operational Argosies. See External links for a photo of the Duncan Aviation fleet in 1991 after its last season.

==== Outside the United States ====
As a stopgap measure, BEA had ordered Armstrong Whitworth's three remaining Series 100s, intending to use them until the airline could receive its definitive Series 220s; during 1964, BEA had placed an order for five such aircraft. Reportedly, the Argosy had contributed to BEA possessing a superior air freighting ability to any other airline operating in the region, the type's double-end loading capability being a viewed as a crucial part of its economics. During its operations of the type, the airline lost two Series 220s in separate crashes, choosing to purchase another Argosy to replace the first lost aircraft. Reportedly, BEA's small fleet of Argosies was found to be unprofitable, even when BEA introduced the more-capable Series 220s; this has been attributed to BEA procedures relating both to safety and general operations. During April 1970, BEA opted to withdraw its Argosy fleet, choosing to replacing the type using a freighter conversion of its Vickers Vanguards.

Two aircraft were operated by SAFE Air in New Zealand, where they formed the main link between the Chatham Islands and the mainland; these aircraft were fitted with a pressurised "passenger capsule". During April 1990, one of these aircraft was damaged beyond repair as a result of a landing accident; a third Argosy was leased by SAFE Air from Australian company Mayne Nickless for five months during 1990 as a short-term replacement. During September 1990, the final flight of a New Zealand Argosy was conducted by operator SAFE Air; the aircraft itself was retired and is presently being preserved by volunteer owners near Woodbourne Airport, Blenheim, New Zealand.

=== Military use ===
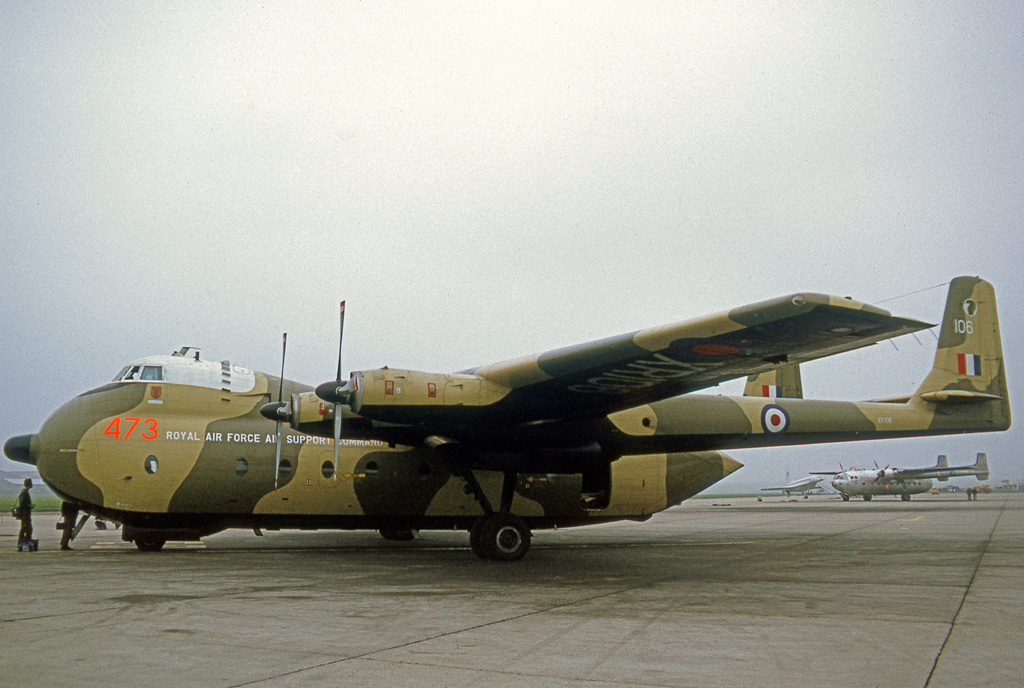
114 Squadron Argosy wearing the camouflage of the RAF Air Support Command in 1971

During the 1960s, the Argosy was procured for the Royal Air Force (RAF), the first of which entering service in March 1962. The service frequently made use of its capability to accommodate up to 69 troops, 48 stretcher cases or 29,000 lb (13,000 kg) of freight. Operationally, it could carry various items of military equipment, including combat vehicles such as the Saracen or Ferret armoured cars, or artillery such as the 105 mm (4.13 in) howitzer or Wombat. However, subsequent design changes to both the Saracen and the Argosy's mainspar (which ran throughout the top of its cargo bay) subsequently precluded the use of the Argosy as a Saracen transport.

During 1962, the earliest deployment of the Argosy was recorded as being performed to 105 Squadron, which was stationed in the Middle East, along with 114 and 267 Squadrons, based in the UK at RAF Benson. The following year, 215 Squadron received its Argosies, which were stationed at RAF Changi, Singapore. However, this squadron was disbanded on New Year's Eve 1967, its aircraft being re-allocated to 70 Squadron, based at RAF Akrotiri, Cyprus. 70 Squadron would be the final squadron to operate the aircraft in the transport role, retiring its last Argosy during February 1975. During December 1970, the RAF had begun receiving American-built Lockheed Hercules transport planes, which progressively replaced the Argosy fleet in the transport role. Between 1968 and 1978, the E.1 variant of the Argosy, which was used in the calibration role, was flown by 115 Squadron, which was based at RAF Cottesmore for much of this time period.

== Variants ==
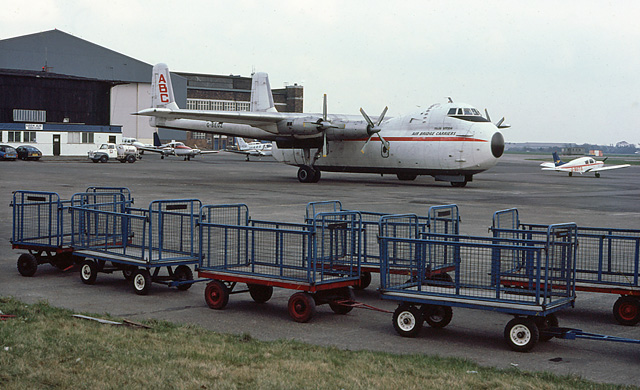
Argosy G-BEOZ, operating for Air Bridge Carriers at Liverpool Speke Airport in 1981

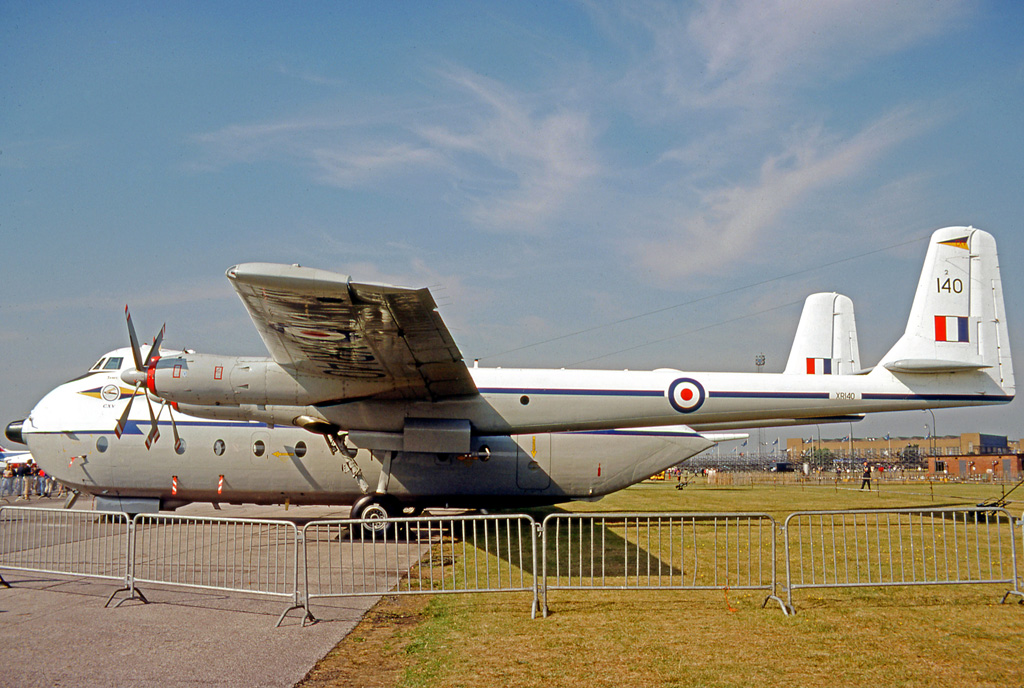
Operational Argosy E.1 of No. 115 Squadron RAF in 1977.

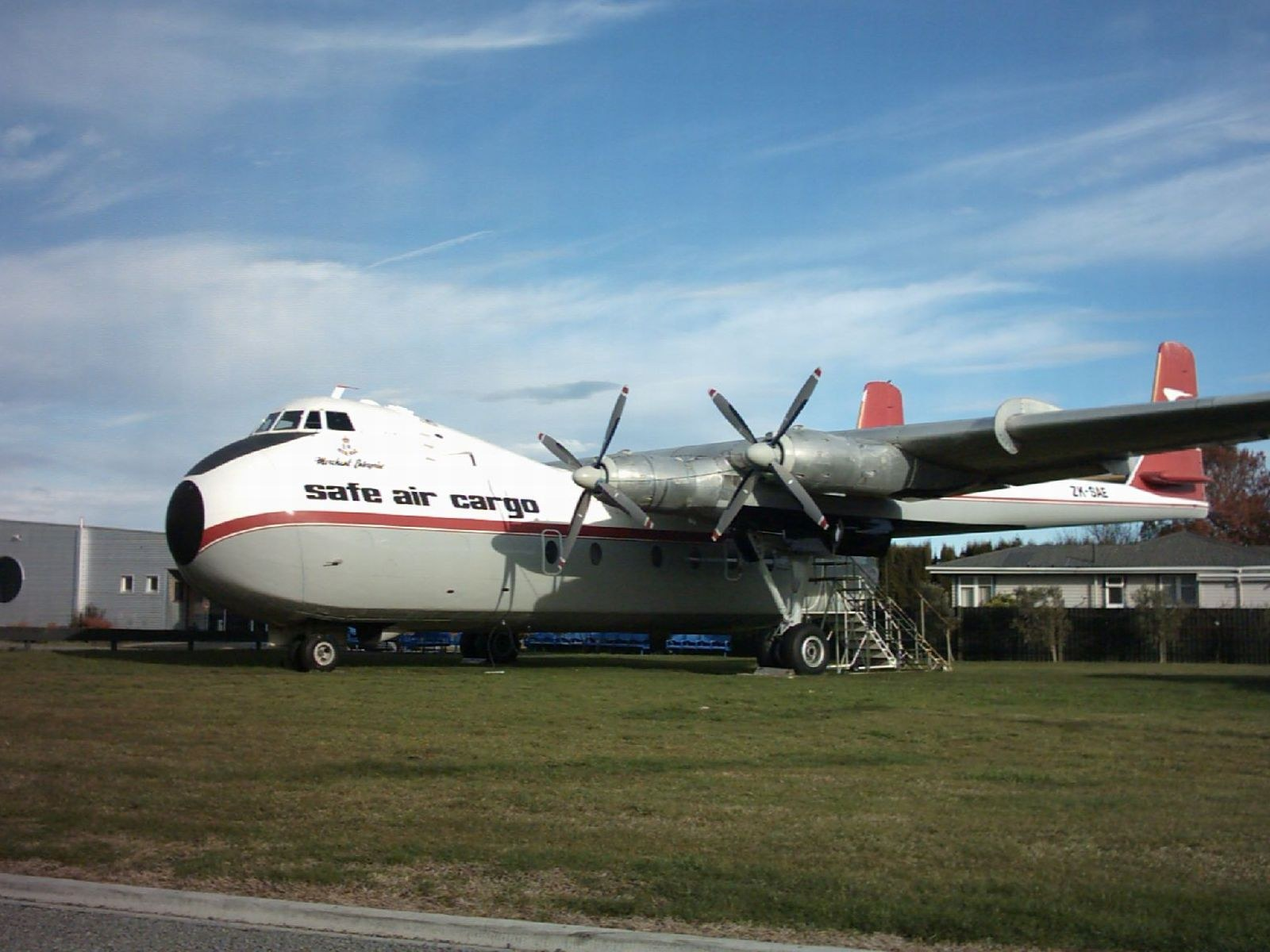
Argosy ZK-SAE, Merchant Enterprise, exhibited at Blenheim, New Zealand

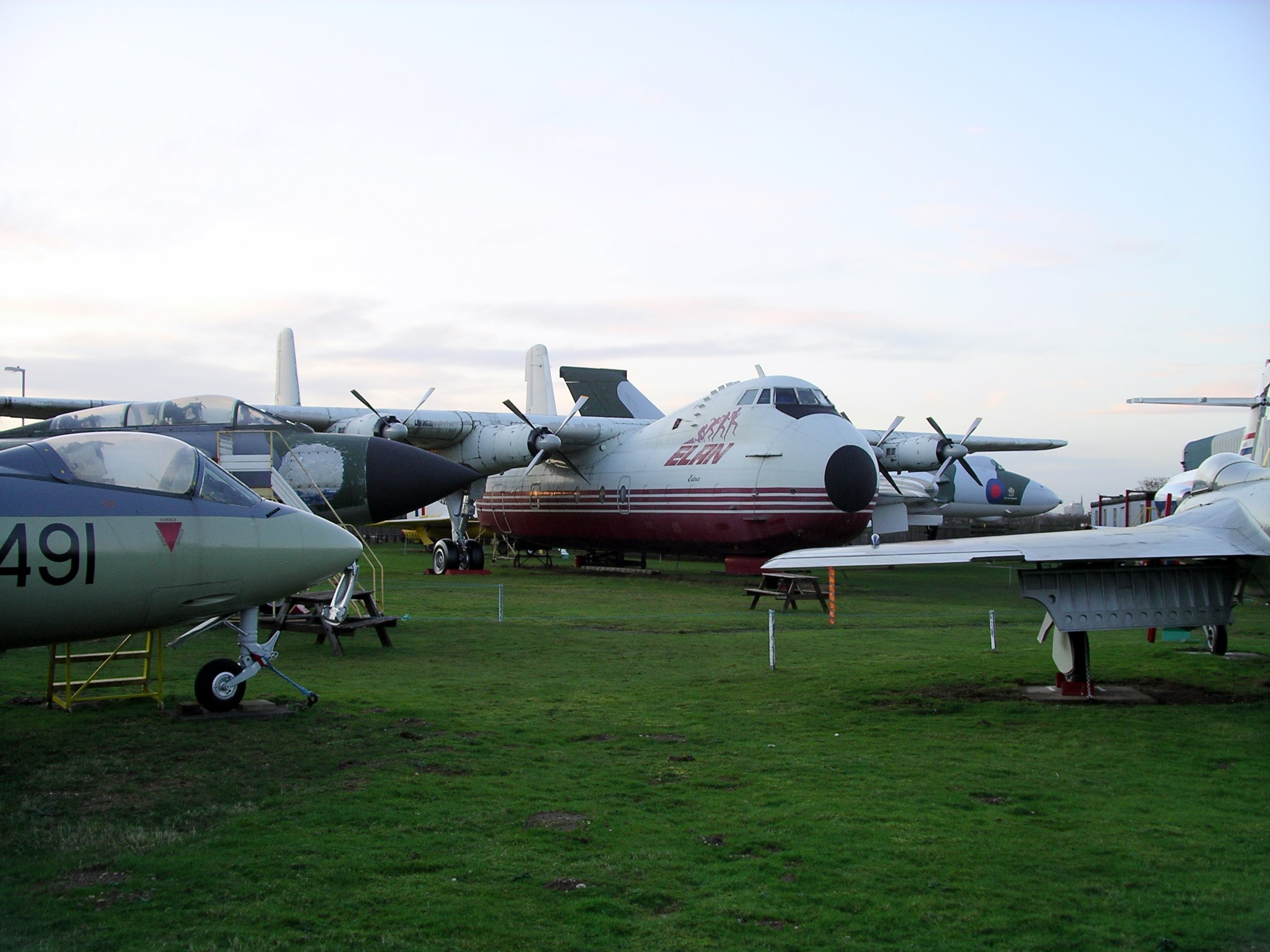
Armstrong Whitworth A.W.650 Argosy (series 101), at the Midland Air Museum, near Baginton, England

=== Armstrong Whitworth AW 650 Argosy (1959) ===
A total of 17 were built for civil operators Riddle Airlines (Series 101) and British European Airways (series 102 and 222).

10 Series 101 and 102 aircraft were built. Seven Series 200 aircraft were built (the eighth was not completed); the series 200 had a larger freight hold and enlarged front and rear doors to enable it to carry standard size cargo pallets. The series 200 also had a lighter redesigned wing increasing the maximum range and Rolls-Royce Dart 532/1 turboprops.

=== Armstrong Whitworth AW 660 Argosy ===
Additional differences to the civil variants:

- toilet and galley in the area of the deleted nose door
- EKCO weather radar in the nose
- Rover-APU in left tailboom
- up to 72 passenger seats, facing backwards
- additional fuel tanks in centre wing
- strengthened landing gear.

56 aircraft were produced for the RAF under the designation Argosy C Mk 1 (C.1), it served in a total of six squadrons; three based in the UK and one each in Aden, Cyprus, and the Far East. The RAF withdrew the Argosy from transport missions during 1975 as an economic measure. Those aircraft not scrapped or retained were sold to commercial operators.

=== Hawker Siddeley Argosy E Mk 1 ===
During 1963, Hawker Siddeley Group dropped the names of its component companies, rebranding its products under the Hawker Siddeley banner. To meet a requirement for a RAF flight inspection aircraft, nine Argosy C.1s were modified in 1971 as the Argosy E.1. These were a regular sight at British military airfields, being operated by 115 Squadron until they were replaced by the Hawker Siddeley Andover during 1978.

=== Hawker Siddeley Argosy T Mk 2 ===
After the removal of the Argosy C.1 from the cargo/transport role, it was decided to modify 14 aircraft as Navigation Trainers for RAF Training Command, which were intended to replace the Vickers Varsity. One aircraft XP411 was re-designated as the Argosy T Mk 1 in advance of delivery of the T Mk 2 fleet. Only two aircraft (XP447 and XR136) were modified as the Argosy T.2, but they were not successful, the programme having been abandoned as a consequence of defence spending cuts.

== Operators ==
=== Military operators ===
United Kingdom

- Royal Air Force
  - No. 70 Squadron RAF (based in Cyprus)
  - No. 105 Squadron RAF (based in Middle East)
  - No. 114 Squadron RAF (based in United Kingdom)
  - No. 115 Squadron RAF (based in United Kingdom with the Argosy E.1)
  - No. 215 Squadron RAF (based in Singapore)
  - No. 267 Squadron RAF (based in United Kingdom)
  - No. 242 Operational Conversion Unit RAF
  - No. 6 Flying Training School RAF
  - Empire Test Pilots School
- Kuwait Air Force (ex RAF example serial number unknown)

=== Civil operators ===
Australia

- Brain and Brown Airfreighters
- IPEC Aviation

Canada

- Transair-Midwest

Gabon

- SOACO

Ireland

- Aer Turas

Luxembourg

- Nittler Air Transport

New Zealand

- SAFE Air

Philippines

- Philippine Airlines

Singapore

- Kris Air

United Kingdom

- Air Anglia on season rent from Air Bridge Carriers
- Air Bridge Carriers
- British European Airways
- Elan Parcel Service
- Rolls-Royce
- Sagittair

United States

- Capitol Airways
- Duncan Aviation
- Riddle Airlines
- Universal Airlines
- Zantop Air Transport

Zaire

- Otrag Range Air Service

== Surviving aircraft ==
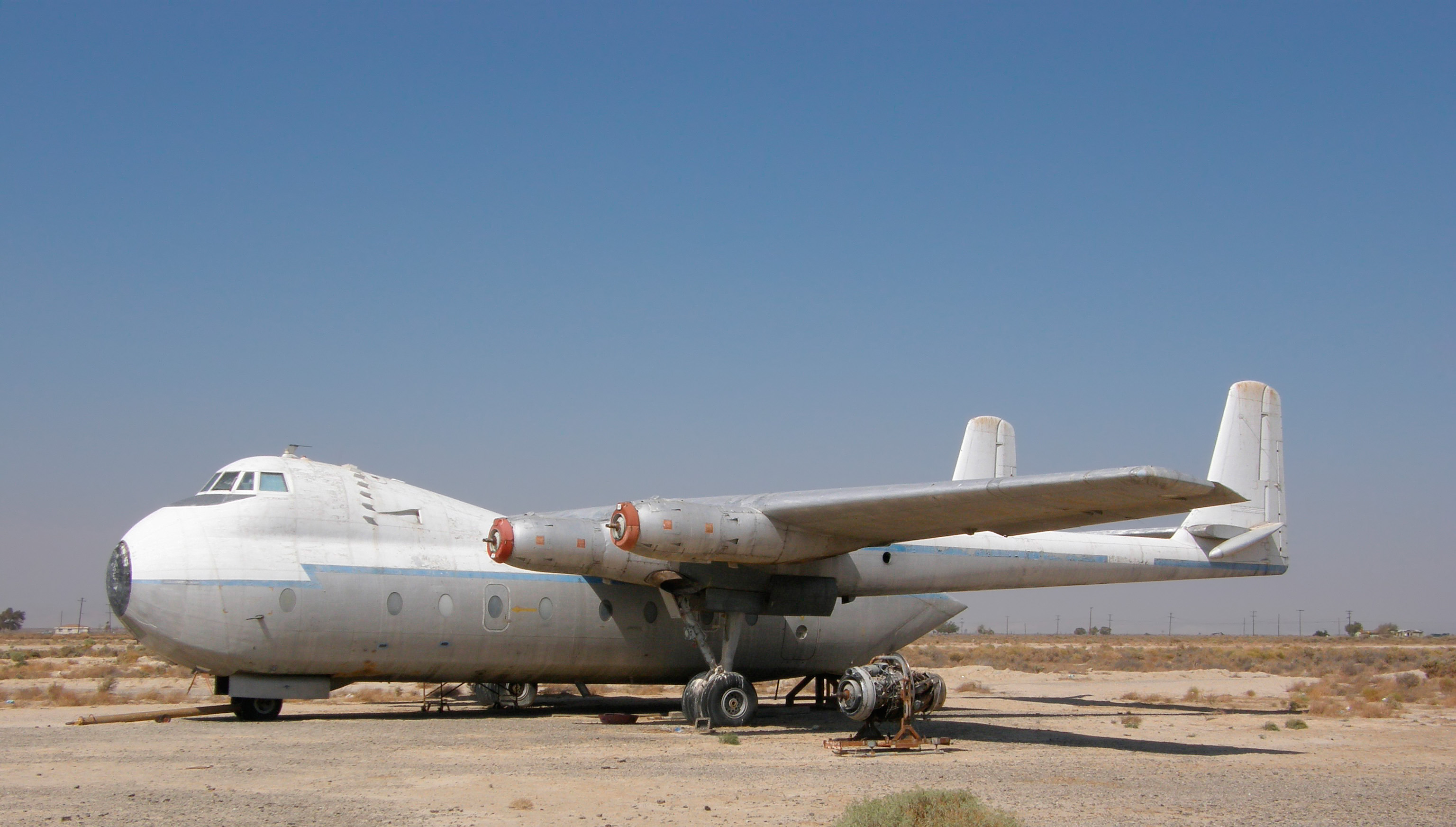
XP447 at Fox Field, Lancaster, California, USA.

New Zealand

- ZK-SAE Merchant Enterprise – 222 on static display near Woodbourne Airport in Blenheim, Marlborough.

United Kingdom

- G-APRL – 101 on static display at the Midland Air Museum in Baginton, Warwickshire.
- G-BEOZ – 101 on static display at the Aeropark in Castle Donington, Leicestershire.
- XN819 – C.1 cockpit on static display at the Newark Air Museum in Newark, Nottinghamshire.
- XP411 – C.1 on static display at the Royal Air Force Museum Cosford in Cosford, Shropshire.

United States

- XP447 – T.2 in storage at General William J. Fox Airfield in Lancaster, California.
- XR143 – E.1 in storage at the Mid America Museum of Aviation and Transportation in Sioux City, Iowa. Scrapped in November 2026.

== Specifications (Argosy C Mk 1) ==
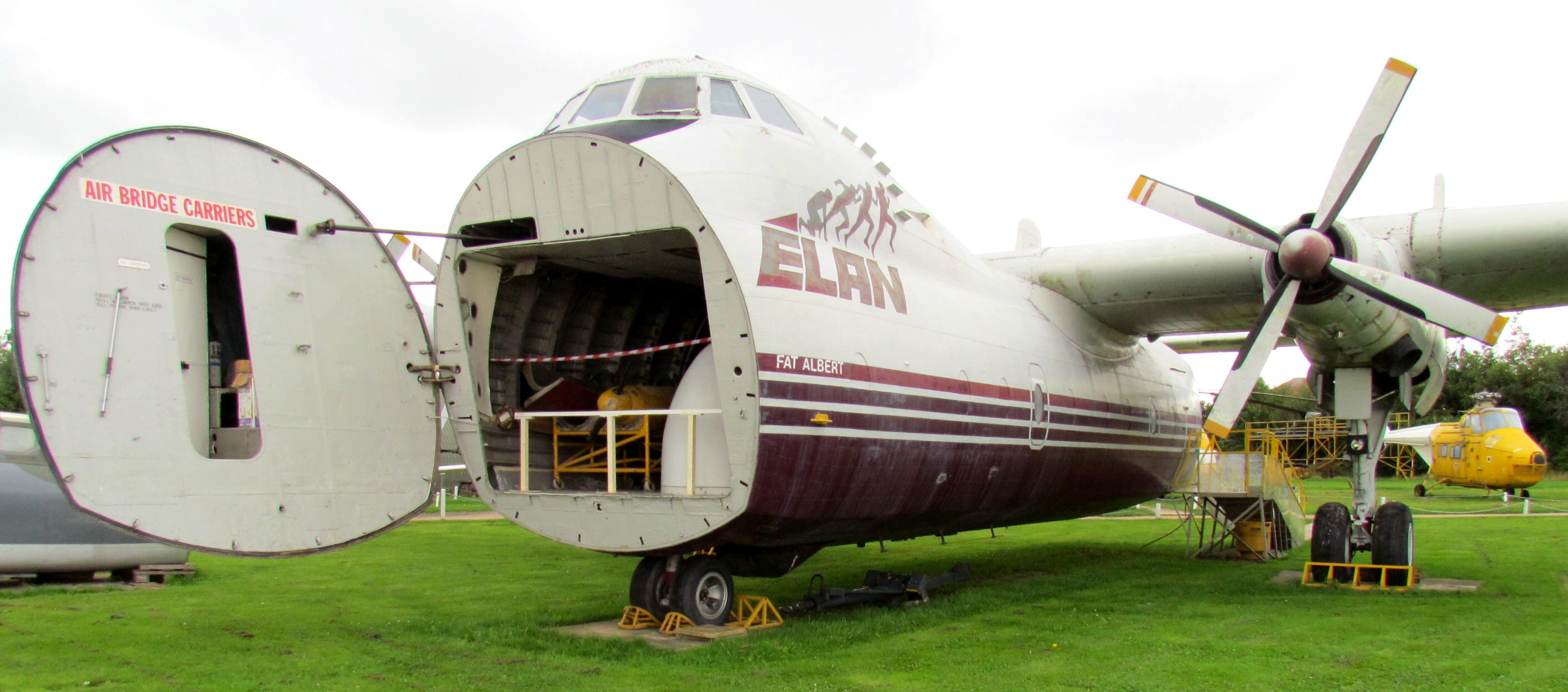
Forward view of the Argosy, note the open forward cargo door

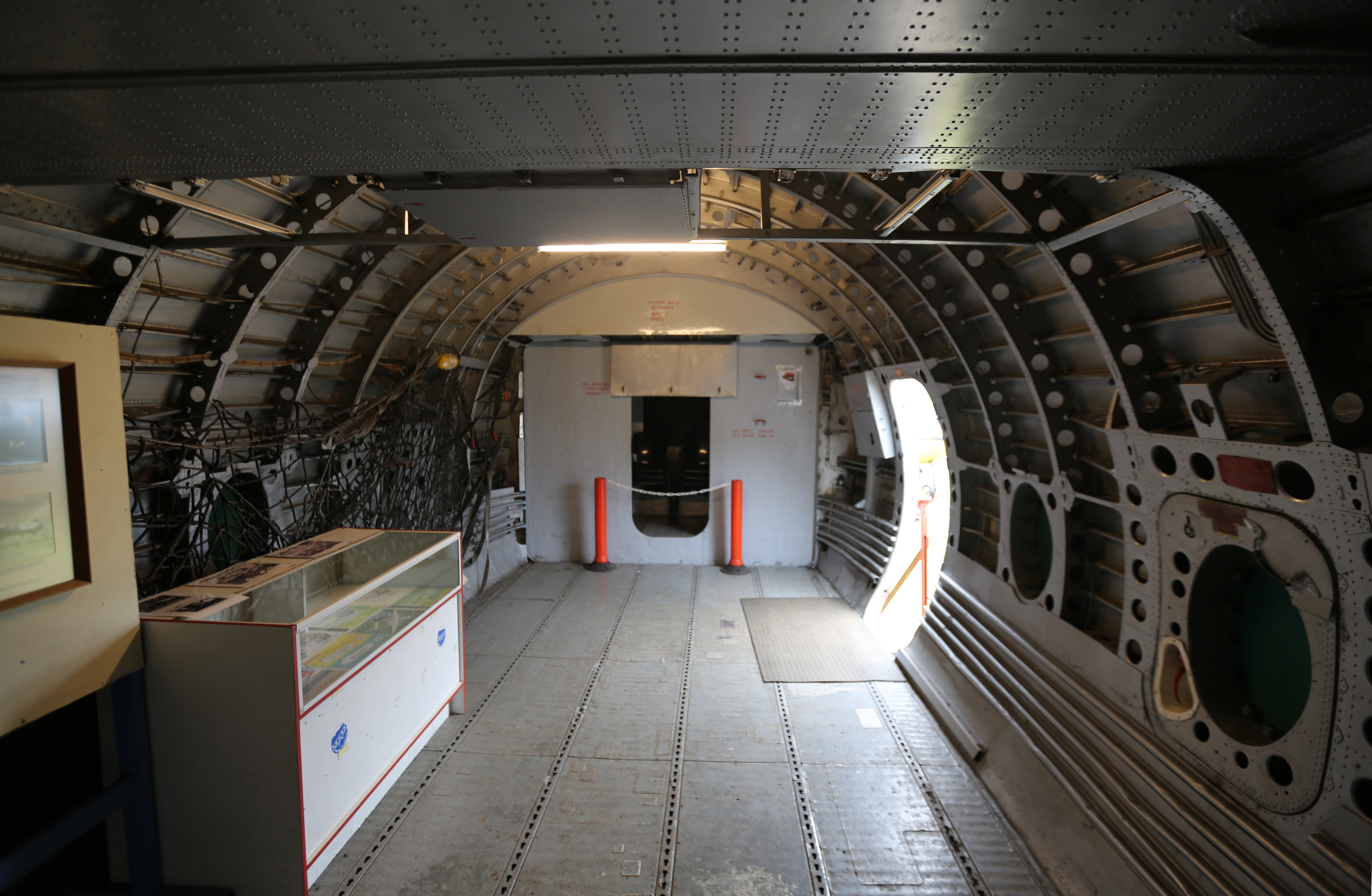
Internal view of the cargo bay

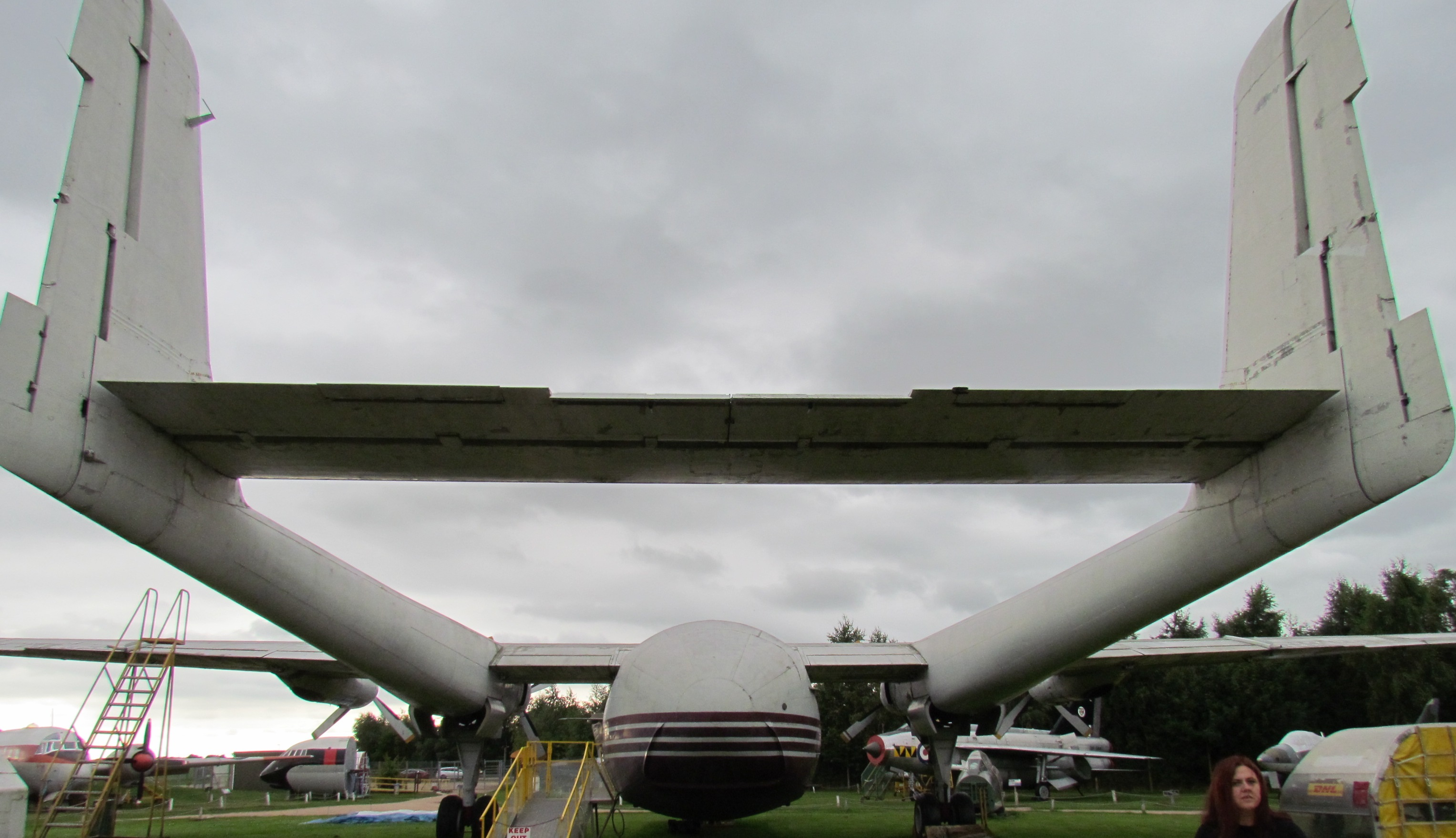
Rear view of the Argosy, note the twin-boom configuration

Data from Armstrong Whitworth Aircraft since 1913

General characteristics

- Crew: Four
- Capacity: up to 69 troops, 54 paratroops, 48 stretcher cases or 29,000 lb (13,000 kg) of cargo
- Length: 86 ft 9 in (26.44 m) (overall length)
- Fuselage length: 64 ft 7 in (19.69 m)
- Wingspan: 115 ft 0 in (35.05 m)
- Height: 29 ft 3 in (8.92 m)
- Wing area: 1,458 sq ft (135.5 m^{2})
- Empty weight: 56,000 lb (25,401 kg)
- Gross weight: 97,000 lb (43,998 kg)
- Max takeoff weight: 105,000 lb (47,627 kg)
- Fuel capacity: 4,140 imp gal (4,970 US gal; 18,800 L)
- Powerplant: 4 × Rolls-Royce Dart RDa.8 Mk 101 turboprops, 2,470 shp (1,840 kW) each (ehp)
- Propellers: 4-bladed Rotol

Performance

- Cruise speed: 253 mph (407 km/h, 220 kn)
- Range: 3,450 mi (5,550 km, 3,000 nmi)
- Service ceiling: 23,000 ft (7,000 m)

== See also ==
Aircraft of comparable role, configuration, and era

- Aviation Traders ATL-98 Carvair - a four-engined piston powered aircraft used for similar roles
- Bristol Freighter - with a similar high-set flight deck
- Fairchild C-82 Packet the original twin-engine piston-powered transport of pod-and-boom construction
- Fairchild C-119 Flying Boxcar - another twin-engined radial powered aircraft similar pod-and-boom construction
- Fairchild C-123 Provider a later piston-engined transport of similar size and conventional configuration
- Lockheed L-188 Electra - a similar but low-winged aircraft also used as a freighter

Related lists

- List of aircraft of the Royal Air Force
