= No. 114 Squadron RAF =

Defunct flying squadron of the Royal Air Force

No. 114 (Hong Kong) Squadron RAF
- Active: 27 Sep 1917 - 1 Apr 1920; 1 Dec 1936 – 1 Sep 1946; 1 Aug 1947 – 31 Dec 1957; 5 May 1959 – 29 Sep 1961; 30 Sep 1961 – 31 Oct 1971
- Country: United Kingdom
- Branch: Royal Air Force
- Nickname: Hong Kong
- Motto: "With speed I strike"

Insignia
- Squadron Heraldry: A Cobra head
- Squadron Codes: 114 (Mar 1937 - Apr 1939); FD (Apr 1939 - Sep 1939); RT Sep 1939 - Sep 1946)

No. 114 Squadron was a squadron of the British Royal Air Force. It was first formed in India during the First World War, serving as a light bomber squadron during the Second World War and as a transport squadron post-war. It was last disbanded in 1971.

== History ==
=== Formation and World War I ===
No. 114 Squadron Royal Flying Corps was formed at Lahore, India in September 1917, by splitting off part of No. 31 Squadron, becoming part of the Royal Air Force on 1 April 1918. Equipped with the B.E.2, the squadron carried out patrol operations over the North-West Frontier, flying from Quetta, with a detachment at RAF Khormaksar, Aden. The squadron partly re-equipped with Bristol Fighters in October 1919, but was disbanded on 1 April 1920, by renumbering the squadron to No. 28 Squadron.

=== Reformation and World War II ===
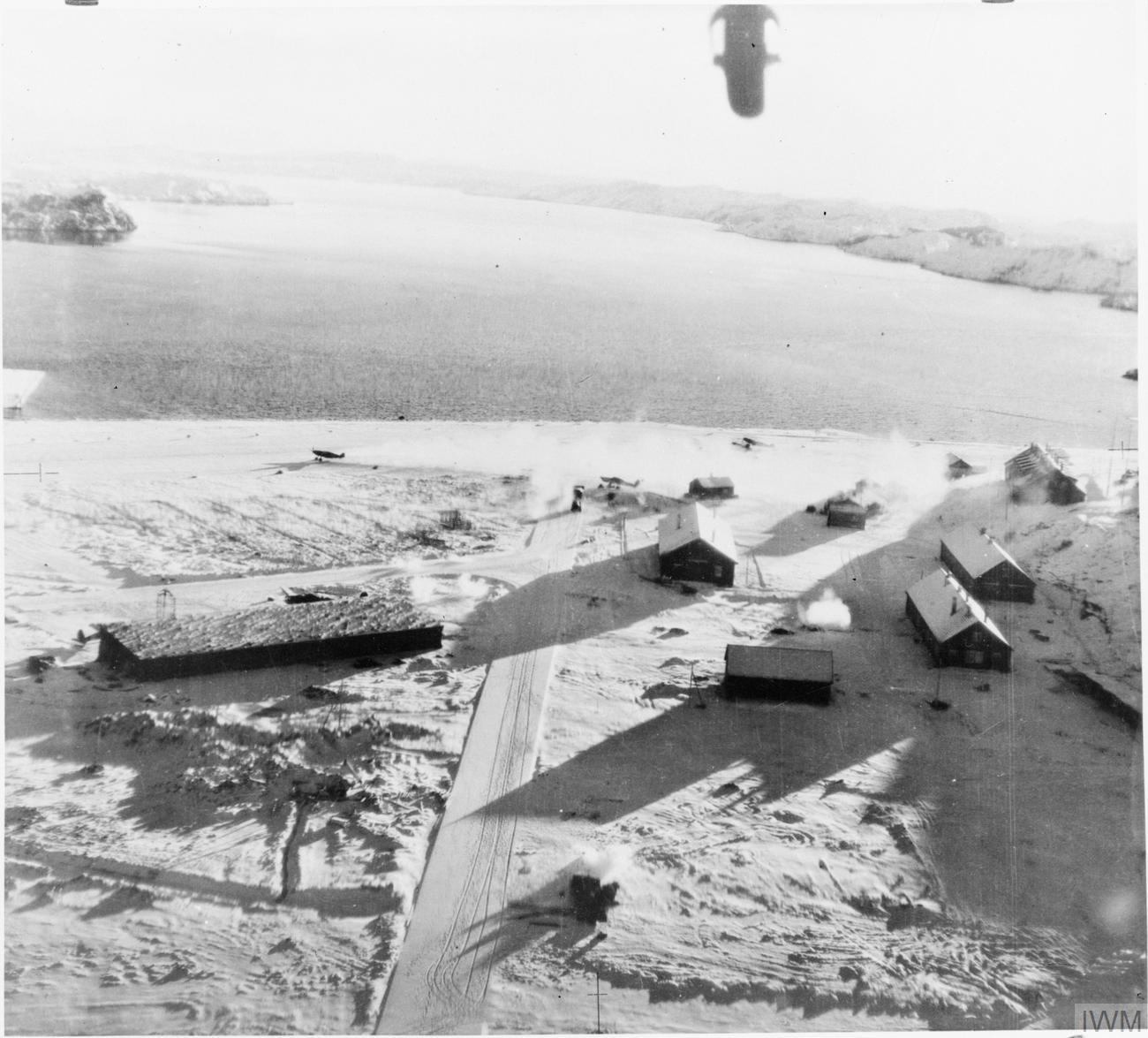
View from a 114 Squadron Blenheim bomber on a raid on Herdla, Norway.

The squadron reformed on 1 December 1936 at RAF Wyton, initially equipped with Hawker Hind single-engined biplane light bombers. It joined No. 2 Group of RAF Bomber Command on 1 March 1937, receiving more modern Bristol Blenheim I twin-engined monoplanes later that month, being the first RAF squadron to operate the Blenheim, while briefly operated a few Hawker Audaxes as trainers while converting to the Blenheim. The squadron received improved Blenheim IVs from April 1939, carrying out long-range navigation flights over France in July and participating in the annual home defence exercise in August 1939.

The squadron flew its first operations of the Second World War on 13 October 1939, when two aircraft, operating as a detachment from France, carried out reconnaissance flights over the Ruhr, one of the two Blenheims not returning. The squadron was allocated to join the Advanced Air Striking Force (AASF), moving to France in December 1939. On 10 May 1940, Germany invaded Belgium and the Netherlands, and on the next day, a German air attack against the 114 Squadron airfield at Vraux, destroyed six Blenheims, with the rest of aircraft being damaged. Although the squadron did fly a few bombing missions against the German advance, its losses meant it was soon evacuated to Britain, its remaining Blenheims (along with those of 139 Squadron) being used to reinforce the British Expeditionary Force Air Component reconnaissance squadrons.

The squadron rejoined 2 Group on 10 June 1940, attacking concentrations of barges in the German-held channel ports and Luftwaffe airfields by night. In March 1941, the squadron was loaned to RAF Coastal Command for convoy escort duties and patrols over the North Sea from RAF Thornaby in Yorkshire and RAF Leuchars in Fife, Scotland, returning to Bomber Command control at RAF West Raynham in July 1941. On 12 August 1941, the squadron took part in a big low-level attack by 2 Group Blenheims against two power stations at Knapsack and Quadrath near Cologne. 114 Squadron contributed 12 Blenheims against the Knapsack power station, losing one aircraft to anti-aircraft fire; 12 Blenheims were lost of the 54 sent on the raid. The squadron also took part in night intruder and bombing operations. On 11 February 1942, the German battleships Scharnhorst, Gneisenau and the heavy cruiser Prinz Eugen undertook the Channel Dash from Brest, France, heading up the English Channel to return to Germany. The German force was only spotted by the British when it was near Dover, prompting attempts by British sea and air forces to sink the German ships in Operation Fuller. Nine of 114 Squadron's Blenheims formed part of the 242 aircraft of Bomber Command that flew against the German force. While three of the squadron's aircraft sighted the German battleships and attacked, like the rest of the bombs and torpedoes expended against the German ships, missed, although both battleships were damaged by mines. The squadron continued on night attacks through March and April 1942 and on the night of 30/31 May, flew attacks against German night-fighter bases in support of Operation Millennium, the RAF's "1000 bomber" raid against Cologne. In August 1942, the squadron withdrew from its night intruder duties to convert to the newer Blenheim Mark V bomber (also known as the Bisley) in preparation for deployment in support of Operation Torch, the Anglo-American invasion of French North Africa.

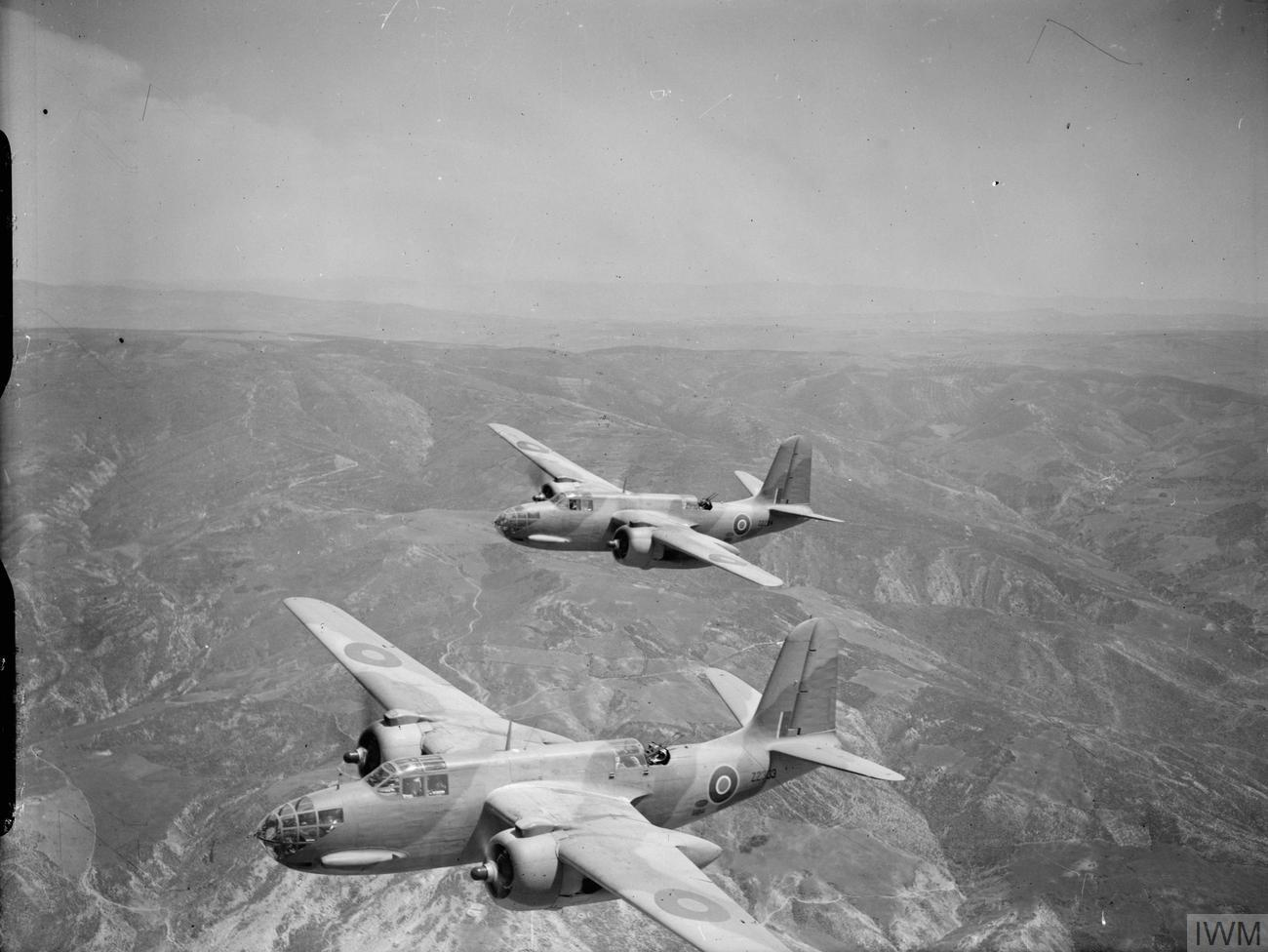
114 Squadron Bostons over North Africa

The squadron, part of 326 Wing, moved to Blida in Algeria in November 1942, to support the British First Army. The Bisley had poor performance, was vulnerable to fighter attack, and the squadron was therefore largely confined to night bombing. Bisley losses continued to be high, and in January 1943 the squadron relinquished its Bisleys to 614 Squadron, and waited for new aircraft, receiving more Bisleys in February and returning to operations. In March the squadron finally received more modern equipment, replacing its Bisleys with Douglas Boston light bombers, returning to operation with its new aircraft on 21 April. The squadron operated from Sicily and Italy, with its Bostons, that it retained until the end of the war when they were replaced with the De Havilland Mosquito.

=== Post War ===
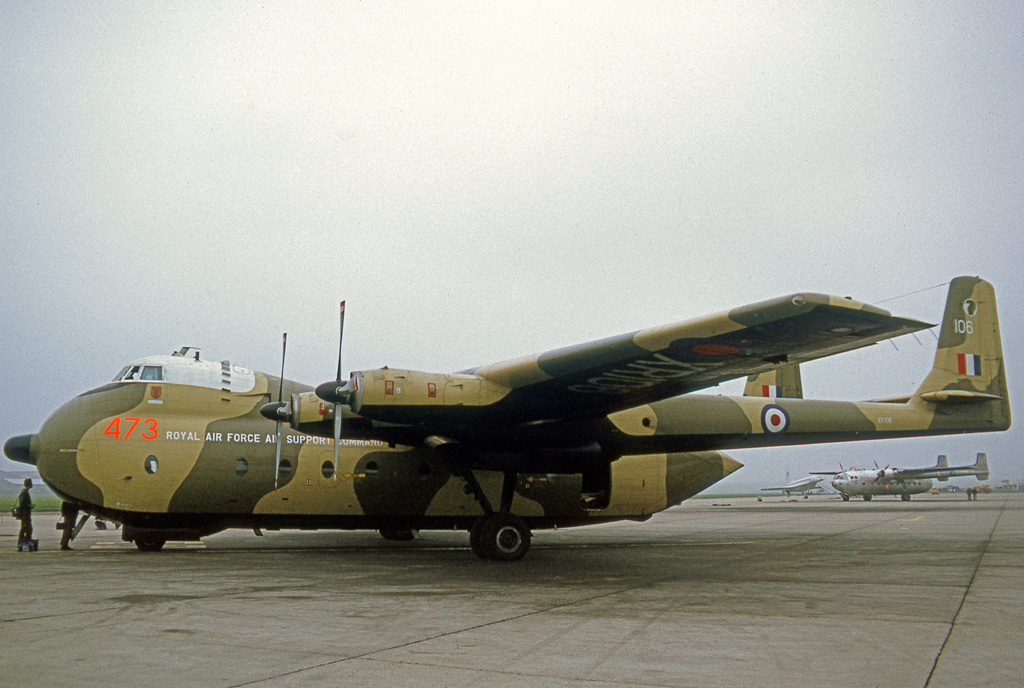
114 Squadron Armstrong Whitworth AW.660 Argosy in RAF Air Support Command markings in 1971

The squadron reformed in Egypt in 1947, and was located at RAF Kabrit. It was equipped with Dakota transport aircraft. It then operated Vickers Valettas and De Havilland Chipmunks. The squadron's final equipment was the Armstrong Whitworth AW.660 Argosy tactical transport aircraft, which was flown from their RAF Benson base from 1962 until 1971, when the squadron was finally disbanded.

== Aircraft operated ==
Aircraft operated by No. 114 Squadron RAF
From	To	Aircraft	Variant
Sep 1917	Oct 1919	B.E.2	
Oct 1919	Apr 1920	Bristol F2	b
Sep 1936	Feb 1937	Hawker Hind	Mk.I
Mar 1937	May 1939	Bristol Blenheim	Mk.I
May 1939	Mar 1943	Bristol Blenheim	Mk.IV
Apr 1943	Sep 1945	Douglas Boston	
Sep 1945	Sep 1946	De Havilland Mosquito	
Apr 1947	Aug 1949	Douglas DC3	Dakota
Apr 1947	Dec 1957	Vickers Valetta	C1
Dec 1958	Mar 1959	De Havilland Chipmunk	T10
May 1959	Sep 1961	Handley Page Hastings	
Oct 1961	Oct 1971	Armstrong Whitworth Argosy	

== Bibliography ==
- Bowyer, Michael J. F. (1974). 2 Group R.A.F.: A Complete History 1936–1945. London: Faber and Faber. ISBN 978-0-571-09491-2.
- Ellis, L. F. (1954). "Advance Into Belgium". The War in France and Flanders 1939-1940. History of the Second World War. London: HMSO.
- Halley, J. J. (1988). The Squadrons of the Royal Air Force & Commonwealth 1918-1988. Air-Britain (Historians) Limited. ISBN 0-85130-164-9.
- Mason, Francis K. (1994). The British Bomber since 1914. London: Putnam Aeronautical Books. ISBN 0-85177-861-5..
- Moyes, Philip J. R. (1964). Bomber Squadrons of the RAF and their Aircraft. London: Macdonald & Co.
- Pine, L. G. (1983). A dictionary of mottoes (First ed.). London: Routledge & Kegan Paul. ISBN 0-7100-9339-X.
- Rawlings, John D. R. (1982). Coastal, Support and Special Squadrons of the RAF and their Aircraft. London: Jane's Publishing Company. ISBN 0-7106-0187-5..
- Richards, Denis (1953). Royal Air Force 1939–1945: Volume I The Fight at Odds. History of the Second World War. London: HMSO.
- Richards, Denis (1994). The Hardest Victory: RAF Bomber Command in the Second World War. London: Coronet Books. ISBN 0-340-61720-9.
- Richards, Denis; Saunders, Hilary St. G. (1954). Royal Air Force 1939–1945: Volume II The Fight Avails. History of the Second World War. London: HMSO.
- Shores, Christopher; Massimello, Giovanni; Guest, Russell; Olynyk, Frank; Bock, Winfried (2016). A History of the Mediterranean Air War 1940–1945: Volume Three: Tunisia and the End in Africa: November 1942 – May 1943. London: Grub Street. ISBN 978-1-910690-00-0.
- Shores, Christopher; Massimello, Giovanni; Guest, Russell; Olynyk, Frank; Bock, Winfried; Thomas, Andy (2018). A History of the Mediterranean Air War 1940–1945: Volume Four: Sicily and Italy to the Fall of Rome: 14 May, 1943 – 5 June, 1944. London: Grub Street. ISBN 978-1-911621-10-2.
