= List of defunct airlines of the United States (D–I) =

The following is a list of defunct airlines of the United States. However, some of these airlines have ceased operations completely, changed identities and/or FAA certificates and are still operating under a different name (e.g. America West Airlines changed to use the identity of US Airways in 2005 – which itself also changed identity to American Airlines in 2015).

For reasons of size, this article is broken into four parts:

- List of defunct airlines of the United States (A–C)
- List of defunct airlines of the United States (D–I)
- List of defunct airlines of the United States (J–P)
- List of defunct airlines of the United States (Q–Z)

Airline	State or territory	Image	IATA	ICAO	Callsign	Hubs and focus cities	Commenced operations	Ceased operations	Notes
D
Dailey Aviation	North Carolina					Jacksonville	2000	2000	Charter operator
DAL Airlines	Texas					Killeen–Fort Hood	1966	1968	Merged into Hood Airlines
Dallas Express Airlines	Texas		EX	DXP	DALLAS EXPRESS	Dallas Love Field	1994	1995	Operated Beech 1300 Commuter
Danbury Airways	Connecticut					Danbury	1980	1981	
Dash Air	California		WI	IRV		Santa Ana	1981	1984	Established as Air Irvine
Data Air Courier	Ohio					Chicago Midway	1996	1996	Acquired by Airnet Express. Delivery of documents
Davis Air Lines	Georgia					Atlanta	1930	1930	Operated Travel Air aircraft
DayJet	Florida			DJS	DAYJET	Boca Raton	2002	2008	
Daylight Air	Ohio					Willow Run	1996	1998	
Daytona Aviation	Florida					Daytona Beach	1962	1966	Renamed Trans-Florida Airlines
DB Aviation	Illinois			NSH	NORTH SHORE	Waukegan	1987	2010	Acquired by Landmark Aviation
DC Aircraft	Michigan					Detroit	1967	1967	Commuter services
DeBoer Aviation	Kansas					Wichita	1973	1977	Original name of what later became Ryan Aviation, PHH Air and Ryan International
Decatur Commuter Airlines	Illinois			DAA	DECUR	Decatur	1980	1981	Acquired by Air Illinois
Del Airways	Georgia					Adel	1970	1971	
Delta Air Service	Alaska					Emmonak	1971	1993	Renamed to Grant Aviation
Delta Express	Georgia		DL	DAL	DELTA	Orlando	1996	2003	Replaced by Song; folded back into Delta Air Lines
Delta Private Jets	Kentucky			DPJ	JET CARD	Cincinnati	2001	2020	Merged with Wheels Up.
Des Moines Flying Service	Iowa					Des Moines	1960	1968	
Desert Commuter Airlines	California					Santa Monica	1968	1970	
Desert Sun Airlines	Arizona					Phoenix Sky Harbor	1995	1996	Merged to America West Express
Destination Sun Airways	Florida					Fort Lauderdale–Hollywood	1992	1993	
Detroit Northern Air Service	Michigan					Alpena County	1950	1975	Known as Alpena Flying Service
Detroit – Grand Rapids Airline	Michigan					Dearborn	1926	1926	Operated Stout 2-AT Pullman
Devoe Airlines	Georgia					Miami	1981	1983	
DHL Airways, Inc. (1979–2004)	Florida						1979	2004	Renamed Astar Air Cargo
DHL Airways	Kentucky		ER	DHL			1983	2003	Rebranded as Astar Air Cargo
Diamond Aviation				SPK	SPARKLE		1984	1985	
Direct Air	Illinois		UO	XAP	AIR DIRECT	Chicago Gary	1980	1994	Reorganized as Northern Star Airlines
Direct Air	South Carolina					Myrtle Beach	2006	2012	
Direct Airlines						New York Kennedy	1969	1969	
Discover Air	Florida			DCV	DISCOVER	Orlando Sanford	1999	2003	
Discovery Airlines	New Jersey					Trenton–Mercer	1996	2000	Formed as Sky Trek International Air Lines
Discovery Airways	Hawaii		DH	DVA	DISCOVERY AIRWAYS	Honolulu	1990	1990	
Dixie Aircharter	Florida					Miami	1982	1983	
Dixie Airlines	Utah					St. George	1969	1972	Renamed to SkyWest Airlines
Dixie Flying Service	Virginia					Charlottesville–Albemarle	1930	1932	Renamed to Ludington Air Lines
Dolphin Airways	Florida		DV		FLAGSHIP	Tampa	1981	1984	Acquired by Provincetown-Boston Airline
Dolphin Express Airlines	Florida		8U	IXX	ISLAND EXPRESS	Saint Croix	1994	2000	
Dorado Wings	Puerto Rico						1964	1982	To Crown Air
Doug Geeting Aviation	Alaska					Talkeetna	1990s	2006	Merged into K2 Aviation
Dovair	Delaware					Delaware Airpark	1976	1977	Briefly operated as Baltimore Airways
Dovair Air Transport	Delaware					Delaware Airpark	1967	1969	Air taxi flights
Dove One	Florida					Fort Lauderdale–Hollywood	1990	1999	Air taxi operator
Downeast Airlines	Maine					Knox County	1960	2007	Commuter airline
Downeast Express	Maine		E7	DOW	DOWNEAST EXPRESS	Portland	1995	1997	Renamed Northeast Airlines
Downtown Airlines	New York					New York Skyports Seaplane Base	1972	1975	Hourly service operated with float-equipped Piper Aztec
Drummond Island Air	Michigan			DRE	MICHIGAN	Drummond Island	1989	1991	Established as Michigan Airways
Dwyer Flying Service	Iowa						1957	-	Founded by Jerry Dwyer, operated until his retirement
Dynamic International Airways	Pennsylvania		2D	DYA	DYNAMIC AIR	Wayne	2015	2018	Established as Dynamic Airways
E
Eagle Air International	Nevada		V9	VIK		Las Vegas McCarran	1969	1993	Rebranded as Eagle Airlines
Eagle Airline	Alabama					Auburn	1985	1986	Operated Piper Navajo
Eagle Airlines	Kansas					Kansas City Wheeler	1930	1930	Scheduled passenger service
Eagle Airlines	Nevada		V9	VIK		Las Vegas McCarran	1993	1997	Began as Eagle Air International
Eagle Canyon Airlines	Nevada		FE	TLO	TALON	Las Vegas McCarran	1969	1998	Merged into Scenic Airlines
Eagle Commuter Airlines	Texas			ECA	EAGLEAIR	Brownwood	1976	1986	
Eagle Jet Charter	Nevada					Las Vegas McCarran	1996	1998	Grand Canyon tours
Eagle Wings (airline)									
East Coast Commuter	Massachusetts					Boston	1963	1970	
East Hampton Aire	New York		IN	EHA	AIR HAMPTON	East Hampton	1978	1991	Operated subservices for Pilgrim Airlines
East Texas Airlines	Texas					Longview	1950s		
Eastern Air Lines	New York; Florida		EA	EAL	EASTERN	Miami	1926	1991	Established as Pitcairn Aviation
Eastern Air Lines (2015)	Florida					Miami	2015	2017	Operated Boeing 737
Eastern Air Lines Shuttle	Virginia					New York-LaGuardia	1961	1989	To Trump Shuttle
Eastern Metro Express	Georgia			EME	EMAIR	Atlanta	1984	1991	
Eastman Airways	New York					Albany	1983	1984	Renamed to Air Marc
Eastwind Airlines	New Jersey		W9	SGR	STINGER	Trenton, New Jersey	1995	1999	
Economy Airways								1956	Irregular air carrier grounded by CAB for financial weakness
Ed's Aircraft Service	Oklahoma						1972	1973	
Edde Airlines	Utah					Salt Lake City	1960	1965	
Ede-Aire	Michigan		DV			Detroit Lakes	1978	1981	Acquired by Mesaba Airlines
El Paso Transport	Texas					Big Spring McMahon	1975	1975	Renamed to Trans Regional Airlines
Elan Air	Massachusetts					Boston	1980	1982	
Elite Airways	Maine		7Q	MNU	MAINER	Portland, MaineVero Beach, Florida	2014	2022	
Ellis Airlines	Alaska					Ketchikan	1936	1962	To Alaska Coastal Airlines
Emerald Air	Texas		OD	EFF	EMERALD	Austin Bergstrom	1978	1991	Established as Emerald Valley Airlines. To Braniff International Airlines, Inc.
Emery Worldwide Airlines	Ohio		EB	EWW	EMERY	Dayton	1989	2001	renamed from Air Train in 1989
Empire Air Lines	Idaho					Spokane	1946	1952	Purchased by West Coast Airlines
Empire Airlines	New York			UR		Oneida County	1976	1986	To Piedmont Airlines
Empire Airways	New York			JKR	JOKER	Farmingdale	2004	2012	
Empire State Airlines	New York					Syracuse	1964	1966	Third level carrier
Encompass Aviation	California		LC	ROM		Hawthorne Jack Northrop	2017	2019	Passenger charter carrier
Enterprise Airlines	Ohio			JSP	JETSPEED	Cincinnati/Northern Kentucky	1988	1990	Regional carrier connections to the Concorde
Eos Airlines	New York		E0	ESS	NEW DAWN	New York Kennedy	2004	2009	
Era Aviation	Alaska		7H	ERH	ERAH	Anchorage	1948	2009	Formed as Economy Helicopters, acquired by Frontier Alaska, renamed to Era Alaska now Ravn Alaska
Essair	Texas					Houston-Hobby	1939	1946	Renamed to Pioneer Air Lines. Legal name of the carrier was Essair, Inc.
Eugene Aviation Services	Oregon					Eugene	1956	1969	Operated on behalf of West Coast Airlines
Eureka Aero	California					Samoa Field	1970	1979	Renamed Air Pacific (United States)
Evergreen International Airlines	Oregon		EZ	EIA	EVERGREEN	New York Kennedy	1975	2013	See also Evergreen International Aviation
Evergreen International Aviation	Oregon						1960	2014	Formed as Evergreen Helicopters, see also Evergreen International Airlines and Intermountain Aviation
Exec Air	New York					Sullivan County	1996	1999	Renamed to Exec Air of Naples
Exec Express	Texas					Dallas/Fort Worth	1984	1998	See Lone Star Airlines
Excellaire	Colorado		BH	AUS		Stapleton	1974	1985	Established as US Aviation. Changed to AIR US in 1977. Became Execellaire in 1984.
Execuair	Washington					Seattle-Tacoma	1971	1977	Renamed to Columbia Pacific Airlines
Executive Air Transport	Michigan					Muskegon	1995	1995	Executive charter and cargo carrier
Executive Airlines	Florida						1964	1971	
Executive Airlines	Massachusetts		EX			Boston	1967	1973	Established as National Executive Flight Service
Executive Airlines	Massachusetts					Hanscom Field	1976	1977	Established as Air Speed
Executive Airlines	Puerto Rico		OW	EGF	EAGLE FLIGHT	San Juan	1986	2013	Began as Executive Air Charter
Executive Airlines	New York		YL	ORA		Farmingdale	1991	2003	Began as Long Island Airlines
Executive Airshare	Missouri			XSR		Kansas City Wheeler	1974	2018	Rebranded Airshare
Executive Charter Service	Alaska					Bethel	1983	1985	Acquired by Unalakleet Air Taxi
Executive Flight Services	Oregon					Portland	1961	1977	Renamed to Air Oregon
Executive Jet Aviation	Ohio					Columbus Glenn	1977	1978	Merged with Newport Aero to form EJA/Newport
Executive Jet Aviation	New Jersey		EJ	EJA	EXECJET	Teterboro	1965	2007	Established as Executive Jet Airways
Executive Yankee Airlines	Massachusetts					Pittsfield	1968	1969	Established as Yankee Airlines
Express Air	Arizona			AAE	ARIZONA	Phoenix Sky Harbor	1997	2001	
Express Airlines I	Tennessee		9E	FLG	FLAGSHIP	Memphis	1995	2002	Renamed to Pinnacle Airlines
ExpressJet	Georgia		EV	ASQ	ACEY		1986	2022	Commenced flights in 1987. Ceased flights in 2020 and briefly relaunched as aha! before liquidating in 2022.
Express One International	Texas		EO	LHN	LONGHORN	Dallas/Fort Worth	1995	2002	Renamed to Pinnacle Airlines then Endeavor Air
Express.Net Airlines	Florida			XNA	EXPRESSNET	Naples	2000	2008	Formed as Trans Continental Airlines
F
Fairbanks Air Service	Alaska			FAS	FAIRBANKS	Fairbanks	1946	1975	to Great Northern Airlines
Fairbanks Airplane Company	Alaska					Fairbanks	1925	1926	Operated Fokker F.III. Absorbed into Wien Alaska Airways
Fairways Corp.	Virginia			FWY		Washington National	1969	1989	Intrastate carrier
Falcon Air Express	Florida		F2	FAO	PANTHER	Miani	1995	2015	
Falcon Airways	Texas					Addison	1971	1979	Operated Carvair
Family Airlines	Nevada					Las Vegas McCarran	1992	1992	Never started operations
FAR Airlines	New York					New York Kennedy	1968	1968	
Farthest North Airplane Company	Alaska					Fairbanks	1923	1924	Ben Eielson first flight on a Curtiss Jenny JN-4D took place on 3 July 1923
Far West Airlines	California			FRW		Fresno Yosemite	1984	1984	Operated two leased NAMC YS-11
Farwest Airlines	Arizona					Phoenix Sky Harbor	1999	2004	Operated DHC Dash 7
Federated Airlines	New York					New York-LaGuardia	1948	1952	Irregular air carrier.
Ferguson Airways	Alaska					Anchorage	1949	1949	Acquired by Wien Alaska Airlines
Ferns Flying Service	New Hampshire					Concord	1969	1969	Daily commuter service between Concord and Boston
Fiesta-Air	California			FEA	FIESTA	Long Beach	1971	1973	A dba of Prairie Avenue Gospel Center. Commercial air carrier, operated L-188s and Martin 4-0-4s.
Fina Air	Puerto Rico					San Juan	2003		
Finair Express	Florida			FNX	FINEX	Miami	1982	1984	Subcontract carrier for Air Florida Commuter then renamed to Southern Express
Financial Air Express	Michigan					Pontiac	1974	1974	Founded by Gerald Mercer
Fine Air	Florida		FB	FBF	FINE AIR	Miami	1989	2002	To Arrow Air
First Air	California					Los Angeles	1982	1983	Renamed to Regentair. All-first class service
Fischer Brothers Aviation	Ohio		GP	GCS	GALION	Galion	1989	2001	Established as Galion Commuter Service. Became an Allegheny Commuter. Acquired by Midway Airlines and renamed to Midway Commuter
Five Star Airlines	Massachusetts			FIV	FIVE STAR		1985	1989	Operated L-1011 TriStar
Flagship Airlines	Tennessee					Nashville	1991	1998	Formed by the merger of Command Airways into Nashville Eagle, merged with Simmons Airlines and Wings West Airlines to form American Eagle Airlines
Flagship Express Services	Illinois; Michigan			FSX	FLAG	Willow Run Airport	1991	1991	Previously Rosenbalm Aviation, briefly flew own-brand cargo service
Fleet Airways	Minnesota					Duluth	1967	1968	Renamed to Fleet Airlines
Fleetway Airlines	Texas					Austin Mueller	1967	1969	
Fleming International Airways	Florida			FLM	FLEMING	Fort Lauderdale	1973	1983	Originally a "commercial operator." Became CAM Air International
Flight Alaska	Alaska		4Y	UYA		Bethel	2000	2004	Established as Yute Air Alaska. Renamed to Yute Air
Flight Express				EXR	FLIGHT EXPRESS		1985	2013	Established as Chapman Air
Flight International Airlines	Georgia			FIV	FLIGHT INTERNATIONAL	Atlanta	1984	1987	
Flight Line	Missouri			FLN	FAST LINE	Cape Girardeau	1985	1986	Renamed to Southern Airways
Flight Operations	Ohio			FOI		Cleveland Hopkins	1979	1979	Charter carrier. Acquired by Crow Executive Air
Flight Options	New York			OPT	OPTIONS	Greater Binghamton	1999	1999	
Flight Service	New York					Syracuse	1953	1964	Third level carrier
Flightways Aviation System	Pennsylvania					Philadelphia	1974	1975	Commuter services
Florence Airlines	South Carolina					Florence	1974	1975	Established as Air Taxi
Florida Air Lines	Florida					Sarasota-Bradenton	1969	1981	Established as Florida Air Taxi. Became Southern International Airways. Operated DC-3, Cessna 402
Florida Air Taxi	Florida					Tampa	1964	1968	Renamed to Florida Airlines
Florida Aircraft Leasing	Florida								
Florida Airlines	Florida		FE			Tampa	1960	1981	
Florida Airmotive	Florida					Lantana	1940	1940	Charter carrier
Florida Airways	Florida					Miami	1923	1927	
Florida Airways	Florida					Orlando	1947	1949	local service airline, originally Orlando Airlines
Florida Atlantic Airlines	Florida					Fort Lauderdale	1968	1970	
Florida Coastal Airlines	Florida		PA	FCL	FLORIDA COASTAL	Fort Lauderdale-Hollywood	1995	2010	
Florida Commuter Airlines	Florida			FCA		Palm Beach	1980	1981	To Southern Airways
Florida Express	Florida		ZO	FLX	FLEXAIR	Orlando	1983	1988	Merged into Braniff (1983–1990)
Florida West Airlines	Florida		HG	FWL	FLO WEST	Miami	1989	1995	Acquired by Florida West International Airways
Florida West International Airways	Florida		RF	FWL	FLO WEST	Miami	1981	2017	
FloridaGulf Airlines	Florida					Tampa	1991	1997	Merged into Air Midwest
Fly First Class			F3	SGB	SONGBIRD		2008	2008	
Fly Guam	Guam					Guam	2008	2012	
FlyHawaii Airlines	Hawaii					Honolulu	2005	2005	Never started operations
Flying Fox Services							1929	1929	Acquired by Delta Air Service
Flying Tiger Air Services						Tokyo Narita	1966	1967	Branch of Flying Tiger Lines. Contract to Military Airlift Command
Flying Tiger Line	California		FT	FTL	TIGER	Los Angeles	1945	1989	Merged into FedEx Express
Flying W Airways	New Jersey					Medford, New Jersey	1967	1972	uncertificated carrier
Focus Air Cargo	Florida		F2	FKS	FOCUS	Fort Lauderdale	2004	2008	
Folsom's Air Service	Maine					Greenville	1989	2006	Charter carrier
Fontana Aviation	Michigan					Iron Mountain	1967	1977	Third-level services
Ford Air Transport Service	Illinois					Detroit	1925	1932	Merged with Stout Air Service
Forde-Aire				SQH	SUSQUEHANNA		1978	1979	Renamed to Susquehanna Airways
Fort Collins Flying Service	Colorado					Denver	1980	1981	Established as Valley Airpark. Acquired by Air Link Corporation
Fort Vancouver Airlines	Washington					Vancouver	1979	1981	Commuter carrier. PATCO strike caused the closing.
Fort Wayne Air Service	Indiana					Fort Wayne	1963	1967	Scheduled air taxi services to Detroit
Fort Worth Airlines	Texas			FTW	FORT WORTH AIR	Fort Worth Meacham	1984	1985	Went bankrupt
Foster Aviation	Alaska			FSA	FOSTER-AIR	Nome	1973	1984	Was an FBO operator by Neal Foster
Four Star Air Cargo	Puerto Rico		HK	FSC	FOUR STAR	San Juan	1982	2009	Started in the United States Virgin Islands
Fox Cities Airlines	Wisconsin						1963	1965	Operated de Havilland Dove. Merged into Air Wisconsin
Frank Martz Coach Co.	New York					Buffalo Niagara	1929	1930	Renamed to Martz Air Lines
Freedom Airlines	Ohio		DN		LIBERTY	Cleveland Hopkins	1980	1984	Subsidiary of Red Dodge Aviation
Freedom Airlines	Texas		F8	FRL	FREEDOM AIR	Cincinnati/Northern Kentucky	2002	2010	Shut down by parent company
Freelandia						Newark Liberty	1973	1974	
Friedkin Airlines	California					San Diego	1948	1948	
Friendship Air Alaska	Alaska		4H	FAL	FRIENDSHIP	Fairbanks	1986	1989	Established as Harold's Air Service. Resumed as Tanana Air Service in 1992
Fromhagen Aviation	Florida					St. Pete-Clearwater	1969	1998	
Frontier Airlines	Colorado		FL	FTA	FRONTIER	Denver	1950	1986	Went bankrupt; some operations absorbed by Continental Airlines
Frontier Alaska	Alaska					Anchorage	2008	2014	
Frontier Express	Wisconsin					Milwaukee Mitchell	2011	2013	Operated by Chautauqua Airlines
Frontier Flying Service	Alaska					Fairbanks	1950	2014	
Frontier Horizon Airlines	Colorado		FL	FLH	MILE HIGH	Denver Stapleton	1983	1986	
Funair	Florida					Miami	1996	2001	Operated for Carnival Cruise Lines
Funworld International Airways	Florida					Miami	1993	1994	Operated Boeing 727-200
Futura Air Lines	California					Oakland	1962	1962	
G
Galaxy Airlines	Tennessee					Cleveland Hopkins	1968	1969	Commuter services. Operated Douglas DC-3
Galaxy Airlines	Florida		9G	GAL	GALAXY	Fort Lauderdale	1978	1987	
Galena Air Service	Alaska			GAS	GALENA AIR SERVICE	Galena	1968	1989	Acquired by MarkAir Express
Gateway Aviation	Wisconsin					La Crosse	1968	1969	Renamed to Mississippi Valley Airways
Gem State Airlines	Idaho		GS			Coeur d'Alene	1978	1980	Merged with Air Pacific (United States) to become Golden Gate Airlines
Gemini Air Cargo	Minnesota		GR	GCO	GEMINI	Miami	1995	2008	
General Air Lines						San Diego	1934	1934	Renamed to Western Air Express
General Airlines	Pennsylvania						1978	1979	Established as General Aviation Service
General Aviation	Tennessee			GNL	GENERAL		1979	1988	Affiliate of Orion Air, became Kitty Hawk Air Cargo
Genavco Air Cargo	Hawaii						1972	2003	to Kamaka Air
Geo Air	Florida						1995	2008	
Georgia Air	Georgia					Atlanta	1970	1972	
Georgia Air Freight	Georgia		GS			Atlanta	1978	1979	
Georgia Skies	Georgia		LI	NMI	TSUNAMI	Atlanta	2008	2013	A Pacific Wings subsidiary
GID Air Services	Texas					Fort Worth Meacham	1982	1986	Operated CV-580
Gillam Airways	Alaska					Valdez	1932	1932	
Gilley Airways	New York					Glens Falls	1961	1979	All-cargo commuter
Gilpin Air Lines	California					Los Angeles	1931	1934	Renamed to C&G Air Lines
GLO Airlines	Louisiana					New Orleans	2015	2017	
Global International Airways	Missouri		GX	GAX	GLOBAL	Kansas City	1978	1985	Former commercial operator started to transport cattle
Globe Air	Arizona					New Orleans	1981	1985	Operating name of Aircraft Specialities of Mesa Airlines
Globe Freight Airline							1945	1948	
go!	Hawaii		YV	ASH	AIR SHUTTLE	Honolulu	2006	2014	
Go! Mokulele	Hawaii					Honolulu	2009	2012	
Go Transportation							1971	1977	Established as Ron Clark Enterprises. Renamed to Go Air
Gold Coast Air	California			GMR	EXPEDITOR	Los Angeles	1981	1982	
Gold Coast Air Taxi	Florida					Miami	1966	1967	Renamed to Gold Coast Airways
Gold Coast Airways	Florida					Miami	1967	1969	Acquired by Executive Airlines
Golden Airlines				GDD	GOLDEN AIRLINES		1999	1999	
Golden Airways							1980	1983	Established as Ancar Aviation
Golden Carriage Air							1979	1980	
Golden Eagle Airlines				GEL	GOLDEN EAGLE		1978	1979	Absorbed by WestAir Airlines
Golden Gate Airlines	California		GG			Monterey	1980	1981	Merged with Swift Aire Lines
Golden Gate Airways	California					San Francisco	1960	1962	
Golden Isles Airlines	Georgia					McKinnon St. Simons Island	1960	1960	Operated de Havilland Dove
Golden North Airways	Alaska						1947	1949	Operated C-46
Golden Nugget Aviation							1982	2001	
Golden Pacific Airlines	California					San Francisco	1969	1973	
Golden Pacific Airlines	Arizona		YB	GPA	GOLD PAC	Kingman	1981	1989	
Golden South Airlines	Florida					Fort Pierce	1979	1979	
Golden State Airlines	California					Burbank	1951	1952	California intrastate airline
Golden State Airlines	California						1955	1987	
Golden State Airlines	Arizona			GSC	GOLDEN STATE	Santa Ana	1979	1985	
Golden Valley Aero							1982	1982	
Golden West Airlines	California		GW	GWA	GOLDEN WEST	Long Beach	1967	1983	
Golden West Airlines	California					Van Nuys	1968	1969	
Gopher Airlines							1968	1968	
Gopher Aviation							1959	1959	
Gordon Air							1984	2000	Founded by John Gordon. Renamed to Ultimate Jetcharters
Gorst Air Transport	Washington					Seattle Lake Union Seaplane Base	1929	1935	Founded by Vern C. Gorst
GP Express Airlines	Nebraska			GPE	REGIONAL EXPRESS	Grand Island	1975	1996	
Graham Airways	Alaska						1932	1935	
Grand Aire Express	Ohio			GAE	GRAND EXPRESS	Toledo Express	1985	2003	
Grand Airways	Nevada		QD	GNV	GRAND VEGAS	Las Vegas McCarran	1980	1996	
Grand Forks Airmotive	North Dakota					Grand Forks	1975	1975	Scheduled airmail carrier
Grand Valley Aviation	Idaho					Driggs–Reed	1992	1995	Charters and scenic flights
Gray Line Air	New York		WS	WSA		Niagara Falls	1994	1995	
Great American Airways	Nevada		MV	GRA	GREAT AMERICAN	Reno–Tahoe	1979	1997	
Great Arctic Airways	Alaska					Fairbanks	1996	1996	Operated ATL-98 Carvair
Great Lakes Airlines	California					Burbank	1946	1961	Supplemental air carrier, shut down in 1961 by CAB for combine activity
Great Lakes Airlines	Wyoming		ZK	GLA	LAKES AIR	Cheyenne	1979	2018	Formerly Spirit Lake Airways
Great Lakes Commuter	Michigan					Traverse City	1972	1974	Acquired by Skystream Airlines
Great Northern Airlines	Alaska		OU	GNA	GREAT NORTHERN	Anchorage	1975	1980	Established as Fairbanks Air Service as an intrastate airline. Merged into Alaska International Air.
Great Plains Airlines			ZN				1977	1979	Established as Trinity Airlines
Great Plains Airlines	Oklahoma		ZO	OZR	OZARK	Oklahoma City Rogers	2001	2004	
Great Planes Express	Kansas					Augusta	1995	1995	
Great Sierra Airlines	California					Lake Tahoe	1980	1981	
Great Southern Airways	Florida					Miami	1988	1989	Cargo carrier
Great Western Air				GWA	G-W AIR		1994	1994	
Great Western Airlines	Oklahoma		DQ	GWS	GREAT WESTERN		1975	1979	Scheduled mail and freight services operating Beech 18
Great Western Aviation	South Dakota					Sioux Fall	1990	1990	Operated Cessna P210R
Greater Pacific Airways	California					Los Angeles	1982	1988	Operated Embraer Bandeirante. Renamed to Air LA
Greatland Air Cargo	Alaska					Anchorage	1995	2001	Operated DHC-4 Caribou
Green Bay Aviation	Wisconsin		HE	GBA		Green Bay–Austin Straubel	1965	1981	
Green Hills Aviation				GRH	GREEN HILLS		1978	1987	
Green Mountain Airlines	New York					New York-LaGuardia	1979	1980	Operated Cessna 402
Greenbriar Airlines	West Virginia					Greenbrier	1939	1969	Commuter carrier. Operated Cessna 172
Grey Goose Air Lines	Illinois					Chicago Midway	1928	1929	Sightseeing service. Operated Ford Trimotor
Grognet Flying Service	Michigan					Houghton	1973	1975	Summer schedule service to Isle Royale
Gross Aviation	Washington					Tacoma Narrows	1972	1974	Air taxi operator
Gulf Air International	Florida					Arcadia	1979	1989	Renamed to Trans Ocean Airways
Gulf Air Transport	Louisiana		QG	GAT	GULFTRANS	New Iberia	1979	1989	Renamed to Trans Ocean Airways
Gulf and Caribbean Cargo			8G	TSU			2004	2009	
Gulf Central Airlines	Florida		BJ	GCN	GULF CENTRAL	Melbourne Orlando	1981	1984	Established as Devoe Airlines
Gulf Coast Airlines	Mississippi			GFC	GULF COAST	Gulfport	1971	1975	Renamed to Coastal Airways
Gulfstream Airlines				GFS	GULFSTAR		1971	1975	
Gulfstream International Airlines	Florida		3M	GFT	GULF FLIGHT	Fort Lauderdale–Hollywood	1990	2010	Now Silver Airways
Gulkana Air Service	Alaska					Gulkana	1963	1997	Operated Cessna 185 Skywagon, Cessna 206, Cessna 402
Gull Air	Massachusetts		JI			Hyannis	1975	1987	Founded by Robert Welch
Gull Air	Florida			GUL	GULL-AIR	Miami	1982	1987	Was an Air Florida Commuter
Guy-America Airways	New York		GK	GAM	GUY AMERICA	New York Kennedy	1981	1984	See also American Overseas Airlines
H
H & D Aviation	Indiana					Terre Haute	1980	1981	Renamed to Terre Haute Air Commuter
Hageland Aviation Services	Alaska		H6	HAG	HAGELAND	Anchorage	1981	2008	Merged with Frontier Alaska
Hagerty's Air Transportation	North Carolina					Charlotte	1984	1984	Merged into Sunbird Airlines
Haines Airways	Alaska		7A			Haines	1986	2000	Founded by Reg Radcliffe. Operated Piper PA-32
Hammonds Air Service	Louisiana					Houma–Terrebonne	1977	1985	Operated Piper Navajo, Twin Otter
Hampton Air Service	New York					East Hampton	1936	1937	Operated Stinson Reliant
Hanford Airlines	Iowa					Sioux City	1937	1937	Established as Hanford Tri-State Airlines
Happy Hours Air Travel Club	Florida					Miami	1973	1973	Air travel club founded by James Ruscoe. Operated Lockheed L-1049 Super Constellation
Harbor Airlines	Washington		HB	HAR	HARBOR	Seattle–Tacoma	1971	2001	
Harold's Air Service	Alaska			HAS	HAROLDS	Fairbanks	1974	1986	Renamed to Friendship Air Alaska
Harrisburg Commuter	Pennsylvania					Harrisburg	1965	1970	Renamed to Pennsylvania Commuter Airlines
Hartford Airlines	Connecticut					Robertson Field	1966	1966	Operated Aero Commander 500
Hartzog Schneck Aviation	Illinois					Chicago Rockford	1966	1969	Operated Beechcraft King Air
HATS Hawaiian Air Tour Service	Hawaii					Honolulu	1946	1950	Operated Beechcraft D-18
HATS Hawaiian Air Tour Service	Hawaii			RES	RESORT	Honolulu	1953	1979	Absorbed Resort Airways in 1967. Operated de Havilland Dove
Havasu Airlines	Arizona		HW	HCA	HAVASU	Lake Havasu City	1963	1987	Subsidiary of Nicholson Air Service and Cumberland Airlines
Hawaii Express	Hawaii					Honolulu	1982	1984	
Hawaii Island Hoppers	Hawaii					Honolulu	1992	1992	Scenic tours
Hawaii Jet-Aire	Hawaii					Honolulu	1968	1968	Third level services. Operated Twin Otter
Hawaii Pacific Air	Hawaii					Honolulu	1973	1995	Operated Carvair
Hawaiian Airventures	Hawaii					Keahole	1992	1992	Scenic tours
Hawaiian Pacific Airlines	Hawaii		HP			Los Angeles	1992	1992	Established as Alii Air Hawaii
Hawkeye Airlines	Iowa					Ottumwa	1974	1974	Operated DC-3
Hawkaire	North Carolina			HKI	HAWKEYE	Charlotte Douglas	1991	2009	
Hawkins and Powers Aviation	Wyoming					Greybull	1989	2006	Aerial firefighting. Operated Consolidated PB4Y-2 Privateer and Fairchild C-119 Flying Boxcar
Hawthorne Nevada Airlines	California					Hawthorne	1963	1970	Renamed to Air Nevada
Heartland Airlines	Ohio					Dayton	1998	2001	Never started operations
Helicopter Air Service	Delaware						1949	1956	Renamed to Chicago Helicopter Airways
Hemet Valley Flying Services	California					Hemet-Ryan	1946	1997	Aerial firefighting. Operated Boeing KC-97L, PBY Catalina, C-119C
Hemisphere Air Transport							1950	1957	A member carrier of North American Airlines
Henry's Charter Air Service	Kansas					Concordia	1965	1968	Operated Cessna 337 and Cessna 210
Hensley Flying Service	Montana					Havre	1944	1978	
Henson Airlines	Maryland		PI	HNA		Charlotte Douglas	1962	1993	Rebranded as Piedmont Airlines
Henson Aviation				HNA	HENSON		1967	1979	
Hermens Air	Alaska		2E	HRM	HERMENS	Bethel	1974	1987	Bought by MarkAir, became MarkAir Express.
Heussler Air	Pennsylvania			HUS	HEUSSLER	Erie	1977	1994	Air taxi
Hoganair	Ohio			HGA	HOGAN AIR	Middletown	1989	1998	Renamed to Miami Valley Aviation
Holiday Airlines	California					Oakland	1956	1956	Operated de Havilland Dove
Holiday Airlines	California		HD	HD	HOLIDAY	Lake Tahoe	1965	1975	intrastate airline that operated Electra. Founder was co-founder of Paradise Airlines
Holiday Airlines	New York					Sullivan County	1970	1970	Known as Catskill Holiday Airlines. Operated Beech 99
Holiday Airlines	New Jersey					Newark	1979	1989	Owned subsidiary of Clinton Industries
Holiday Airlines	California					Orange County	1988	1990	Renamed to Pacific Coast Airline
Holiday Ways	California					Ontario	1988	1990	Operated Beech 18
Hood Airlines	Texas					Killeen–Fort Hood	1964	1970	Acquired by Rio Airways. Operated Beech 99
Hooters Air	South Carolina		H1			Myrtle Beach	2003	2006	Shut down by parent company
Hop-A-Jet				HPJ	HOPA-JET		1999	1999	
Horizon Airlines	Virginia			QXE	HORIZON AIR		1964	1970	Operated Piper Navajo and Piper Apache
Horizon Airways	Missouri					Kirksville	1969	1976	Renamed to Air Missouri
Horizon Cargo Transport							1978	1979	Renamed to Kahili Airlines
Houston Airlines	Virginia					Lynchburg	1967	1967	
Houston Commuter Airlines	Texas					Houston Bush	1968	1968	
Houston Metro Airlines	Texas					Clear Lake City STOLport	1969	1993	Renamed Metro Airlines
Huachuca Airlines	Arizona		7H			Sierra Vista	1983	1985	
Hub Airlines	Illinois			HUB	HUB	Chicago Meigs Field	1968	1974	Acquired Commuter Airlines. Operated Beech 99
Hub Air Service	Alaska					McGrath	1964	1976	Operated Cessna 195, Cherokee Six, Piper PA-22
Hubbard Air Transport	Washington					Seattle Lake Union Seaplane Base	1919	1920	On 3 March 1919 a B & W Seaplane made the first international US airmail flight
Hudson Air Service	Alaska					Talkeetna	1947	2010	Renamed to Sheldon Air Services
Hughes Airwest	California		RW		HUGHES-AIR	San Francisco	1968	1980	To Republic Airlines
Hughes Float Plane Service	Alaska					Homer	1990s	1990s	Air taxi
Hulman Airlines	Indiana					Terre Haute	1968	1975	Established as Hulman Field Aviation. Operated Cessna 310
Hulman Field Aviation	Indiana					Terre Haute	1959	1968	Renamed to Hulman Airlines
Hyannis Aviation	Massachusetts		YB	HAN	AIR HYANNIS	Barnstable	1977	1977	
I
IAero Airways	Florida		WQ	SWQ	SWIFTFLIGHT	Miami	1997	2024	Founded as Swift Air. Went bankrupt.
Ilan Airways, Inc.	New York						1984	1988	No flights
Illini Airlines	Ohio					Chicago Rockford	1956	1957	Merged with Taxi Air Group to form TAG Airlines
Illinois Airways	Illinois					Southern Illinois	1969	1972	Renamed to Air Illinois. Intrastate scheduled-service carrier
ImagineAir	Georgia			IMG		Lawrenceville	2004	2018	
Imperial Airlines						Miami	1960	1961	Supplemental air carrier previously Regina Cargo Airlines. Grounded after notorious 1961 crash
Imperial Airlines	California		II	IMP		Imperial	1964	1986	Founded as Visco Flyging Service
Imperial Commuter Airlines	California					Imperial	1967	1968	Operated Beech 18, Beech Bonanza
Imperial International	Minnesota			PNX	PHOENIX	South St. Paul	1981	1992	
Independence Air	Virginia		DH	IDE	INDEPENDENCE	Washington Dulles	1989	2006	Formed as Atlantic Coast Airlines
Independent Air	Georgia		ID	IDN	INDEPENDENT	Atlanta	1966	1990	Founded as Atlanta Skylarks
Indian Wells Airlines	California					Inyokern	1985	1985	Established as C&M Airlines
Indiana Airways			WY	INA	INDI-AIR		1978	1980	
Indigo Airlines	Illinois		I9	IBU	INDIGO BLUE	Chicago Midway	1999	2001	
Industrial Air Transport	California					Ontario	1946	1946	Operated for about three weeks for the Air Transport Command under this name before changing to Pacific Overseas Airlines
Indy Air Travel Club							1960s	1960s	Air travel club established as Four Winds. Operated Convair 880. Charter carrier
Inland Air Lines	Wyoming					Casper–Natrona	1930	1952	Incorporated under Western brand
Inland Aviation Services			7N				1996	2009	
Inland Empire Airlines	California		CC	IEA	INLAND EMPIRE	Reno–Tahoe	1978	1981	Acquired by Air Chaparral
Inlet Airlines	Alaska					Homer	1989	1999	Founded by Dennis Rothberg. Established as Cook Inlet Aviation. Operated Piper Cherokee
Inter Citiair Express	Washington					Seattle-Tacoma	1930	1930	Acquired by Alaska-Washington Airways. Operated Stinson Detroiter, Lockheed Vega
Inter-City Air Lines	Massachusetts					Boston	1932	1933	Operated Travel Air 6000
Inter-Island Air	Hawaii			UGL	UGLY VAN	Kahului	1990	1991	
Inter-Island Airways	Hawaii					Honolulu	1929	1941	Renamed to Hawaiian Airlines
Intercoastal Airways	Illinois			ICA	INTERCOASTAL	Willow Run	1986	1989	Operated C-117D
Intercontinental Airways			IL				1977	1981	Operated Boeing 707-321C, Douglas DC-8-33
Intercontinental US Inc.	New York					New York-LaGuardia	1960	1966	Operated Carvair, DC-4
Interior Air Taxis	Alaska					Fairbanks	1965	1968	Third-level services. Affiliate of Interior Airways
Interior Airways	Alaska					Anchorage	1946	1972	To Alaska International Air
Intermountain Air Service	Arizona					Marana Air Park	1973	1975	Air taxi affiliate of Intermountain Aviation
Intermountain Airways	Colorado						1978	1978	To ExpressJet Airlines
Intermountain Aviation	Arizona			IMA	INTER MOUNTAIN	Marana Air Park	1961	1975	CIA front. Assets acquired by Rosenbalm & Evergreen
International Air Cargo	Massachusetts					Boston	1974	1975	All-cargo operator
International Air Cargo	Michigan					Willow Run	1980	1985	
International Air Response	Arizona					Buckeye	1997	2000	Established as T & G Aviation. Aerial firefighting
International Air Service Company (IASCO)	California		IM	IAS	STARFLEET	Los Angeles	1978	1985	Contract flyer. Became Spirit of America Airlines
International Air Taxi	Alaska					Anchorage	1965	1970	Operated Cessna 180
International Air Taxi	Alaska					Anchorage	1980	1983	Affiliated with Wien Air Alaska
International Airlines	North Dakota					Minot	1928	1931	Operated Lockheed Vega. First US operator
International Airlines	California					Burbank	1961	1966	uncertificated carrier
International Airlines	Texas					San Antonio	1966	1967	Operated Douglas DC-7
International Airlines Academy	Illinois					Willow Run	1972	1975	Renamed Trans Continental Airlines
International Charter Xpress	Michigan			ICX	INTEX	Houston Bush	1992	1994	International Cargo Xpress dba Intl Charter Xpress commonly owned & merged w/ Air Transport Intl in 1994
International Parcel Express				IPX	SPEED PACK		1986	1988	
International U.S.							1968	1974	
Interstate Air Lines	California					Buchanan Field	1928	1930	
Interstate Airlines	Illinois					Springfield	1966	1968	Third-level carrier. Operated Cherokee Six
Interstate Airlines	Michigan; Arkansas		8C	INT	INTER-FLIGHT	Willow Run	1979	1988	Owner bought Air Transport International, operating w/ former Interstate assets.
Interstate Airmotive	Missouri					Lambert Field	1968	1972	Small supplemental air carrier. Operated DC-3s
Interstate World Airways	California					Los Angeles	1974	1975	Scheduled all-cargo services
Iowa Airways	Iowa		JT	IOA	IOWA AIR	Dubuque	1985	1994	Agreement with Midway Airlines. Operated Embraer Bandeirante
Iowa Airplane Company	Iowa						1933	1949	Renamed to Mid-West Airlines
Irvine Airways							1932	1932	
Island Air	Washington					Bremerton	1970	1970	Established as Island Sky Ferries. To form Puget Sound Airlines
Island Air	Hawaii					Honolulu	1971	1972	
Island Air	New York					Farmingdale	1976	1976	Operated DC-3
Island Air	Hawaii		WP	MKU	MOKU	Honolulu	1980	2017	Established as Princeville Airways
Island Air	New York		WS			Farmingdale	1984	1984	Successor to Trans East International
Island Air Charters	Florida			ILF		Fort Lauderdale	1986	2006	
Island Air Ferries	New York					New York-LaGuardia	1945	1953	Shuttle between JFK and LGA. Operated DC-3, Noorduyn Norseman
Island Airlines	Ohio					Erie–Ottawa	1929	1979	
Island Airlines	Massachusetts					New Bedford	1932	1932	Acquired by Maine Air Transport
Island Airlines	Massachusetts						1934	1934	Operated six Fairchild 71
Island Airlines	Massachusetts						1962	1962	Established as Sky Tours
Island Airlines	Massachusetts		IS	ISA	ISLAND	Hyannis	1991	2015	
Island Airlines Hawaii	Hawaii			ACH		Honolulu	1960	2002	Operated Convair 440
Island Airways	Michigan					Charlevoix	1975	2006	
Island Express			2S	SDY	SANDY ISLE		1996	2006	
Island Express Air	Hawaii					Honolulu	1994	1994	Renamed to Mahalo Air
Island Helicopters	New York					Garden City	1968	1977	Scheduled services to Manhattan
Island Mail	Washington					Friday Harbor	1966	1979	Scheduled commuter services. Operated Cessna 206
Island Pacific Air	Hawaii			PCR	PACAIR	Honolulu	1975	1977	
Island Sky Ferries	Washington					Bremerton	1948	1950	Established as Orcas Island Air Service. Operated Lockheed Model 10 Electra
Isle Royale Airways	Michigan					Houghton	1965	1965	Operated Grumman Mallard
Isle Royale Seaplane Service	Michigan					Houghton	1973	1975	Summer schedule
ITR Airlines	Colorado			ITR	OUTBACK	Denver	1984	1985	Assumed the Frontier Commuter operations

== See also ==
- List of airlines of the United States
- List of airports in the United States
- List of defunct airlines of Guam
- List of defunct airlines of Puerto Rico
- List of defunct airlines of the United States Virgin Islands
