= Greenville Airport =

Greenville Airport may refer to:

- Greenville Airport (Illinois), Greenville, Illinois, United States (FAA/IATA: GRE)
- Greenville Downtown Airport, Greenville, South Carolina, United States (FAA/IATA: GMU)
- Greenville Municipal Airport (Maine), Greenville, Maine, United States (FAA: 3B1)
- Greenville Municipal Airport (Michigan), Greenville, Michigan, United States (FAA: 6D6)
- Greenville Municipal Airport (Pennsylvania), Greenville, Pennsylvania, United States (FAA: 4G1)
- Greenville–Rainbow Airport, Greenville, Greene County, New York, United States (FAA: 1H4)
- Greenville–Spartanburg International Airport, Greer, South Carolina, United States (FAA/IATA: GSP)
- Greenville Mid-Delta Airport, Greenville, Mississippi, United States (FAA/IATA: GLH)
- Pitt–Greenville Airport, Greenville, North Carolina, United States (FAA/IATA: PGV)

== See also ==
- Donaldson Center Airport, Greenville, South Carolina, United States (FAA: GYH)
- Greenville Municipal Airport (disambiguation)
- Greenville Air Force Base (disambiguation)
