= Greenville Municipal Airport =

Greenville Municipal Airport may refer to:

- Greenville Municipal Airport (Maine), Greenville, Maine, United States (FAA: 3B1)
- Greenville Municipal Airport (Michigan), Greenville, Michigan, United States (FAA: 6D6)
- Greenville Municipal Airport (Mississippi), a former airport in Greenville, Mississippi, United States
- Greenville Municipal Airport (Pennsylvania), Greenville, Pennsylvania, United States (FAA: 4G1)

== See also ==
- Greenville Airport (disambiguation)
