= International Airlines =

International Airlines may refer to:

- International Airlines Group
- Defunct airlines in the United States, see List of defunct airlines of the United States (D–I).

== See also ==
- International airport
