= Greene Township, Mercer County, Pennsylvania =

Township in Pennsylvania, US

Coordinates: 41°27′00″N 80°30′59″W

Greene Township
- Township
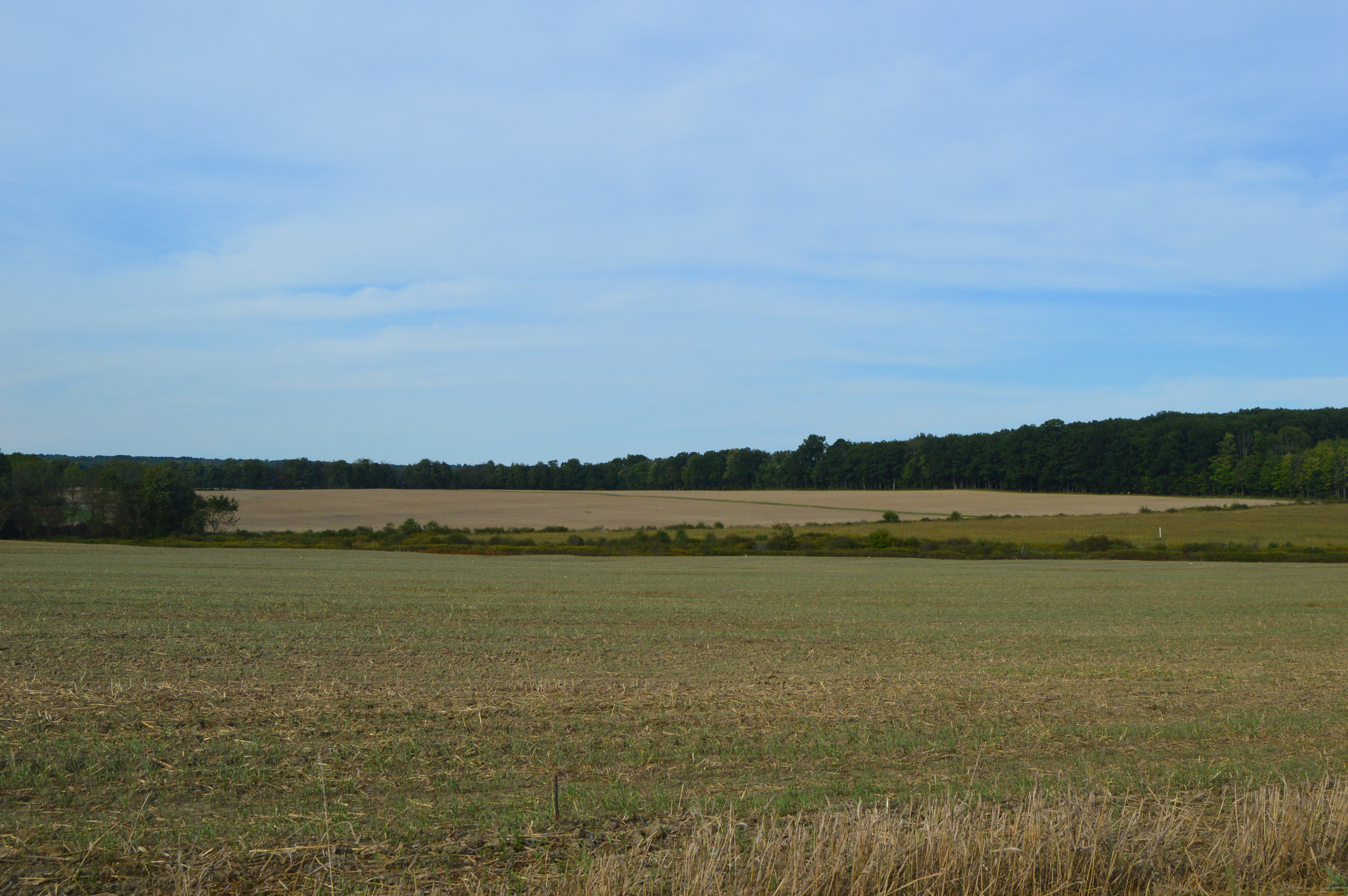
- Farmland near the Greenville Municipal Airport

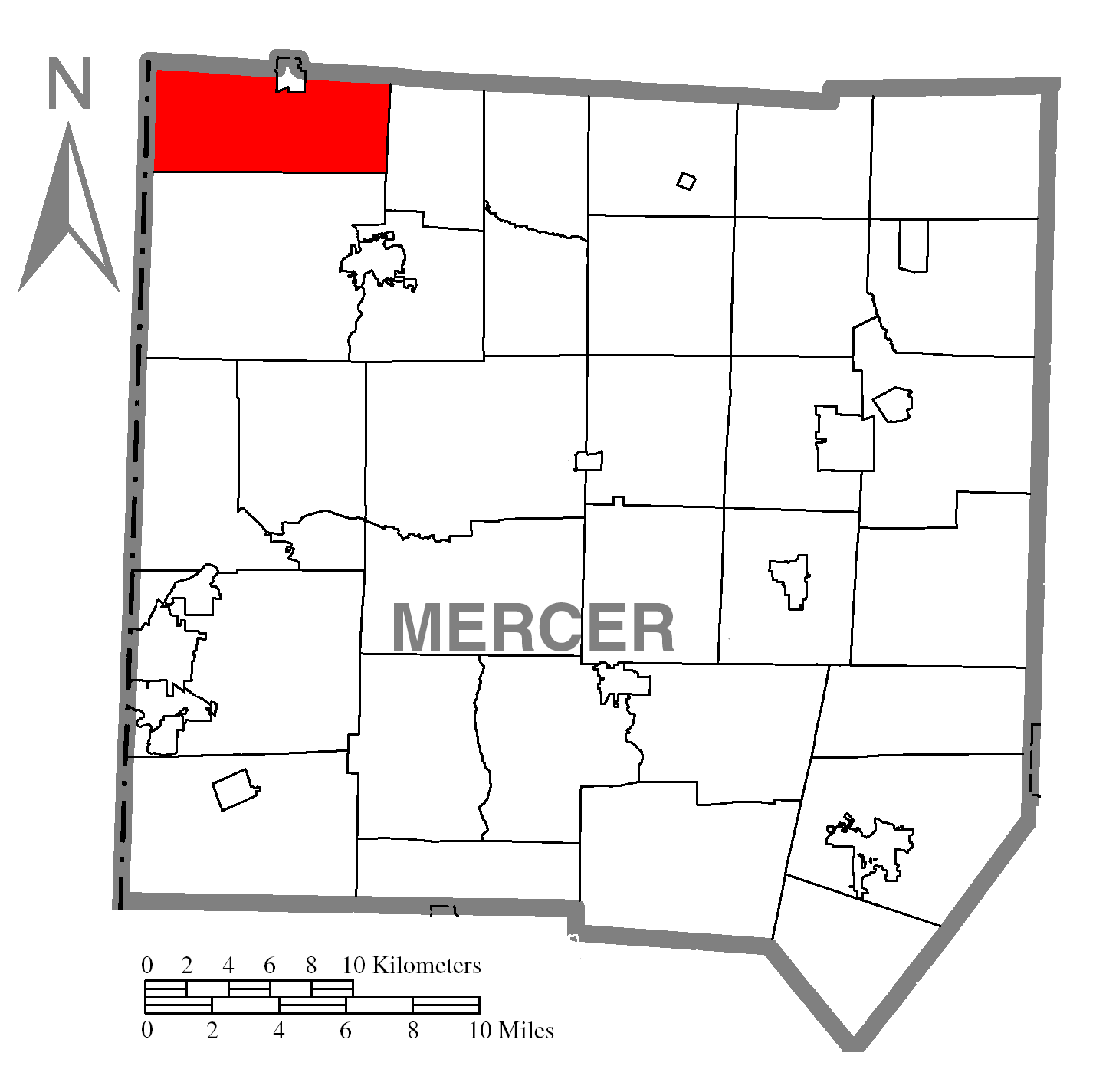
- Location of Greene Township in Mercer County

- Location of Mercer County in Pennsylvania
- Country: United States
- State: Pennsylvania
- County: Mercer

Area
  - Total: 21.85 sq mi (56.58 km^{2})
  - Land: 21.83 sq mi (56.54 km^{2})
  - Water: 0.015 sq mi (0.04 km^{2})

Population (2020)
  - Total: 1,054
  - Estimate (2023): 1,035
  - Density: 48.6/sq mi (18.77/km^{2})
- Time zone: UTC-4 (EST)
  - Summer (DST): UTC-5 (EDT)
- Area code: 724
- FIPS code: 42-085-30968

Historical population
Census	Pop.	Note	%±
2000	1,153		—
2010	1,091		−5.4%
2020	1,054		−3.4%
2023 (est.)	1,035		−1.8%
U.S. Decennial Census

Greene Township is a township in Mercer County, Pennsylvania, United States. At the 2020 census, the township population was 1,051, down from 1,091 in 2010.

== Geography ==
According to the United States Census Bureau, the township has a total area of 22.0 square miles (57 km^{2}), of which 21.9 square miles (57 km^{2}) is land and 0.04 square miles (0.10 km^{2}) (0.09%) is water.

== Demographics ==
As of census of 2000, there were 1,153 people, 452 households and 358 families residing in the township. The population density was 52.6 inhabitants per square mile (20.3/km^{2}). There were 484 housing units at an average density of 22.1/sq mi (8.5/km^{2}). The racial makeup of the township was 98.87% White, 0.43% Asian, and 0.69% from two or more races. Hispanic or Latino of any race were 0.09% of the population.

There were 452 households, of which 28.3% had children under the age of 18 living with them, 67.9% were married couples living together, 5.8% had a female householder with no husband present, and 20.6% were non-families. 17.7% of all households were made up of individuals, and 9.1% had someone living alone who was 65 years of age or older. The average household size was 2.54 and the average family size was 2.86.

In the township the population was spread out, with 20.6% under the age of 18, 7.5% from 18 to 24, 24.3% from 25 to 44, 31.6% from 45 to 64, and 16.1% who were 65 years of age or older. The median age was 44 years. For every 100 females there were 106.3 males. For every 100 females age 18 and over, there were 104.9 males.

The median income for a household in the township was $39,625 and the median income for a family was $43,500. Males had a median income of $31,467 and females $22,500. The per capita income was $17,442. About 5.8% of families and 7.3% of the population were below the poverty line, including 6.0% of those under age 18 and 9.1% of those age 65 or over.
