= Zantop International Airlines =

US cargo airline (1972–2005)

- DC-8-62AF Los Angeles 1985
IATA	ICAO	Call sign
VK	ZAN	ZANTOP
- Founded: 30 May 1972 (incorporated in Michigan)
- Commenced operations: June 1972
- Ceased operations: May 2005
- Operating bases: Ypsilanti, Michigan; Macon, Georgia (1980–1997)
- Fleet size: see Fleet
- Headquarters: Ypsilanti, Michigan, United States
- Founders: Duane Zantop; Howard Zantop; Lloyd Zantop
- Employees: 1,700 (1989)

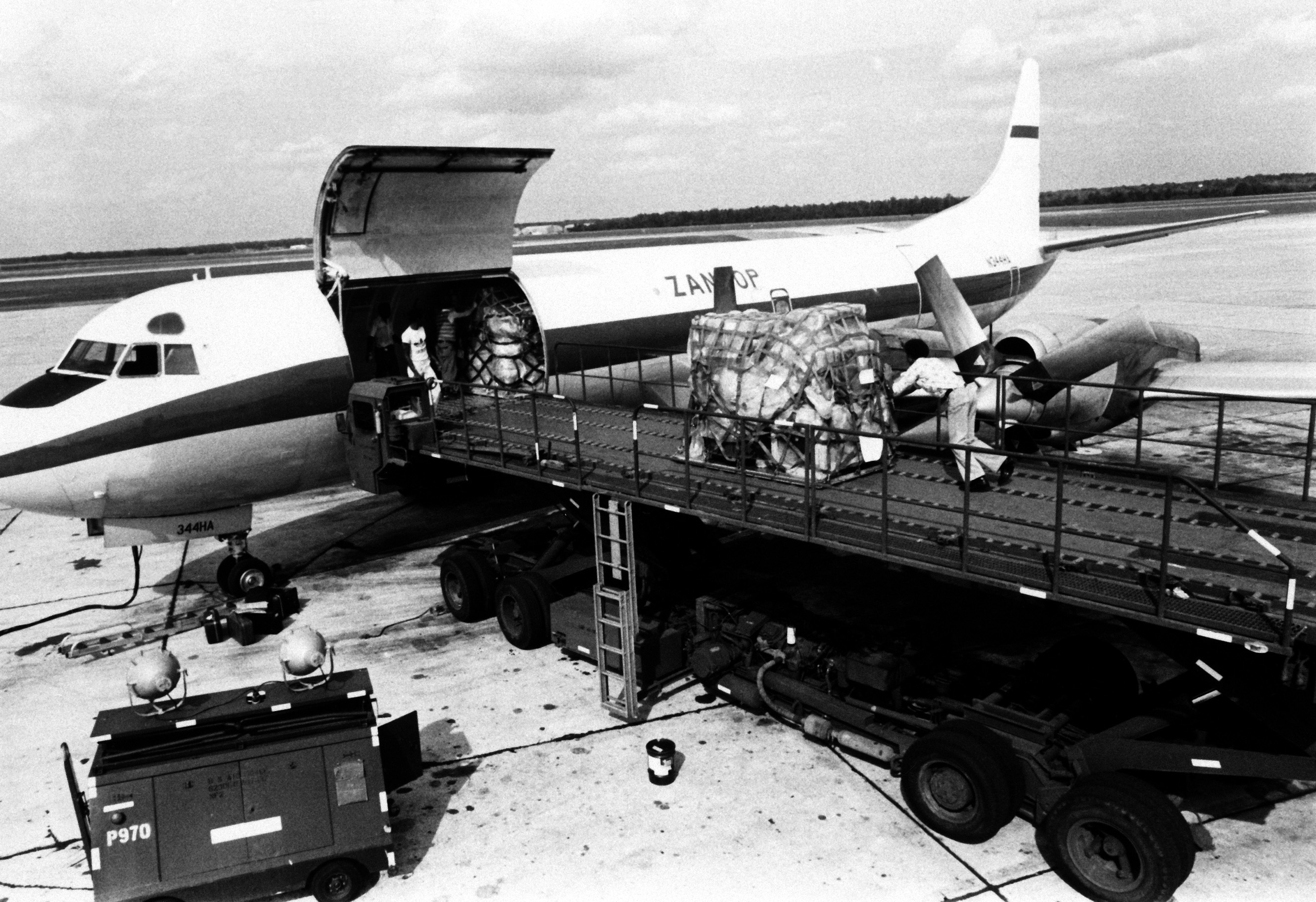
Electra at Warner Robins Air Logistics Center in Logair service 1981

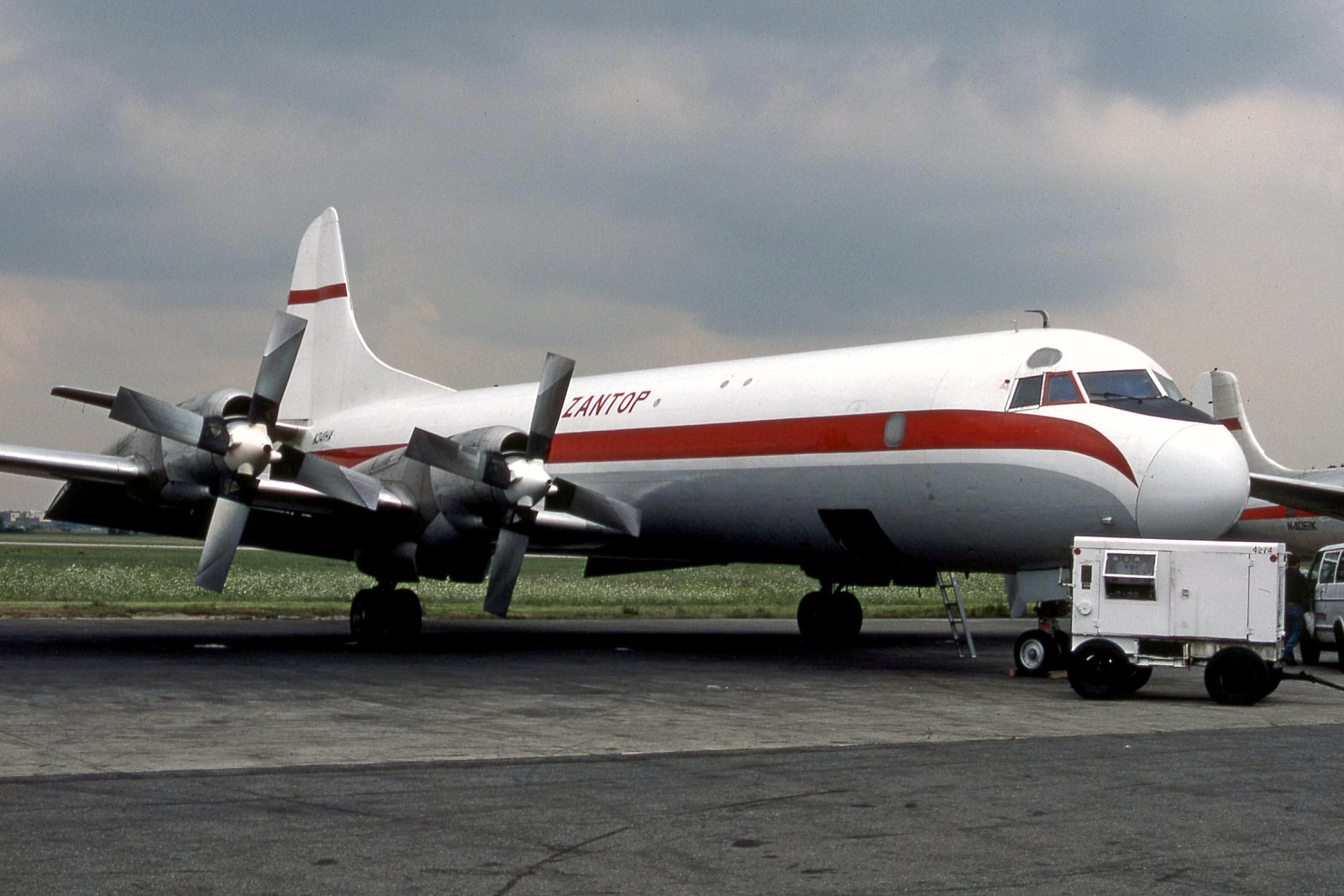
Electra freighter Willow Run Airport, August 1987

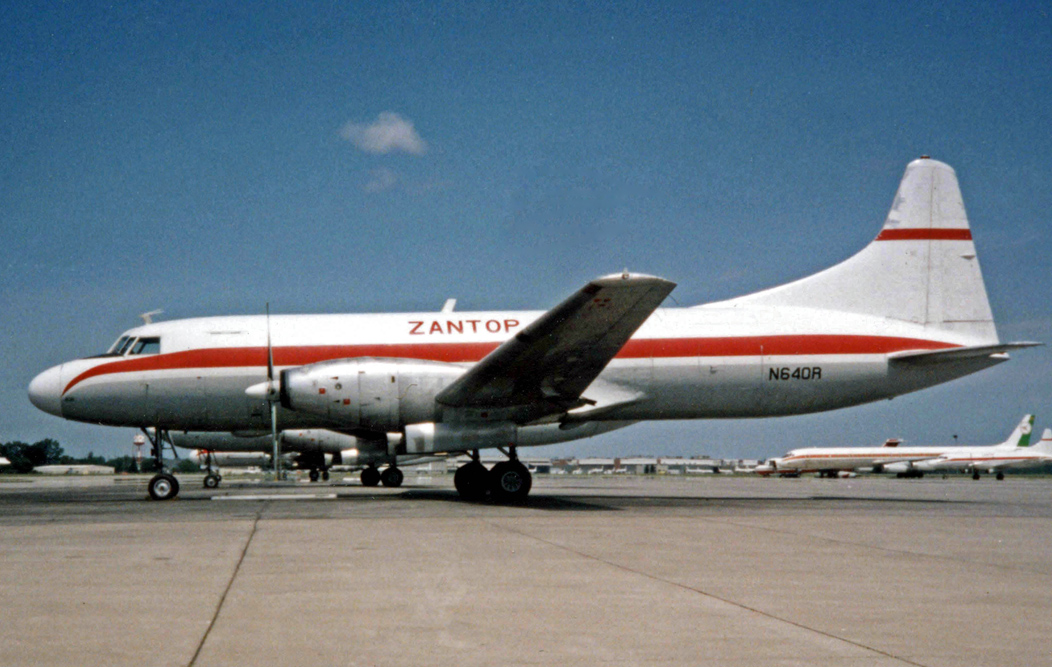
Convair 640 Ypsilanti 1992

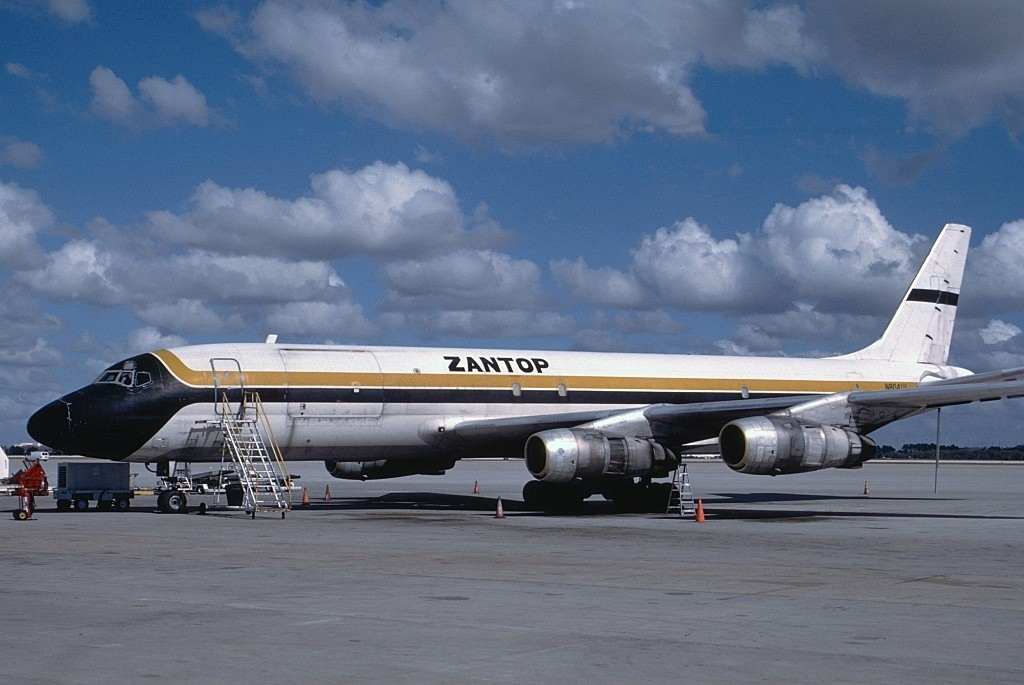
DC-8-54AF Orlando 1996, still in underlying Trans Continental livery

Zantop International Airlines, Inc. was a United States charter operator, originally uncertificated by the Civil Aeronautics Board (CAB), the now defunct Federal agency that, at the time, tightly regulated almost all US air transport. ZIA escaped CAB regulation by not being a common carrier, but originally worked exclusively for the Big Three automakers, transporting parts. In 1977 it received its certification as a supplemental air carrier from the CAB. ZIA was incorporated in May 1972 as a Michigan corporation, the stock of which was predominantly owned by the Zantop family.

Freight airline Trans Continental Airlines also originated from the bankruptcy of Universal, with the involvement of the Zantops, as related below.

See External links for a very good photo of the Zantop hub operation at night at Willow Run Airport.

== History ==
=== Context ===
The Zantop brothers, Duane, Howard and Lloyd, started a fixed-base operator in 1946 called Zantop Flying Service, which was incorporated in 1956 as Zantop Air Transport, an uncertificated airline or Part 45 carrier (an airline that was not a common carrier). In 1962 it was certificated as a supplemental air carrier. In 1966, the brothers sold out to a new owner which renamed the business Universal Airlines. In May 1972, financial difficulties caused Universal Airlines to cease operations.

=== Startup ===
On 30 May 1972, the same three Zantop brothers, along with two minor investors, incorporated Zantop International Airlines, Inc. (ZIA). ZIA was a Part 121 commercial operator, an airline that held Federal Aviation Administration (FAA) operational certification, but no economic certification from the CAB because it was not a common carrier; it did not accept shipments from the public. ZIA performed its first commercial operations in June 1972.

=== Operations ===
In 1977, as a result of legislation that required all airlines flying for the military to be certificated, ZIA applied for and received CAB certification as a supplemental air carrier. ZIA was then a contractor for the United States Air Force Logair program for the next 14 years, from 1977 to 1991 when it was underbid and lost the contract (the Logair program ended completely in 1992).

In 1980, ZIA bought the mainland cargo business of Hawaiian Airlines (branded Hawaiian Air Cargo, also focused on Logair), including Hawaiian's Electras and its hangar at Macon, Georgia. A 21 March 1982 windstorm collapsed the ZIA hangar at Macon and crushed two Lockheed Electras within. The hangar was rebuilt, larger than before. ZIA's Macon presence survived the loss of the Logair contract and in 1996, ZIA got a contract with ValuJet to perform C-checks. The next year, however, ZIA sold its Macon operation.

From 1972 to 1978 Zantop flew the DC-6, the Lockheed L-188 Electra, the Convair CV-640 and several Douglas DC-8 freighters. In 1978 DC-8s were also used for passenger charter flights. In 1980 Zantop also purchased the freight division of Hawaiian Airlines and with it came more Electras. By this time Zantop was one of the largest airlines in the freight business. ZIA had an oversized cargo hub at Ypsilanti, Michigan that served numerous cities in the U.S. on a weeknight basis. A system route map published by Zantop in 1985 lists service to 32 airports in the central and eastern U.S. all served from the airline's hub located at the Willow Run Airport (YIP).

In the late 1980s Duane Zantop's son Jimmy took over after Duane experienced physical problems. Duane Zantop is credited with building the business while his son Jimmy Zantop is remembered for cautiously expanding opportunities globally. Both are credited with recognizing the unique opportunities created by the airline's rare certificates which allowed it to operate globally with very few political restrictions.

In 1994 the pilots of Zantop voted to join the Teamsters union primarily known for organizing auto workers. Partially in response Zantop created a dedicated FAR Part 125 Certificate that could operate without unionized pilots but this was insufficient to save the airline from the rapidly evolving air freight industry and competition from much larger UPS and FedEx. In the early 2000s Zantop surrendered their operating certificates to the FAA, sold their aging aircraft and ceased operations.

== Freight contracts ==
ZIA contracted to serve the automotive industry on demand and served it very well for decades. When an automotive production line was not going to get a shipment of assembly parts on time ZIA would be called to fly automobile parts from a subassembly production line to a major production line due to the economics of shutting down unionized labor assembly facilities.

Other contracts during this period included:

- Channel Express (callsign ChanEx) starting December 1989 and continuing into 1997 and possibly later initially operating from Stansted, England later expanding to Edinburgh, Scotland
- US postal contracts at Christmas with hubs at various bases
- Roadway Global from its Terre Haute, Indiana hub
- Fred Olsen's Shipping Line of Norway for DHL Copenhagen, Denmark
- Lynden Air Cargo of Alaska including general freight and US Postal Service subcontracts
- United States military including domestic USAF Log Air and USN Quick Trans and overseas flights
- Contracts with FEMA that provided hurricane damage response to the Caribbean

In the 1990s Zantop continued the military LogAir Contract until its expiration in late 1991. These routes were well served by Zantop - their best on-time performer (at least on paper) serving many military bases from coast to coast. Electra hubs for this contract included Robins AFB in Warner Robins, Georgia and Hill AFB in Ogden, Utah; the Convair was flown through Dayton, Ohio and points north.

ZIA began its overseas Electra L-188 contracts with Channel Express of Bournemouth, England in the latter part of 1989. Contracts included flying fresh flowers and newspapers from inland England to the English Channel Islands of Jersey and Guernsey. Additional contracts included Her Majesty's Mail and Parcel Post, UPS and occasionally FEDEX. UPS was flown initially from Southend at the mouth of the River Thames to Cologne, Germany. From Cologne (Köln) ZIA flew to Zaragosa, Spain.

In Alaska ZIA contracted with Lynden Air Cargo flying Electra L-188s. The US Postmaster was known to come on board to postmark freight being transported from Anchorage to the outback. The Electra was known to carry 30,000 pounds of frozen fish back to Anchorage. Points served in Alaska included Anchorage, Bethel, Aniak, St. Mary's, Dillingham, King Salmon, Nome, Kotzebue, Kodiak, and several other cities.

ZIA also contracted with the Norwegian shipping and air cargo carrier Fred Olsen Shipping Company to fly DHL contracts from Copenhagen, Denmark to Nuremberg, Germany and on to Bergamo, Italy. The following day the route was retraced adding Billund, Denmark on the return trip. Sunday afternoons provided a daylight flight over the German, Italian, and Swiss Alps.

== Trans Continental Airlines ==
Freight airline Trans Continental Airlines (TCA) had similar origins to ZIA. Simultaneously with receiving incorporation papers from the Zantop brothers on 30 May 1972, the state of Michigan received incorporation papers for International Airlines Academy, a pilot training company spun out of Universal Airlines training group. The main TCA incorporator was Ronald Deane Melvin, who was one of the minor founding investors in ZIA mentioned above. Likewise, the Zantop brothers were three of five minor founding investors in the Academy. In 1975 the academy started its own freight airline, Trans Continental Airlines, which also operated from Willow Run Airport.

== Fleet ==
World Airline Fleets 1979 (copyright 1979) shows ZIA with:

- 12 Douglas DC-6A/B
- 16 Lockheed L-188 Electra
- 12 Convair 640
- 2 Douglas DC-8-21
- 3 Douglas DC-8-33

1987-88 World Airline Fleets (copyright 1987) shows ZIA with:

- 1 Beech KingAir
- 2 Falcon 20
- 11 Douglas DC-6A/B
- 21 Lockheed L-188 Electra
- 9 Convair 640
- 7 Douglas DC-8-62

Zantop also operated the following aircraft from unknown years

- 1 Boeing 747-100 (N810U)
- 1 Douglas DC-9-30 (N918U)
- 1 Grumman Gulfstream I (N190DM)

== Accidents ==
- 30 April 1975: Lockheed L-188A Electra freighter, N283F, landing in Deadhorse, AK from Fairbanks in poor weather, landed heavily a thousand feet down the runway, the left wing detached and the aircraft flipped over. Crew was safe but the aircraft was a writeoff. The crew was cited for failure to go around.
- 30 May 1984: Flight 931, a Lockheed L-188A Electra freighter, N5523, serial number 188A-1034, bound from Baltimore to Ypsilanti disintegrated over Pennsylvania after being subjected to extreme aerodynamic loads as a result of failure of the crew to properly respond to conflicting information when the aircraft entered into an unusual attitude caused by avionics failure. The aircraft was destroyed and all on board, three crew and one non-revenue passenger, died.

== See also ==
- Zantop Air Transport
- Zantop Airways
- Universal Airlines (United States)
- Trans Continental Airlines
- Hawaiian Air Cargo
- Uncertificated carrier
- Supplemental air carrier
- List of defunct airlines of the United States
