= Middle Georgia Regional Airport =

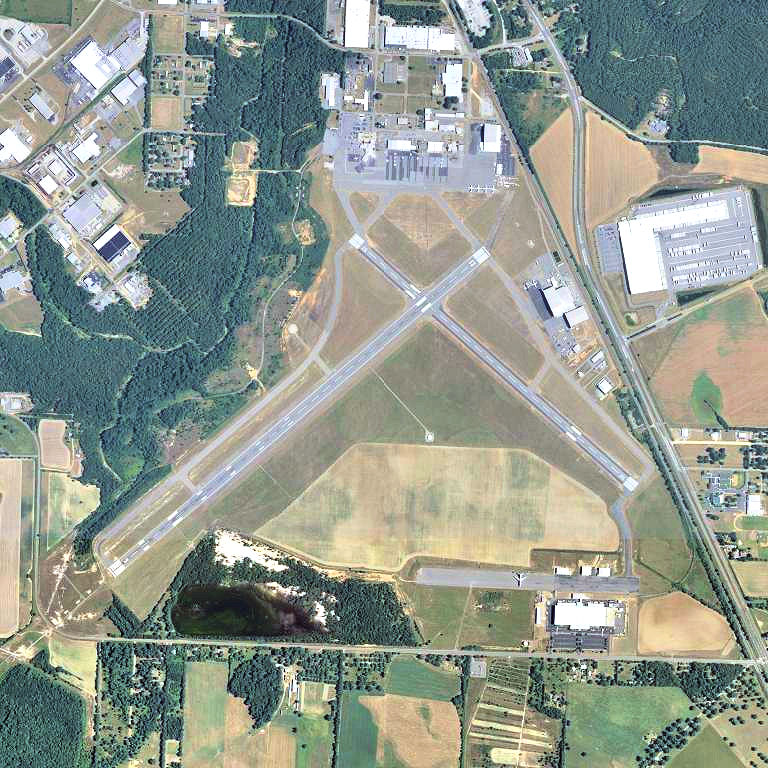
- IATA: MCN; ICAO: KMCN; FAA LID: MCN; WMO: 72217

Summary
- Airport type: Public
- Owner: Macon-Bibb County
- Operator: TBI Airport Management Inc
- Serves: Macon, Georgia and Warner Robins, Georgia
- Location: Bibb County, between Macon and Warner Robins
- Time zone: EST (UTC−05:00)
  - Summer (DST): EDT (UTC−04:00)
- Elevation AMSL: 108 m (354 ft)
- Coordinates: 32°41′34″N 083°38′57″W
- Website: iFlyMacon.com

Map
- Location of airport in Georgia MCN (the United States)

Runways
| Direction | Length | | Surface |
| Direction | ft | m | Surface |
|---|---|---|---|
| 5/23 | 6,500 | 1,981 | Asphalt |
| 13/31 | 5,000 | 1,524 | Asphalt |

Statistics (2023)
- Aircraft operations (year ending 4/30/2023): 19,725
- Based aircraft: 84
- Source: Federal Aviation Administration

Middle Georgia Regional Airport (IATA: MCN, ICAO: KMCN, FAA LID: MCN) is a city-owned, public-use airport located nine nautical miles (10 mi, 17 km) south of the central business district of Macon, a city in Bibb County, Georgia, United States. It is mostly used for general aviation, but is also served by one commercial airline.

As per the Federal Aviation Administration, this airport had 10,029 passenger boardings (enplanements) in calendar year 2008, 1,866 in 2009, and 1,296 in 2010. The National Plan of Integrated Airport Systems for 2011–2015 categorized it as a primary commercial service airport based on enplanements in 2008 (more than 10,000 per year).

== History ==
Early in 1940, Macon's Chamber of Commerce began a campaign to bring war industries and defense installations to the city. Negotiations with the Army Air Corps resulted in a tract of land in a highly developed agricultural area nine miles (14 km) south of the City known as Avondale being selected by the Air Corps.

The City of Macon and Bibb County obtained options on the desired tracts of land. Once the Army Air Corps finally decided to build an airbase at the site, it required the base be built as soon as possible. An informal agreement with the Army stipulated that when the War Department had no further use for the property, the deed would revert to the City and the County.

On August 17, 1941, the first class of British Royal Air Force cadets arrived at Cochran Field under the Arnold Scheme. Until June 1942, Cochran was used exclusively for British training. With the last British class graduating in early 1943, the War Department constituted and activated the 27th Flying Training Wing (Basic) at Cochran and assigned it to the (redesignated) AAF Eastern Flying Training Command as a flying training unit. Peak training took place during 1943. From the beginning of 1944 flight training steadily diminished. The Air Force inactivated the base on 15 December 1945.

Following the war, Cochran was utilized for various purposes. Smart Field remained as Macon's municipal airport until 1947. After a tornado swept Smart Field, the airlines moved their operations to Cochran where they remain to this day. The passenger terminal was built in 1959 and extensively renovated in 2003.

The two Army built hangars still exist along with a few old warehouses. The Air Force at one time had a presence at the airport, hosting the 202d Engineering Installation Squadron, a non-flying engineering unit of the Georgia Air National Guard. However, this unit was relocated to nearby Robins AFB at the end of Fiscal Year 2011 pursuant to BRAC action.

All areas in Bibb County became a part of the Macon city limits effective January 1, 2014, due to the consolidation of the Macon and Bibb County governments. Previously the airport was in an unincorporated area.

In June 2019, Brazilian regional jet manufacturer Embraer announced it would open a repair and maintenance facility for its ERJ and E-Jet commercial aircraft at the airport, in a hangar previously occupied by HAECO.

Middle Georgia Regional Airport has also previously been known as Lewis B. Wilson Municipal Airport (named for the mayor of Macon between 1948 and 1953), Macon Municipal Airport, and Cochran Field.

=== Hawaiian Air Cargo ===
From 1976 to 1977 and again from 1978 to 1980, Hawaiian Airlines had a mainland air cargo division called Hawaiian Air Cargo based at the airport, focused on the United States Air Force Logair domestic cargo program. Warner Robins Air Force Base was a major point on the Logair network, so Macon was convenient. Hawaiian used Lockheed L-188 Electra freighter aircraft. The airline won an Air Force contract for 1976–1977, but then lost the lease of the aircraft it was using and was unable to bid for 1977–1978. In 1978 Hawaiian tried once more with a new batch of aircraft. Hawaiian Air Cargo operated again 1978–1980. During this second stint, the airport built a hangar for Hawaiian. But in 1980, Hawaiian sold the operation to Zantop International Airlines.

=== Zantop International Airlines ===
Zantop International Airlines, (ZIA) a cargo airline based in Ypsilanti, Michigan near Detroit, had a maintenance base at the airport until 1997, after buying out Hawaiian's cargo division. ZIA operated for Logair until 1991, when it lost the contract. In 1982, a windstorm collapsed the ZIA hangar, crushing two Lockheed Electra aircraft. The hangar was rebuilt, but larger, the next year. ZIA's presence at the airport survived the loss of its Logair contract, and in 1996, ZIA gained a contract with ValuJet to perform C-checks at the airport. However, ZIA sold its Macon operations in 1997.

=== History of commercial service ===
Commercial airlines historically serving the airport included Delta Air Lines and Eastern Airlines, both beginning in the 1940s using Douglas DC-3 aircraft. Both carriers later upgraded with Convair 440 aircraft and during the 1970s decade both carriers operated McDonnell Douglas DC-9 jets from Macon on flights to Atlanta. Eastern ended their service in 1979 and Delta transferred their service to Atlantic Southeast Airlines operating as Delta Connection in the mid-1980s. Eastern Express operated by Metro Airlines on behalf of Eastern Airlines brought back a return of Eastern service in late 1986. Both carriers provided service to Atlanta using a variety of commuter prop aircraft. In 1988 Piedmont Commuter operated by CCAir began service to Charlotte using Jetstream 31 prop aircraft. In 1989 Piedmont Airlines was merged into USAir at which time Piedmont Commuter became USAir Express. Eastern Airlines went out of business in early 1991 discontinuing its Eastern Express service while USAir Express discontinued service at nearly the same time. Delta Connection, operated by ASA, continued service until October 1, 2007. In the latter years, the service averaged around 20,000 passengers per year. In 2008, GeorgiaSkies began serving Macon with flights to Atlanta under an Essential Air Service contract. GeorgiaSkies flew single engine Cessna 208 Caravan aircraft. GeorgiaSkies' Macon service saw 3,000 passengers in its first year, but by 2011, it saw just under 2,000 passengers, averaging 3 per day. In 2013 Silver Airways took over with flights to Atlanta and Orlando but soon discontinued service in late 2014. The Macon airport then saw no commercial air service for nearly three years.

On August 12, 2017, Contour Airlines began offering daily flights to and from Baltimore/Washington International Airport using 30-passenger ERJ-135 aircraft under an Alternative Essential Air Service contract. resulting in a substantial recovery in passenger numbers from the GeorgiaSkies and Silver days. Contour also briefly offered flights to and from Tampa between December 2018 and February 2019, with less success than its Baltimore route. In addition to these scheduled flights, a number of irregular casino charters have been offered in recent years. On May 1, 2025, Contour switched its destination from Baltimore to Dulles International Airport citing more options for connecting destinations through the airline's connection agreement with United Airlines. In July 2025, Spirit Airlines announced that it would begin service from Macon to Fort Lauderdale–Hollywood International Airport beginning in mid-October; however, as the airline declared bankruptcy for a second time in 2025 in early September, it announced that it would cancel service from 12 cities and no longer planned to begin service from Macon. Following Spirit Airlines' decision not to proceed with its planned service between Macon and Fort Lauderdale–Hollywood International Airport, Contour Airlines subsequently launched service between the two cities on June 9, 2026 using 30-passenger ERJ-135 aircraft.

== Facilities and aircraft ==
Middle Georgia Regional Airport covers an area of 1,149 acres (465 ha) at an elevation of 354 feet (108 m) above mean sea level. It has two asphalt paved runways: 5/23 is 6,500 by 150 feet (1,981 by 46 m) and 13/31 is 5,000 by 150 feet (1,524 by 46 m).

For the 12-month period ending April 30, 2023, the airport had 19,725 aircraft operations, an average of 54 per day: 87% general aviation, 3% military, 9% air taxi, and 1% scheduled commercial. At that time 84 aircraft were based at this airport: 43 single-engine, 27 multi-engine, 11 jet, and 3 helicopters.

== Airlines and destinations ==
| Airlines | Destinations | Refs. |
|---|---|---|
| Contour Airlines | Baltimore, Fort Lauderdale, Nashville (begins March 1, 2027) | |

== See also ==
- List of airports in Georgia (U.S. state)

== Other sources ==
- Shettle, M. L. (2005), Georgia's Army Airfields of World War II. ISBN 0-9643388-3-1
- Essential Air Service documents (Docket DOT-OST-2007-28671) from the U.S. Department of Transportation:
  - Ninety-Day Notice (July 2, 2007): Atlantic Southeast Airlines, Inc. gives notice of its intent to discontinue its service between Macon, Georgia, and Atlanta, Georgia after October 1, 2007. ASA's service is operated as "Delta Connection" service under agreements with Delta Air Lines, Inc.
  - Order 2008-5-43 (June 3, 2008): selecting Pacific Wings, L.L.C. d/b/a Georgia Skies, to provide subsidized essential air service (EAS) at Athens and Macon, with 9-seat Cessna Grand Caravan C 208B turboprop aircraft, for the two-year period beginning when the carrier inaugurates full EAS at both communities, at an annual subsidy of $2,437,692.
  - Order 2011-1-17 (January 18, 2011): terminating the carrier-selection case at Macon, Georgia, and relying on Pacific Wings, LLC, d/b/a Georgia Skies to provide subsidy-free essential air service (EAS) at the community as it proposed. We are also terminating Pacific Wings’ current subsidy at the community effective seven days after the issuance of this order.
  - 90-day notice (April 26, 2012): of Pacific Wings' intent to terminate unsubsidized service to Macon, Ga. effective July 26, 2012. We are taking this action due to the potential for USDOT to introduce federally subsidized competitors in EAS locations already receiving service at no cost to the federal government, just as the Department recently did in Kalaupapa, Hawaii.
  - Order 2012-5-25 (May 24, 2012): prohibits Pacific Wings, L.L.C., d/b/a Georgia Skies, from terminating service at Macon, Georgia, for 30 days beyond the end of the 90-day notice period, i.e., August 25, 2012. We are also requesting proposals from air carriers interested in providing Essential Air Service (EAS) at Macon, with or without subsidy.
  - Order 2013-2-26 (February 27, 2013): selecting Silver Airways to provide Essential Air Service (EAS) at Macon, Georgia, for an annual subsidy of $1,998,696. The service to be provided will be one nonstop round trip per weekday and one per weekend (six a week) to Atlanta, Georgia, and one nonstop round trip per weekday and one per weekend (six a week) to Orlando, Florida, using 34-passenger Saab 340B aircraft for the two-year period beginning when Silver commences full EAS.
  - Order 2014-4-26 (April 24, 2014): directing interested persons to show cause as to why the Department should not terminate the eligibility ... under the Essential Air Service (EAS) program based on criteria passed by Congress in the FAA Modernization and Reform Act of 2012 (Public Law No. 112-95). We find that Macon is within 175 miles of a large or medium hub, Hartsfield-Jackson Atlanta International Airport (ATL), a large hub, and, thus, is subject to the 10-enplanement statutory criterion. We also find that during fiscal year 2013, Macon generated a total of 2,482 passengers (inbound plus outbound). Consistent with the methodology described above, that results in an average of 4.0 enplanements per day, below the 10-enplanement statutory criterion necessary to remain eligible in the EAS program.
