= Greenville Air Force Base =

Greenville Air Force Base may refer to:

- Greenville Air Force Base (Mississippi), a former U.S. Air Force base
- Greenville Air Force Base (South Carolina), later Donaldson Air Force Base, a former U.S. Air Force base

== See also ==
- Greenville Airport (disambiguation)
