= Gulf Air Transport =

Small charter airline

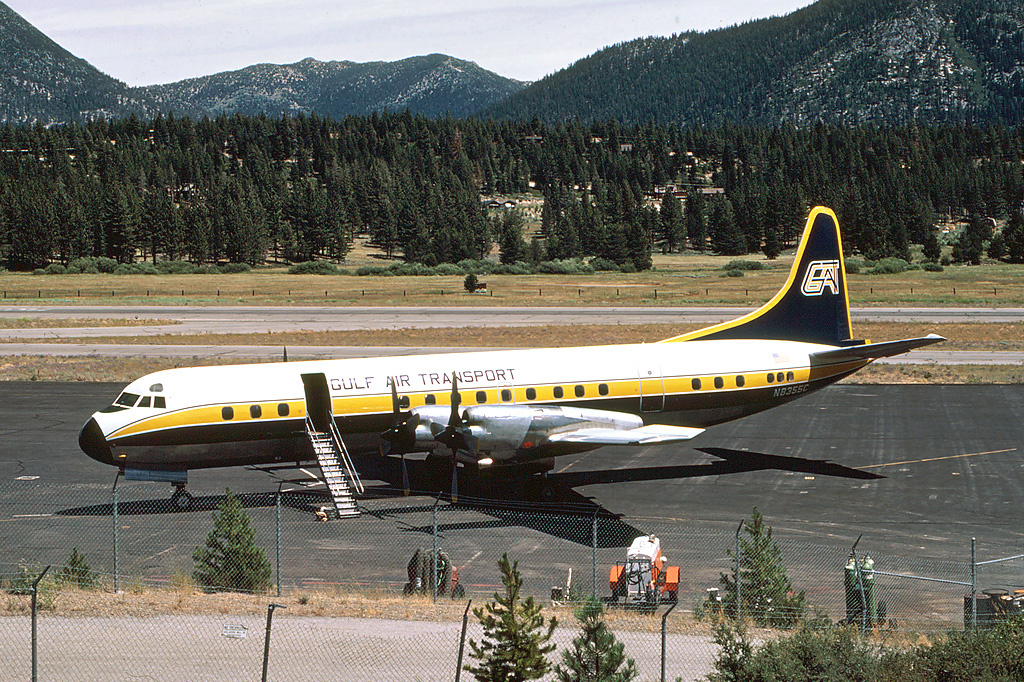
- Gulf Air Transport Lockheed L-188C Electra at Lake Tahoe Airport
| IATA | ICAO | Call sign |
|---|---|---|
| - | GAT | - |
- Commenced operations: 1979; 47 years ago
- Ceased operations: 2000; 26 years ago
- Operating bases: Acadiana Regional Airport
- Fleet size: See Fleet details below
- Headquarters: New Iberia, Louisiana, United States

Gulf Air Transport (ICAO: GAT) was a small charter airline headquartered at the Acadiana Regional Airport (ARA), a former U.S. Navy military airbase located near New Iberia, Louisiana, United States. The company flew piston, turboprop and jet aircraft types, and conducted flight operations from 1979 until 1990.

== History ==
Gulf Air Transport was founded in 1979. Initially, the management planned to obtain their own operating certificate and purchase a single Convair 440 (N4815C) from Smyrna, TN-based Music City Airways. However, after an evaluation, it was decided to buy Music City's FAA operating certificate along with their only other airplane, a Convair 340 (N3416). After changing Music City Airways name to Gulf Air Transport, management then initiated charter flight operations in support of the U.S. domestic oil and gas industry with two captains and two first officers flying the piston-powered Convairs. Next, they added a former North Central Airlines Convair 580 turboprop aircraft which they purchased in Bolivia (N511GA) which was then shortly followed by their final R2800 piston powered Convair 440 (N411GA). In 1981, a Lockheed L-188 Electra (N8355C) four engine turboprop was added to the fleet. The Electra was used for oil and gas industry charters flying offshore workers between the U.S. Gulf Coast and Santa Barbara, California, and also for gambling charters to and from Lake Tahoe, California. In addition, the company was purchasing Republic Airlines Convair 580 turboprops as Republic retired these aircraft which had been previously operated by North Central Airlines as well. On April 24, 1984, Gulf Air purchased their first jet, a Boeing 727-100 (N4620) from Pan Am, which included flight crew training at the Pan Am training center. This initial B727 was followed by the acquisition of Boeing 727-200 jetliners by Gulf Air.

The company added new contracts for the transportation of various college athletic teams as well as gambling junkets for the casino industry, especially to and from the Lake Tahoe area in California, and pursued other new charter opportunities as the oil and gas industry started cutting back in the early 1980s. The company opened new flight crew bases in Philadelphia, Dallas, Boston, and Detroit. Philadelphia was the largest base. The airline also flew numerous charters to such international destinations as Port-au-Prince in Haiti, British Guiana (now known as Guyana) in South America, Nassau and Freeport in the Bahamas, San Juan, Puerto Rico, St. Thomas, St. Croix, Aruba, Bonaire and Barbados in the Caribbean, and Cancún and Puerto Vallarta in Mexico. Domestic charter destinations included Las Vegas, St. Louis, Orlando, Lake Tahoe and Atlantic City as well as other destinations. Other domestic cities were served by short-term contracts or as the first stop on outbound flights including Baltimore, New York City, and Newark.

One-time charter flights were operated as well, including weekend sports charters, to many international destinations including Rock Sound International Airport in the Bahamas, Curaçao, Grenada and Puerto Plata in the Caribbean, Bermuda and also to Europe including London, England, Helsinki, Finland, and Warsaw, Poland. By the end of 1986, Gulf Air Transport had approximately 200 full-time employees.

In 1988, Gulf Air sent several Boeing 727-200 jetliners to Malta in the Mediterranean for a six-month "sub-service contract" with Air Malta. The flight attendants and pursers were Air Malta employees while the flight crews and aircraft maintenance technicians were Gulf Air Transport employees. The 727s were used to operate scheduled passenger airline service for Air Malta.

=== TransOcean Airways ===
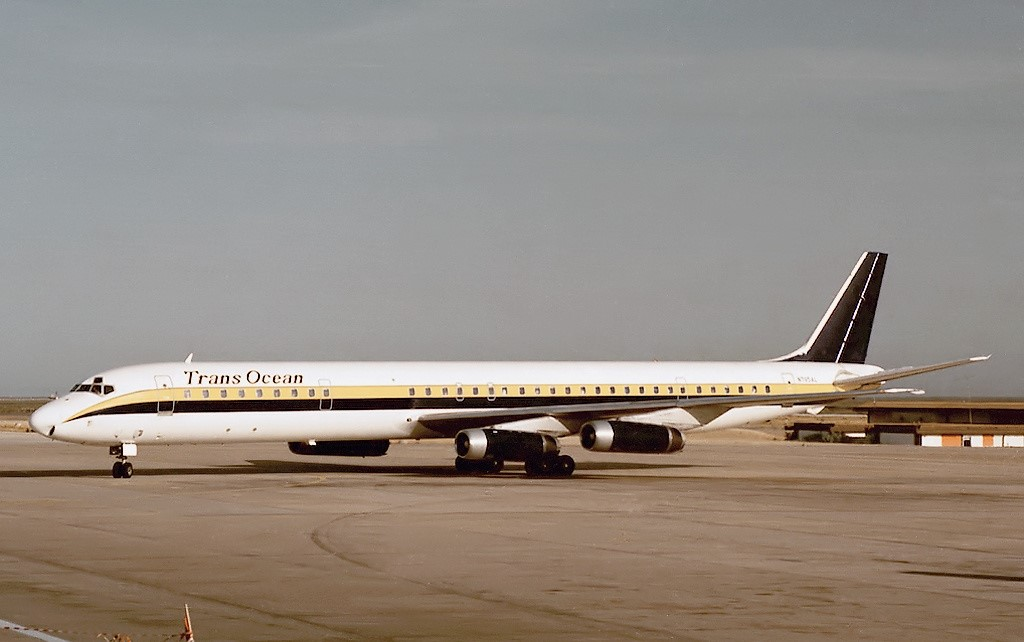
TransOcean Airways McDonnell Douglas DC-8-63

About 1986, the company changed its name from Gulf Air Transport to Gulf Air, Inc. However, when starting European service, and due to the similarity of this name with Bahrain-based Gulf Air, the airline changed its name to TransOcean Airways. During this period, the former Gulf Air Transport, which was now a successful, privately held company, decided to go public and thus offered stock in the firm which then subsequently led to loss of managerial control of the company. Reportedly, former Capitol Air (not to be confused with Capital Airlines) and Arrow Air management personnel took the company in a different direction and added two stretched Douglas Super DC-8-63 jetliner from Scanair and one stretched Douglas Super DC-8-71 leased from United Airlines to the fleet. The Super DC-8-71 featured new high-bypass turbofan engines which enabled longer range operations and also produced less noise. These new managers also hired additional flight attendants to crew their new transatlantic services to Ireland, England, Italy, Finland and the Azores. However, the DC-8 jetliners were often grounded and experienced long, expensive maintenance delays that required more financial resources than TransOcean had access to. Along with a recession in the US economy in the 1980s, TransOcean began to lose money and by 1989 it had to seek protection from its creditors by entering Chapter 11 bankruptcy. The company subsequently failed to turn a profit and in March 1990 all flight operations ceased with the airline then going out of business.

== Fleet details ==
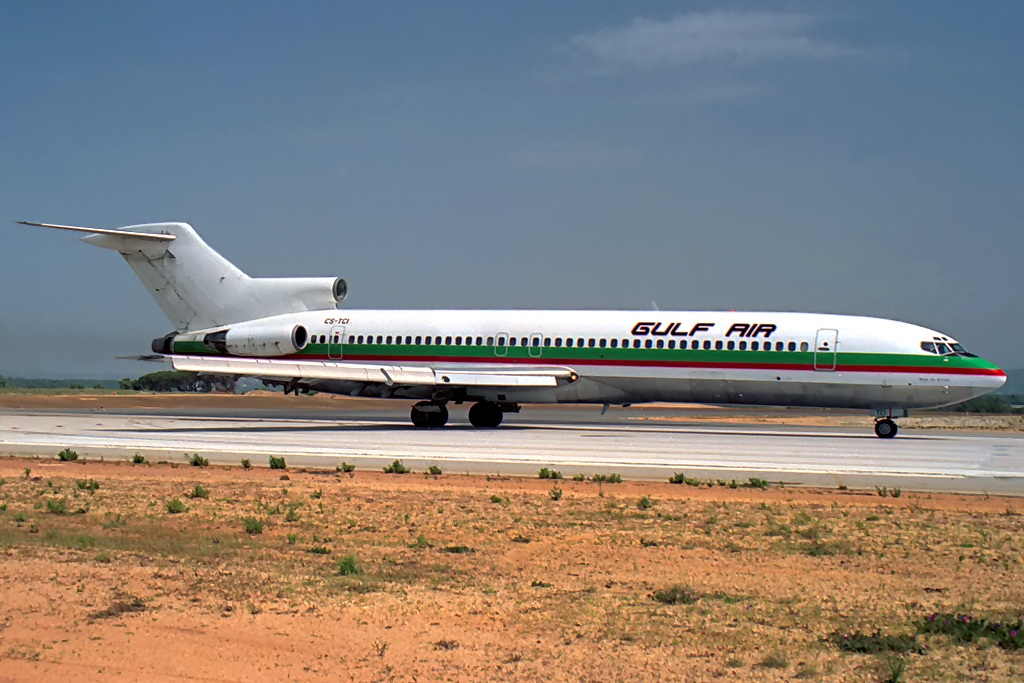
Gulf Air Transport Boeing 727-232(Adv)

Piston aircraft:

- 1 Convair 340 (N3416)
- 1 Convair 440 (N4816C)

Turboprop aircraft:

- 4 Convair 580 (N4801C, N511CA, N7530U, N9067R)
- 1 Lockheed L-188 Electra (N8355C)

Jet aircraft:

- 9 Boeing 727-100
- 3 Boeing 727-200
- 1 Douglas DC-8-61 (stretched Super DC-8) (N29U)
- 2 Douglas DC-8-63 (stretched Super DC-8) (N794AL) (N795AL)
- 1 Douglas DC-8-71 (stretched Super DC-8 re-engined with new high-bypass turbofan engines) (N8095U)

== See also ==
- List of defunct airlines of the United States
- Naval Air Station New Iberia: former military installation at the same airport
