= Acadiana Regional Airport =

- IATA: ARA; ICAO: KARA; FAA LID: ARA

Summary
- Airport type: Public
- Owner: Iberia Parish (managed by Iberia Parish Airport Authority)
- Location: New Iberia, Louisiana
- Elevation AMSL: 24 ft (7.3 m)
- Coordinates: 30°02′16″N 091°53′02″W
- Website: iberiabiz.com, acadianaregionalairport.com
- Interactive map of Acadiana Regional Airport

Runways
Direction	Length		Surface
Direction	ft	m	Surface
17/35	8,002	2,439	Concrete
17W/35W	5,000	1,524	Water

Statistics (2007)
- Aircraft operations: 95,851
- Based aircraft: 46
- Source: Federal Aviation Administration

Acadiana Regional Airport (IATA: ARA, ICAO: KARA, FAA LID: ARA) is a public use airport in Iberia Parish, Louisiana, United States. It is owned by Iberia Parish, managed by the Iberia Parish Airport Authority and is located four nautical miles (7 km) northwest of the central business district of New Iberia, Louisiana near U.S. 90 (future Interstate 49).

From 1960 to 1965 it was operated by the U.S. Navy as Naval Auxiliary Air Station New Iberia as an advanced flight training base with Training Squadron Twenty Seven (VT-27) as the principal assigned unit. VT-27 operated TS-2A Tracker aircraft, modified versions of the Grumman S-2 Tracker with antisubmarine warfare (ASW) equipment removed and converted for use as multi-piston engine trainers. NAAS New Iberia was closed in 1965 when VT-27 was reassigned to NAS Corpus Christi, Texas and control of the airfield reverted to the local civilian government.

== Facilities and aircraft ==
Acadiana Regional Airport (ARA) covers an area of 2,328 acres (942 ha) at an elevation of 24 feet (7 m) above mean sea level. It has one runway designated 17/35 which measures 8,002 by 200 feet (2,439 x 61 m). It also has one seaplane water runway landing area designated 17W/35W which measures 5,000 by 150 feet (1,524 x 46 m).

For the 12-month period ending January 31, 2007, the airport had 95,851 aircraft operations, an average of 262 per day: 58% general aviation and 32% air taxi, 10% military and <1% scheduled commercial. At that time there were 46 aircraft based at this airport: 46% single-engine, 15% multi-engine, 2% jet and 37% helicopter.

ARA serves as a helicopter flight training location for several companies and is also used on a regular basis by NASA, the U.S. Air Force and the U.S. Navy as a cross country flight training destination. Air Force T-1A Jayhawk (which is a military flight training version of the Hawker 400 business jet) and Navy T-45 Goshawk jet trainers are frequent visitors to the airfield while NASA T-38 Talon supersonic jet trainers visit the airport on occasion as well. In the past, U.S. Navy F/A-18 Hornet supersonic fighter-attack jets from VFA-204 based at the Naval Air Station Joint Reserve Base New Orleans also visited ARA on occasion on a repeated basis.

Two major aviation companies have been based at the airport: Aviation Exteriors Louisiana, Inc. (which did business as AvEx) and Bristow Helicopters, a division of the Bristow Group.

According to its website, AvEx had extensive experience painting commercial jetliners at its large hangar complex located on the airport, including Airbus A300, A310, A319 and A320 aircraft; Boeing 737-300, 737-400, 747-400, 757-200, 767-300, 777-200, 777-300, 787-8 and 787-9 aircraft; and McDonnell Douglas DC-10, MD-11, MD-80 and MD-90 aircraft. AvEx also lists Boeing and FedEx on its website as two of its major customers for aircraft painting services. A number of new 787 Dreamliners were painted by AvEx for Boeing during 2015 and 2016 at this facility prior to their delivery to airline customers.

U.S. based Bristow is a large, worldwide operator of helicopters for the offshore oil and gas industry, including in the nearby Gulf of Mexico. Bristow has operated AgustaWestland AW139, Bell 407, Sikorsky S-76 (S-76C+ and S-76C++ models) and Sikorsky S-92 helicopters with these rotorcraft types being maintained at its Gulf of Mexico operational headquarters located on the airport.

ARA was also the location of the former headquarters of Gulf Air Transport from 1979 to 1990. Gulf Air was a charter airline which operated jetliners such as the Boeing 727 (B727-100 and B727-200 models) and stretched Douglas DC-8 (Super DC-8-61, Super DC-8-63 and Super DC-8-71 models) as well as Convair 580 and Lockheed L-188 Electra turboprops among other aircraft types.

== See also ==
- List of airports in Louisiana
