= Express.Net Airlines =

American cargo airline

Express.Net Airlines Trans Continental Airlines
IATA	ICAO	Call sign
- TD	XNA; TCN	EXPRESSNET; TRANCON
- Founded: June 21, 1972 as Intl Airlines Academy
- Commenced operations: 1975 as Trans; Continental Airlines; 2000 as Express.Net Airlines
- Ceased operations: 2008; 18 years ago
- Operating bases: Detroit
- Fleet size: See Fleet
- Headquarters: Naples, Florida; Ypsilanti, Michigan; United States
- Key people: Scott Kalitta; Connie Kalitta
- Founder: Ronald Deane Melvin
- Employees: 270 (2007); 325 (1990)
- Website: ena.aero (archived as of 31 March 2007)

A300 at Seattle 2005

Express.Net Airlines was a cargo airline based in Naples, Florida, United States. It operated all-cargo charter and ACMI services in the United States and to Canada, Mexico, South America and the Far East from a headquarters at Naples Municipal Airport. The company originated as a pilot training academy as a spinoff from bankrupt Universal Airlines in 1972. Zantop International Airlines (ZIA) was simultaneously founded with overlapping ownership between the academy and ZIA. In 1975 the academy launched freight airline Trans Continental Airlines (TCA) based at Detroit Willow Run Airport. TCA filed for bankruptcy in 1990 after an attempt to fly passenger service. It was bought out of bankruptcy by drag-racer Connie Kalitta, who sold the company to his son, Scott, in 1994. Scott Kalitta sold the company in 1999, which was renamed Express.Net Airlines in 2000. Express.Net ceased operations in 2008.

A300 operating for Dragonair, Hong Kong 2004

TCA DC-8-62F Seattle 1999

TCA CV 340F Willow Run 1995

TCA DC-6A Willow Run 1993

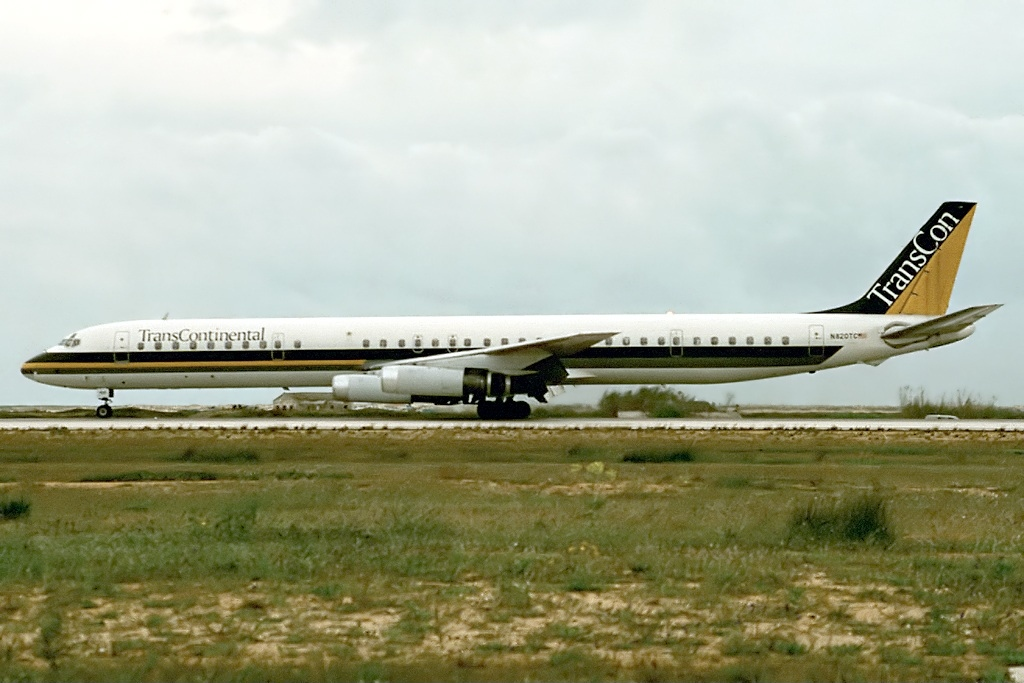
TCA DC-8-63 Faro 1989

== History ==
=== Melvin era ===
On 30 May 1972, following the end of operations and bankruptcy of Universal Airlines earlier that month, the State of Michigan received incorporation papers for Zantop International Airlines, for which Ronald Deane Melvin was a minor shareholder; incorporation was effective that day. Also on 30 May, Michigan received incorporation papers for International Airlines Academy. The Academy was a spinoff from the training group of Universal Airlines and its main shareholder was Melvin with the three Zantop brothers, Duane, Howard and Lloyd, as minor shareholders. Incorporation was effective 21 June. Melvin ran the company through its 1990 bankruptcy.

In 1975, the academy started airline operations under the name Trans Continental Airlines, initially a trade name, but by year-end 1976 the company adopted that as its name. TCA was a commercial operator, uncertificated by the Civil Aeronautics Board (CAB), the now-defunct federal agency that, at the time, provided strict economic regulation of most US air transport, and was thus limited to contract flying only. In May 1979, following 1977 US air cargo deregulation, the CAB certificated TCA as a freight airline, noting it had been "engaged in the private carriage of automotive parts for the 'Big Three' auto companies."

In May 1989, TCA acquired 254-seat Douglas DC-8-63 passenger aircraft, which it used for passenger charters, but also limited scheduled service, e.g. twice a week Las Vegas to Honolulu starting 1990. Until that time, it had remained a freight carrier, with auto-manufacturing accounting for 75% of its business. However, passenger traffic had grown to become 40% of its revenue. But in October the airline declared Chapter 11 bankruptcy and returned the passenger aircraft, reverting to a pure cargo airline. The airline environment was poor, with high fuel prices and low automotive and passenger demand (Iraq had invaded Kuwait in August)).

=== After Melvin ===
Drag racer Connie Kalitta, who at that time owned American International Airways and several related businesses, rescued TCA from bankruptcy and in 1994 sold it to his son, Scott Kalitta, at which time TCA had only two aircraft. In early 1999 TCA was purchased from Scott Kalitta by David Clark and Michael Goldberg. In 2000 the name of the company changed to Express.Net Airlines. The airline has not been in operation since 2008.

== Fleet ==
TCA at year-end 1975:

- 5 Curtiss C-46

World Airline Fleets 1979 (copyright 1979) shows TCA with:

- 7 Curtiss C-46F/D
- 8 Douglas DC-6A/BF

TCA at May 1989:

- 3 Convair 440F
- 4 Douglas DC-6A/BF
- 6 Douglas DC-8-54/55F
- 1 Douglas DC-8-63 + 1 commitment

Express.Net at March 2007:

- 9 Airbus A300B4-200F
- 1 Boeing 727-100F
- 5 Boeing 727-200F

=== Previously operated ===
At August 2009 the airline also operated:

- 5 DC-8
- 2 Boeing 727-200
- 2 Boeing 727-200F

== See also ==
- List of defunct airlines of the United States
- Universal Airlines (United States)
- Zantop International Airlines
