= VT-27 =

Training Squadron 27
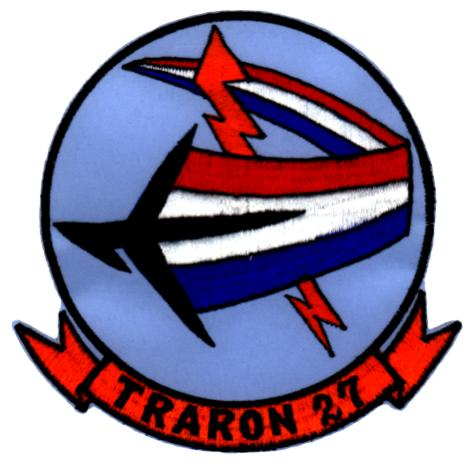
- VT-27 squadron insignia
- Active: 11 July 1951–present
- Country: United States
- Branch: United States Navy
- Role: Training

VT-27 is a primary training squadron of the United States Navy. One of just five Navy primary training squadrons, VT-27 is one of two located on the Texas Coastal Bend.

== History ==
Training Squadron 27 was initially established on 11 July 1951 as Advanced Training Unit-B at Naval Air Station, Corpus Christi. The command moved to Naval Air Station, Kingsville in 1952 and again to Naval Air Station, New Iberia, Louisiana in 1960. It was there the squadron was redesignated VT-27 in July of that year and about that time that the Grumman S2F-1T Tracker was put into service as a multi-engine trainer. In September 1962 the 1962 United States Tri-Service aircraft designation system changed the Tracker's designation to TS-2A. In July 1964, the "Boomers" were returned to Naval Air Station, Corpus Christi where they continue to be an important part of the community.

In 1973, the squadron began a transition to the role of a primary training squadron with the arrival on 1 August of the first T-28B Trojan. By 1 October 1973, the last Grumman TS-2A Tracker had departed, signifying the end of the advanced training role and the completion of the transition to primary training. In August 1983, the squadron took delivery of the first T-34C Turbo Mentor aircraft. From March 1984, when the last T-28B ever used for naval flight training departed, to June 2013, the T-34C was the mainstay of the Navy and Marine Corps primary flight training program. In June 2013 VT-27 transitioned from T-34C to the T-6B Texan II. The "Boomers" average well over 11,000 training missions a year, and more than 70 sorties per training day.

== Squadron aircraft ==
- S2F-1T / TS-2A Tracker
- T-28B Trojan
- T-34C Turbo Mentor
- T-6B Texan II

== Squadron bases ==
- Naval Air Station Corpus Christi, Texas
- Naval Air Station Kingsville, Texas
- Naval Air Station New Iberia, Louisiana

== Training wing ==
- Training Air Wing Four, Corpus Christi, Texas

== See also ==
- History of the United States Navy
- List of United States Navy aircraft squadrons
- List of inactive United States Navy aircraft squadrons
