= Naval Air Station New Iberia =

Coordinates: 30.0378°N 91.8839°W

Naval Air Station New Iberia, located near New Iberia, Louisiana, was a short-lived training facility of the United States Navy which operated for a mere five years in the 1960s. The naval base at New Iberia was actually designated NAAS, indicating that it was a Naval Auxiliary Air Station. The U.S. Navy airfield identifier for New Iberia was KNIL.

== History ==
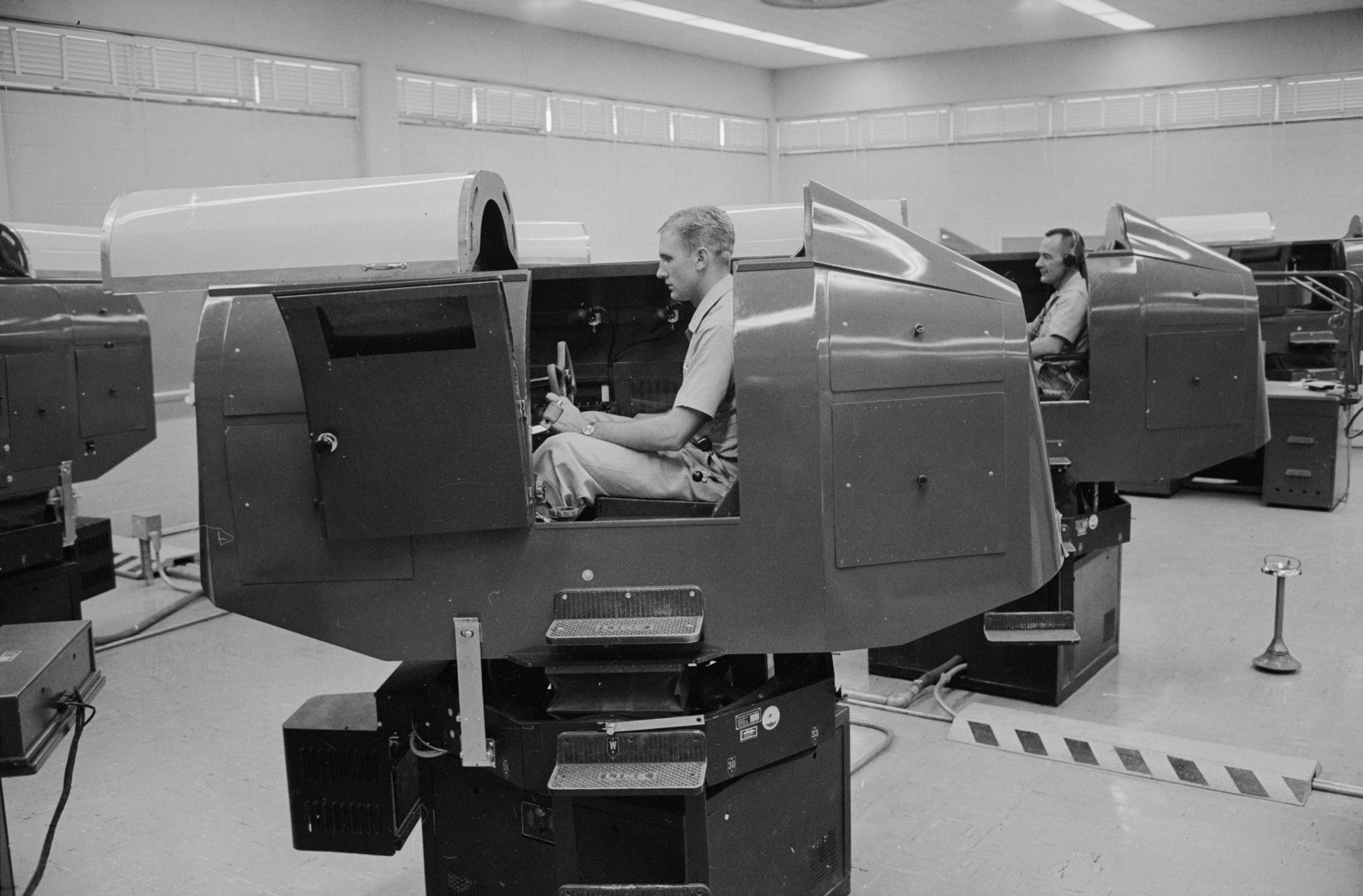
Flight simulators at New Iberia, 1964

The site of NAAS New Iberia had served as a civil airport between 1946 and 1954. In 1954 the Department of Defense selected the airport for development as a naval air station.

Due to the runway length requirements of naval jet aircraft, 4,000 acres were purchased by the Federal Government and an 8,002-foot concrete runway, Runway 16/34, was constructed. Commissioned in 1960, Naval Auxiliary Air Station New Iberia was located near U.S. Highway 90 just outside New Iberia and covered an area of 4,347 acres of land and had an elevation of 24 feet.

With the opening of NAAS New Iberia, its primary flying unit, Advanced Training Unit-B moved from Naval Air Station Kingsville/South Field, Texas and was redesignated as Training Squadron TWENTY SEVEN (VT-27). Operating Grumman TS-2A Trackers, the squadron conducted advanced multiengine training for Student Naval Aviators destined for carrier-based A-1 Skyraider, S-2 Tracker and E-1 Tracer aircraft, and land-based naval aircraft and seaplanes, primarily those engaged in airborne early warning mission flying the EC-121 Warning Star, and those in the patrol and anti-submarine warfare mission, such as the P-2 Neptune, P5M Marlin, and the new P-3 Orion that began coming on line in the early 1960s.

Approximately 1,000 military personnel and 100 civilian workers were stationed at NAAS New Iberia in 1964, including those assigned to VT-27. Naval Auxiliary Air Station New Iberia continued to function until 1964 when the Navy began closing the facility. On 29 September 1964, VT-27 transferred to Naval Air Station Corpus Christi, Texas, with the squadron instructor pilots flying out the TS-2 Trackers. NAS New Iberia was finally closed in January 1965.

Upon the closure of the naval field, the Iberia Parish governing body petitioned the U.S. government for release of 2,100 acres of air station property for civil aviation use. The petition was granted in 1970 and the airport was given its present name, Acadiana Regional Airport. The Acadiana Regional Airport is classified as a General Aviation Transport airport by the Federal Aviation Authority. By definition, the airport is capable of serving all classes of aircraft.

A variety of aviation-related businesses are located at the airport. Many helicopters and seaplanes utilize the airport in support of the offshore petroleum industry in the Gulf of Mexico. Commercial passenger service is provided by a number of charter operators at the airport.

== See also ==
- Acadiana Regional Airport: former airline at the same airport
