= Trans-Florida Airlines =

Airline based in Florida

- Convair 240 New York LaGuardia 1988
IATA	ICAO	Call sign
-	TFA	TRANS FLORIDA
- Founded: 1966; 60 years ago
- Ceased operations: 2006; 20 years ago
- Hubs: Daytona Beach International Airport
- Fleet size: 2
- Headquarters: Daytona Beach, Florida, USA
- Key people: Robert Willman

Trans-Florida Airlines was an American airline based in Daytona Beach, Florida, USA. It was established and started operations in 1966 and operated passenger and cargo charters until 2020.

== History ==
The airline was established in 1962 as Daytona Aviation, based at what was known as Daytona Beach Regional Airport. The airport has since been renamed to Daytona Beach International Airport. They received Part 121 airline operation status in 1966 and developed a fleet of five Douglas DC-3 aircraft. In May 1972, two Lockheed Model 49 Constellation aircraft were added and operated until 1976. During this time, a Vickers Viscount 745D was acquired, but was too expensive to operate and was sold off as scrap. The DC-3 fleet was sold off one at a time. In 1977 the airline purchased its first Convair and eventually increased its fleet to eight, two of which were operated as passenger airliners as late as 1993.

== Incidents and accidents ==
- 1 June 1998 - Trans-Florida Airlines Convair 240-17 (N87949) was written off at Borinquen Field, Puerto Rico, when gear up was selected during a touch-and-go landing instead of full flaps. As a result, the aircraft settled onto the runway and skidded. There were no injuries.
- 24 September 1998 - Trans-Florida Airlines Convair 240-13 (N91237) when taking off from Luis Muñoz Marín International Airport had an engine problem. It attempted to return to the airport, but lost altitude and was force landed in a saltwater lagoon some 2 miles short of the runway. The aircraft was written off, but the two crew and one passenger were uninjured.

== Fleet ==
As of January 2005, the Trans-Florida Airlines fleet included:

Trans-Florida Airlines Fleet
Aircraft	In Fleet	Notes
Convair 240	2	
Total	2	

=== Previously operated ===
Aircraft previously operated by Trans-Florida Airlines include:

Historic Trans-Florida Airlines Fleet
Aircraft	In Fleet	Notes
Douglas DC-3	5	
Lockheed Model 49 Constellation	2	
Vickers Viscount 745D	1	
Total	7	

== See also ==
- Air transportation in the United States
- List of defunct airlines of the United States
