= Empire Airways =

Airline based Farmingdale, New York that closed in 2012

IATA	ICAO	Call sign
—	JKR	JOKER
- Founded: 2004; 21 years ago
- Ceased operations: 2012; 13 years ago
- Hubs: Republic Airport
- Fleet size: 2
- Parent company: Partner Aviation Enterprises
- Headquarters: Farmingdale, New York, United States
- Website: EmpireAirways.com

Empire Airways was an airline based in Farmingdale, New York, United States. It operated fixed-wing and helicopter charter services, as well as VIP, corporate shuttle, air ambulance and aircraft maintenance services. Its main base was Republic Airport.

== History ==
The airline was established in July 2004 and plans to operate scheduled services from its base to Atlantic City for hotels and casinos. It was wholly owned by Partner Aviation Enterprises. In 2012 they closed their doors following hurricane Sandy.

== Fleet ==
The Empire Airways fleet included the following aircraft (at June 2009):

- 2 × BAe Jetstream 31

Fleet included the following aircraft (at January 2009):

- BAe Jetstream 31
- Citation II
- Citation III
- Eurocopter AS355
- Bell 206A Jet Ranger
- Bell 206L Long Ranger
- Sikorsky S-76A
- Sikorsky S-92

== See also ==
- List of defunct airlines of the United States
