= Kamaka Air =

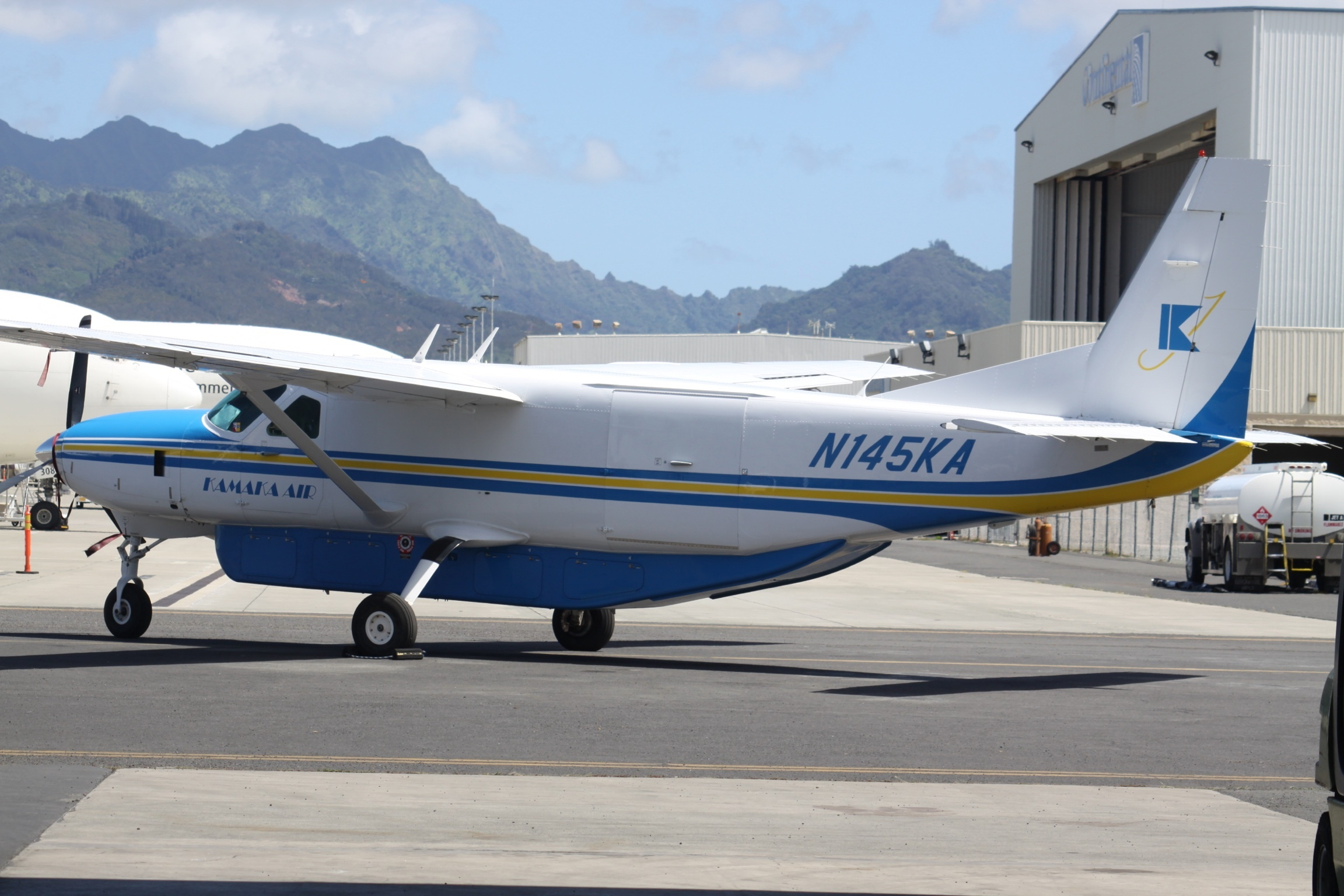
IATA	ICAO	Call sign
-	-	-
- Founded: 1993
- Hubs: Honolulu
- Fleet size: 9
- Destinations: 7
- Parent company: RLG Capital and Trinity Private Equity Group (80%)
- Employees: 50 to 200
- Website: kamakaair.com

Kamaka Air is a US based cargo and charter airline based out of Hawaii founded in 1993. It is a Part 135 carrier.

== History ==
Kamaka Air was founded in 1993 as a local airline across the Hawaiian islands. In 2003 they took over Genavco Air Cargo.

In 2021 a Cessna 208 crashed, in February 2022 80% of their stock was bought by RLG Capital and Trinity Private Equity Group, in 2024 they halted services to Molokai and Lanai and went through a management change.

Kamaka Air also in 2023 provided aid to Maui amid a crisis. On February 1, 2023, they took their first Cessna 408 to their leasing arm.

They also had to temporarily halted fights after it failed to complete key jobs.In 2024 CEO David Hinderland talked about a conservative growth plan particularly stating it had plans for more aircraft, but did not explain further.

It has also has no plans to expand to the US mainland. In June 2024 it was reported that Kamaka Air resumed service after staffing issues.

In June 2024 its management director quit leading which caused a grounding. On December 18, 2024, Kamaka Air faced a lawsuit with its former owner. In June 2025 Kamaka Air received its second passenger aircraft. On October 23 2025 Kamaka Air partnered with a veterinary. In March of 2026 the airline began relief flights.

== Fleet ==
=== Current ===
Cessna Caravan

Cessna 408

=== Historic ===
DC 3

Beech 18

Cessna 207
