= Heartland Airlines =

IATA	ICAO	Call sign
N/A	N/A	N/A
- Founded: 1998; 27 years ago
- Hubs: Dayton International Airport
- Fleet size: 0
- Destinations: N/A
- Parent company: Heartland Airlines LLC
- Headquarters: Dayton, Ohio
- Key people: Bill Howard (CEO)
- Website: N/A

Heartland Airlines is a defunct airline that planned to fly out of Dayton International Airport in Dayton, Ohio, United States. While the airline existed for three years, no flights ever took place and no planes were ever purchased.

== History ==
The airline was created in 1998 by David Lightle of Tipp City, Ohio. Plans were to cater to business travelers, offering amenities such as plush leather seating and dinner served on real china. The airline would travel to other business centers in the Midwest region. Heartland announced they would cease operations on February 9, 2001, however, after failing to raise enough funds from investors.

== Funding problems ==
The first round of fundraising started in 1999, and collected $6 million in about one year. A second round of funding began shortly thereafter, with the goal of $55 million. This proved problematic for Heartland, though, which was only able to raise $35 million from local investors. Last-minute efforts to raise enough capital included securing a $10 million loan from the Ohio state legislature, but all measures failed. With no way to continue operations, Heartland Airlines returned all $35 million to their investors.

== See also ==
- List of defunct airlines of the United States
