= Sky Trek International Air Lines =

Airline in Virginia, US

IATA	ICAO	Call sign
1L	PZR	PHAZER
- Commenced operations: 1997; 29 years ago
- Ceased operations: 2000; 26 years ago
- Fleet size: 5 Boeing 727-200
- Headquarters: Richmond, Virginia, then Ewing Township, New Jersey. United States
- Key people: Robert Iverson (President/CEO - 1996-1999), Harris Herman (President/CEO - 1999-2000)

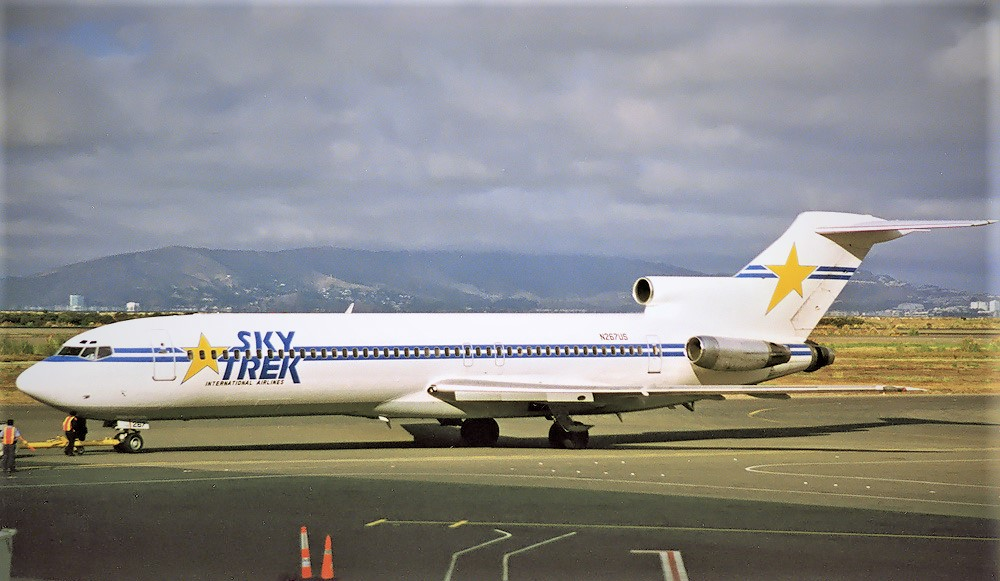
Sky Trek 727-200 in 1997 at Oakland International Airport

Sky Trek International Air Lines was a Federal Air Regulation Part 121 Supplemental Charter Airline operationally headquartered originally in Richmond, Virginia, and later Ewing Township, New Jersey. It operated from 1997 to 2000, when it declared bankruptcy and ceased operations.

== History ==
Their fleet consisted of up to 5 Boeing 727-200s configured for 162 passengers, and operated on behalf of package vacation charter companies and large ad hoc charter brokers. The entity was registered as a Virginia Corporation in 1996.

Principal customers included Apple Vacations, Go Go Tours, Liberty Travel, and World Technologies. Sky Trek flew charters primarily to the Caribbean, including Nassau, Aruba, Saint Martin, and Antigua. Other destinations included Cancún, Mexico and Laughlin, Nevada. Ad hoc charters provided short notification lift during the NCAA basketball tournament and subservice to other airlines.

Sky Trek's refurbished aircraft were leased primarily from Pegasus and maintained according to the Boeing Maintenance Document. Pilots were primarily from Eastern Air Lines via KIWI International Air Lines. Utilization of the aircraft averaged slightly above 200 hours per month per aircraft.

According to the DOT/Bureau of Transportation Statistics, Air Carrier Financials: Schedule P-1.1's filed by Sky Trek, the carrier lost nearly $8 million under its first President Robert Iverson II, who had previously been removed as President of Kiwi International Air Lines. Sky Trek never had a positive yearly net income.

In August 1999, Sky Trek International's Board of Directors elected Harris Herman President/CEO to replace Iverson who resigned. Herman had previously served as President/COO of the Pan Am Shuttle. The DBA name of the carrier was changed to Discovery Airlines. The Sky Trek' aircraft were removed from service and repainted in the Discovery livery. However, Herman was not able to make the carrier profitable and Sky Trek eventually declared bankruptcy and ceased operations less than 9 months later in May 2000 when it filed for reorganization under Chapter 11 of the Bankruptcy Act. This reorganization was converted to a Chapter 7 liquidation on June 22, 2000.

During its tenure, Sky Trek had an incident where one of its Boeing 727 cockpit windshields shattered mid flight. The flight from Lynden Pindling International Airport to Newark Liberty International Airport was diverted to Jacksonville International Airport.

== See also ==
- List of defunct airlines of the United States
