= Greenville Municipal Airport (Michigan) =

Airport in Michigan, United States

- IATA: none; ICAO: none; FAA LID: 6D6

Summary
- Airport type: Public
- Owner: City of Greenville
- Serves: Greenville, Michigan
- Elevation AMSL: 855 ft (261 m)
- Coordinates: 43°08′32″N 085°15′14″W

Map
- Location of airport in Michigan 6D6 (the United States)

Runways
Direction	Length		Surface
Direction	ft	m	Surface
10/28	4,199	1,280	Asphalt
18/36	1,730	527	Turf

Statistics (2020)
- Aircraft operations: 5,100
- Based aircraft: 42
- Source: Federal Aviation Administration

Greenville Municipal Airport (FAA LID: 6D6) is a city-owned, public-use airport located three nautical miles (6 km) south of the central business district of Greenville, a city in Montcalm County, Michigan, United States. It is included in the Federal Aviation Administration (FAA) National Plan of Integrated Airport Systems for 2017–2021, in which it is categorized as a local general aviation facility.

== History ==
The airport was sued in 1959 by a black man denied entry at the white seating area at the airport the previous year.

In 2022, a plan was released to update the airport's layout, last updated in 1996. This new layout would make the airport eligible for grant money from state and federal governments, thus making it easier to upgrade and expand the airport's facilities. The airport hopes to work on expanding its facilities, a process that would also require an expansion of non-aviation facilities such as additional roads nearby the airport.

== Facilities and aircraft ==
Greenville Municipal Airport covers an area of 135 acres (55 ha) at an elevation of 855 feet (261 m) above mean sea level. It has two runways: 10/28 is 4,199 by 75 feet (1,280 x 23 m) with an asphalt surface and 18/36 is 1,730 by 200 feet (527 x 61 m) with a turf surface.

The airport has two FBOs that sell fuel. A restaurant was opened next to the airport's runway opened in 2021.

For the 12-month period ending December 31, 2020, the airport had 5,100 aircraft operations, an average of 13 per day: 98% general aviation and 2% military. At that time there were 42 aircraft based at this airport, all single-engine airplanes.

== Accidents and incidents ==
- On September 20, 1994, a Piper PA-20 impacted terrain after departure from Greenville. The probable cause was found to be incapacitation of the pilot due to a seizure and/or loss of consciousness.
- On September 8, 1995, a Cessna 188 impacted trees and caught fire after departure from Greenville. Witnesses report the aircraft's engine was running inconsistently. The aircraft skilled treetops while trying to climb, and a fuel leak was discovered after the crash. An autopsy revealed the pilot had arteriolonephrosclerosis, a hardening of the arteries in the kidney, which may have caused an arhythmia which might have caused the deceased to lose consciousness and thus lose control of the aircraft; a drug that is a derivative of propoxyphene was found in the pilot's urine. Thus, the probable cause of the crash was found to be pilot incapacitation.
- On September 7, 2003, a Cessna 172G Skyhawk impacted terrain after takeoff from Greenville. The pilot departed with 20° of flaps and, after rotation, remained in ground effect to gain airspeed. The aircraft began to stall, so the pilot lowered the nose to regain more airspeed, at which point the aircraft impacted terrain at the end of the runway. The probable cause was found to be the pilot's inadequate takeoff procedure with the use of 20 degrees of flaps.
- On August 25, 2008, a Cirrus SR20 operated by Western Michigan University collided with a deer during takeoff from Greenville Airport. The pilot was not injured, but the aircraft sustained substantial damage to the left wing. The pilot had flown in from Battle Creek and was planning on doing one night touch-and-go landing, and just as he was rotating, he saw the deer run across the runway. There was a loud bang and the pilot believed he hit a second deer, but he did not have enough runway left to stop. The pilot returned to land. The aircraft reportedly handled well until short final, at which point the left wing dropped and the left main contacted the runway first. The aircraft landed normally and was able to turn off the runway and shut down the airplane. The probable cause of the accident was found to be impact with the deer that ran onto the runway.
- On September 11, 2016, a Piper PA-18 Super Cub was substantially damaged after impacting terrain after departing from Greenville Municipal Airport. The pilot turned on course after reaching an altitude sufficient to clear trees south of the airport. During the turn, the pilot turned to avoid trees and stalled. Though he recovered, the pilot entered a secondary stall while attempting to continue maneuvering away, descended, and impacted terrain.

== See also ==
- List of airports in Michigan
