= Greenville Municipal Airport (Maine) =

- IATA: none; ICAO: none; FAA LID: 3B1

Summary
- Airport type: Public
- Owner: Town of Greenville
- Serves: Greenville, Maine
- Elevation AMSL: 1,401 ft (427 m)
- Coordinates: 45°27′47″N 069°33′06″W
- Interactive map of Greenville Municipal Airport

Runways
Direction	Length		Surface
Direction	ft	m	Surface
14/32	3,999	1,219	Asphalt
3/21	3,000	914	Asphalt

Statistics (2006)
- Aircraft operations: 5,800
- Source: Federal Aviation Administration

Greenville Municipal Airport (FAA LID: 3B1) is a public airport located two miles (3 km) east of the central business district of Greenville, a town in Piscataquis County, Maine, United States. It is owned by the Town of Greenville.

== Facilities and aircraft ==
Greenville Municipal Airport covers an area of 241 acres (98 ha) which contains two asphalt paved runways: 14/32 measuring 3,999 x 75 ft (1,219 x 23 m) and 3/21 measuring 3,000 x 75 ft (914 x 23 m). For the 12-month period ending August 24, 2006, the airport had 5,800 general aviation aircraft operations, an average of 15 per day., the airport also plays a big part in the annual Greenville International Seaplane Fly-In. Many ceremonies, activities, and banquets are held at the airport during the fly-in week. Although most flyover and competition aircraft stage at Stobie Seaplane Base on nearby Moosehead Lake, many local and international pilots attending the show who fly conventional landing gear usually land at the Greenville Airport, during one week every September the airport becomes much busier than usual. A number of floatplanes also arrive at the airport as well once parking locations at Stobie Seaplane Base and Folsom's Seaplane Base have been filled. Due to the number of aircraft, showcasers and organizations that arrive from foreign countries during the fly-in week the airport is sometimes referred to as Greenville International Airport. Commonly seen aircraft at the airport during the fly-in include Cessna 150s, 170s, 172s, 180s, 182s, 185s, 206s, and 210s, twin engine Cessna 310s and 402s, Piper J-3 Cubs, Piper Cherokees, Piper Warriors, Republic SeaBee's, Lake Amphibious aircraft, and De Havilland Beavers. Many larger business aircraft and charter flights also arrive during the fly-in including Cessna Caravans, and King Air turboprop aircraft, as well as Dasault Falcons, and Gulfstream jets. Also vintage aircraft utilize the airport during the fly-in either because the aircraft owners are attending the show or for showcase reasons, rare aircraft that have arrived in the past include Cessna 195s, Wacos, Stearman Bi-planes, AT-6 Texans, Ryan Navions, Grumman Albatross amphibious aircraft and the one time appearance of the worlds sole flying Sikorsky S-39 1930s era flying boat that performed at the fly in during 2009. Greenville used to be the base for the only Douglas DC-3 fitted with floats before the floats were removed in 2006. The aircraft itself still remains at the airport, but haven't flown in over 5 years and remains somewhat of a "display".

== See also ==
- List of airports in Maine
