= Greenville Municipal Airport (Pennsylvania) =

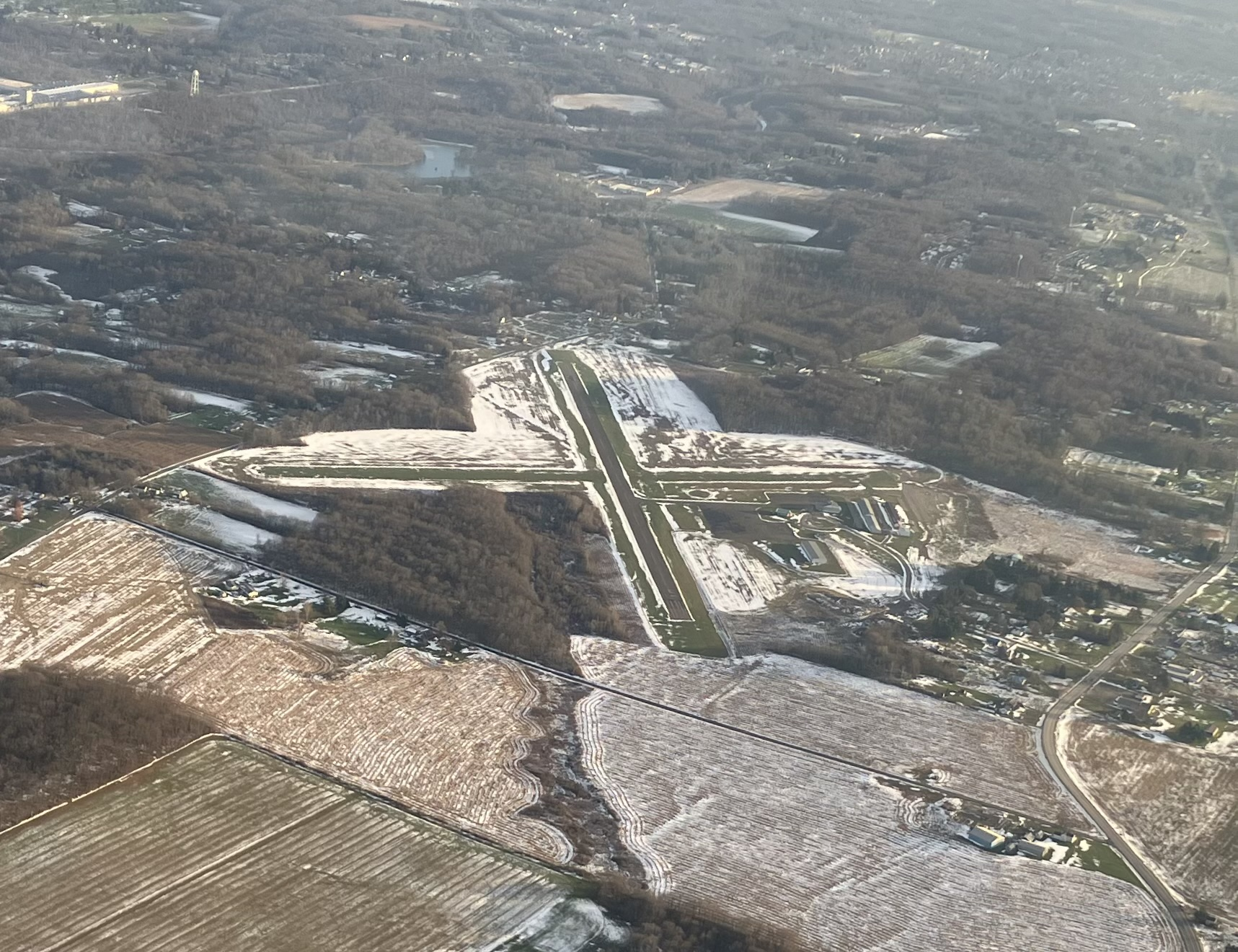
- IATA: none; ICAO: none; FAA LID: 4G1

Summary
- Airport type: Public
- Owner: Borough of Greenville
- Serves: Greenville, Pennsylvania
- Elevation AMSL: 1,202 ft (366 m)
- Coordinates: 41°26′49″N 080°23′29″W

Maps
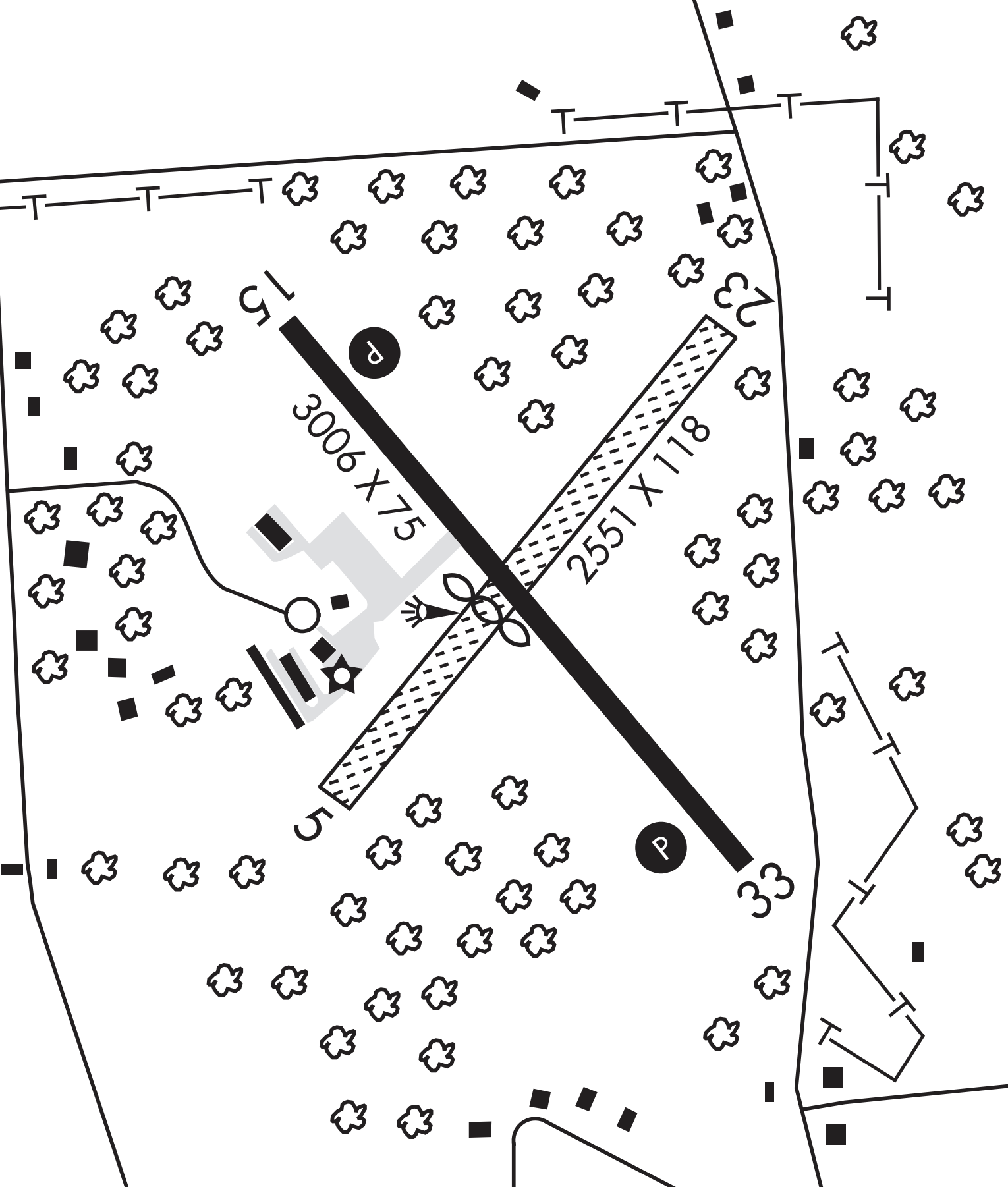

- Location of airport in Pennsylvania 4G1 (the United States)

Runways
| Direction | Length | | Surface |
| Direction | ft | m | Surface |
|---|---|---|---|
| 15/33 | 2,703 | 824 | Asphalt |
| 5/23 | 2,551 | 778 | Turf |

Statistics (2011)
- Aircraft operations: 17,700
- Based aircraft: 21
- Source: Federal Aviation Administration

The Greenville Municipal Airport (FAA LID: 4G1) is a public use airport which is located three nautical miles (6 km) north of the central business district of Greenville, a borough in Mercer County, Pennsylvania, United States. It is owned by the Borough of Greenville.

This airport is included in the National Plan of Integrated Airport Systems for 2011–2015, which categorized it as a general aviation facility.

== Facilities and aircraft ==
The Greenville Municipal Airport covers an area of 166 acres (67 ha) at an elevation of 1,202 feet (366 m) above mean sea level. It has two runways: 15/33 is 2,703 by 75 feet (824 x 23 m) with an asphalt surface and 5/23 is 2,551 by 118 feet (778 x 36 m) with a turf surface.

For the twelve-month period ending October 31, 2011, the airport had 17,700 general aviation aircraft operations, an average of 48 per day. At that time, there were 21 aircraft based at this airport: 90.5% single-engine and 9.5% helicopter.

== See also ==
- List of airports in Pennsylvania
