= List of defunct airlines of the United States (Q–Z) =

The following is a list of defunct airlines of the United States. However, some of these airlines have ceased operations completely, changed identities and/or FAA certificates and are still operating under a different name (e.g. America West Airlines changed to use the identity of US Airways in 2005 – which itself also changed identity to American Airlines in 2015).

For reasons of size, this article is broken into four parts:

- List of defunct airlines of the United States (A–C)
- List of defunct airlines of the United States (D–I)
- List of defunct airlines of the United States (J–P)
- List of defunct airlines of the United States (Q–Z)

Airline	State or territory	Image	IATA	ICAO	Callsign	Hubs and focus cities	Commenced operations	Ceased operations	Notes
Q
Quaker City Airways	California					Burbank	1948	1961	Supplemental air carrier. Renamed Admiral Airways. Operated Boeing 307 Stratoliner
Queen City Flying Service	Ohio					Cincinnati/Northern Kentucky	1940	1970	Operated Beech 18, C-45 Expeditor
Quicktrans	Virginia					Norfolk	1950	1994	Navy cargo virtual airline
R
Ram Air Freight	North Carolina			REX	RAM EXPRESS	Raleigh Durham	1982	2008	Operated Grumman Cheetah, Piper Seneca, Piper PA-32
Ramp 66	South Carolina			PPK		North Myrtle Beach	1991	1994	Operated Beech Baron, Beech Bonanza, Cessna 402
Ranger Airlines	Texas					El Paso	1968	1970	Scheduled third-level services
Rankin Flying Service	Oregon					Swan Island	1927	n/a	Founded by Tex Rankin
Ransome Airlines	Pennsylvania		RZ			Northeast Philadelphia	1967	1995	Feeder flights for Allegheny Commuter (1970–1982), Delta Connection (1984–1987), Pan Am Express (1987–1991) and Trans World Express (1991–1995)
Rapid Air							1965	2006	Cargo operator. Known as Sparta Aviation Service
Rapid Air Lines	South Dakota					Rapid City	1930	1933	Merged with Hanford Airlines to form Hanford-Rapid Airlines
Rapid City Airlines	South Dakota					Rapid City	1928	1929	Established as Pioneer Airways. Operated Curtiss Jenny
Raritan Valley Air	New Jersey					Manville	1966	1968	Operated Beech 18, Beech Baron, Piper Apache
Rasmark Jet Charter	Texas					El Paso	1984	2000	Operated Learjet 25, Falcon 20
Raven Air	Alaska					Anchorage	1987	1992	Operated Cessna aircraft
Ravn Alaska	Alaska		7H	RVF	RAVN FLIGHT	Anchorage	2014 (traceable to 1948)	2025	Shutdown due to travel disruptions caused by the COVID-19 pandemic,
Ray Petersen Flying Service	Alaska					Bethel	1937	1945	Acquired Bristol Bay Air Service and Jim Dodson Air Service
RCR Air	North Carolina					Lexington	2007	2014	Operated Embraer ERJ 145
Reading Aviation Service	Pennsylvania					Reading	1966	1966	Operated de Havilland Dove, Beech D18S
Rectrix Aviation	Massachusetts					Nantucket	2005	2019	
Red Arrow Flying Service	Florida					Miami	1917	1919	Renamed Chalk's Flying Service; Operated Stinson Voyager with floats
Red Baron Airlines	Florida					Palm Beach	1979	1980	Renamed Florida Commuter Airlines
Red Carpet Airlines	Florida			RED		Clearwater	1978	1981	Renamed Aerosun International. Operated Convair 340, DC-3
Red Dodge Aviation	Alaska					Anchorage	1969	1972	uncertificated carrier flying Lockheed L-100 Hercules. Subsidiary of Flying W Airways
Red Way	Nebraska					Lincoln	2023	2023	Virtual airline
Red Wing Flying Service	Massachusetts					Ware	1929	1929	Air taxi
Rediske Air	Alaska					Soldotna	1991	2017	
Redline Air Charters	Alaska					Ruby	1996	2010	
Reeve Aleutian Airways	Alaska		RV	RVV	REEVE	Anchorage	1932	2001	
Regent Air	California		4R			Los Angeles	1983	1986	Super luxury 727 operator between New York and Los Angeles
Regina Cargo Airlines	Florida					Miami	1948	1960	Supplemental air carrier changed its name to Imperial Airlines in 1960
RegionsAir	Tennessee		3C	CEA	CORP-X	Smyrna	1996	2007	
Reilly Air Service	California					Los Angeles	1968	1971	Operated Beech 18
Reliant Airlines	Michigan			RLT			1984	2002	
Reno Air	Nevada		QQ	ROA	RENO AIR	Reno–Tahoe	1992	1999	Merged into American Airlines
Reno Air Express	California					San Jose	1994	1995	
Renown Aviation	California		RG	RGS		Santa Maria	1980	2000	Established as Western Aircraft Salvage
Republic Airlines	Minnesota		RC	REP	REPUBLIC	Minneapolis–Saint Paul	1979	1986	Merged into Northwest Airlines
Resort Air	Missouri					St. Louis Lambert	1983	1989	Renamed Trans States Airlines. Operated Swearingen Metro
Resort Air	Rhode Island					Block Island	1990s	1990s	Charter carrier
Resort Air	Oregon					Sunriver	1992	1992	Scenic tours
Resort Airlines	North Carolina; Florida; District of Columbia		RA	RA		Pinehurst, North Carolina; New York City; Miami	1945	1960	Scheduled international carrier limited to "sky cruises"
Resort Airlines	Maryland					Baltimore–Washington	1982	1986	Operated Piper aircraft
Resort Airways	Hawaii					Honolulu	1960	1971	Absorbed by HATS Hawaiian Air Tour Service. Operated Aero Commander 500
Resort Commuter	California					Orange County	1988	1995	Operated Convair 580
Resort Commuter Airlines	South Carolina						1975	1979	Renamed Mid-South Airlines
Resort Commuter Airlines	California		XK			Orange County	1984	1989	Established as Catalina Commuter
Rhoades International	Indiana			RDS		Columbus	1989	2006	Renamed Rhoades Aviation. Operated Convair C-131, Convair 240, DC-3, Douglas DC-6
Rich International Airways	Florida		JN	RIA	RICHAIR	Miami	1970	1996	
Richmond Aviation	Virginia					Richmond	1963	1971	Operated Piper Twin Comanche, Twin Bonanza, Mitsubishi MU-2
Riddle Airlines	Florida		RD	RD	RIDDLE	Miami	1952	1964	Rebranded from Riddle Aviation, rebranded to Airlift International
Riddle Aviation Company	Florida					Miami	1945	1952	Original name of Riddle Airlines
Rio Airways	Texas		XO	REO	RIO	Skylark Field	1967	1986	Began as Hood Airlines
Rio Grande Air							1999	2003	Cessna Caravan operator
RKO General	Massachusetts						1968	1970	Helicopter air taxi. Operated Bell 47, Bell 206
Robertson Aircraft Corporation	Missouri					Lambert Field	1925	1929	
Robin Airlines	California					Long Beach	1950	1951	Renamed North Continent Airlines
Robinson Airlines	New York					Ithaca	1945	1952	Renamed Mohawk Airlines
Roblex Aviation	Puerto Rico			ROX		San Juan	1997	2013	Cargo operator
Rochester Aviation	Minnesota					Rochester	1969	1971	Operated Cessna 206
Rockford Air Charter	Illinois					Chicago Rockford	1964	1971	Operated Cessna 206, Beech 18, Piper Twin Comanche
Rocky Mountain Airways	Colorado		JC	RMA	ROCKY MOUNTAIN	Denver Stapleton	1965	1991	Began as Vail Airways. Merged into Continental Express
Rogers Heavy Lift Helicopters	California					Fresno Yosemite	1994	1998	Operated Sikorsky CH-54 Tarhe
Roscoe Turner Aeronautical Corporation	Georgia					Candler Field	1925	1928	Operated Sikorsky S-29-A
Rose Aviation	California					Hawthorne	1968	1969	Operated Piper Apache, Aero Commander 500
Rosenbalm Aviation	Michigan; Oregon		9R	RAX	ROSIE	Willow Run	1960	1991	DC-8 contract flyer for Emery & Burlington. Became Flagship Express Services
Roseswift Air Service	Michigan					Grand Rapids	1920	1920	Founded by Arthur Rosenthal and Thomas Swift. Operated Curtiss Jenny
Roswell Airlines	New Mexico					Roswell	1976	1981	Founded by Dick Callens. Operated Piper Seneca
Roust Airways	Alaska					Nome	1930	1935	Founded by Thomas Pedersen Roust
Royal Air	Missouri					Kansas City	1978	1980	Operated Embraer Bandeirante
Royal American Airlines	Arizona					Tucson	1977	1986	Operated Vickers Viscount
Royal American Airways				RLM			1981	1993	Operated Convair 240, Convair 600, Vickers Viscount
Royal Hawaiian Air Service	Hawaii		ZH				1971	1986	Established as Hawaii Wings in 1963. Operated Cessna 402C
Royal Hawaiian Airlines	Hawaii					Honolulu	1985	1986	
Royal West Airlines	Nevada					Las Vegas McCarran	1981	1982	Operated DC-3
Royal West Airlines	Colorado			RWE	ROYAL WEST	Colorado Springs	1981	1987	Merged with Aero West Airlines in 1982. Operated DC-3, BAe 146
Royal West Airlines	Nevada					Las Vegas McCarran	1986	1987	
Royal-Air	Arkansas					Goodwin Field	1982	1982	Established as Jamaire. Renamed Sunbelt Airlines
Royale Airlines	Louisiana		OQ	RAY	ROYALE AIR	New Orleans Armstrong	1968	1989	
Rugby Aviation	Washington					Seattle-Tacoma	2002	2007	Renamed Northwest Sky Ferry
Russia Jet Direct	Washington		RD	RYN		Seattle–Tacoma	2005	2005	
Ryan Air	Alaska					Anchorage	1979	1988	Established as Unalakleet Air Taxi. Renamed Arctic Transportation Services
Ryan Airline Company	California					San Diego	1925	1926	
Ryan Aviation	Kansas			RYN		Wichita	1977	1988	previously DeBoer Aviation; became PHH Air
Ryan International Airlines	Illinois; Kansas		RD	RYN	RYAN INTERNATIONAL	Chicago Rockford; Wichita	1989	2013	previously PHH Air and before that, Ryan Aviation
S
S.I. Airways	Texas					Amarillo	1974	1975	
S.S. Airways	Kansas					Amarillo	1972	1972	Renamed Century Airlines
S.S.W.	Texas					El Paso		1959	Supplemental air carrier shut by CAB in 1959 for stranding passengers due to lack of funds. dba Universal Airlines 1957–1959
Saber Aviation			SP	SBR			1978	1991	
Safeway Airlines	Alaska					Fairbanks	1964	1968	Operated Piper Apache, Piper Comanche, Cherokee Six
Sair	New York					Syracuse	1961	1999	
Salair	Alaska		8S	SIR		Anchorage	1980	1997	Operated DC-3, Convair 440. Renamed Air Alaska Cargo
Salmon Air	Idaho		S6	MBI		Boise	1968	2009	Merged into McCall Aviation
Samoa Air	American Samoa					Pago Pago	1987	2003	
Samoan Airlines	American Samoa		SX	SX		Pago Pago	1959	1960	CAB-certificated as an intl carrier.
San Diego Sky Freight	California					San Diego	1950	1952	Cargo operator
San Francisco and Oakland Helicopter Airlines	California		OH		SFO AIRLINES	San Francisco	1961	1986	
San Juan Airlines	Washington					Port Angeles	1947	1989	Commuter operator
San Juan Airlines			YS				1970	1989	Merged into Alaska Airlines
San Marino Taxi Aereo	California					Long Beach	1999	2003	
Santa Fe Airline Company	New Mexico					Santa Fe	1972	1972	Intrastate air carrier
Santa Fe Skyway							1946	1947	
Santa Maria Airlines	California					Hancock Field	1928	1935	Founded by George Allan Hancock
SAT-Air	Texas					San Antonio	1983	1995	Renamed Merlin Express
Satellite Aero	Wyoming					Jackson Hole	1990	1995	Operated Cessna 206, Cessna 402C, Piper Navajo
Saturn Airways	California		KS			Oakland	1960	1976	All American Airways until 1960. Supplemental air carrier. Merged into Trans International Airlines
Sawyer Aviation	Arizona					Phoenix Sky Harbor	1961	1998	Operated Cessna 182, Cessna 425C, Cessna Citation
SB Air	Texas					Dallas Love Field	1999	2019	Established as Seven Bar Flying Services. Renamed SevenBar Aviation. Medical transport operator.
Scanderbeg Air	New York		P1			New York Kennedy	2009	2009	Charter carrier
SCAT South Central Air Transport	Arkansas					Fayetteville	1946	1948	Operated Cessna UC-78
Scenic Air	California					Columbia	1994	1995	
Scenic Air Tours Hawaii	Hawaii					Honolulu	1992	1996	
Scenic Airlines	Nevada		YR	YRR		North Las Vegas	1967	2007	Acquired by Grand Canyon Airlines and renamed Grand Canyon Scenic Airlines
Scenic Airways	Arizona					Grand Canyon	1927	1930	Renamed Grand Canyon Airlines
Scheduled Skyways	Arkansas					Fayetteville	1953	1972	Merged into Air Midwest
Scheerer Air	Florida					Palm Beach	1979	1980	Merged into Florida Commuter Airlines
Seaboard & Western Airlines	New York					New York Kennedy	1947	1961	Renamed Seaboard World Airlines
Seaboard World Airlines	New York		SB	SEW	SEABOARD	New York Kennedy	1946	1980	As Seaboard & Western Airlines, merged into Flying Tiger Line
Seaco Airlines	Michigan					Detroit Metro	1976	1980	Operated Cessna 402, Piper Aztec
Seacoast Air Transport	Massachusetts					New Bedford	1937	1939	
SeaCoast Airlines	Florida			SCC	SEA-COASTER	St. Pete–Clearwater	2002	2012	
Seagull Air	Alaska					Bethel	1988	1989	Founded by J. Timothy Cracie
Seagull Air Lines	Utah					Salt Lake City	1929	1930	Operated Curtiss Robin
Seair Alaska Airlines	Alaska					Anchorage	1980	1986	Established as Sea Airmotive. Operated Convair 440, Twin Otter
Seaplanes of Key West	Florida					Key West	2004	2006	
SeaPort Airlines	Oregon		K5	SQH	SASQUATCH	Portland	2008	2016	Went into bankruptcy
Seattle Air Charter	Washington					Seattle-Tacoma	1947	1949	
Seattle Commuter Airlines	Washington					Seattle-Tacoma	1965	1968	Scheduled commuter air services
Seattle Flying Services	Washington					Seattle	1930	1930	Founded by Vern Gorst
Seattle-Victoria Airmail Line	Washington					Seattle	1919	1919	Established as Hubbard Air Transport
Sentinel Airlines	Texas					Abilene	1971	1971	Operated Cessna 402
Seven Bar Flying Services	Texas					Dallas Love Field	1947	1999	Medical transport operator. Renamed SB Air
Seven Seas Airlines	California					Burbank	1957	1961	Operated C-46, DC-4
Severson Air Activities	Montana					Great Falls	1964	1971	Operated Cessna 182, Cessna 320
Seward Airways	Alaska					Seward	1937	1939	Founded by John Littley
Shalkow Air Cargo Express	Ohio					Cleveland Hopkins	1982	1989	Established as Ace Air Cargo Express. Operated C-47
Shasta Air	California					Yreka Rohrer Field	1968	1983	Operated Piper Navajo
Shavano Air	Colorado			SHV	SHAVANO	Harriet Alexander Field	1960	2002	
Shawnee Airlines	Florida		XW	SHW	SHAWNEE	Orlando Executive	1968	1975	Acquired by Florida Airlines
Shawnee Airways	Ohio					Akron–Canton	1961	1972	Founded by Ernest Stadvec
Sheffield P. Wilds	South Carolina						1967	1971	Operated Aero Commander 500, Piper Apache
Shelby Sky Haven	Ohio					Mansfield	1948	1963	Renamed GCS Air Service
Shelter Charter Services	Georgia					Atlanta	2017	2017	Operated Cessna Citation I
Shelton-Jefferson Airways	Missouri					St. Louis Lambert	1930	1931	Operated Ogden Osprey
Shenandoah Airlines	Virginia					Charlottesville–Albemarle	1968	1970	Operated Beech E18S
Shoreline Aviation	Connecticut					Tweed New Haven	1980	2020	Operated Cessna Caravan seaplane
Shorter Airlines	Michigan					Pellston Regional	1968	1975	Operated Beech E18S, DC-3
Shuttle Air Lines	California					Glendale Grand Central	1931	1932	Operated Ogden Osprey
Shuttle America	Indiana		S5	TCF	MERCURY	Chicago O'Hare	1995	2017	Republic Airways Holdings merged into another subsidiary
Shuttle by United	California		UA	UAL	UNITED	San Francisco	1994	2001	Subsidiary of United Airlines, renamed United Shuttle
Sidles Airways	Nebraska					Lincoln	1930	n/a	Operated Stinson Detroiter (NC7474)
Siemans Air Transport	Pennsylvania					Uniontown	1927	n/a	Founded by Charles L. Siemans
Sierra Expressway	California			SRX	SIERRA EX	Oakland	1994	1996	
Sierra Mountain Airways	California					Oakland	1987	1989	
Sierra Nevada Airways	Nevada		ZS			Las Vegas McCarran	1984	1997	Operated Beech Baron, Cessna 402C
Sierra Pacific Airlines	California					Oakland	1965	1966	Operated Beech 18
Sierra Pacific Airlines	Arizona					Tucson	1976	1982	
Sierra West Airlines	California					Van Nuys	1974	1975	Operated Beech Queen Air
Silver State Airlines	Nevada					Las Vegas McCarran	1979	1982	Charter carrier
Silver State Helicopters	Nevada					Henderson Executive	1999	2008	
Silver Wings Aviation	South Dakota					Rapid City	1975	1976	
Silver Airways	Florida				SILVER	Tampa	2011	2025	
Simmons Airlines	Michigan		MQ	SYM	SIMMONS	Marquette	1978	1998	Merged into American Eagle Airlines
Sis-Q Flying Service	California					Sonoma County	1962	1979	Aerial fire fighting. Operated Grumman Tigercat
Sisk Aviation Activities	Illinois					St. Louis Downtown	1964	1977	Third-level services
Sizer Airways	North Dakota					Fargo-Hector Field	1970	1979	Established as Luthi Aviation. Operated Beech 18, Riley Rocket
Skagway Air Service	Alaska		7J	SGY			1964	2007	
Sky Bus Public Charter	Florida					Fort Lauderdale	1993	1993	Operated Boeing 727-200
Sky Courier							1988	1988	To Airborne Express
Sky Harbor Air Service	Nebraska		NE	SKD	SKY DAWG	Omaha	1954	1970	
Sky Harbor Air Services	Wyoming		WY	SHC	SKY HARBOR CHEYENNE	Cheyenne	1988		
Sky King	Florida		5K	SGB	SONGBIRD	Miami	1990	2015	Rebranded as Songbird Airways
Sky Tours	Massachusetts						1947	1953	Established as Erie Isle Airways. Renamed Island Airlines
Sky Tours Hawaii	Hawaii						1965	1971	
Sky Trek International Air Lines	Virginia					Richmond	1996	2000	Renamed Discovery Airways in 1999
Sky Trucks International	Florida					Fort Lauderdale	1972	1975	
Skybus Airlines	Ohio		SX	SKB	SKYBUS	Columbus	2007	2008	
Skybus Express	Georgia					Atlanta	1991	1992	Operated GAF Nomad
Skycoach	California								1950s combine. Aircraft in picture is Monarch Air Service or Currey Air Transport
Skyfreighters	Texas					Grand Prairie	1984	1991	Established as Coker Airfreight. Acquired by Kitty Hawk Airways. Operated Douglas C-117D
Skyfreight Airlines	Florida					Miami	1981	1984	Operated DC-3
Skyline Air Service	Washington					Seattle-Tacoma	1967	1969	Founded by Tom Wilson. To Puget Sound Airlines
Skyline Motors Aviation Services	Ohio					Youngstown–Warren	1979	1981	Renamed B.A.S Airlines
Skylink Airways	Maryland					Washington Dulles	2003	2005	Rebranded as MAXjet Airways
Skymark Airlines	California					Sacramento Executive	1968	1969	
Skymaster Air Taxi	New Hampshire		8M	SDD	SKY DANCE	Laconia	1989	1993	Renamed Atlantic North Airlines
Skyservice USA	Colorado					Chicago Rockford	1998	2000	
Skystar International	Virginia			SSK		Washington National	1984	1987	International pilgrimage
Skystream Airlines	Illinois		DN			Chicago Meigs Field	1973	1980	Founded by Cecil Pond. Acquired Hub Airlines
SkyValue	Florida		XP	CXP	RUBY MOUNTAIN	Fort Lauderdale-Hollywood	2006	2007	
SkyValue Airways	Michigan		4A	DYN		Oakland County	2018	2018	
Skyvan Airways							1963	1964	Operated C-46
Skyway Airlines (Skyway Aviation)	Missouri		ZY			Forney Field	1960	1979	Air taxi operator
Skyway Airlines							1968	1980	Known as Skyway Commuter. Operated Beech E18S
Skyway Airlines	Wisconsin		AL	SYX	SKYWAY-EX	Milwaukee Mitchell	1994	2008	
Skyway Commuter	Florida					Ocala	1984	1985	Established ad Skyway of Ocala
Skyway of Ocala	Florida					Ocala	1981	1984	Operated as Air Florida Commuter
Skyways International	Florida					Miami	1946	1951	Operated C-46, DC-3, Lockheed Lodestar
Skyways International	Florida					Miami	1969	1972	Renamed Transair Cargo
Skyways International	Texas					Houston Bush	1978		
Skyworld Airlines	Colorado		PC	SPC	SKYWORLD	Denver	1986	1988	Previously Ports of Call Travel Club, reverted to Ports of Call Air in 1988
Slick Airways	Texas		SL	SL		Hollywood Burbank	1946	1966	To Airlift International
Slocum Airlines	Florida			SLO	SLOCUM	Miami	1981	1984	Operated as Air Florida Commuter
Small Community Airlines	Florida					Dallas Love Field	2007	2009	Operated BAE Jetstream
SMB Stage Lines	Texas		MJ	STG	STAGE	Dallas Fort Worth	1967	1990	Operated Convair 580, Convair 600, DC-3
Smokers Express	Florida					Melbourne Orlando	1993	1993	Not launched
Smyer Aircraft	Kansas					Strother Field	1968	1972	Operated Cessna 206, Cherokee Six
Solar Airlines	New Mexico					Roswell	1964	1971	Operated Beech 18, Dumod Infinité I, PacAero Tradewind
Soldotna Air Service	Alaska					Soldotna	1978	1979	
Song	Georgia		DL	DAL	DELTA	Atlanta	2003	2006	Merged back in with its parent company, Delta Air Lines
Songbird Airways	Florida		6K	SGB	SONGBIRD	Orlando	1990	2017	Began as Sky King Inc.
Sonora Air Lines	Nevada					Reno–Tahoe	1967	1971	Operated Cessna 150, Cessna 172, Piper PA-23
Sourdough Air Transport	Alaska					Fairbanks	1953	1962	
South Atlantic Airlines	South Carolina					Myrtle Beach	1968	1969	Operated Aero Commander 500, Turbo Commander 690
South Bend Airways	Indiana					Cadet Field	1927	n/a	Founded by Stephen Darius, Carl G Jordan. Operated Pheasant H-10
South Central Air	Alaska			SCA		Kenai	1967	2001	Founded by Harold and Irene Andersen. Operated BAe Jetstream 31, BN Islander, Cessna
South Central Air Transport (SCAT)	Mississippi					Natchez–Adams	1971	1977	
South Central Airlines	Florida					Ocala	1963	1964	
South East Airlines									The name of a 1950s combine, in whose name associated carriers flew.
South Pacific Air Lines	California					Honolulu	1960	1963	Merged into Pan Am in 1964
South Pacific Island Airways	Hawaii		HK	SPI	SOUTH PACIFIC	Honolulu	1973	1987	
South Winds Cargo	Florida		WE	SWC		Miami	2002	2005	Merged into Centurion Cargo. Operated DC-10
Southcentral Air	Alaska		XE	SCA	SOUTH CENTRAL	Kenai	1975	1999	
Southeast Airlines	Tennessee		SL		SOUTHEAST	Tri-Cities	1956	1959	
Southeast Airlines	Florida		NS	SEA	SOUTHEAST AIR	Miami	1966	1981	Originally known as Cat Cay Airlines
Southeast Airlines	Florida		Sl	SNK		Youngstown–Warren	1999	2004	
Southeast Airlines (Southeastern Aviation)	Tennessee					Jackson	1960	1979	Operated de Havilland Dove
Southeast Skyways	Alaska		SE			Juneau	1968	1983	Founded by Dean Williams and Billy Bernhardt. Operated Cessna 207, DHC Beaver
Southeastern Commuter Airlines	Georgia					Atlanta	1973	1983	Acquired by Atlantic Southeast Airlines
Southern Air Transport (1929)	Texas						1929	1929	Controlled by Avco, the company that organized American Airlines
Southern Air Transport	Florida; Ohio		SJ	SJM	SOUTHERN AIR	Miami; Columbus, Ohio	1947	1998	CIA-owned 1960–1973. Assets became Southern Air
Southern Airlines	Florida						1981	1981	Rebranding Florida Commuter Airlines
Southern Airlink	Mississippi					Bay Springs	1996	1997	
Southern Airways	Georgia		SO	SO	SOUTHERN	Atlanta	1949	1979	Merged with North Central Airlines to form Republic Airlines (1979–1986)
Southern Airways	Mississippi					Jackson–Medgar	1985	1987	Established a Flight Line
Southern Aviation	Oklahoma					Lawton	1964	1974	Operated Cessna 182, Cessna 206
Southern Cross Airways							1959	1960	Operated C-46
Southern Express	Florida						1984	1986	Formerly known as Finair Express
Southern International Airways	Florida						1981	1981	Successor of Florida Airlines operated as Air Florida Commuter
Southern Jersey Airways	New Jersey		6J	ALC	ACOM	Cape May	1946	1991	Established as Atlantic City Airlines operating as Allegheny Commuter
Southern Jersey Resorts Airways	New Jersey					Atlantic City	1965	1990	Operated Twin Otter, Dash-8
Southern Maryland Aviation	Maryland		SF			St. Mary's County	1977	1979	
Southern Nevada Airlines	Nevada						1980	1981	
Southern Skyways	Georgia					Atlanta	1980		A virtual airline (economics) which markets air travel branding
Southwest Air Fast Express	Oklahoma					St. Louis Lambert	1928	1929	Acquired by American Airlines
Southwest Airlines	Texas					San Antonio	1965	1967	Established as Wild Goose Flying Service
Southwest Airways	California					San Francisco	1941	1958	Local service carrier renamed Pacific Air Lines
Southwest Ryan Airlines	Indiana					McIntyre Field	1928	n/a	Operated Ryan Brougham
Special Aviation Systems	Michigan						2001	2004	Cargo carrier. Operated Embraer Bandeirante
Speed Star Express	California						1968	2005	Operated Twin Otter
Spirit Air	Alaska						2005	2009	Commuter and package carrier
Spirit Airlines	Florida		NK	NKS	SPIRIT WINGS	Fort Lauderdale	1983	2026	filed Chapter 7 bankruptcy also failed merger from JetBlue
Spirit Aviation	California					Van Nuys	1994	1995	Charter operator
Spirit Lake Airways	Iowa					Spencer	1977	1979	Renamed Great Lakes Airlines
Spirit of America Airlines	California		IM	IAS	STARFLEET	Burlingame, California	1985	1989	Continuation of IASCO's airline activities
Spokane Airways	Washington					Spokane	1990	2012	
Sports Air Travel	Oregon			WCC	WEST COAST	Portland–Troutdale	1982	1999	
Sports Air Travel	California					Burbank	1997	1997	To Ameriflight
Sports by Air	South Carolina					Hilton Head	1968	1971	Operated Aero Commander 680
Sportsflight Airways	Arizona					Tucson	1993	1995	Renamed Pacific International Airlines
St. Germain Aviation	Illinois					Meigs Field	1964	1971	Operated Piper Twin Comanche
St. Petersburg–Tampa Airboat Line	Florida					St. Petersburg	January 1914	May 1914	Benoist Type XIV
Stadvec Aviation	Illinois					Akron–Canton	1958	1961	Founded by Ernest Stadvec. Operated Piper PA-22 Tri-Pacer
Stagecoach Airways	Texas					San Antonio	1958	1961	Operated Beech Twin Bonanza, Lockheed L.12 Electra
Standard Air Cargo	California					San Diego	1946	1953	Original name of Standard Airways
Standard Air Lines	California					Los Angeles	1927	1930	Subsidiary of Aero Corporation of California. In 1930 acquired by Western Air Express
Standard Air Lines	California					Long Beach	1945	1949	Established as Fireball Air Express
Standard Airways	California		FD			San Diego; Burbank	1946	1969	Established as Standard Air Cargo
Standard Airways	Michigan					Pontiac	1966	1969	Operated Beech 18, Piper Navajo
Star Air Service	Alaska					Anchorage	1932	1944	Renamed Alaska Airlines
Starflight	Nevada					Reno–Tahoe	1975	1975	Operated BAC One-Eleven
Starlight Express							1987	1991	Cargo feeder for FedEx Express
Starflite	New York					White Plains	1965	1966	Contract service operator
Starship Airlines	Arizona					Tucson	1991	2000	Operated Convair 240C, Convair 440F
Starstruck Jet	Tennessee					Nashville	1998	1998	
State Airlines	South Carolina					Charlotte Douglas	1940	1940	Operated Lockheed Lodestar, Bellanca Cruisair
State Airlines	Florida					Ft. Lauderdale	1981	1984	
StatesWest Airlines	Arizona		YW	SWJ	STATES	Phoenix Sky Harbor	1986	1993	
Stateswide Airline	New Hampshire					Manchester–Boston	1964	1965	Operated de Havilland Dove
Stearns Air Alaska	Alaska					Anchorage	1992	2001	
Stewart Air Service	California					Los Angeles	1946	1971	
Stol Air Commuter	California		VB			Fresno Yosemite	1972	1978	Renamed WestAir Commuter Airlines
Stout Air Services	Michigan					Ford Airport	1925	1930	Purchased by National Air Transport
Strachan Skyways	Georgia					Hunter Field	1936	1938	
Streamline Air	Massachusetts			SRY	STINGRAY	Hanscom Field	2010	2012	
Suburban Airlines			AL			DuBois	1968	1989	To Allegheny Airlines
Suburban Airways	California								
Summit Airlines	Pennsylvania		DU	SMM	SUMMITAIR	Philadelphia	1966	1986	Established as Del Air Cargo Airlines
Summit Airways	Colorado					Denver	1946	1947	Established as Challenger Airlines
Summit Aviation	Florida					Miami	1999	1999	Charter operator
Sumo Airlines	New York		SM			New York Kennedy	1988	1996	Cargo operator. Operated Piper Lance
Sun Air Express	Florida					Fort Lauderdale	2014	2016	Acquired by Southern Airways Express
Sun Air International	Florida					Fort Lauderdale-Hollywood	2011	2014	Rebranded as Sun Air Express
Sun Aire Lines	California		OO			Palm Springs	1968	1984	Established as Borrego Springs Airlines. Merged into SkyWest Airlines
Sun Airlines	Missouri					St. Louis Lambert	1967	1970	Founded by George Caleshu. Operated Beech 18, Twin Otter, de Havilland Heron
Sun Airlines	Florida		YX				1969	1978	
Sun Jet International	Florida		JX	SJI	SUNJET	St. Pete–Clearwater	1993	1997	Founded by Tom Kolfenbach. Renamed Southeast Airlines
Sun Land Airlines	Nevada		RF			Reno	1980	1981	Operated single Boeing 737-200
Sun Pacific International	Arizona			SNP		Tucson	1995	1999	Operated Boeing 727-200
Sun Valley Airlines	Utah					Salt Lake City	1964	1972	Established as Janss Airways in 1964. Acquired by Key Airlines
Sun Valley Key Airlines	Idaho					Friedman Memorial	1968	1972	Formerly Sun Valley Airlines renamed Key Airlines
Sun West Airlines	Arizona		KY	SNW	SUN WEST	Phoenix Sky Harbor	1980	1985	
Sunaire Express	Virgin Islands		OY	SUA	SUNBIRD	Saint Croix Rohlsen	1982	1994	Went bankrupt
Sunbelt Airlines	Arkansas		JM	BTR		Harrell Field	1979	1984	Known as Jamaire until March 1982
Sunbird Air	Florida					Fort Lauderdale	1984	1989	Operated Convair 440
Sunbird Airlines	North Carolina		ED	SBD	SUNBIRD	Charlotte Douglas	1979	1987	Absorbed by Atlanta Express. Became CCAir in 1986.
Sunbird Airlines	Tennessee					Nashville	1980	1980	Operated Piper Cherokee Six
Sunbird Airways	Florida		B6			Orlando	1993	1996	
SunCoast Airlines	Florida		WS	SNT	SUNCOAST	Fort Lauderdale-Hollywood	1986	1988	Went bankrupt. Operated Boeing 727-100
Sunjet Aviation	Florida					Orlando Sanford	1997	1999	Operated Cessna Citation V, Learjet 35
Sunship 1 Airlines	Illinois					Chicago Rockford	2005	2005	Trade name for Ryan International
Sunrise Airlines	Nevada		OQ	SDC	SUNDANCE	Las Vegas McCarran	1967	2000	Established as Lake Powell Air Service
Sunwest International									
Sunworld International Airlines	Kentucky		SM	SWI	SUNWORLD	Cincinnati/Northern Kentucky	1996	2004	
Sunworld International Airways	Nevada		JK	SWI	SUNWORLD	Las Vegas McCarran	1983	1988	Established as Jetwest International Airways
Supair	California					Buchanan Field	1950	1953	Operated DC-3
Superior Air	West Virginia					Fairmont	1972	1973	Operated BN Islander
Superior Airlines	Georgia					Atlanta	1960	1963	Operated de Havilland Dove, Aero Commander
Superior Airlines	Indiana						1961	1962	
Superior Airlines	Arizona					Columbus Glenn	1994	2003	To Mesa Airlines
Susquehanna Airways	New York					Sidney	1979	1985	Established as Forde-Aire. Operated Riley Turbo Skyliner, Piper Aztec
Swift Air	Florida		WQ	SWQ	SWIFTFLIGHT	Miami	1997	2019	Renamed iAero Airways
Swift Aire Lines	California		WI			San Luis Obispo	1969	1981	Merged with Golden Gate Airlines
Swissjets	Florida					Fort Lauderdale	2000	2001	Renamed Tourjets
T
T & G Aviation	Arizona					Buckeye	1990	2000	Renamed International Air Response. Operated Douglas DC-6, Douglas DC-7B
TAB Express Airlines	Florida			TBI	TAB	Melbourne Orlando	1992	2005	Operated Beech 1900
TAG Airlines	Michigan					Detroit City	1955	1970	Shut down following crash
TAT-Maddux Air Lines							1929	1930	Merged with Western Air Express to form Transcontinental & Western Air
Tahoe Air	California		XP	CXP	CASINO EXPRESS	Lake Tahoe	1999	1999	
Taku Glacier Air Gold	Alaska					Juneau	1984	1994	Operated Cessna Stationair, DHC Beaver
Talkeetna Air Service	Alaska					Talkeetna	1947	1948	Renamed Talkeetna Air Taxi
Tamgass Aviation	Alaska						1964	1969	Renamed Southcoast Airways
Tanana Air Taxi	Alaska					Tanana	1972	1974	Renamed Alaska Central Airways
Tanner Airlines	California					Los Angeles	1930s	1930s	Operated Stinson Detroiter
TapJets	North Dakota					Fargo Hector	2016	2018	
Taquan Air Service	Alaska					Ketchikan	1977	2000	Renamed Taquan Air. Operated DHC Beaver
Tar Heel Aviation	North Dakota			THC	TARHEEL	Jacksonville Ellis	1975	2000	
Tatonduk Flying Service	Alaska					Eagle	1977	1980	Renamed Everts Air Alaska. Operated Cessna 180
Taxi Air Group	Ohio					Cleveland Burke Lakefront	1955	1957	Founded by William Knight. Renamed TAG Airlines. Operated DHC Otter
Ted	Illinois		UA	UAL	UNITED	Denver	2004	2009	Merged back into parent company United Airlines
Tejas Airlines	Texas		TB			San Antonio	1976	1980	Filed for Chapter 11 bankruptcy
Telair International									
Telford Aviation	Maine						1995	2004	
Tempelhof Airways	Florida			TEH	TEMPELHOF	Fort Lauderdale	1981	1990	Operated from West Berlin
Temple Airlines							1968	1968	
Tempus Jets	South Carolina					Greenville–Spartanburg	2007	2018	Executive jet charter. Went bankrupt
TEMSCO Airlines	Alaska					Ketchikan	1986	1991	The helicopter division continue to operate as TEMSCO Helicopters Inc.
Tennessee Airways	Tennessee		ZN	TEN	TENNESSEE	Knoxville McGhee	1978	1990	Operated Embraer Bandeirante
TennesseeSkies	Tennessee					Nashville	2009	2012	A Pacific Wings subsidiary
Tepper Aviation	Florida					Crestview	1987	2006	
Texas International Airlines	Texas		TI	TIA	TEXAS	Houston Intercontinental; DFW Airport	1969	1982	Merged into Continental Airlines
Texas National Airlines	Texas			TXN	TEXAS NATIONAL	San Antonio	1986	1988	Established as Border Airlines
Texas Air Leasing Corporation	Texas						1984	1990	Aircraft leasing firm
The Air-Oasis Co	California					Long Beach	1963	1963	Operated DC-3
The Gulf Coast Airline	Louisiana					New Orleans	1923	1932	Renamed Johnson Airways
The Hagerstown Commuter	Maryland					Hagerstown	1962	1983	Operated as an Allegheny Commuter
The Hawaii Express	Hawaii		LP	HEA		Los Angeles	1982	1983	
The Lord's Airline	Florida		5Q			Miami	1986	1987	
The Maui Commuter	Hawaii					Kahului	1975	1978	Founded by Jack Holzman and Robert Frost. Established as Ananda Air
Thompson Aeronautical Corporation	Ohio					Cleveland	1928	1932	Renamed Transamerican Airlines
Thor Solberg Aviation	New York					Curtiss Field	1929	1930	Operated Great Lakes 2-T-1, Bellanca CH-200
Thunderbird Airlines	Utah					Ogden-Hinckley	1964	1969	Renamed Key Airlines. Operated Twin Otter
Tibben Flight Lines	Iowa					Cedar Rapids	1992	1996	Charter operator
TMA Trans-Michigan Airlines	Michigan					Traverse City	1969	1972	Cargo carrier
TMC Airlines	Michigan			TMM	WILLOW RUN	Willow Run	1994	2005	Cargo carrier. Operated L-188, DC-8
Tol Air	Puerto Rico		TI	TOL	TOL AIR		1983	2006	Acquired by Four Star Air Cargo
Tourjets	Florida					Fort Lauderdale	2001	2002	Established as Swissjets
Tower Air	New York		FF	TOW	TEE AIR	New York Kennedy	1983	2000	
TPA-The Aloha Airline	Hawaii					Honolulu	1950	1958	Established as Trans-Pacific Airlines
TPI International Airways	Georgia		UF			Brunswick Golden Isles	1989	1996	
Tradewinds Airlines	North Carolina		WI	TDX	TRADEWINDS EXPRESS	Piedmont Triad	1991	2010	
Trans Air	Florida		GO	TRA	TRANS ISLAND	Fort Lauderdale–Hollywood	1982	1986	Established as Trans Island Airways
Trans Air Lines	Louisiana					New Orleans Armstrong	1962	1963	Renamed Air Lines. Operated Aero Commanders
Trans Air Link	Florida					Miami	1986	1989	
Trans Alaskan Airlines	Alaska					Anchorage	1955	1963	Operated DC-4, DC-6A, PBY-5A Catalina
Trans American Airways	California					Lockheed Air Terminal	1946	1957	Founded by Edward Ware Tabor. Member airline of North American Airlines Group
Trans American Charter	Illinois			ECQ		Chicago O'Hare	1992	1995	
Trans Caribbean Airways	New York		TR	TCA			1945	1971	Acquired by American Airlines
Trans Caribbean Air Cargo Lines	New York		TR	TCA			1945	1971	Original name of Trans Caribbean Airways
Trans Continental Airlines	Michigan		TD	TCN	TRANCON	Willow Run	1975	2000	Established as pilot training spinoff of bankrupt Universal Airlines. Rebranded as Express.Net Airlines
Trans East Airlines	New Hampshire					Manchester–Boston	1963	1972	Formed as Statewide Airlines
Trans East International	New York					Farmingdale	1982	1984	Established as New York Air. Renamed Island Air. Operated Twin Otter, Embraer Bandeirante
Trans Global Airlines	California					Long Beach	1957	1961	Founded by Donald Rich
Trans Global Airlines	New Jersey					Newark Liberty	1979	1984	Charter carrier
Trans Global Vacations							2002	2003	
Trans International Airlines	California		TV	TV	TRANS INTERNATIONAL	Oakland	1960	1979	Supplemental air carrier, formed in 1946 as Los Angeles Air Service, rebranded to Transamerica Airlines in 1979
Trans International Airlines	Florida		LP			Orlando	1985	1989	reconstituted Central American International
Trans International Express				BAP	BIG APPLE		1998	2002	
Trans Island Airways	Florida		GO	TRA	TRANS ISLAND	Fort Lauderdale–Hollywood	1977	1982	Sold and renamed Trans Air
Trans Magic Airlines	Idaho					Boise	1969	1974	Merged into Air Idaho
Trans National Airlines							1948	1957	Originally Alaska Southern Airlines. Member airline of North American Airlines Group
Trans National Airlines (1973)	California					Oakland	1973	1979	
Trans Ocean Airways	Florida					Arcadia	1989	1990	Established as Gulf Air International
Trans Penn Airlines	Pennsylvania					Reedsville	1971	1980	Operated Piper Navajo
Trans Regional Airlines	Texas					Big Spring	1975	1977	Founded by Louis Rosembaum. Established as El Paso Transport
Trans Sierra Airlines	Arizona			TSI		Tucson	1970	1971	Founded by Chris Condon and Allan Silliphant. Renamed Sierra Pacific Airlines
Trans Southern Airways	South Carolina					Florence	1976	1985	Established as Pee Dee Air Express Inc.
Trans Southern Airways	Georgia						1984	1985	Routes that had been dropped by Piedmont Airlines
Trans States Airlines	Missouri		AX	LOF	WATERSKI	Chicago–O'Hare; Denver	1989	2020	Shutdown due to travel disruptions caused by the COVID-19 pandemic
Trans Tropic Airlines	Florida					Miami			
Trans World Airlines	Missouri		TW	TWA	TWA	New York Kennedy	1950	2001	Merged into American Airlines
Trans World Connection	Missouri		TW	TWA		New York Kennedy; Los Angeles		2001	
Trans World Express	Missouri		TW	TWA	RZ	Philadelphia Northeast	1987	1995	
Trans-Air-Link	Florida			GJB	SKY TRUCK	Opa Locka	1977	?	
Trans-Cal Airlines	California					Long Beach	1968	1971	Operated Beech Queen Air, Beech Bonanza
Trans-Central Airlines	Oklahoma		ZM	ACN		Oklahoma City	1980	1984	
Trans-Colorado Airlines	Colorado		VJ	TCE	TRANS COLORADO	Gunnison–Crested Butte	1980	1988	Became a Continental Express carrier
Trans-Florida Airlines	Florida			TFA	TRANS FLORIDA	Daytona Beach	1966	2006	Established as Daytona Aviation in 1962
Trans-Marine Airways	New York					Daytona Beach	1945	1946	Charter services
Trans-Michigan Airlines	Michigan					Traverse City	1969	1970	Operated Beech 99, Cherokee Six
Trans-Mo Airlines	Missouri		XU				1966	1986	
Trans-Nebraska Airlines	Nebraska						1971	1973	Founded by Tom Brown. Operated Cessna 402A
Trans-Nevada Air Service	Nevada					Las Vegas McCarran	1968	1971	Commuter services. Operated Beech C-45 Expeditor
Trans-Pacific Airlines	Hawaii					Honolulu	1946	1950	Renamed TPA-The Aloha Airline. Operated C-47
Trans-Texas Airways	Texas		TT			Houston-Hobby; Dallas-Love Field	1947	1968	Renamed Texas International Airlines. Operated DC-3, Convair 240
Transair	New York					New York-LaGuardia	1946	1946	
Transair Airlines	Florida					St. Pete–Clearwater	1946	1949	Operated DC-3, DC-4, Lockheed Super Electra, Lockheed Lodestar
Transair Cargo	Florida					Miami	1972	1977	Established as Skyways International in 1962
Transair Hawaii	Hawaii					Honolulu	1946	1948	Operated C-46
Transamerica Airlines	California		TV	TVA	TRANS-AMERICA	Oakland	1979	1986	Rebranded from Trans International Airlines
Transcontinental & Western Air	New York					New York-LaGuardia	1930	1950	Renamed Trans World Airlines; operated DC-1, DC-2
Transcontinental Air Transport							1928	1929	Merged with Maddux Air Lines to form TAT-Maddux Air Lines
TransMeridian Airlines	Georgia		T9	TRZ	TRANS MERIDIAN	Orlando Sanford	1995	2005	Established as Prime Air
Transocean Air Lines	California		TL		TALOA	Oakland	1946	1960	Went bankrupt
TransOcean Airways	Louisiana		QG	GAT	GULFTRANS	New Iberia	1989	1990	Established as Gulf Air Transport. Charter operator
Transtar Airlines	Florida			TRH	TRANSTAR	Orlando	1992	1993	
TranStar Airlines	Texas		MC	TST	TRANSTAR	Houston-Hobby	1986	1987	Shut down by parent company Southwest Airlines
Transtate Airlines	New York					New York-LaGuardia	1963	n/a	Operated Lockheed L-1049
Transwest Air Express	California			ACW		Oakland	1977	1981	Established as Zoom Zoom Air in 1973. Renamed Air Charter West. Operated DC-3
Transwestern Airlines	Utah		WZ	TRW	TRANS WEST	Logan-Cache	1977	1983	Acquired by Horizon Air
Travel Air Aviation							1969	1972	As part of Allegheny Commuter. Operated Beech 99
Tri-Motor Safety Airlines	New York					Garden City	1929	1929	Rename to New York Safety Airlines. Operated Ford Trimotor (NC1780)
Tri-State Airlines	Iowa					Rickenbacker	1930	1936	Renamed Hanford Tri-State Airlines
Tri-State Flying Service	West Virginia					Huntington Tri-State	1971	1972	Established as Air Enterprises in 1969
Tricon International Airlines	Texas		RI			Dallas Love Field	1967	1978	Operated Beech 18, DC-3
Trinity Air Bahamas	Florida					Fort Lauderdale–Hollywood	1993	1993	
TriStar Airlines	Nevada		T3	TRY	TRISTAR AIR	Las Vegas McCarran	1995	1997	
Tropic Air	Hawaii					Honolulu	1980	1989	Associated with Air Molokai
Tropic Air	California					Burbank	1988	1988	
Tropical Airways	New York					New York Kennedy	1986	1989	
Tropics International	Florida					Miami	1968	1971	Operated Beech 18
Trump Shuttle	New York		TB	TPS	TRUMP	New York-LaGuardia	1989	1992	To US Airways Shuttle
Trust Territory Air Service	Trust Territory of the Pacific Islands					Guam	1951	1968	Contracted with Transocean and Pan Am to fly aircraft owned by Trust Territory
Tulip City Executive Express	Minnesota					Holland	1995	1995	Operated Beech 18
Tulsa-Oklahoma City Airline	Oklahoma					Tulsa	1928	1929	Ownership transferred to Universal Aviation Corporation
Turbo Air	Idaho					Boise	1995	1995	Charter carrier
Turks Air Cargo	Florida					Miami	1972	2015	Founded by Robert Caravan
Turner Airlines	Indiana					Indianapolis	1947	1950	Renamed Lake Central Airlines
TWC Aviation, Inc	California					San José	1998	2015	Acquired and rebranded into Landmark Aviation
Twentieth Century Airlines	North Carolina					Charlotte Douglas	1946	1963	Founded by Glen Shave and Christopher Bachman. Operated DC-3, DC-4. A member carrier of North American Airlines
Tyee Airlines	Alaska		OF			Ketchikan	1975	1986	Operated DHC Beaver
Tyme Airlines	Ohio					Cleveland Burke	1965	1967	Merged into Wright Airlines
U
U Fly Air Freighters	Texas					Dallas Fort Worth	1973	1975	Cargo operator
U. S. Airlines	New York; Florida; Georgia					Fort Lauderdale; Atlanta; St Peterburg	1945	1954	Scheduled freight carrier
U.S. Aviation	Wyoming		BH			Riverton	1977	1979	Renamed Air U.S.
UltrAir	Texas		RL	ULT	ULTRAIR	Houston	1993	1994	All business airline for six months of 1993, then a low-fare carrier for 10 months
Unalakleet Air Taxi	Alaska					Unalakleet	1953	1979	Renamed Ryan Air
United Couriers	California					Burbank	1971	1971	Merged with California Air Charter
United Feeder Service	Illinois		U2	UFS	FEEDER EXPRESS	Chicago O'Hare	1993	2000	
United Shuttle	California		UA	UAL	UNITED	San Francisco	1994	2001	Subsidiary of United Airlines, formerly Shuttle by United; folded back into United
United States Air Transport	New York					New York Curtis	1929	1930	Operated Ryan Brougham
United States Overseas Airlines	New Jersey		US	US	USOVER	Cape May	1946	1964	Supplemental air carrier, flew scheduled service to Okinawa and military charters
United Union Airways	Washington					Felts Field	1929	1929	Founded by W R Frentzel, C M Baker & Francis Baker
Universal Air Lines Corporation	Missouri					St. Louis Lambert	1928	1934	Merged with 90 other airlines to form American Airlines
Universal Airlines	Texas					El Paso	1957	1959	dba of S.S.W.
Universal Airlines	Michigan; California		UV	UV		Willow Run; Oakland	1966	1972	Established as Zantop Air Transport
Universal Airlines	Michigan					Willow Run	1979	1992	Cargo operator
Universal Aviation Corporation	Missouri						1929		An airline holding company
Upper Valley Aviation	Texas					McAllen Miller	1964	1975	Operated Beech 99, Beech E18S
Uraba, Medellin and Central Airways	Panama Canal Zone		UR	UR		N/A	1932	1959	Owned, equipped and crewed by Pan Am
U.S. Aircoach	California					Hollywood Burbank	1949	1959	Supplemental air carrier shut by CAB in 1959 for finances & compliance
US Airways	Arizona		US	USA	US AIR	Phoenix Sky Harbor	1997	2015	Merged into American Airlines
US Airways Express	Arizona		US	USA	US AIR	Phoenix Sky Harbor	1997	2015	Rebranded as American Eagle
US Airways Shuttle	Virginia		US	USA	US AIR	Washington National	1997	2015	Founded as Eastern Air Lines Shuttle, rebranded as American Airlines Shuttle
US Check Airlines	Ohio						1974	1974	Delivery of documents and small packages
US Helicopter	New York		UH	USH	US HELI	Downtown Manhattan Heliport	2004	2009	
USA3000 Airlines	Pennsylvania		US	GWY	GETAWAY	Philadelphia	2001	2012	
USAfrica Airways	Virginia					Washington Dulles	1994	1995	
USAir	Arizona					Phoenix Sky Harbor	1979	1997	Renamed US Airways
Utah Pacific Airways	Utah					Ogden	1931	n/a	
Uvalde Aero Service	Texas					Uvalde	1965	1977	Operated Lockheed L-12 Electra Junior, Piper Navajo, Piper Twin Comanche
V
Vagabond Air Travel Club	Ohio						1970	1974	Air travel club. Operated DC-6B, L-188 Electra
Vail Airways	Colorado						1966	1968	Founded by Gordon Autry
Val-Air Lines	Texas					Mercedes	1950	n/a	Feeder service. Operated Beech Bonanza, Ryan Navion
Valdez Airlines	Alaska					Anchorage	1980	1984	Merged with Air North to form Liberty Air
Valdosta Phoenix Airlines	Georgia					Valdosta	1972	1973	
Vale International Airlines	Tennessee			VIN		Nashville	1979	1980	
Valley Airlines	California					Oakland	1968	1974	Merged with Ram Airways to form Pacific Northwest Airways
Valley Airlines	Maine					Fort Kent	1981	1989	Renamed Northeast Express
Valley Airpark Commuter Service	Colorado					Denver	1975	1977	
Valley Catalina Airlines	California					Van Nuys	1981	1981	
Valley Isle Aviation	Hawaii					Kahului	1965	1967	
ValuJet Airlines	Georgia		J7	VJA	CRITTER	Atlanta	1993	1997	Merged into AirTran Airways
Vance Air Services	Montana					Great Falls	1928	n/a	Founded by Clare Vance. Operated Stinson Detroiter
Vance International Airways	Washington					Boeing Field	1960	1970	Briefly known as Charter International Airlines. Became McCulloch International Airlines
Vanguard Airlines	Missouri		NJ	VGD	VANGUARD AIR	Kansas City	1994	2002	Low cost /low fare airline
Varney Air Lines	Idaho					Salt Lake City	1926	1934	Merged into United Airlines
Vee Neal Airlines	Pennsylvania					Latrobe	1980	1983	renamed Jetstream International Airlines
Vercoa Air Service	Illinois					Danville	1964	1975	Renamed Britt Airways
Vero Monmouth Airlines	Florida		VM	VMA	VERO MAMMOUTH	Vero Beach	1973	1975	Operated de Havilland Heron, Martin 4-0-4
Veterans Air Lines	New Jersey					Newark	1945	n/a	Operated DC-3, DC-4
Via Airlines	Florida		VC	SRY		Orlando	2015	2019	Established as Charter Air Transport. Operated Embraer Brasilia, Embraer ERJ 145
Viair	New Jersey					Newark	1935	1935	Charter and resort air service
ViaAir	Florida		VC	SRY	STINGRAY	Beckley Raleigh County	1997	2019	Went bankrupt
Victory Aviation Services International	New York					New York-LaGuardia	1995	1999	
Viking Air Lines	California					Lockheed Air Terminal	1946	1956	Established as Aero-Van Express
Viking Air Transport	California					Glendale, California	1946	1947	In 1947 became non operating parent company of Aero-Van Express
Viking International Airlines	Minnesota		VO	VIK	VIKING	Minneapolis–Saint Paul	1969	1994	Acquired by Eagle Air International
Vintage Airways	Florida					Kissimmee	1992	1995	Founded by Richard Branson operated in 1940s livery
Vintage Props and Jets	Florida		VQ	VPP	VINTAGE	New Smyrna Beach	1992	2008	Went bankrupt
Virgin America	California		VX	VRD	REDWOOD	San Francisco	2004	2018	Acquired by Alaska Airlines
Virgin Islands Seaplane Shuttle	US Virgin Islands			VSS	WATERBIRD	Saint Croix	1982	1989	
Virginia Air Cargo	Maryland					Baltimore–Washington	1974	1979	Operated BN islander, Short Skyvan
Visco Flying Service	California					Los Angeles	1964	1967	Operated shuttle service. Renamed Imperial Airlines
Viscount Air Service	Arizona			VCT	VISCOUNT AIR	Tucson	1992	1996	Operated Boeing 727, Boeing 737
Vision Airlines	Nevada		V2	RBY	RUBY	North Las Vegas	1994	2017	Established as Vision Air. Incorporated in Virginia. Revoked by State
Volunteer Airlines	Tennessee					Berry Field	1954	1955	Tennessee intrastate airline briefly operated by Capitol Airways
Voyager 1000	Indiana			VOY	VOYAGER	Indianapolis	1965	1973	Air travel club part of the genesis of ATA Airlines
VQ Airlines	Florida					Daytona Beach	1970	1973	Airline division of Volusia Aviation Service
Vroman Aviation	Texas						1965	1972	Established as Champs Aviation
W
Walatka Air Service	Alaska						1930	1930	
Walker's International	Florida		XW	WRC		Fort Lauderdale	1982	2003	Established as Jet Hansa Corporation in 1967
Warsaw Aviation	Indiana					Warsaw	1971	1971	Third-level services. Operated Piper Twin Comanche, Piper Apache
Waterman Airlines	Alabama					Mobile	1946	1948	Operated Lockheed Lodestar, DC-3
Washington Airlines	Maryland					Baltimore–Washington	1968	1969	STOL operation
Washington Flying Service	Virginia					Washington	1928	1929	Scenic flights
Washington-Baltimore Airways	Maryland					Baltimore–Washington	1961	1971	Operated Beech 18, Piper Apache
Watermakers Air	Florida					Fort Lauderdale	1999	2018	Operated Cessna Grand Caravan
Waterman Airlines	Alabama						1945	1947	Intrastate carrier
Watertown Airways	South Dakota					Watertown	1935	1936	
Webber Airlines	Alaska					Ketchikan Harbor Seaplane Base	1970	1979	Founded by Jim Webber. Merged with Flair Air to form Southeast Alaska Airlines. Operated DHC Beaver], Grumman Goose
Wedekind-Schmidlapp Flying Service	Ohio					Hook Field	1932	1961	Founded by Larry Schmidlapp and George "Pappy" Wedekind. Operated Waco VKS-7
Wedell-Williams Air Service Corporation	Louisiana					Patterson	1929	1936	Founded by Jimmy Wedell and Harry Palmerston Williams. Acquired by Eastern Air Lines. Operated Lockheed Vega 5B
Wes-Tex Aircraft	Texas					Lubbock Airport	1964	1971	Operated Piper Navajo, Piper Twin Comanche, Piper Cherokee
West Central Airlines	Nebraska					Omaha	1966	1971	Operated de Havilland Dove, Cherokee Six, Cessna 182
West Coast Air Cargo	Oregon			WCC	WEST COAST	Portland–Troutdale	1982	1999	Cargo carrier
West Coast Airlines	Washington		WC			Seattle–Tacoma	1941	1968	Merged with Pacific Air Lines and Bonanza Air Lines to form Air West which was then renamed Hughes Airwest in 1970
WestAir Airlines	California					Fresno Yosemite	1978	1986	Established as Stol Air Commuter. Renamed WestAir Commuter Airlines
WestAir Commuter Airlines	California		OE	SDU	SUNDANCE	Fresno Yosemite	1978	1992	Formerly Stol Air Commuter, to Mesa Air Group
Westair Transport						Seattle	1947	1960	Supplemental air carrier stopped flying in 1960 after IRS seized assets, a dba of Aviation Corp. of Seattle
Westates Airlines	California; New Jersey		WS	WSA	WESTATES	Los Angeles; Atlantic City	1984	1995	Renamed Gray Line Air
Western Air Express	California					Los Angeles	1926	1930	Operated Douglas M-2, Fokker F-10
Western Air Express Texas	Texas					Midland	2004	2016	Operated Beech Queen Air 70
Western Air Industries	California					Redding	1960	1960	Aerial firefighting carrier. Renamed Aero Union. Operated B-25 Mitchell
Western Air Service	Nebraska					Eppley Airfield	1930	1930	Operated Ford Trimotor
Western Air Stages	Colorado					Grand Junction	1972	1976	Operated Beech Queen Air, Riley Dove 400
Western Aircraft	Idaho					Gooding	1964	1971	Operated Beech 18, Piper Apache
Western Aircraft Salvage	California					Santa Maria	1974	1980	Operated Beech 18, Piper Apache
Western Airlines	California		WA	WAL	WESTERN	Los Angeles	1941	1987	Merged into Delta Air Lines
Western Airlines (2007)	Washington		XP	CXP	RUBY MOUNTAIN	Bellingham	2007	2007	
Western Alaska Airlines	Alaska					Kodiak	1940	1973	Merged with Kodiak Airways to form Kodiak Western Alaska
Western Express Air	Arizona					Laughlin/Bullhead		2007	
Western Pacific Airlines	Colorado		W7	KMR	KOMSTAR	Colorado Springs	1995	1998	
Westflight Aviation	Alaska					Ketchikan	1981	1986	Acquired by Temsco Airlines
WestJet Express	Nevada					Fresno Yosemite	1998	1999	Renamed Allegiant Air
Westward Airways	Nebraska		CN	WWD	WESTWARD	Western Nebraska	2004	2005	
Wheeler Airlines	North Carolina					Raleigh–Durham	1969	1991	Established as Wheeler Flying Service
Whidbey Flying Service	Washington					Oak Harbor	1964	1969	Founded by Wes Luipen. To Puget Sound Airlines
Wien	Alaska					Anchorage	1982	1984	
Wien Air Alaska	Alaska		WC	WAA		Anchorage	1973	1982	Several name changes over the years, final name Wien
Wien Airways of Alaska	Alaska					Anchorage	1926	1935	Established as Northern Air Transport
Wien Alaska Airways	Alaska					Anchorage	1935	1968	Merged with Northern Consolidated Airlines to form Wien Consolidated Airlines
Wien Consolidated Airlines	Alaska					Anchorage	1968	1973	Formed by the merger of Wien Alaska Airlines and Northern Consolidated Airlines
Wilbur's Inc.	Alaska					Anchorage	1984	1992	
Wild Goose Flying Service	Texas					San Antonio	1984	1992	
Wildblue Yonder-Aero Taxi	Idaho					Lemhi County	1998	1998	
Williams Air	New Jersey						1981	1983	Operated BN Islander
Willis Air Service	New Jersey					Teterboro	1945	1949	Cargo carrier run by Charles F. Willis Jr., Alaska Airlines CEO 1957–1962
Wilmington-Catalina Airline	California					Hamilton Cove Seaplane Base	1931	1942	Certificated by the Civil Aeronautics Board in 1939, owned by the Wrigley family.
WinAir Airlines	Utah			WNA	WINAIR	Salt Lake City	1997	1999	
Winged Cargo Company	Pennsylvania					Northeast Philadelphia	1931	1946	Freight service. Operated DC-3 towing Waco CG-4
Wings Air	Georgia			WAI		Atlanta	2008	2010	
Wings Airways	Pennsylvania		WQ	WAW	WING SHUTTLE	Blue Bell Wings Field	1977	1991	
Wings Express	California					Burbank	1993	1993	Cargo carrier. Acquired by Ameriflight
Wings of Alaska	Alaska		K5	SQH	SASQUACH	Juneau	1982	2017	Founded by Dean Williams and Billy Bernhardt. Established as Southeast Skyways. Operated Cessna 207, DHC-3 Otter
Wings West Airlines	California		RM	WWM	WINGS WEST	McChesney Field	1979	1998	Later operated as American Eagle, then merged into Simmons Airlines
Winkys Fish Airlines	Alaska					Anchorage	1990	1990	Operated Boeing 727. Salmon transport
Winnipesaukee Airlines	Florida					Tampa	1976	1977	
Wisconsin Central Airlines	Wisconsin					Clintonville	1946	1952	Renamed North Central Airlines
Wise Airlines	Texas		4W			San Angelo	1983	1985	Operated Beech 99, Twin Otter. Went bankrupt
Woodley Airways	Alaska					Merrill Field	1932	1945	Renamed Pacific Northern Airlines
Woods Air Service	Alaska					Palmer	1961	2000	
World Airways	Georgia		WO	WOA	WORLD	Atlanta	1948	2014	
World American Airlift	California					Fresno Yosemite	1968	1970	
World Wide Airlines	Alaska					Anchorage	1956	1962	Established as Pearson-Alaska Airlines in 1948. Operated DC-4, C-46, L-749, L-1049
Worldwide Airlines	Illinois					Chicago Midway	1983	1986	Subsidiary of Carefree Vacations Inc.
Wrangler Aviation	North Carolina					Piedmont Triad	1973	1991	Established as Bluebell Aviation in 1969. Renamed Tradewinds Airlines
Wright Airlines	Ohio		FW	WRT	WRIGHT	Cleveland Burke	1966	1983	Went bankrupt
WTC Air Freight	New Jersey						1967	1987	Acquired by BAX Global
Wyoming Air Service	Wyoming					Cheyenne	1930	1937	Renamed Inland Air Lines. Operated Stinson Junior, Boeing 247D
Wyoming-Montana Air Lines	Wyoming					Casper–Natrona	1930	1938	Renamed Inland Air Lines in 1938
X
Xtra Airways	Florida		XP	CXP	CASINO EXPRESS	Houston-Hobby	1987	2021	Founded as Casino Express Airlines commenced operations in 1989. Rebranded as Avelo Airlines.
Y
Yankee Airlines	Massachusetts					Pittsfield	1962	1968	Acquired by Executive Airlines. Operated de Havilland Dove
Yosemite Airlines	California		JE			Columbia	1975	1981	
Your Florida Air							2005	2005	never launched
Yukon Air Service	Alaska					Fairbanks	1967	1973	Founded by Roger Dowding. Renamed Air North
Yutana Airlines	Alaska					Anchorage	1987	1994	Renamed Alaska Central Express
Yute Air	Alaska		4Y	UYA		Bethel	2004	2017	
Yute Air Alaska	Alaska					Bethel	1974	2000	Established as Bob Harris Flying Service. Renamed Flight Alaska
Z
Zantop Air Transport	Michigan					Willow Run	1956	1966	Took over the certificate of Coastal Air Lines in 1962. To Universal Airlines
Zantop Airways	Michigan			JTZ	JETZAN	Detroit	1968	1981	Part 298 operator that became Orion Air
Zantop Flying Service	Michigan					Willow Run	1946	1956	Became Zantop Air Transport
Zantop International Airlines	Michigan		VK	ZAN	ZANTOP	Willow Run	1972	2005	
Zetta Jet	California					Burbank	2015	2017	Established as Advanced Air Management
Zia Airlines	New Mexico					Las Cruces	1972	1980	Renamed Air New Mexico. Air ambulance services
Zimmerly Air Lines	Idaho					Boise	1942	1946	Renamed Empire Airlines
Zoom Zoom Air	California					Oakland	1973	1974	Renamed from Arabesco Air Renamed Air Charter West. Operated Basler BT-67

== See also ==
- List of airlines of the United States
- List of airports in the United States
- List of defunct airlines of Guam
- List of defunct airlines of Puerto Rico
- List of defunct airlines of the United States Virgin Islands
