= MHK =

MHK can refer to:

- Manhattan Regional Airport, Kansas, United States, IATA code MHK
- Member of the House of Keys, the Lower House of Tynwald, the Isle of Man Parliament
