= Shavano =

Shavano may refer to:

- Mount Shavano, a mountain peak near Salida, Colorado
- Shavano (train), formerly operated by the Denver and Rio Grande Western Railroad
- Shavano Park, Texas
- Shavano Air, an American airline
