= Michael J. Smith Field =

- IATA: none; ICAO: KMRH; FAA LID: MRH

Summary
- Airport type: Public
- Owner: Beaufort-Morehead City Airport Authority
- Serves: Beaufort, North Carolina
- Elevation AMSL: 11 ft / 3 m
- Coordinates: 34°44′01″N 076°39′38″W
- Interactive map of Michael J. Smith Field

Runways
Direction	Length		Surface
Direction	ft	m	Surface
3/21	4,191	1,277	Asphalt
8/26	5,003	1,525	Asphalt
14/32	4,001	1,220	Asphalt

Statistics (2006)
- Aircraft operations: 43,800
- Based aircraft: 75
- Source: Federal Aviation Administration

Michael J. Smith Field (ICAO: KMRH, FAA LID: MRH) is a public airport located one mile (2 km) north of the central business district of Beaufort and northeast of Morehead City, in Carteret County, North Carolina, United States. It is owned by the Beaufort-Morehead City Airport Authority.

The airport is named in memory of astronaut Michael J. Smith, a native of Beaufort who died in the Space Shuttle Challenger disaster. It was formerly known as Beaufort-Morehead City Airport.

Although most U.S. airports are assigned the same three-letter location identifier by the FAA and IATA, Michael J. Smith Field is assigned MRH by the FAA but has no designation from the IATA (which assigned MRH to May River Airport in Papua New Guinea).

== Facilities and aircraft ==
Michael J. Smith Field covers an area of 400 acres (160 ha) which contains three asphalt paved runways:

- 3/21 measuring 4,191 x 150 ft. (1,277 x 46 m)
- 8/26 at 5,003 x 100 ft. (1,525 x 30 m)
- 14/32 at 4001 x 100 ft (1220 x 30 m) (runway closed)

For the 12-month period ending June 5, 2015, the airport averaged 120 operations per day: 86% general aviation, 9% air taxi and 6% military. At that time there were 54 aircraft based at this airport of which 54 were single-engine, 7 were multi-engine, and 2 were jet airplanes.

== Historical airline service ==
Piedmont Airlines was serving the airport by 1948 with a daily Douglas DC-3 flight operating direct service to Raleigh/Durham, NC, Greensboro, NC, Winston-Salem, NC, Cincinnati, OH and other en route destinations. Wheeler Airlines, a commuter air carrier, served the airport during the mid-1970s with Cessna 402 flights to Charlotte, NC, Norfolk, VA, and Raleigh/Durham NC.

== See also ==
- List of airports in North Carolina
