= Sunworld International Airlines =

American airline

IATA	ICAO	Call sign
—	SWI	Sunworld
- Commenced operations: 1996; 30 years ago
- Ceased operations: 2004; 22 years ago
- Operating bases: Cincinnati/Northern Kentucky International Airport
- Headquarters: Fort Mitchell, Kentucky
- Key people: William Yung

Sunworld International Airlines was an airline based in Fort Mitchell, Kentucky, USA. Its main base is Cincinnati/Northern Kentucky International Airport. It suspended operations in November 2004, but is seeking to re-establish itself under new ownership. The airline should not be confused with Sunworld International Airways which was a scheduled passenger airline based in Las Vegas, Nevada.

== Code data ==
- ICAO Code: SWI
- Callsign: Sunworld

== History ==
The airline was established by William Yung, owner of hotels in the US and the Caribbean, in 1995 and started operations in July 1996. Flights were suspended in November 2004 when aircraft were repossessed. It has sold 62% of shares to California start-up SilverSky.

== Services ==
Sunworld International Airlines operated flights from Cincinnati and Cleveland to the Cayman Islands. For a short time, the airline also offered flights from Indianapolis to Philadelphia, Hartford, Connecticut and Kansas City Missouri.

== Fleet ==
As of January 2005 the Sunworld International Airlines fleet included:

- 1 Boeing 727-200

== See also ==
- List of defunct airlines of the United States
