= Sunworld International Airways =

US airline

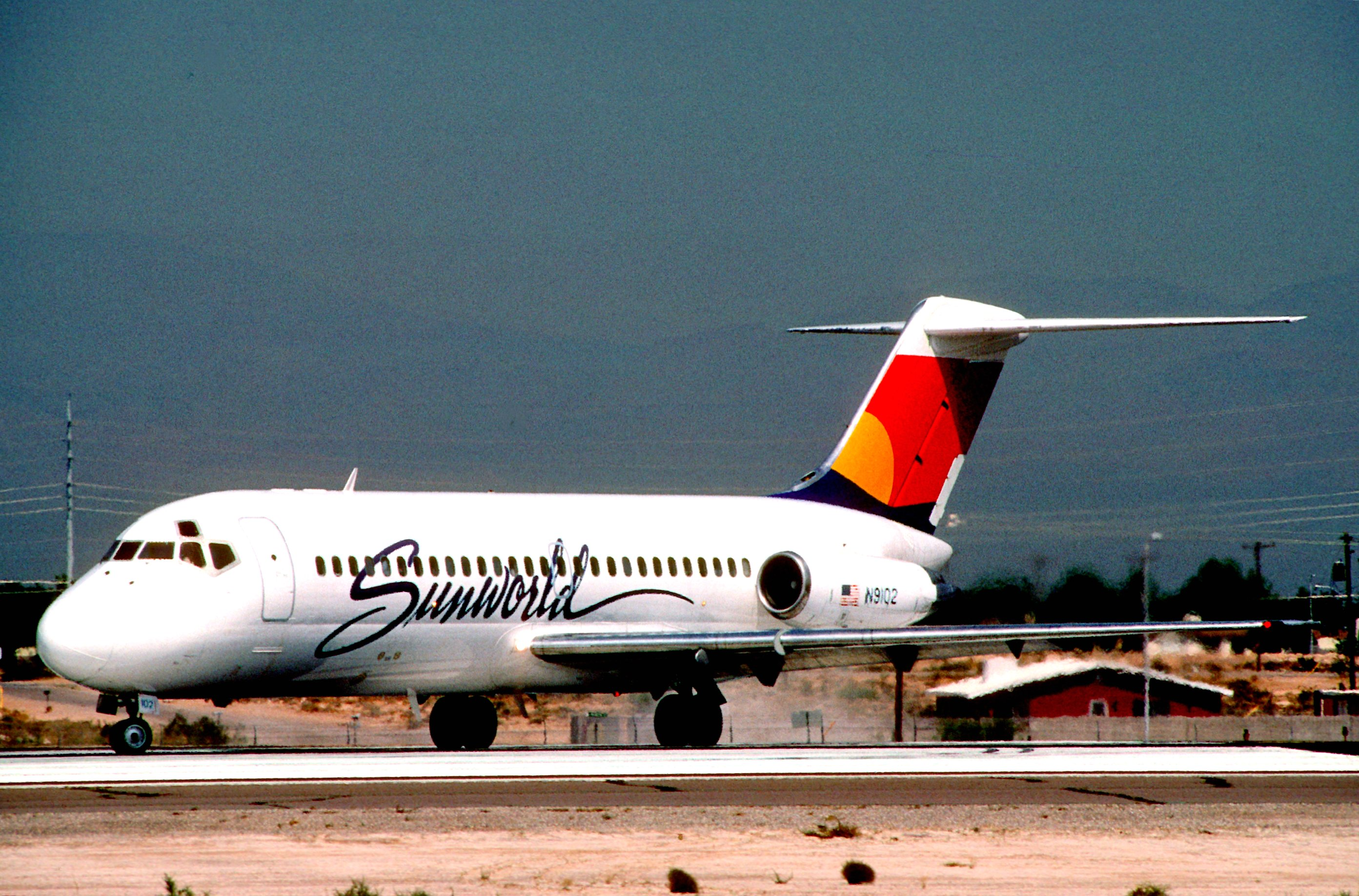
IATA	ICAO	Call sign
JK	SWI	Sunworld
- Founded: 1981; 45 years ago
- Commenced operations: 1983; 43 years ago
- Ceased operations: 1988; 38 years ago
- Fleet size: 13
- Destinations: 12
- Headquarters: Las Vegas, Nevada

Sunworld International Airways was a small, all-jet airline that operated in the western USA from 1983 until liquidated in 1988. Towards the end of operations it was known as Sunworld Airlines.

== History ==
Sunworld International Airways (not to be confused with Sunworld International Airlines) was founded by ex-managers of Bonanza Air Lines as Jetwest International Airways in 1981, but initiated operations on May 27, 1983, under the Sunworld name with Douglas DC-9-10 series jet aircraft. Although the word "international" appears in the airline's name, it appears that Sunworld never operated any international flights on a scheduled basis.

Sunworld was based in Las Vegas, Nevada with Las Vegas McCarran International Airport (LAS) initially serving as the hub for the airline. In 1984, the airline was operating nonstop service between Las Vegas and Oakland (OAK), Oklahoma City (OKC), Ontario (ONT), San Jose (SJC), Tucson (TUS) and Tulsa (TUL) with a total of 12 daily nonstop flight departures from Las Vegas operated with Douglas DC-9 jets.

In 1985, the airline initiated Boeing 737-300 jet service. Sunworld also operated British Aerospace BAe 146-100 jet aircraft at one point.

In early 1987, Sunworld was operating its primary hub at the Reno-Tahoe International Airport (RNO) with nonstop flights between Reno and Boise (BOI), Burbank (BUR), Las Vegas (LAS), Ontario (ONT), Portland (PDX), San Diego (SAN), Seattle (SEA) and Spokane (GEG) in addition to direct service between Reno and Oklahoma City (OKC) and Tulsa (TUL) via Las Vegas. However, by September 1987 Las Vegas had once again become the primary hub for the airline with up to 21 nonstop flight departures a day while Reno had become a secondary hub with up to 12 nonstop flight departures a day.

== Destinations in September 1987 ==
According to the airline's system timetable dated September 14, 1987, Sunworld was serving the following destinations:

- Boise, Idaho (BOI)
- Las Vegas, Nevada (LAS) (primary hub)
- Oakland, California (OAK)
- Oklahoma City, Oklahoma (OKC)
- Ontario, California (ONT)
- Portland, Oregon (PDX)
- Reno, Nevada (RNO) (secondary hub)
- San Diego, California (SAN)
- Seattle, Washington (SEA)
- Spokane, Washington (GEG)
- Tucson, Arizona (TUS)
- Tulsa, Oklahoma (TUL)

Besides flights to and from Las Vegas and Reno, the above referenced system timetable also lists point-to-point nonstop service between San Diego and Tucson as well as direct, no change of plane service between several other city pairs in the airline's route system via either Las Vegas or Reno.

== Previous destinations ==
Other cities previously served by Sunworld during its existence included:

- Burbank, California (BUR)
- Los Angeles, California (LAX)
- Milwaukee, Wisconsin (MKE)
- Omaha, Nebraska (OMA)
- San Jose, California (SJC)

== End of operations ==
In January 1988, virtually all flights were cancelled due to financial reasons and the only scheduled route being flown was Las Vegas-Omaha. Nonscheduled charter work was also being undertaken at this time. By April 1988, Sunworld had filed for Chapter 11 bankruptcy protection and with debts of over US$15 million, operations could not be sustained. On November 7, 1988, the airline was liquidated.

== Fleet details ==
- 3 - Douglas DC-9-14
- 1 - Douglas DC-9-15
- 2 - McDonnell Douglas DC-9-31
- 4 - Boeing 737-300 (Boeing 737-3Q8)
- ? - British Aerospace BAe 146-100 (formerly operated by Royal West Airlines)

== See also ==
- List of defunct airlines of the United States
