= Manhattan Regional Airport =

Airport in Manhattan, Kansas, United States

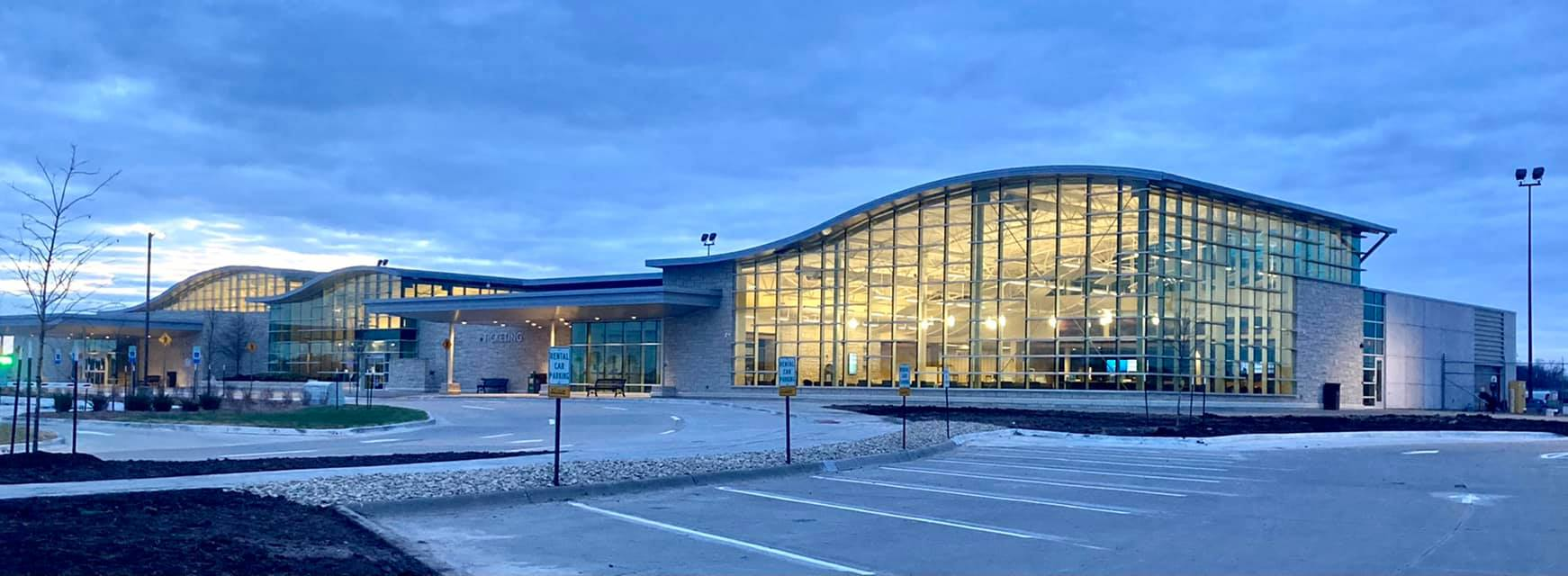
- IATA: MHK; ICAO: KMHK; FAA LID: MHK

Summary
- Airport type: Public
- Owner: City of Manhattan
- Serves: Manhattan, Kansas
- Elevation AMSL: 1,066 ft (325 m)
- Coordinates: 39°08′28″N 096°40′18″W
- Website: FlyMHK.com

Map
- Location within Kansas Location within the United States

Runways
Direction	Length		Surface
Direction	ft	m	Surface
3/21	7,000	2,134	Concrete
13/31	5,000	1,524	Concrete

Statistics (2025)
- Passenger boardings: 83,220
- Aircraft operations: 30,568
- Sources: Federal Aviation Administration, City of Manhattan

Manhattan Regional Airport (IATA: MHK, ICAO: KMHK, FAA LID: MHK) in Riley County, Kansas, United States, is the second-busiest commercial airport in Kansas. Owned by the city of Manhattan, Kansas, the airport is located about five miles southwest of downtown Manhattan. American Airlines via its American Eagle affiliate serves the airport with five daily regional jet flights, with two nonstops to Chicago O'Hare International Airport (ORD) and three nonstops to Dallas/Fort Worth International Airport (DFW). The airport is also used for general aviation and for planes chartered by the military and college sports teams (the airport is four miles east of Fort Riley and eight miles southwest of Kansas State University's athletic complex).

The National Plan of Integrated Airport Systems for 2013–2017 categorized it as a primary commercial service airport (more than 10,000 enplanements per year).

Traffic at the airport multiplied after American Eagle began its service in August 2009. Between 2008 and 2012, Federal Aviation Administration records show that annual passenger boardings (enplanements) at the airport grew from 16,489 to more than 69,000. A record 83,220 people boarded aircraft at MHK in 2025.

== History ==
Manhattan Regional Airport, located in Riley County, Kansas, began construction on June 13, 1939, with the establishment of temporary grass runways. The airport was officially dedicated in November 1940. The first terminal, named "Manhattan Municipal Airport," opened on April 19, 1953, with a speech by U.S. Senator Frank Carlson, coinciding with the start of Continental Airlines DC-3 flights.

Since the 1950s, Manhattan Regional Airport has been served by several airlines. In 1979, the southwest end of runway 3-21 was extended by 1,500 feet, and the entire runway was widened by 50 feet to accommodate new Boeing 737 service operated by Frontier Airlines. The original runway, constructed in 1963, includes 13 inches of concrete, with additional concrete added in 1979 at the southwest end and widened areas. However, due to the location of a localizer antenna, only a 660-foot area for runway safety is built at the departure end of runway 21, compared to the compliant 1000-foot area at the end of runway 3. As a result, runway 21 has a landing length of 7,000 feet, whereas takeoffs and landings from runway 3 are limited to 6660 feet.

The current airline terminal opened in two phases between 2015 and 2016, replacing the 1997 terminal. The $18 million project has three jet bridge parking positions from two gates, and can accommodate aircraft as large as the Boeing 737 or Airbus A320. The new terminal has more space for ticketing, baggage claim, car rental, and security screening.

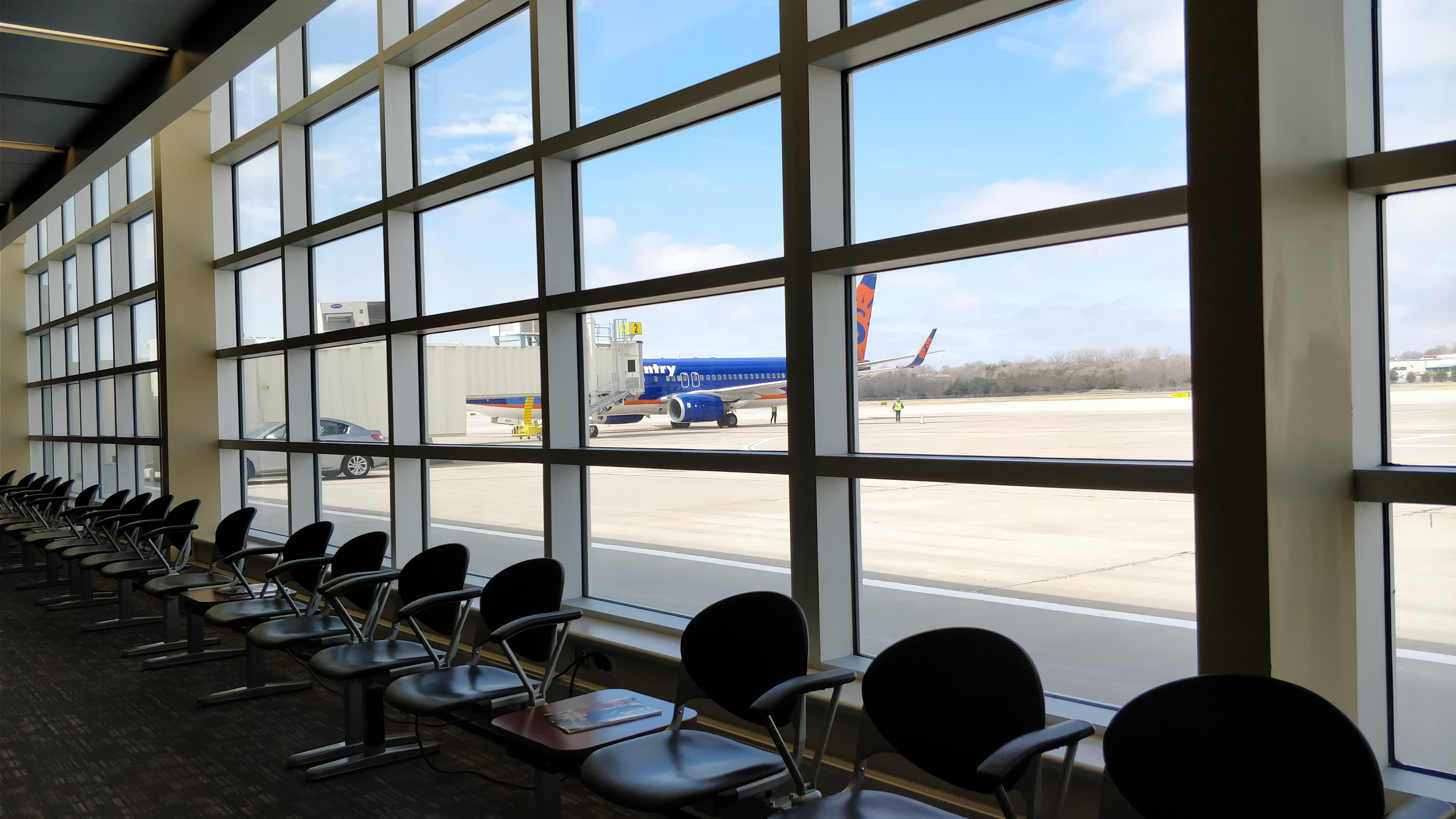
Sun Country 737-800 at Gate 2 for a Big 12 athletics charter

=== Historical airline service ===
Continental Airlines

The first scheduled airline at Manhattan was Continental Airlines, which began Douglas DC-3 flights in April 1953. Manhattan was added as a stop on a route between Denver and Kansas City, a route that made a total of ten stops at smaller cities throughout Colorado and Kansas. Continental pulled out in 1961, replaced by Central Airlines.

Central Airlines

Central Airlines provided service from 1961 through 1967 by picking up the former Continental Airlines route between Denver and Kansas City with stops at Manhattan and several other points. Central also used DC-3 aircraft.

Capitol Air Service

Capitol Air Service (ICAO airline designator CPX, not to be confused with Capitol Air), was headquartered in Manhattan from the 1960s until the company ceased flights in 1989, after having twice been grounded by the FAA for multiple safety and records keeping violations. Capitol Air provided point-to-point air service to cities throughout northeastern Kansas.

In the 1970s Capital Air, an air taxi service, suffered two crashes, one with fatalities. In the 1980s one of its aircraft was tipped over by a gust of wind while waiting for take off clearance, and another aircraft, a Twin Otter, clipped the side of a terminal building, both incidents occurring at Kansas City International Airport.

At its height Capitol Air served Manhattan; Salina, KS (SLN); Topeka, KS (FOE); Lawrence, KS (LWC); and Kansas City, MO (MCI) using two 20-passenger de Havilland Canada Twin Otters and smaller Cessna 402 aircraft. From mid-1987 until early 1989 Capitol Air operated as Braniff Express on behalf of Braniff Airways.

Frontier Airlines

Starting when it merged with Central Airlines in 1967, the original Frontier Airlines flew from Manhattan to Salina, Wichita (ICT), and Denver (DEN) westbound and to Topeka (FOE) and Kansas City eastbound on 44-seat Convair CV580s. Beginning in late 1979 Frontier replaced their Convair turboprop aircraft with Boeing 737-200 jets on the same routings. Direct service to Chicago O'Hare International Airport with a stop at Lincoln was also added with the 737s. All Frontier service ended in 1983 being replaced by Air Midwest.

Trans Central Airlines

Trans Central briefly operated from Manhattan to Oklahoma City and Dallas/Ft. Worth in 1982 using Fairchild Swearingen Metroliner commuter aircraft.

Air Midwest

Beginning in 1982, Wichita-based Air Midwest flew from Manhattan to Kansas City and Salina on 17-passenger Swearingen Metroliner IIs. From 1986 through 1988 Air Midwest was an Eastern Air Lines affiliate, operating as Eastern Express and flew 30-passenger Saab 340As in the Eastern paint scheme to Kansas City. When Eastern closed its hub at Kansas City in late 1988, Air Midwest signed a new codeshare agreement with the second incarnation of Braniff Airlines, which had started a small hub at MCI, and began flights as Braniff Express'to Kansas City on Swearingen Metroliner IIs. This was in addition to Capitol Air's service to Kansas City also operating as Braniff Express. Braniff filed bankruptcy and shut down in late 1989 and Air Midwest reverted to operating under their own branding to Kansas City. Air Midwest was also operating a codeshare agreement with TWA as Trans World Express at the major carriers' St. Louis hub. For a short time in 1990 nonstop TWExpress flights were operated from Manhattan to St. Louis using Embraer EMB 120 Brasilia aircraft.

Mesa Air Group

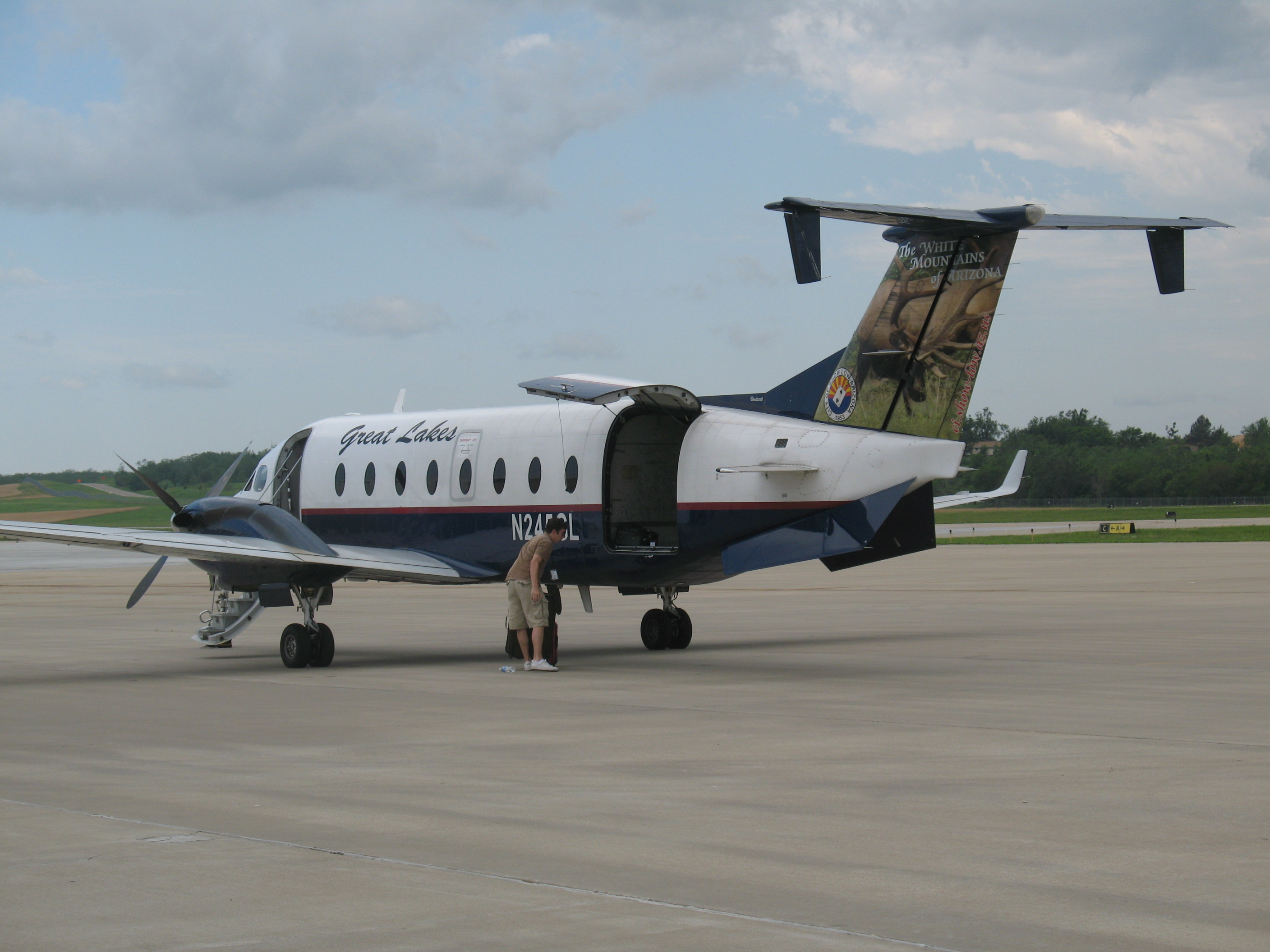
A Great Lakes Airlines Beechcraft 1900D at Manhattan Regional in 2009

In 1991 Air Midwest was sold to the Mesa Air Group of Arizona. Subsequently, Air Midwest (a Mesa Air Group subsidiary), acting under a codeshare agreement with US Airways and operating as US Airways Express, served Kansas City, Missouri from Manhattan, Kansas with three daily flights using 19-passenger Beechcraft 1900D turboprop aircraft. The service ended in 2008 when Mesa Air Group shut down the Air Midwest division and all Essential Air Service contracts and flights operated by Mesa were closed.

Great Lakes Airlines

Great Lakes Airlines flew to Manhattan between March 30, 2008, and April 7, 2010, taking over after Mesa left and ending service after American Eagle announced additional expansion. There were three daily flights, most days to Kansas City, and initially two daily flights (with one stop) to Denver. The flights to Denver were later cut back to once daily. Great Lakes used Beech 1900Ds.

Allegiant Air

Allegiant Air operated a short-lived jet service with twice-weekly nonstop flights between Manhattan and Phoenix–Mesa Gateway Airport from November 7, 2013, to February 23, 2014.

American Eagle

American Eagle began service on August 26, 2009, with two daily nonstop flights to the Dallas/Fort Worth International Airport (DFW). In 2010 new service to Chicago O'Hare International Airport (ORD) was added as well as a third flight to DFW. Flights to DFW are currently operated by Envoy Air with Embraer ERJ-175 regional jets. Flights to ORD are currently flown by Air Wisconsin with Canadair CRJ200 regional jets. Flights to ORD were discontinued in April 2020 but returned in May 2021.

== Facilities ==
Manhattan Regional Airport covers 680 acres (275 ha) at an elevation of 1,066 feet (325 m).

In 2017 the airport had 24,260 aircraft operations: 81% general aviation, 4% airline, 9% air taxi and 6% military. 42 aircraft were then based at this airport: 33 single-engine, 7 multi-engine and 2 jet.

The airport has two concrete runways: 3/21 is 7,000 by 150 feet (2,134 x 46 m) and 13/31 is 5,000 by 75 feet (1,524 x 23 m). There are five taxiways and two parking aprons; they can support aircraft as large as the Boeing 767 or C-17 but city ordinance requires aircraft with a landing weight of greater than 110,000 contact the airport director prior to landing or they will be in violation of the city ordinance.

Three navigation systems and multiple lighting systems guide aircraft; an FAA control tower and two Aircraft Rescue and Fire-Fighting (ARFF) vehicles round out the airside support. Any aircraft with 30 passenger seats or more, or over 110,000 lb (50,000 kg) landing weight requires prior permission from the Airport Director to land. Aircraft as large as the Boeing 767 land occasionally as charters for the military or sports teams.

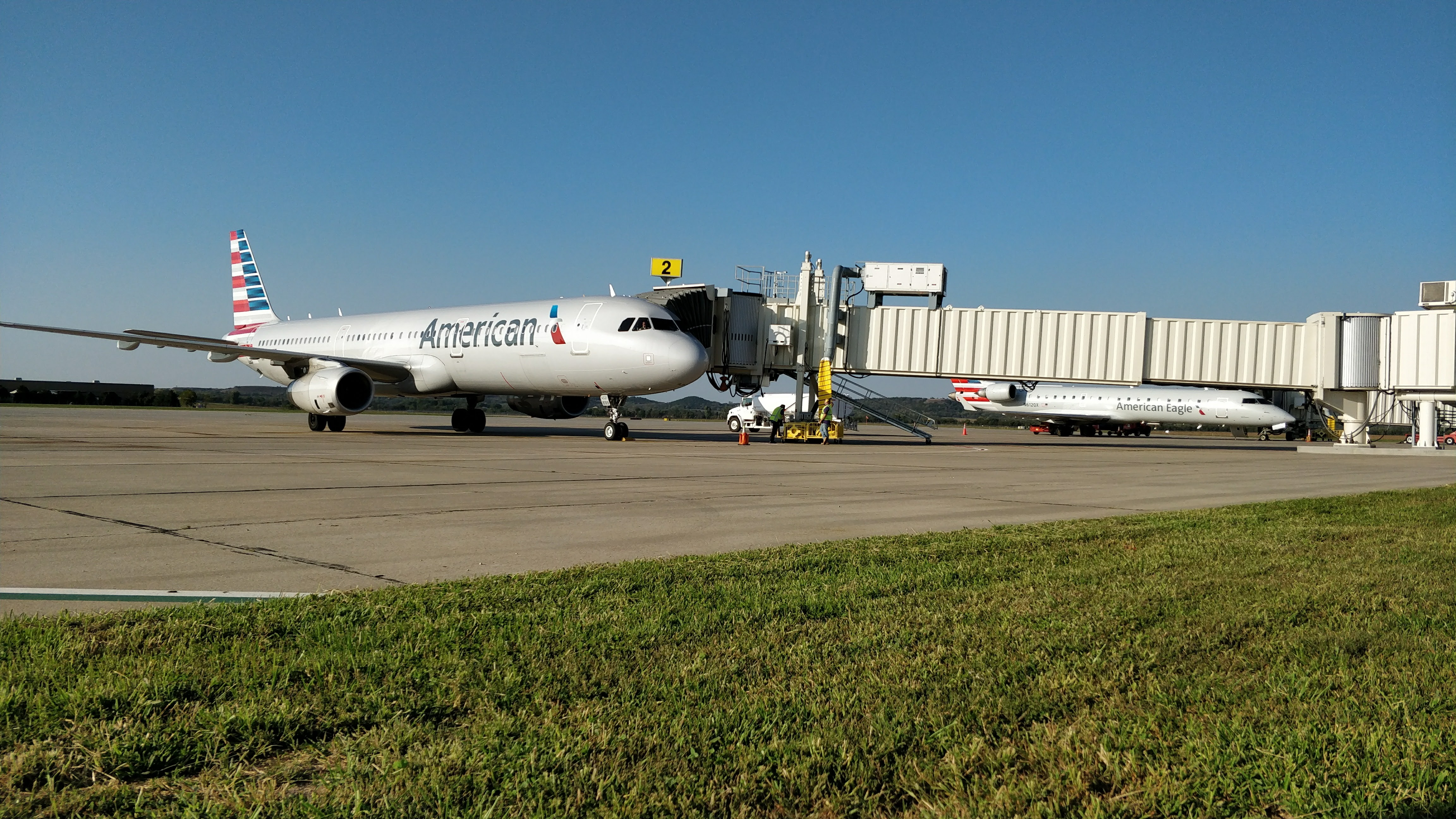
An American Airlines Airbus A321 gated at the new Manhattan, Kansas terminal. This flight was a Big 12 Conference athletics charter flight bringing the TCU Horned Frogs to Manhattan for an NCAA college football game.

=== Services ===
The first phase of the airport's new 42,000-square-foot (3,900 m^{2}) terminal facility opened in March 2015, housing American Airlines, Hertz Rent-a-Car, Enterprise Car Rental, and other services. The expanded facility includes two gates, an expanded TSA security checkpoint, and additional passenger circulation space. There are also accommodations for a future airport restaurant. The terminal replaces a 11,700-square-foot (1,090 m^{2}) terminal opened in 1997, which was demolished and replaced due to increased commercial airline traffic. The terminal is located at 5500 Skyway Drive, adjacent to the FAA control tower and FBO.

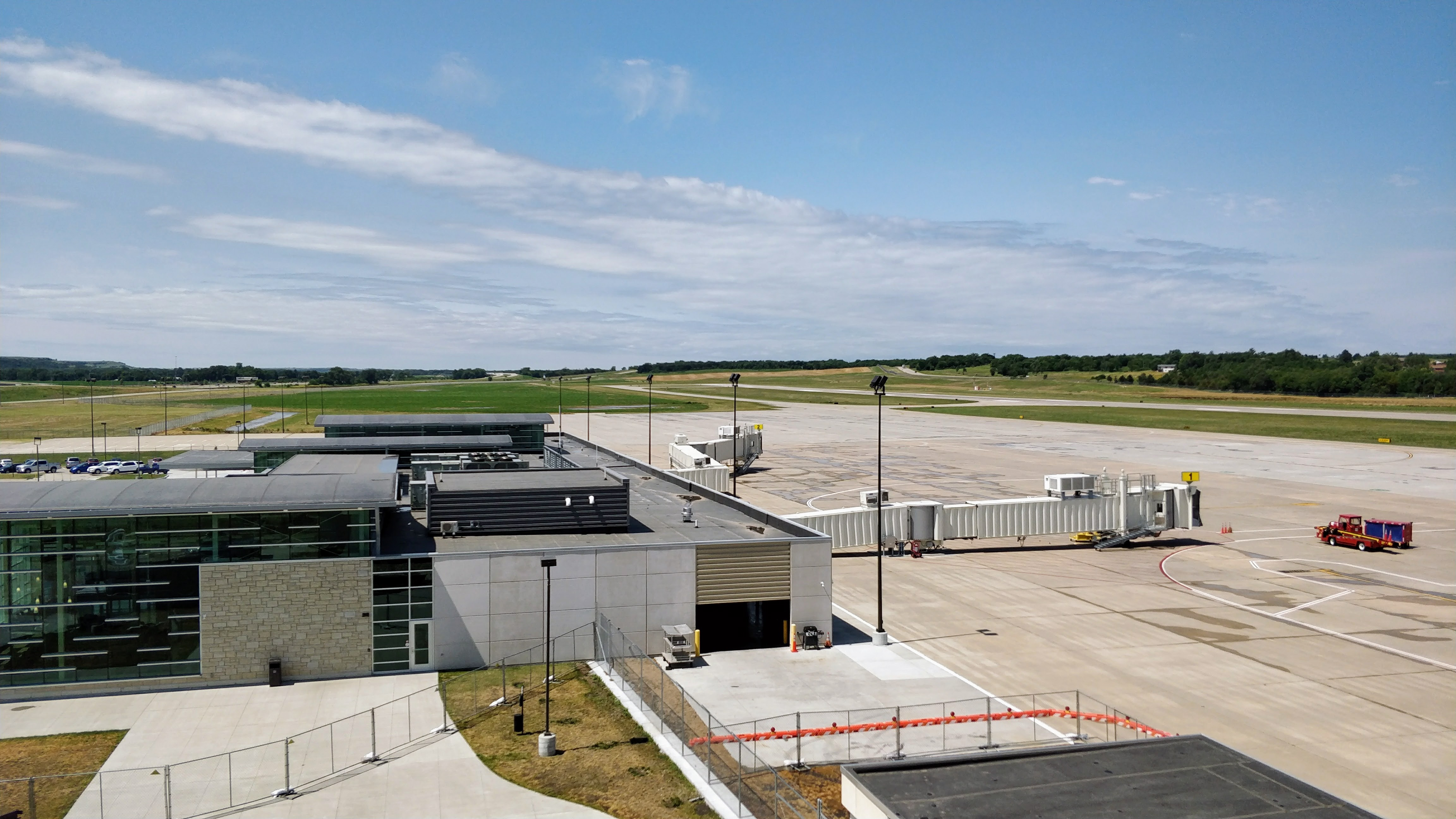
A photo taken from the air traffic control tower showing the layout of the terminal ramp area and both passenger boarding bridges in the new terminal

The FBO facility, next to the passenger terminal, is occupied by Kansas Air Center, which has been operating at the Manhattan airport since May 1989. It is a full service FBO, providing fuel, charter service, flight instruction, aircraft rental and management services.

An older 4,100-square-foot (380 m^{2}) terminal building built in 1958 is now home to the airport administrative offices. This facility is at 1725 South Airport Road, 1 mile (2 km) east of the passenger terminal.

Heartland Aviation uses an 8,000-square-foot (700 m^{2}) stone maintenance hangar, constructed in 1940, next to the old terminal building for servicing and repairing aircraft. The Kansas State University Flying Club, an airport tenant for over 50 years, has office space in this facility for instruction and flight planning.

Other facilities include a fire station, 48 hangars, storage areas, a fuel farm, and an air traffic control tower. Eight new hangars were completed in 2025, marking the airport's first expansion of aircraft capacity in more than 20 years.

The airport has three parking lots adjacent to the passenger terminal. Paid parking began in February 2021, replacing free parking.

== Airline and destinations ==
Airlines	Destinations
American Eagle	Chicago–O'Hare, Dallas/Fort Worth

Destinations map
Destinations from Manhattan Regional Airport

=== Statistics ===
Carrier shares (April 2021 - March 2022)
Carrier	Passengers (arriving and departing)
Envoy Air	71,340(54.07%)
SkyWest	60,610(45.93%)

Top domestic destinations (April 2021 - March 2022)
Rank	Airport name	Passengers	Airline
1	Dallas/Fort Worth	44,000	American
2	Chicago–O'Hare	21,000	American

== Accidents and incidents ==
- 28 May 1963: Standard Airways Flight 388C, registration N189S, Lockheed L-1049G Super Constellation on a military charter flight, impacted the ground short of the runway at Manhattan Municipal Airport in Manhattan, Kansas when, just before landing, reverse pitch engaged on the number three engine, dipping the right wing which made contact with the ground. The aircraft was destroyed by fire but only after the six crew and 64 passengers were safely evacuated. No crew and only one passenger were seriously injured. The cause was traced to "improper maintenance practices and inspection procedures."

== See also ==
- List of airports in Kansas

== Other sources ==
- Reuters/American Airlines press release
- Essential Air Service documents (Docket DOT-OST-2003-15483) from the U.S. Department of Transportation:
  - Order 2004-2-14 (February 17, 2004): selects Air Midwest, Inc., a wholly owned subsidiary of Mesa Air Group, Inc., d/b/a US Airways Express, to provide subsidized essential air service (EAS) for a two-year period at Manhattan and Salina, Kansas, at a combined annual subsidy rate of $721,605.
  - Order 2006-3-15 (March 15, 2006): re-selecting Air Midwest, Inc., a wholly owned subsidiary of Mesa Air Group, Inc., d/b/a US Airways Express, to provide subsidized essential air service (EAS) for the two-year period beginning March 1, 2006, at Manhattan and Salina, Kansas, at a combined annual subsidy rate of $974,008.
  - Order 2007-12-25 (December 21, 2007): re-selecting Air Midwest, Inc., a wholly owned subsidiary of Mesa Air Group, Inc., d/b/a US Airways Express to provide subsidized essential air service (EAS) at Manhattan and Salina, Kansas, for a total annual subsidy of $1,619,566 for the two-year period beginning March 1, 2008.
  - Order 2008-2-5 (February 1, 2008): prohibiting Air Midwest, Inc. a wholly owned subsidiary of Mesa Air Group, Inc., d/b/a US Airways Express from suspending its subsidized essential air services at Manhattan and Salina, Kansas, until Great Lakes Aviation, Ltd. begins full replacement service, and selecting Great Lakes to provide those services for a new two-year period at an annual subsidy rate of $1,997,237.
  - Order 2009-11-25 (November 30, 2009): requesting proposals from carriers interested in providing essential air service (EAS) at Salina, Kansas, for the two-year period beginning April 1, 2010, with or without subsidy. With respect to this order, we are soliciting proposals for service to Salina only. In the past, the communities of Salina and Manhattan were handled under the same contract because the flights were historically routed Salina-Manhattan-Kansas City. However, on or about August 26, 2009, American Eagle inaugurated subsidy-free regional jet service from Dallas-Fort Worth to Manhattan. American Eagle provides two daily nonstop round trips in the Manhattan-Dallas-Fort Worth market with 50-seat Embraer ERJ-145 regional jets on a subsidy-free basis. That level of service fully meets Manhattan's EAS requirements, so, consistent with longstanding program practice, we will simply rely on American Eagle's subsidy-free service and not request proposals. Despite not receiving an EAS subsidy, Manhattan will remain in the EAS program, and, should American Eagle subsequently decide to file a notice to leave, the department would initiate a carrier-replacement proceeding by issuing an order holding in American Eagle and requesting proposals for replacement service from all interested carriers.
