= Standard Airways =

US supplemental airline (1945–1969)

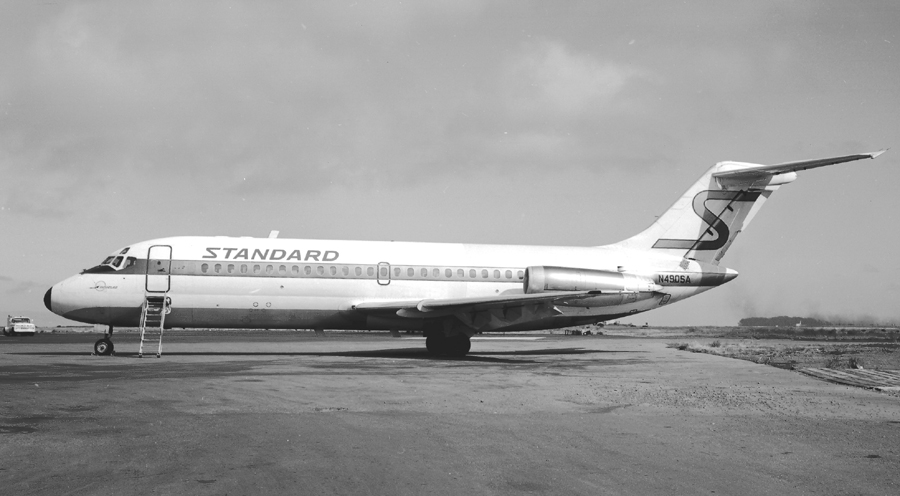
- DC-9 at San Francisco 1968. The cheatline and "S" on the tail were gold with red borders. "Standard" was in red. See External links a brief video and color photo of the livery
IATA	ICAO	Call sign
FD^{(1)}	FD^{(1)}	-
- Founded: November 1945
- Commenced operations: April 1946
- Ceased operations: August 1, 1969
- Fleet size: See Fleet below
- Parent company: Pike Corporation of America (1966–1968)
- Headquarters: Seattle, Washington; Miami, Florida; San Diego, California; United States
- Founder: Shields B. Craft; Natalie Y. Gray

Notes
- (1) IATA, ICAO codes were the same until the 1980s

Standard Airways operated intermittently from 1946 through 1969 as a small supplemental air carrier (earlier known as an irregular air carrier or a nonscheduled carrier) a type of US airline regulated by the Civil Aeronautics Board (CAB), the now-defunct US federal agency that tightly regulated airlines from 1938 to 1978. From 1964 onward, a supplemental air carrier was a charter airline. Until 1964, such airlines were charter/scheduled hybrids and Standard Airways did operate some scheduled services. The airline went bankrupt in 1964 and did not operate again until 1966 with new investors. It converted to jets but then ceased flying again on August 1, 1969. Many attempts were made to restart the airline until the CAB finally revoked its certificate in 1975.

== History ==
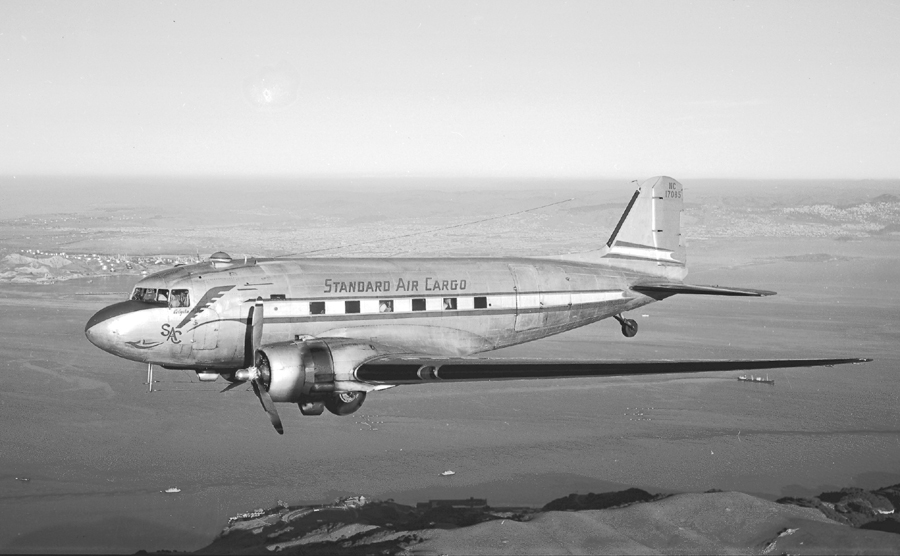
DC-3 demonstrating feathering

=== Early days ===
In November 1945, Shields B. Craft and Natalie Y. Gray created Standard Air Cargo as a 60/40 partnership between them. Both Craft and Gray were involved in military pilot training during World War II, Craft as a pilot instructor, Gray as a dispatcher. They bought a war surplus C-47 and started operations April 1946, engaging in everything from transporting lobsters, flying home returning veterans and transportation between the US mainland and Alaska. Stardard Air Cargo also ran a fixed base operation at San Diego Lindbergh Field, its headquarters. Standard did not consistently operate. For instance, in 1955, it had a single DC-3 that was on six-month lease to California Central Airlines. In 1955 it had a net worth of $145,000 (about $1.7 million in 2024 dollars). By 1953 the carrier was using Standard Airways as a trade name.

=== Pink cloud ===
The airline spent much of 1959 and 1960 not operating, before resuming in the second half of 1960 after its certificate was reissued to reflect a change of status from partnership to a Maryland corporation. Standard started "Pink Cloud" service from the west coast to Hawaii using the limited scheduled part of its supplemental authority, which allowed it to fly 10 flights per month in each direction on any given city pair. The lower half of the aircraft was painted pink, the flight attendants were clad in pink, the champagne was pink and so forth. During this era, the airline moved its operation to Burbank. The June 1962 fleet comprised a Douglas DC-6B, two Lockheed L-749A Constellations and an L-1049G Super Constellation, all owned other than one L-749.^{1962} Standard received a temporary certificate as a supplemental air carrier in 1962 as required by new legislation, but only over the strong dissent of two of the five CAB Board members, who noted, among other things, the carrier's marginal financial state and the fact that new legislation would require the carrier be a pure charter carrier by 1965 yet it depended heavily on scheduled service. The majority noted the carrier's long history and the fact that its financial state, though precarious, was slowly improving and that it was, in fact, pursuing charters.

In May 1963, Standard crashed its L-1049G at Manhattan Municipal Airport in Kansas (see Accidents) while flying for the military, which quickly suspended it from flying military charters. While all on board survived, the cause of the accident was alarming: systemic maintenance issues had resulted in poorly functioning components that permitted a propeller to spontaneously reverse pitch, reversing thrust. Standard stopped operating on 31 January 1964. It declared bankruptcy in February. It emerged from bankruptcy in September an asset-less, employee-less husk.

=== Jet era ===
Standard started flying again on 13 February 1966, on the strength of a promised recapitalization by a company called Southern Pipeliners of Hialeah, Florida which then failed to happen. The brief association gave Standard an identity as a Miami airline. Another group, organized by Frank B. Lynott, an executive of several airlines, the last being Alaska Airlines, stepped in by April, funding over $2 million in equity by June. The airline moved to Seattle. The Pike Corporation of America, run by Thomas P. Pike, specializing in deep sea oil drilling, held a 48% stake. Shields B. Craft got to keep 10%, the balance was mostly held by three investment banks including Bear Stearns. Early in the second half of 1966, the fleet comprised three DC-7s with two DC-9-10s scheduled for delivery later that year. With Standard now healthy, the CAB permanently certificated it as a supplemental air carrier in August 1967. In early 1967, Pike took its stake up to 54%. By November 1967, the DC-7s were gone and Standard had two DC-9s and two Boeing 707s, making it the only supplemental with an all fan-jet fleet. Standard made $11 million in revenue in 1967 (over $100 million in 2024 terms), but lost $1.8 million and Pike was disappointed to find that aircraft financing was not as easy as it was for drilling rigs, a business that was thriving. So at the end of 1967 it decided to shed Standard as well as some other non-core businesses. In March 1968 Pike announced a 45% loss on its $2.7 million investment in Standard. The announcement came just over a month after Standard's 7 February 1968 crash of a 707 at Vancouver in which two people lost their lives due to pilot error (see Accidents).

=== Collapse ===
Standard had net losses of $7 million between September 30, 1967, and September 30, 1969. The DC-9s left the fleet in the fourth quarter of 1968. In 1969 Standard rolled out charter service with Convair 440s, a piston aircraft from the 1950s, which the airline marketed as "Club 44". The airline, without warning, stopped flying on 1 August 1969, the last flight being an early morning flight from Las Vegas to New York, leaving groups scrambling for replacement service. The airline cited two main factors contributing to its collapse:

- Poor aircraft choices (i) the military prioritized airlines with convertible (freight/passenger) aircraft in awarding charters, Standard's 707s were passenger-only. (ii) there was little charter demand for DC-9-10s and it had cost Standard $1 million to get out of the aircraft.
- New scheduled airline group fares reduced demand for Hawaii charters.

among the factors leading to its demise the recent approval of group fares for scheduled airlines (shifting vacation traffic from charter carriers to scheduled) and the fact that its jet aircraft were not convertible (able to also fly cargo), making them less desirable to the military. In 1975, in response to another application to recycle the Standard Airways certificate, the CAB noted there had been at least nine such attempts since the airline stopped operating and the company had been languishing as a "mere shell" in bankruptcy since 24 September 1969. The CAB revoked the certificate.

== Fleet ==
The final Standard Airways fleet was:

- 3 Convair 440s (ex-Eastern Air Lines)
- 3 Boeing 707-138B (ex-Qantas)

== Accidents ==
- 28 May 1963: Flight 388C, registration N189S, Lockheed L-1049G Super Constellation on a military charter flight, impacted the ground short of the runway at Manhattan Municipal Airport in Manhattan, Kansas when, just before landing, reverse pitch engaged on the number three engine, dipping the right wing which made contact with the ground. The aircraft was destroyed by fire but only after the six crew and 64 passengers were safely evacuated. No crew and only one passenger were seriously injured. The cause was traced to "improper maintenance practices and inspection procedures."
- 7 February 1968: A Standard Airways Boeing 707-138B, registration N791SA, operating Canadian Pacific Air Lines Flight CP322 from Honolulu with 9 crew and 52 passengers on board, crashed on landing in fog at Vancouver, British Columbia, Canada. The aircraft veered off the runway and hit several small aircraft before coming to rest with its nose embedded in a building. One member of the cabin crew died, as did an airport employee. While there was no fire, the aircraft was a writeoff. The crew was fatigued, and the captain made an unwise decision to continue landing in poor visibility conditions and it was unclear who was in control of the aircraft in its last moments. External links has a link to photos of the accident.

== See also ==
- Supplemental air carrier
- List of defunct airlines of the United States
