= Streamline Air =

IATA	ICAO	Call sign
—	SRY	Stingray
- Founded: 2010; 15 years ago
- Ceased operations: September 15, 2012; 12 years ago
- Fleet size: 1
- Destinations: 2
- Parent company: Charter Air Transport
- Headquarters: Hanscom Field

Streamline Air was an American regional-airline based at Hanscom Field in Bedford, Massachusetts. The airline started operations on April 4, 2011. Streamline operated four daily flights between its two destinations. Streamline Air, LLC. was a subsidiary of Charter Air Transport. All flights offered by Streamline were designated by the Department of Transportation as Public Charters.

== History ==
Streamline Air started operations on April 4, 2011. All flights were operated by Charter Air Transport, Inc. as a publicly sold air service. All flights were flown with the Embraer EMB 120 Brasilia regional airliner, seating 30.

The aircraft registered N651CT was painted to represent the new Streamline brand.

The service structure was geared toward routine business travel, but the airline considered adding service to seasonal leisure destinations.

On September 15, 2012, Streamline Air ceased operations.

== Destinations ==
Streamline Air offered weekday service between two destinations, Hanscom Field in Bedford, Massachusetts and Trenton-Mercer Airport in Ewing, New Jersey. Effective September 14, 2012, Streamline ceased operations at Trenton-Mercer Airport. Streamline was looking to add Pease Airport in Portsmouth, New Hampshire, but was unable to begin service as desired in September due to aircraft and crew scheduling conflicts.

== Fleet ==
Aircraft	Seats	Notes
Embraer EMB 120 Brasilia	30	owned by Charter Air Transport

Streamline Air used an Embraer Brasilia turbo-prop regional aircraft for all its services.

== See also ==
- List of defunct airlines of the United States
