= Charter Air Transport =

Airline of the United States

IATA	ICAO	Call sign
VC	SRY	STINGRAY
- Commenced operations: March 27, 1997; 28 years ago
- Ceased operations: 2015; 10 years ago
- Hubs: Burke Lakefront Airport
- Fleet size: 5
- Headquarters: Cleveland, Ohio, United States
- Website: charterairtransport.com

Charter Air Transport was a certified part 135 air taxi provider based in Cleveland, Ohio at Burke Lakefront Airport. The airline is licensed by the Department of Transportation to provide privately arranged flights and in addition scheduled public flights. Cleveland's Business Aircraft Group is the parent company of Charter Air Transport.

== History ==
Charter Air Transport, founded by Michael L. Hoyle, has been a licensed air taxi operator since 1998 and offers on demand services to sports teams, casino junkets and other organizations. Aircraft are dispatched to many airports within the United States, Canada, Mexico and the Caribbean for types of specific services. It was one of the first 30-passenger charter operators to achieve DOT 298 authority to fly scheduled flights.

In 2009 and 2010, the airline unsuccessfully bid to assume Essential Air Service federally subsidized scheduled air service to a number of midwestern destinations.

In April 2011 a new operation within the company was introduced on the scheduled public charter branded as Streamline Airlines operating between Hanscom Field in Massachusetts and Trenton-Mercer Airport in New Jersey. The service operated between April 2011 to September 2012. Upon cessation of service, the single dedicated Streamline aircraft was returned to the rest of the CAT fleet.

Mauiva AirCruise Public Charters are also operated by Charter Air Transport.

=== Via Airlines ===
In 2014, an airline named Via Airlines owned by the same holding company as CAT began operating the scheduled Essential Air Service from Raleigh County Memorial Airport in Beckley, West Virginia to Charlotte Douglas International Airport. It also began seasonal unsubsidized service from Charlotte to Northeast Florida Regional Airport. All Via Airlines flights operated Charter Air Transport Embraer EMB 120 Brasilia. Via Airlines filed for voluntary Chapter 11 bankruptcy due to pilot shortage in May 2019.

== Fleet ==
Charter Air Transport serves a variety of on-demand air taxi services with their own fleet of the following aircraft:

Charter Air Transport Fleet:
Aircraft	In Fleet	Orders	Notes
Embraer EMB 120 Brasilia	4	0
Cessna Citation 560XL	1	0

== See also ==
- List of defunct airlines of the United States
