= Wheeler Airlines =

First certified Black-owned airline in the United States

- Commenced operations: 1969; 57 years ago
- Ceased operations: 1986; 40 years ago
- Operating bases: Raleigh–Durham International Airport
- Fleet size: 7
- Key people: Warren Hervey Wheeler

Wheeler Airlines was the operating name of Wheeler Flying Service (WHAA), the first black-owned airline certificated in the US by the FAA, which also helped integrate the pilots at major US air carriers by qualifying a large number of black pilots that were subsequently hired by the nation's major airlines.

== History ==
Wheeler Flying Service was started by Warren Wheeler in 1969, who at the time was a captain at Piedmont Airlines, flying Boeing 737-200 jetliners.

Wheeler Flying Service provided flight training, charter services, aircraft maintenance and courier services for banks using Piper PA-28, PA-24 and PA-32, Beechcraft 18, Britten-Norman BN-2 Islander and Ted Smith Aerostar twin engine prop aircraft. Wheeler Flying Service was certificated by the FAA as an air carrier and a repair station.

In August 1973, Wheeler Flying Service received a grant from the North Carolina Economic Authority to provide scheduled passenger air service from Raleigh/Durham, NC to Morehead City, NC and Elizabeth City, NC using Cessna 402 commuter twin prop aircraft. No other flying company in North Carolina wanted the contract. This was the beginning of Wheeler Airlines.

In 1974, Wheeler Airlines began scheduled passenger flights to Greenville, NC, Asheville, NC and Norfolk, VA. The flights to and from Greenville were requested by the Burroughs-Welcome Drug Company based in the Research Triangle Park and included passengers and a sample box delivered each day to the headquarters from their factory in Greenville. The airline switched to Piper PA-31 Navajo aircraft.

In 1975, Wheeler Airlines briefly operated a de Havilland Canada DHC-6 Twin Otter. On February 1, 1976 Official Airline Guide (OAG) lists scheduled passenger service being flown to Charlotte, NC (CLT), Elizabeth City, NC (ECG), Greenville, NC (PGV), Morehead City, NC (MRH), Norfolk, VA (ORF) and Raleigh/Durham, NC (RDU) with all flights being operated with Cessna 402 twin prop commuter aircraft and the airline using the two letter air carrier code "WR". Wheeler then selected the Beechcraft 99 commuter turboprop aircraft for scheduled service. The airline established joint fares and pass agreements with several major airlines. In 1978 the airline added a larger Fairchild F-27 turboprop with service to New York City and Atlantic City, NJ.

The airline experienced significant growth during the early 1980s as major airlines assigned their jet aircraft to major markets. At its peak in 1984, Wheeler Airlines operated a fleet of five Beechcraft 99's. The routes expanded to Wilmington, Delaware, Washington, DC and Tri Cities, Tennessee. The airline hired a relatively large proportion of black pilots with low flight time, including two black women pilots, the first hired at major airlines. Many of the pilots were trained at Wheeler Flying Service under the Federal CEDA Program. Low time pilots started as copilots in the Beech 99. When they reached 1,200 hours flight time they were assigned to fly courier routes in piston airplanes. Upon the completion of 2,000 hours the pilot could check out as a Beech 99 captain if they could pass an aircraft "check ride" conducted by Wheeler himself. All of the pilots gained valuable turbine time while employed at Wheeler Airlines and the vast majority of Wheeler Airline co-pilots black and white were or still are employed as pilots at major air carriers.

Wheeler introduced a number of firsts in the commuter industry, including one engine turn arounds and engine trend monitoring for turbine powered aircraft.

In the 1980s the airline experienced competition from other commuter air carriers. Wheeler suffered a major blow when Piedmont Airlines selected another commuter airline for code sharing air services. Realizing Wheeler Airlines was going to fail, Warren Wheeler started Wheeler Regional Airlines (WRA) a much smaller version of Wheeler Airlines specializing in underserved mid Atlantic destinations. In 1986 Wheeler Airlines filed for Chapter 11 bankruptcy.

== Destinations ==
According to Wheeler Airlines route maps over the years, the following destinations were served at one time or another, as the carrier added and dropped a number of destinations during its existence:

- Asheville, NC
- Atlantic City, NJ
- Augusta, GA
- Charleston, WV
- Charlotte, NC
- Danville, VA
- Elizabeth City, NC
- Greensboro, NC
- Greenville, NC
- Huntington, WV
- Kinston, NC
- Morehead City, NC - served via the Beaufort-Morehead City Airport in Beaufort, NC
- Newport News, VA
- New York City, NY - served via LaGuardia Airport
- Norfolk, VA
- Parkersburg, WV
- Raleigh/Durham, NC
- Richmond, VA
- Rocky Mount, NC
- Tri-Cities area - Bristol, VA / Kingsport, TN / Johnson City, TN - served via Tri-Cities Regional Airport
- Washington, DC - served via Reagan National Airport
- Wilmington, DE
- Wilmington, NC

== See also ==
- List of defunct airlines of the United States
