= Russia Jet Direct =

IATA	ICAO	Call sign
RD	RYN	-
- Commenced operations: August 2005; 19 years ago
- Ceased operations: September 2005; 19 years ago
- Operating bases: Seattle Tacoma International Airport
- Fleet size: Boeing 757
- Headquarters: Seattle, Washington, United States

Russia Jet Direct was a short-lived regularly scheduled airline offering passenger transportation, including Hot Shot Cargo and Rapid Document Service, between the United States and the Russian Far East. The airline was American-operated. It was based in Seattle, Washington.

The fleet consisted of Boeing 757-200ER aircraft from Ryan International Airlines. Russia Jet Direct flew the only direct route from Houston and Anchorage to Sakhalin Island-Yuzhno.

Russia Jet Direct operated between August and September 2005. The former principals hoped to relaunch the airline as Saber Air.

On January 7, 2007, the flight information display at Ted Stevens Anchorage International Airport displayed a Russia Jet Direct flight arriving from Oakland, California.

== See also ==
- List of defunct airlines of the United States
