= Samoan Airlines =

US international airline (1959–1960)

IATA	ICAO	Call sign
SX^{(1)}	SX^{(1)}	—
- Founded: September 1951; 75 years ago (incorporated in Delaware)
- Commenced operations: July 14, 1959; 67 years ago
- Ceased operations: October 26, 1960; 65 years ago
- Operating bases: Pago Pago
- Fleet size: 1
- Headquarters: Honolulu, Hawaii, United States
- Founder: Lawrence M. Coleman (president)

Notes
- (1) IATA, ICAO codes were the same until the 1980s

Samoan Airlines was a short-lived US international carrier that flew between Pago Pago, American Samoa and Apia in what was then called Western Samoa, with a single Douglas DC-3.

== History ==
Samoan Airlines, Ltd. was incorporated in Delaware in September 1951. Founder and president Lawrence M. (Larry) Coleman, also known as High Chief Tagomailelagi, was the brother of Peter Tali Coleman (who was originally a vice president of the airline), the first Samoan Governor of American Samoa (whose first term encompassed the period of Samoan Airlines' operation).

Larry Coleman applied to the Civil Aeronautics Board (CAB, the now defunct federal agency that then controlled almost all US commercial air transport) for certification of Samoan Airlines to fly between Pago Pago and Apia with a 24-seat Consolidated PBY-5A Catalina flying boat and was rejected in January 1952. At the time, there was no air service to American Samoa. Getting to American Samoa involved a 10-hour boat trip from Apia.

The CAB reconsidered and in 1954, gave Samoan Airlines a five-year temporary certificate for the route, also permitting irregular/charter service to any point within 1,700 statute miles of Pago Pago to increase the revenue potential for Samoan. The airline was not permitted to carry mail - the CAB did not want to subsidize the service. The airline was now part of a plan that would involve the construction of a hotel in Pago Pago.

The airline had an extended gestation. Finally, in December 1958, Samoan leased a DC-3 from Hawaiian Airlines and in January the aircraft flew to Pago Pago, only to be damaged in a February windstorm, apparently for not being properly tied down, but was repaired by Hawaiian. Two senior employees quit, complaining of not being paid. The airline finally launched 14 July 1959.

But Hawaiian repossessed the aircraft the evening of October 26, 1960, making that Samoan's last day of operation. Samoan had failed to pay monthly rent of $3,300 on the aircraft since February. On 8 August 1963, the CAB ordered the airline back in the air by 4 February 1964, or it would lose its certificate, which then expired 23 June 1964.

In a 1963 case determining subsidies for Hawaiian Airlines, the CAB ordered the airline to write off a $65,000 (over $650,000 in 2024 dollars) uncollectable receivable from Samoan.

The CAB listed Honolulu as Samoan's headquarters.

== Fleet ==
- 1 Douglas DC-3

== Destinations ==
- Apia, Western Samoa
- Pago Pago, American Samoa
