= Shavano Air =

IATA	ICAO	Call sign
SHV	—	SHAVANO
- Commenced operations: 1978; 47 years ago
- Ceased operations: 1980; 45 years ago
- Operating bases: Harriet Alexander Field

Shavano Air (IATA code SHV) was an American commuter airline based at Harriet Alexander Field that operated from 1978 to 1980.

== See also ==
- List of defunct airlines of the United States
