= Southeast Airlines =

American airline

IATA	ICAO	Call sign
SL	SNK	—
- Commenced operations: 1999; 27 years ago
- Ceased operations: November 30, 2004; 21 years ago
- Operating bases: Youngstown-Warren Regional Airport
- Frequent-flyer program: Smile Miles
- Fleet size: 10
- Destinations: 13
- Headquarters: Largo, Florida, United States

Southeast Airlines was established in 1993 as Sun Jet International and was founded by Tom Kolfenbach. It was a low fare public charter airline which operated scheduled passenger service in the United States, headquartered in Largo, Florida, flying to various vacation/leisure destinations using eight McDonnell Douglas DC-9-30 and two McDonnell Douglas MD-80 aircraft. It abruptly ceased operations on November 30, 2004, citing high fuel costs as a reason for the decision. The airline's jets featured the "Sun King" logo previously used by the original National Airlines which appeared on the tails of its aircraft.

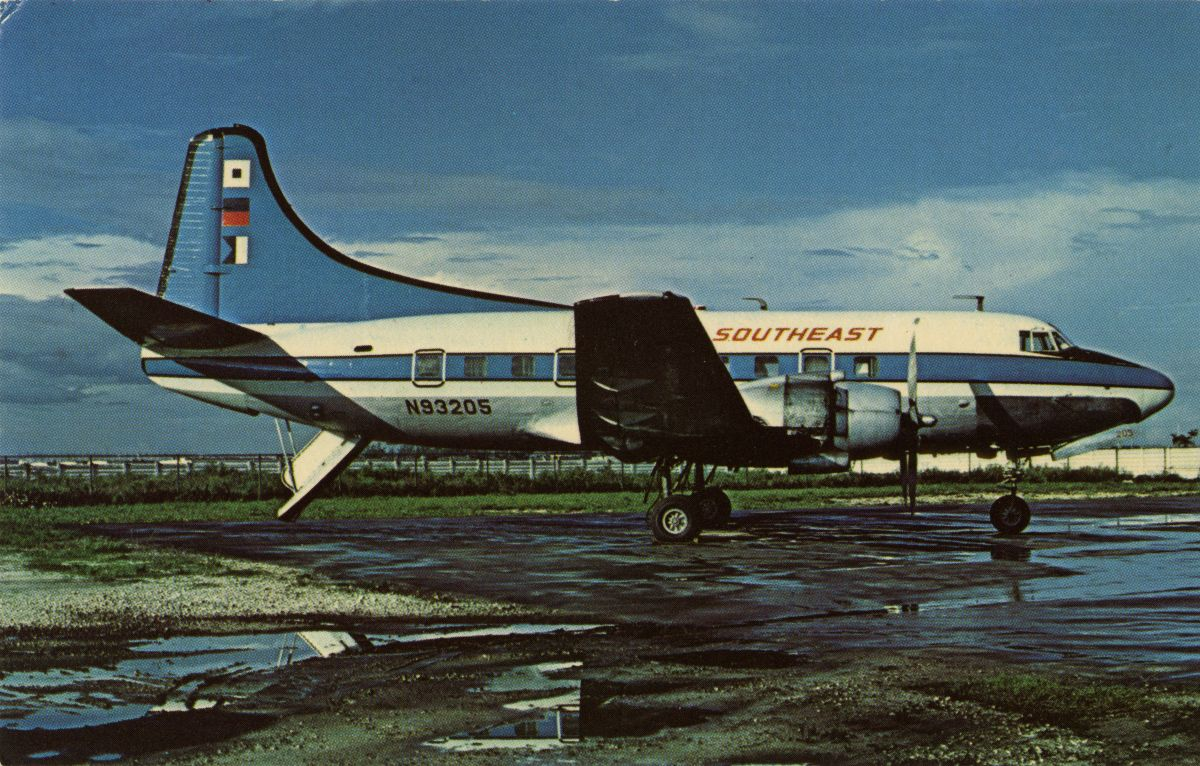
Southeast Airlines Martin 2-0-2A, July 1972

The Southeast Airlines name was also used by another U.S. air carrier that was based in Miami (MIA) using the two letter "NS" airline code which in 1966 was operating scheduled nonstop passenger service between Miami and Key West with Fairchild F-27 turboprop aircraft. During the late 1970s, this version of Southeast was operating scheduled passenger service with Lockheed L-188 Electra turboprop aircraft between Miami and several destinations in the Turks and Caicos Islands including Grand Turk, Providenciales and South Caicos, and by 1979 was operating scheduled passenger service with a Boeing 720 jetliner nonstop between Miami and Aguadilla, Puerto Rico as well as with Fairchild F-27 turboprop aircraft nonstop between Miami and Tampa. This version of Southeast ceased operations during the early 1980s and also operated several Boeing 707 jetliners as well as a Boeing 727-100 cargo freighter jet during its existence.

== Destinations ==
During the early 2000s, Southeast Airlines served the following destinations at different times during its existence:

- United States
  - Florida
    - Fort Lauderdale - Fort Lauderdale-Hollywood International Airport (FLL)
    - Orlando - Orlando International Airport (MCO) - Orlando Sanford International Airport (SFB)
    - St. Petersburg - St. Petersburg-Clearwater International Airport (PIE)
    - Fort Walton Beach, Florida - Destin-Fort Walton Beach Airport (VPS)
    - West Palm Beach - West Palm Beach International Airport (PBI)
    - Fort Myers - Southwest Florida International Airport (RSW)
  - Ohio
    - Columbus - Rickenbacker International Airport (LCK)
    - Youngstown-Warren - Youngstown-Warren Regional Airport (YNG)
  - Nevada
    - Las Vegas - McCarran International Airport (LAS)
  - South Carolina
    - Myrtle Beach - Myrtle Beach International Airport (MYR)
  - North Carolina
    - Wilmington - Wilmington International Airport (ILM) - Charlotte, North Carolina (CLT) - Raleigh-Durham International Airport (RDU) - Morrisville, North Carolina (served via RDU)
  - New Jersey
    - Newark - Newark Liberty International Airport (EWR)
  - New York
    - Newburgh - New York City - Stewart International Airport (SWF)
  - Pennsylvania
    - Allentown - Lehigh Valley International Airport (ABE)
  - Mississippi
    - Gulfport - Gulfport/Biloxi International Airport (GPT)
- Mexico
  - Cancún - Cancún International Airport (CUN)

== Fleet ==
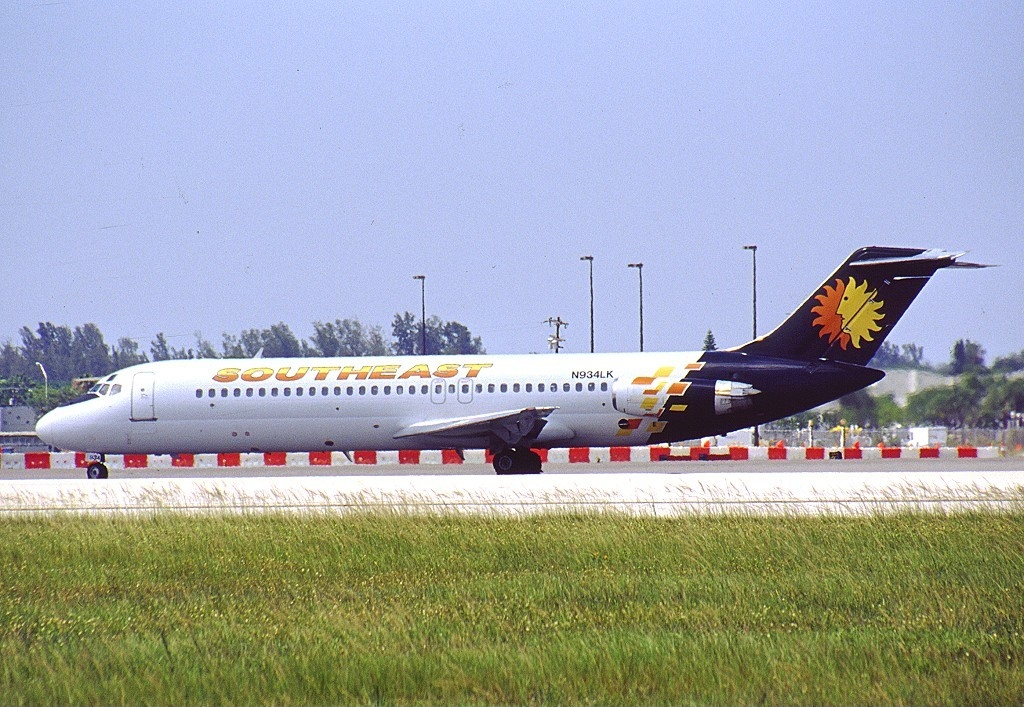
Southeast Airlines McDonnell Douglas DC-9-31

Southeast Airlines operated the following jetliners throughout operations:

Southeast Airlines Fleet
Aircraft	Total
McDonnell Douglas DC-9-30 (including DC-9-31 & DC-9-32 aircraft)	8
McDonnell Douglas MD-80 (including MD-82 & MD-88 aircraft)	2

== In popular culture ==
The airline was featured on the reality TV series The Simple Life, which Southeast executives hoped would give the carrier some exposure.

== See also ==
- List of defunct airlines of the United States
