= Atlantic North Airlines =

American airline

- Founded: March 1993
- Ceased operations: August 1993
- Headquarters: Laconia, New Hampshire, United States

Atlantic North Airlines was a Vermont-based commuter carrier linking several cities in New England and New Jersey; the airline existed from March to August 1993.

== History ==
Atlantic North was formed through the acquisition of SkyMaster Air Taxi of Laconia, New Hampshire, in March 1993. Howard Dean, then governor of Vermont, cut the ribbon at the airlirline's grand opening at Rutland State Airport. The company's four owners were Stephen Cotter, David Mosher, Michael Mole, and Mark Logan.

SkyMaster was itself formed in the mid-1980s and operated charter and air taxi services. Its initial route linked Laconia with Boston. Eventually SkyMaster served cities in New Hampshire, Vermont, Massachusetts, and New Jersey.

The carrier's operations were short-lived and Atlantic North ceased all flights in August 1993, and filed for bankruptcy in September 1993.

== Destinations ==
Atlantic North operated scheduled services to Rutland, Vermont, Laconia, New Hampshire, Keene, New Hampshire, Boston, Massachusetts, and Newark, New Jersey. Keene was utilized as a hub connecting passengers, mail, and cargo between northern destinations and the cities of Newark and Boston. With the exception of a Saturday-only service between Laconia and Rutland, this route network mirrored those operated by SkyMaster Airlines.

== Fleet ==
The carrier operated a fleet of Beechcraft Model 99 aircraft replacing Piper PA-31 Navajo and Cessna 414.

== See also ==
- List of defunct airlines of the United States
