= Harriet Alexander Field =

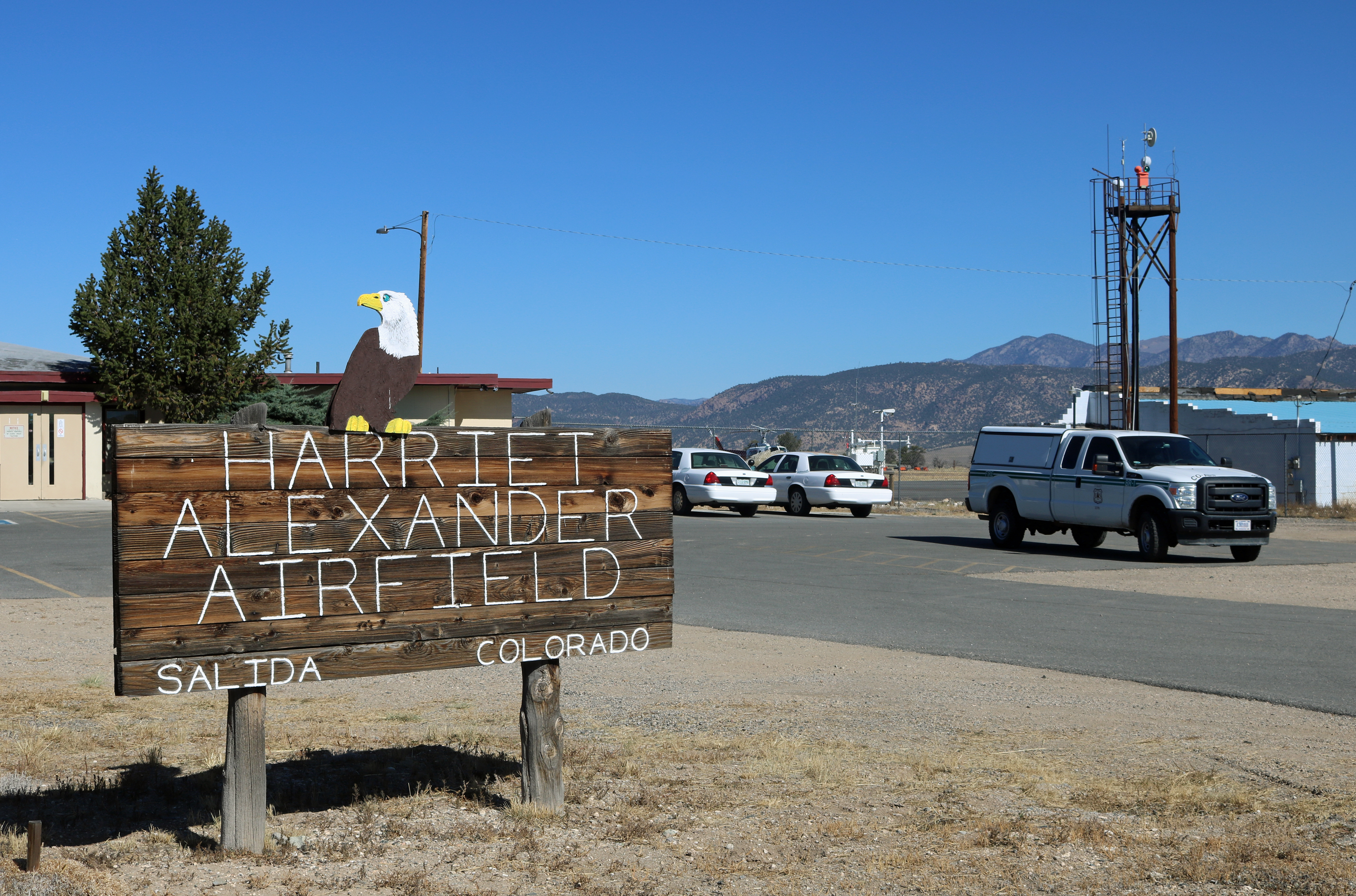
- IATA: SLT; ICAO: KANK; FAA LID: ANK

Summary
- Airport type: Public
- Owner: City of Salida & Chaffee County
- Serves: Salida, Colorado
- Elevation AMSL: 7,523 ft (2,293 m)
- Coordinates: 38°32′18″N 106°02′55″W
- Website: Official website
- Interactive map of Harriet Alexander Field

Runways
Direction	Length		Surface
Direction	ft	m	Surface
6/24	7,347	2,239	Asphalt

Helipads
Number	Length		Surface
Number	ft	m	Surface
H1	36	11	Concrete

Statistics (2006)
- Aircraft operations: 9,653
- Source: Federal Aviation Administration

Harriet Alexander Field (IATA: SLT, ICAO: KANK, FAA LID: ANK) is a public airport two miles west of Salida, in Chaffee County, Colorado, United states. It is owned by the City of Salida and Chaffee County.

Many U.S. airports use the same three-letter location identifier for the FAA and IATA, but Harriet Alexander Field is ANK (formerly 0V2) to the FAA and SLT to the IATA (which assigned ANK to Etimesgut Airport in Ankara, Turkey).

== Facilities ==
Harriet Alexander Field covers 161 acres (65 ha) and has one runway and one helipad:

- 6/24: 7,347 x 75 ft (2,239 x 23 m), surface: asphalt
- H1: 36 x 36 ft (11 x 11 m), surface: concrete

In the year ending April 20, 2006 the airport had 9,653 aircraft operations, 99.5% general aviation and 0.5% military.

== See also ==
- List of airports in Colorado
