= Cleveland Burke Lakefront Airport =

Airport in Downtown Cleveland, Ohio, United States

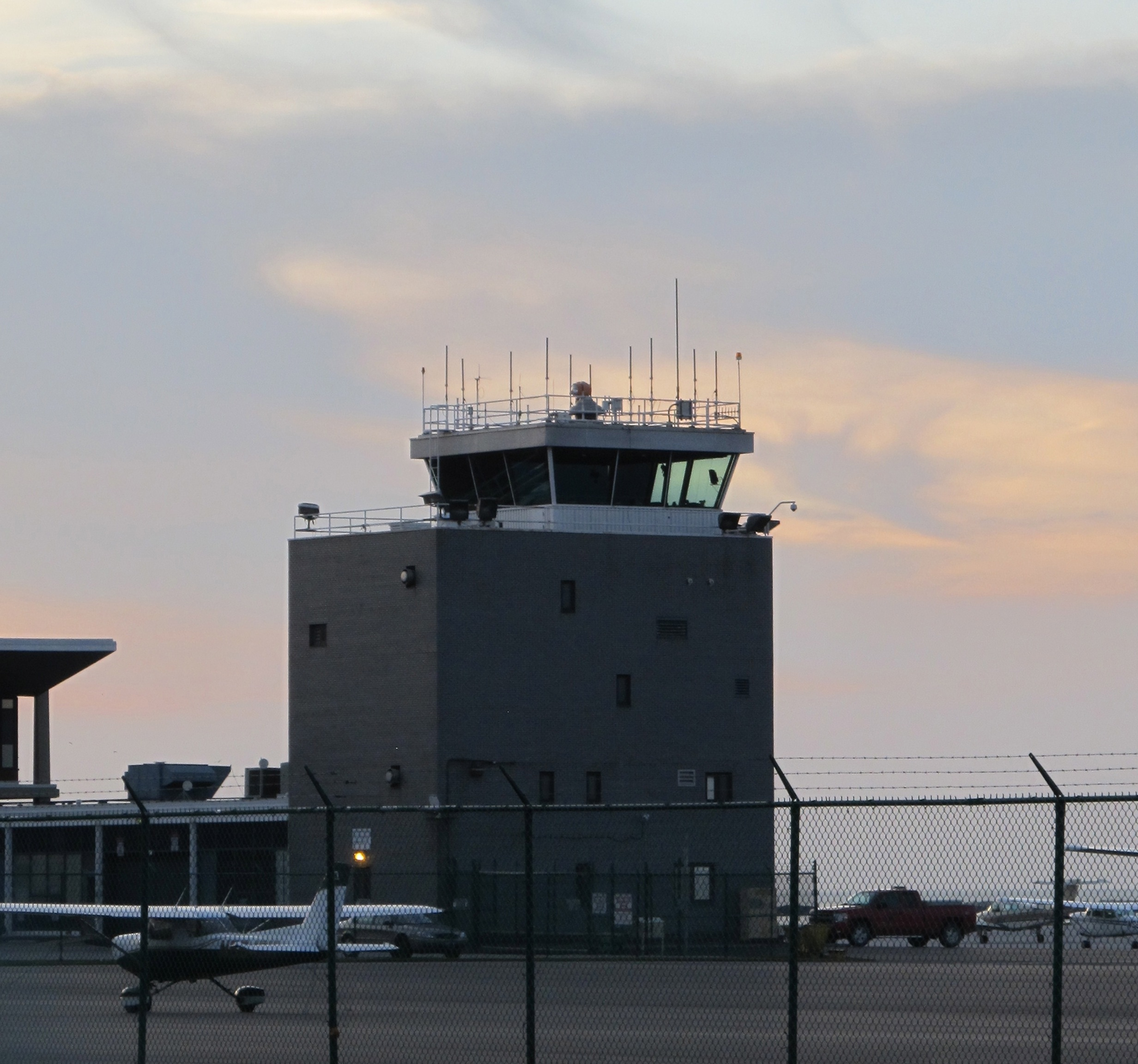
- Cleveland Burke Lakefront Airport control tower
- IATA: BKL; ICAO: KBKL; FAA LID: BKL

Summary
- Airport type: Public
- Owner: City of Cleveland
- Operator: Department of Port Control
- Serves: Greater Cleveland
- Location: Downtown Cleveland, Ohio, U.S.
- Time zone: EST (UTC−05:00)
  - Summer (DST): EDT (UTC−04:00)
- Elevation AMSL: 583 ft (178 m)
- Coordinates: 41°31′03″N 081°41′00″W
- Website: www.burkeairport.com

Map
- Location of airport in Ohio BKL (the United States)

Runways
Direction	Length		Surface
Direction	ft	m	Surface
6L/24R	6,604	2,013	Asphalt
6R/24L	5,197	1,584	Asphalt

Statistics (2019)
- Aircraft operations: 41,245
- Based aircraft: 17
- Sources: FAA & airport website

Cleveland Burke Lakefront Airport (IATA: BKL, ICAO: KBKL, FAA LID: BKL) is a city-owned airport on the shore of Lake Erie, in the northeast part of downtown Cleveland, Ohio, United States. It is classified as a general aviation airport and is an FAA designated reliever to Cleveland Hopkins International Airport (CLE), which is Greater Cleveland's primary airport. In 2018, based on FAA data, Burke Lakefront was the seventh busiest airport in the state of Ohio. It is named after former Cleveland mayor and U.S. senator Thomas A. Burke.

Cleveland Burke Lakefront is one of three airports serving the Cleveland area. The other two are Cleveland Hopkins International Airport and Akron–Canton Airport. The airport is owned by the city of Cleveland, which also operates Hopkins. The airport is operated by the city’s Department of Port Control.

The airport's total operations have decreased over the past two decades from 100,321 in 2000 to 40,185 in 2019. Between 2018 and 2019, operations at Burke increased by 16.5% from the 34,497 operations in 2018. Additionally, the airport is frequently used by professional sports team charter flights due to its proximity to Huntington Bank Field, Progressive Field, and Rocket Arena. The airport also serves as the operational hub for Cleveland Clinic's fleet of air ambulances.

== History ==
The airport is located on what was once a dumping ground for the city's refuse. Eventual plans for the airport were based on a 1923 U.S. Army manual on how to construct an airport.

Originally envisioned in 1927 as a part of a plan for Cleveland's lakefront, a lakefront airport to include "landing places for land and amphibious planes" was included as part of Cleveland's "Official Lakefront Development Plan" in 1946 announced by then City Manager William R. Hopkins (namesake of Cleveland's other, primary airport).

Construction on a dike retaining wall in Lake Erie began in the early 1940s, and by the second half of the decade, the land was strong enough to support a temporary runway.

Cleveland Burke Lakefront Airport (named for then Cleveland mayor Thomas A. Burke) opened in 1947 as the United States' first downtown airport and as its first municipally owned-and-operated airport. Designed to serve as a supplemental airfield for Cleveland Hopkins International Airport, it originally featured a 2,000-foot dirt temporary runway and a small operations facility and hangar. The airport was first maintained by the Army Corps of Engineers, which, over time, began deposition 700,000 cubic yards on all sides of this runway to prepare for a permanent presence.

The airport's draw centered on its proximity to downtown Cleveland, making it easier for tourists and other travelers to access the city.

A federal grant in 1950 from the Federal Airport Act permitted the installation of a 5,200-foot hard-surface runway in 1957.

Lake Central Airlines announced plans to move some operations to Burke in the early 1960s, and a Nike missile facility that had become obsolete was shut down in part because of its potential for interference with planes approaching the airport.

A terminal, control tower, and passenger concourses were constructed between 1957 and 1968 as part of an effort to draw more commercial services and more passengers to the airport. In the 1970s, the airport expanded with new buildings, a new control tower, an additional runway and Aviation High School (which has since closed). In 1981, the airport was home to the first Cleveland Grand Prix and saw cars racing on its runways and approach aprons.

The main terminal of the airport was renovated in 1993 to handle airline and air charter service. In 1998, the larger runway was rehabilitated and an instrument landing system was installed, allowing planes to land in poor weather.

== Airlines and destinations ==
From 2015 to 2021, Ultimate Air served the airport with non-stop service to Cincinnati Lunken. Their operations ended as a result of declining ridership related to COVID-19. However, their return to BKL remains a possibility In previous years, the airline Destination One briefly provided scheduled charter service between BKL and airports near the downtowns of Detroit, Cincinnati, Milwaukee, and Hilton Head, SC. However, this service was short-lived. Wright Air Lines was based at BKL in the 1970s and 1980s, before declaring bankruptcy. From 1957 to 1970 TAG Airlines operated flying mainly to Detroit City Airport, but shut down following a fatal crash. In 1979, Midway Airlines operated service from BKL to MDW in Chicago, before moving their operations to Hopkins. Another airline that served BKL was Cleveland's Cuyahoga County Airport (CGF) based Galaxy Airlines in 1969 using DC-3 aircraft. Galaxy had a total of 6 daily departures from BKL using a routing of CGF-BKL-CMH (Columbus)-LUK (Cincinnati Lunken Airport). The other routing was CGF-BKL-DAY (Dayton) with flights returning on the same routing. The flights between CGF & BKL were 10 minutes long gate to gate.

=== Cargo ===
Airlines	Destinations
AirNet Express	Columbus–Rickenbacker
Central Air Southwest	Dayton, Hamilton (OH), Kalamazoo, Ypsilanti

== Events ==
The airport was the site of the annual Grand Prix of Cleveland, last held in 2007, an IndyCar race which required the airport to be briefly shut down.

Every Labor Day weekend, the airport hosts the annual Cleveland National Air Show attended by 60,000 to 100,000 visitors.

On the evening of Thursday, October 25, 2012, president Barack Obama held a rally on the ramp in front of Air Force One for the 2012 presidential election. He was greeted by a crowd of over 12,000, according to various Cleveland news outlets.

== Facilities and aircraft ==
=== Facilities ===
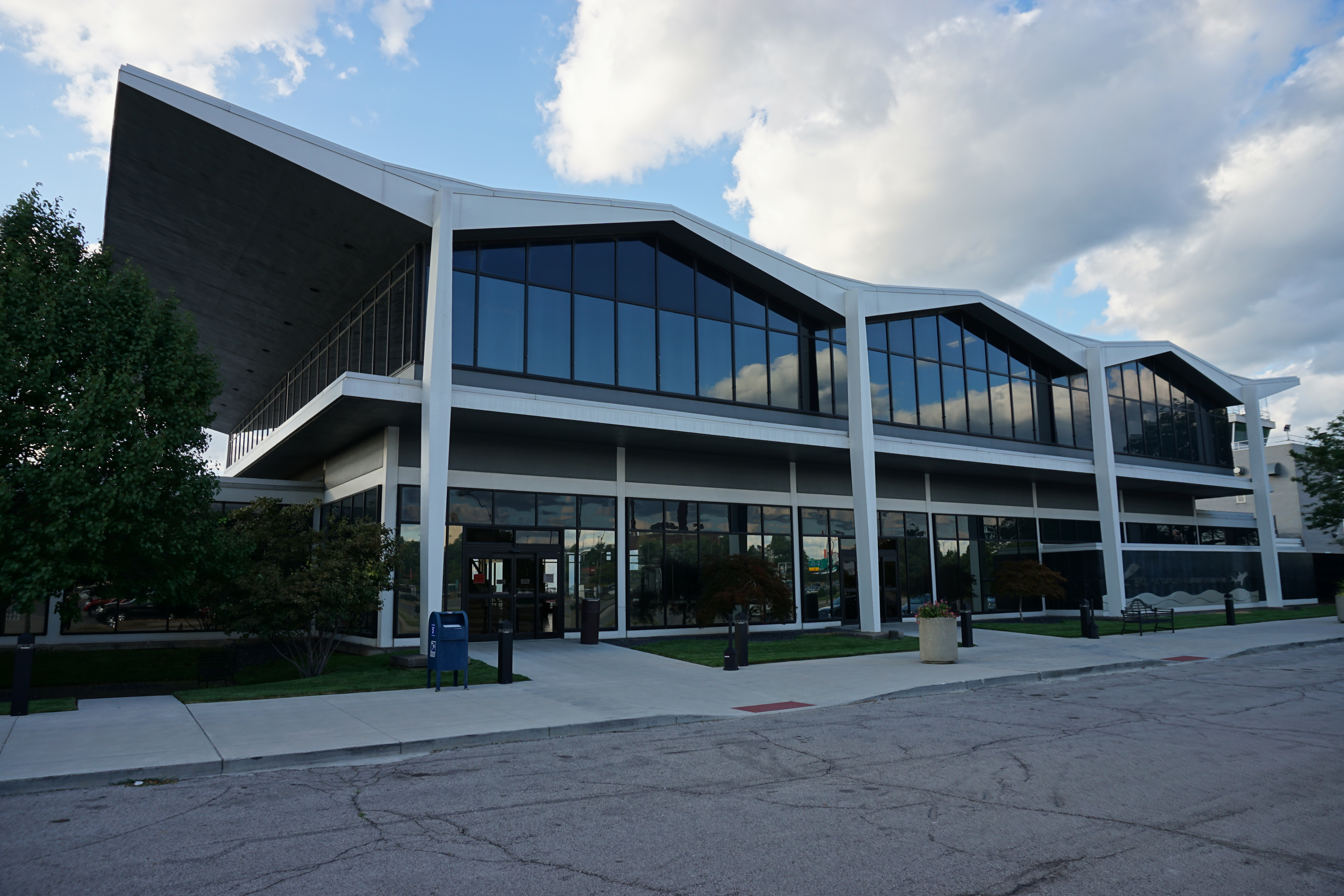
Cleveland Burke Lakefront Airport's terminal

Cleveland Burke Lakefront Airport covers an area of 450 acres (180 ha) which contains two asphalt paved runways: 6L/24R measuring 6,604 x 150 ft (2,013 x 46 m) and 6R/24L measuring 5,197 x 100 ft (1,584 x 30 m). The airfield is fully capable of handling large jets including, 737s, 757s, and A320s along with the smaller general aviation aircraft operations.

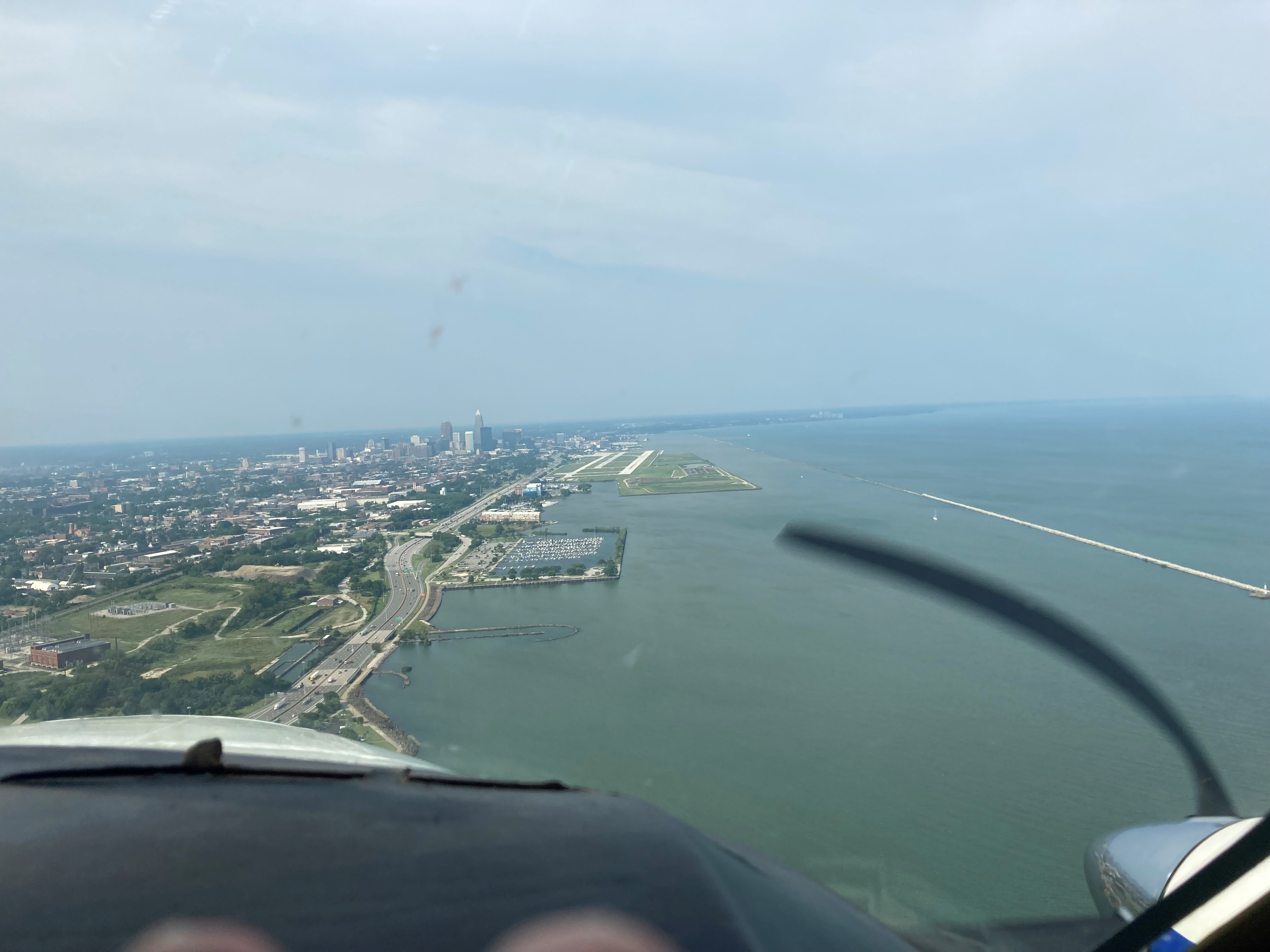
Cleveland Burke Waterfront Airport from the cockpit of a Kingair E90

Signature Flight Support serves as the airport's fixed-base operator.

For the 12-month period ending December 31, 2019, the airport had 41,245 aircraft operations, an average of 113 per day: 74% general aviation, 23% air taxi, 2% commercial, and 1% military.

There are three flight schools located on the grounds of Burke Lakefront. These schools are, T & G Flying Club, Inc.; Zone Aviation; and Precision Helicopters.

Zone Aviation offers FAA approved full motion flight simulation with Redbird Flight Simulations FMX AATD simulator.

The International Women's Air & Space Museum is located throughout the terminal at BKL.

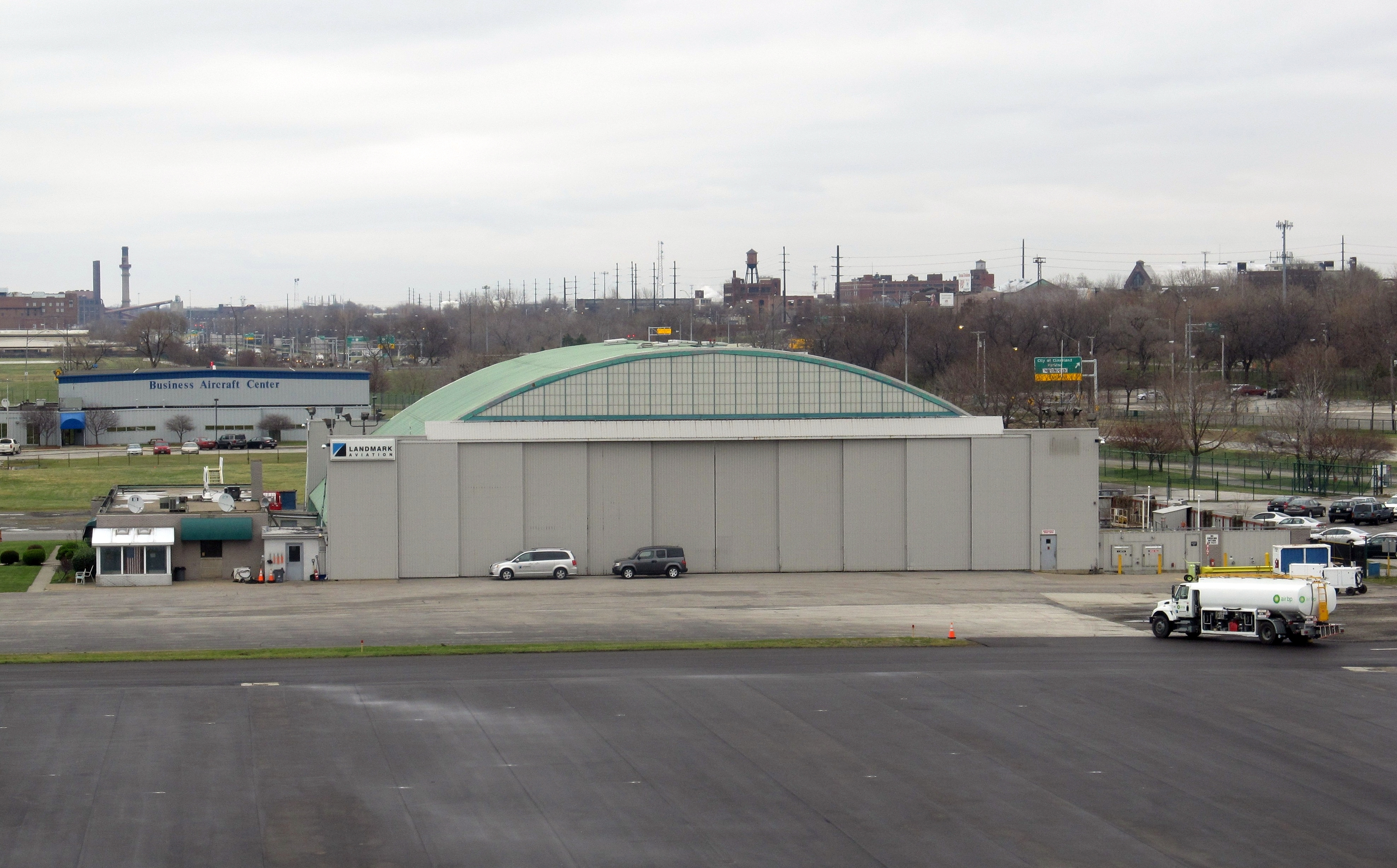
Facilities at KBKL

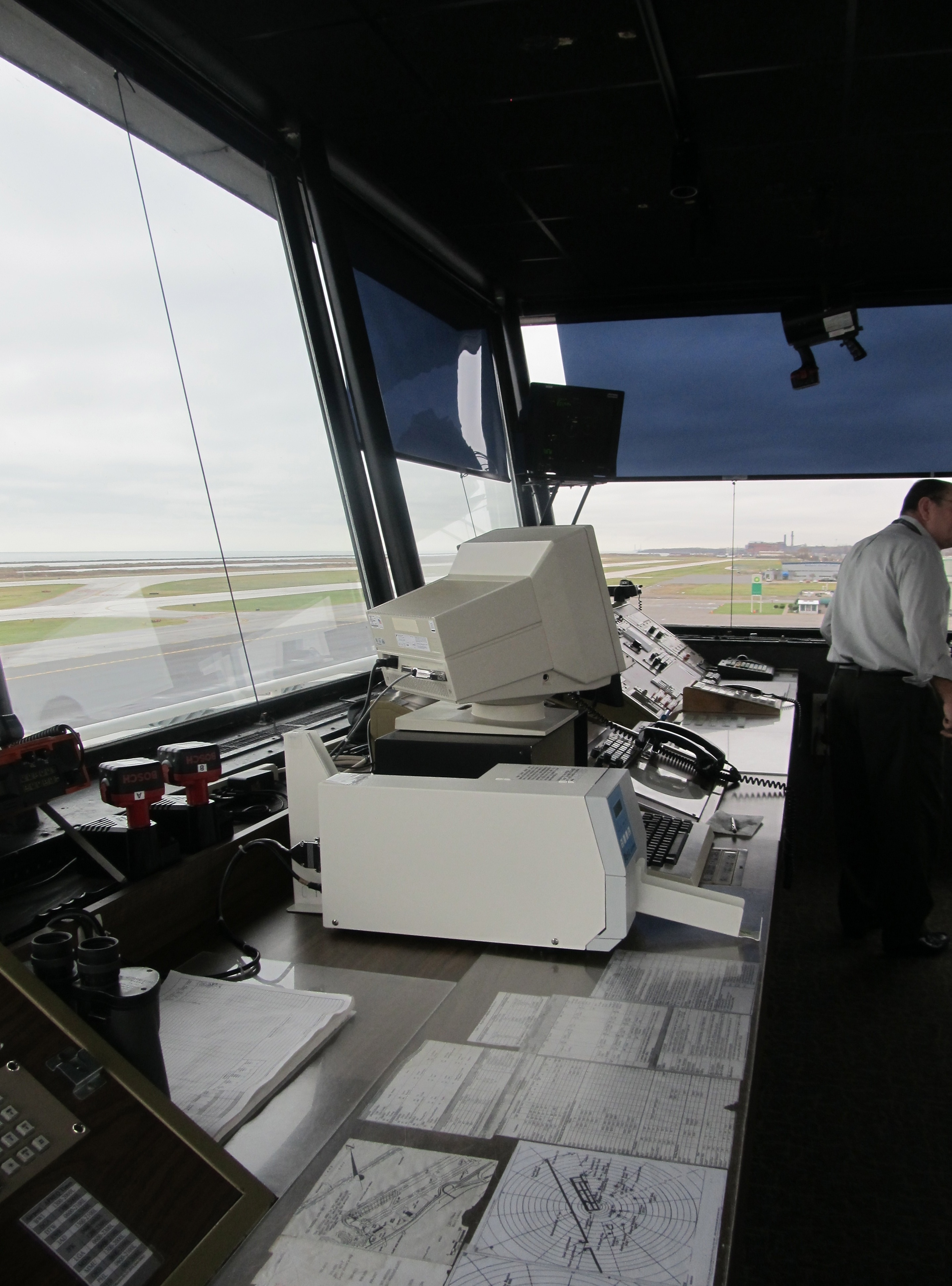
Inside the Control Tower at KBKL

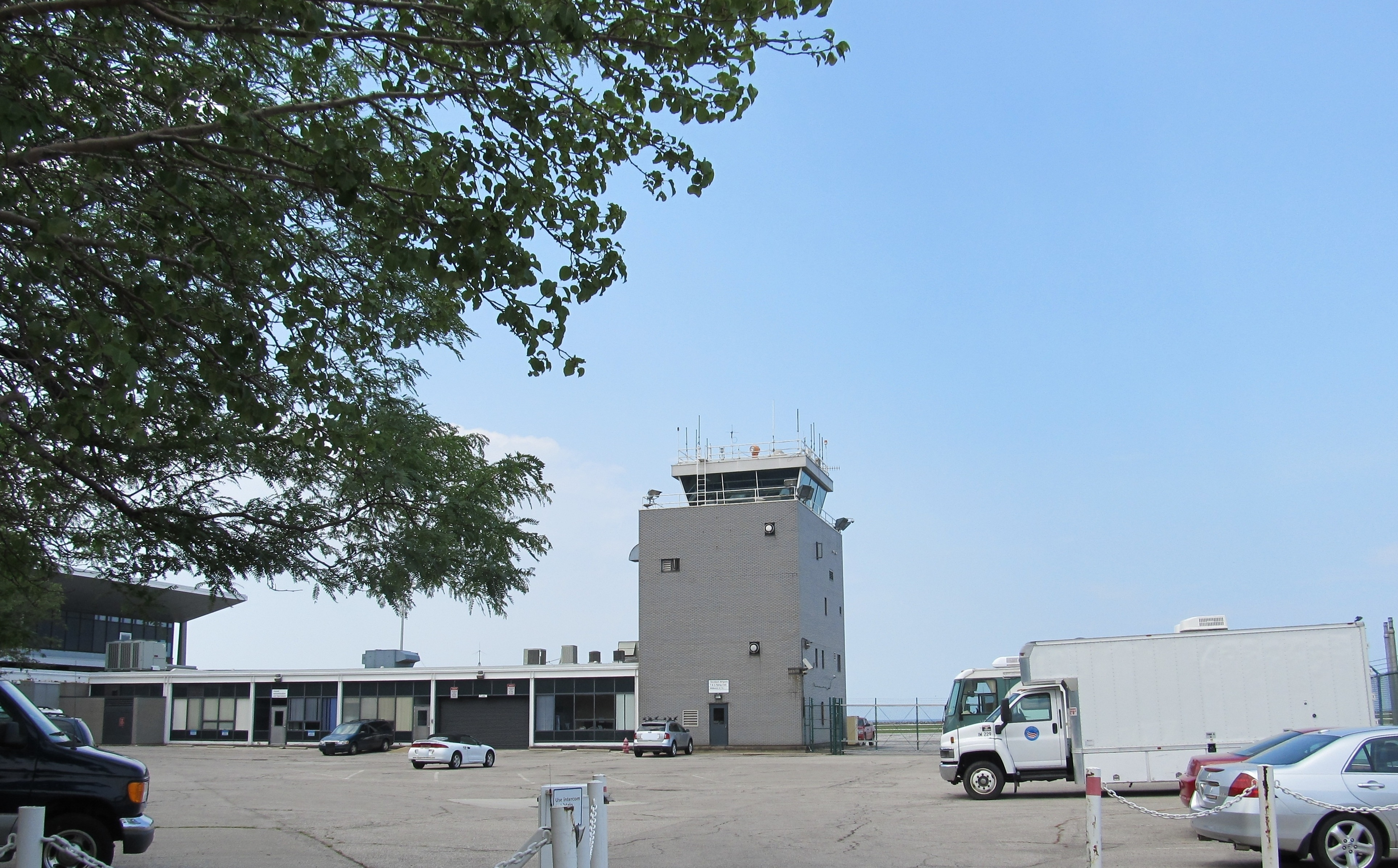
Control Tower and Employee Parking at KBKL

=== Aircraft ===
For the 12-month period ending December 31, 2019, 17 aircraft are based at the airport: 9 single-engine airplanes, 5 helicopters, and 3 jet airplanes.

General Aviation aircraft rentals can be made to qualifying pilots at T&G Flying Club or Zone Aviation. Flights can be chartered through a number of companies operating out of the airport.

=== Airspace ===
Burke-Lakefront is a class D Airspace. In addition to airport traffic, Burke Lakefront tower and approach control typically provide radar separation to medivac helicopters en route to University Hospitals of Cleveland and Cleveland Clinic which fall within the airspace that extends from the surface to 3000 feet above mean sea level.

Cleveland Hopkins class B Airspace lies above and to the southwest of the Burke Lakefront class D.

=== US Customs and Immigration ===
Burke-Lakefront serves as an international airport and is available for entry by international travelers. US Customs and immigration clearance are available with two hour prior notice.

=== Non-aviation facilities ===
Since the city owned Burke-Lakefront was designed for significantly higher usage and future need, some city government agencies and private businesses unrelated to aviation currently occupy unused terminal space. The Cleveland Division of Police hit-skip unit, employee assistance unit, and aviation unit are currently located in Terminal 3. Weather Incorporated and the studio for KAZ Radio Television Network are located in the main terminal.

A decommissioned freighter Kearsarge (Now called Barge Number 225) has been converted to office space and is permanently owned by and docked at the airport. Lean Dog Software and Arras Keathly Advertising are currently tenants. Outdoor event space is available for rent.

== Controversy ==
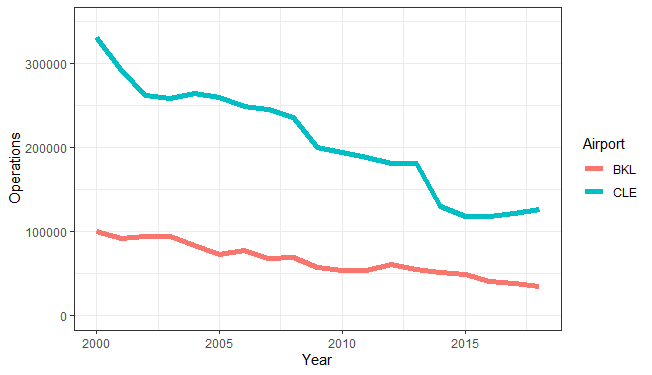
Total annual operations at Burke Lakefront Airport (BKL) and Cleveland Hopkins International Airport (CLE) from 2000 to 2018. Data from FAA Air Traffic Activity Systems (ATADS).

Dwindling operations and increasing interest in waterfront redevelopment have led to calls for the city to consider closing Burke Lakefront Airport.

In 2023, Cleveland mayor Justin Bibb made good on a promise to explore other ways to use the land. An outside firm was hired to exercise a study on the airport. The study was released on March 25, 2026.

== Incidents ==
- September 8, 1981, the commander of the Thunderbirds, Lt. Col. David Smith, was taking off from Burke Lakefront Airport in his T-38 Talon when it ingested several seagulls, stalling the engines. Smith and his crew chief ejected from the jet, but Smith was killed when his chute failed to open.
- September 27, 1986, a runway was closed after debris from a mass balloon release by the charity United Way Services of Cleveland fell on the airport.
- In early 2008, a small twin-engined aircraft crashed into Lake Erie shortly after takeoff. The 68-year-old pilot was rumored to have had a heart attack as he made a turn to Niagara Falls.
- In September 2009, a TS-11 Iskra scheduled to appear at the air show made a gear up landing. The pilot was unharmed and the aircraft received only light damage to the cowling and left wing.
- On December 29, 2016, a Cessna 525C CJ4, registered N614SB, disappeared shortly after takeoff from Burke Lakefront Airport and is believed to have crashed into Lake Erie. A Coast Guard search ensued after air traffic control tower lost contact with the aircraft around 23:00 EST (04:00 UTC) that evening. The jet had six occupants on board at the time of the incident. Days after its disappearance, investigators reported debris washing ashore, and luggage found in the lake was confirmed to have been from the missing plane. Large pieces of the aircraft were finally recovered around January 10, 2017.
- On February 5, 2018, a Beechcraft Beechjet BE-40, registered N570TM, slid off the end of the runway into the engineered materials arrestor system, due to icy conditions. Four passengers were on board, but there were no injuries reported.

== See also ==
- List of airports in Ohio
