= Climate of Columbus, Ohio =

Columbus

Climate chart (precipitation, max. and min. temperature)
| J | F | M | A | M | J | J | A | S | O | N | D |
| 2.7 37 23 | 2.3 41 25 | 3 51 33 | 3.4 63 43 | 4.2 73 52 | 4 82 62 | 4.8 85 65 | 3.3 84 64 | 2.8 77 56 | 2.6 65 45 | 3.2 53 36 | 3 40 27 |
- █ Average max. and min. temperatures in °F
- █ Precipitation totals in inches
- Source: NOAA
Metric conversion
| J | F | M | A | M | J | J | A | S | O | N | D |
| 69 3 −5 | 57 5 −4 | 77 11 0 | 86 17 6 | 106 23 11 | 102 28 16 | 122 29 19 | 84 29 18 | 72 25 14 | 66 18 7 | 81 11 2 | 75 5 −3 |
- █ Average max. and min. temperatures in °C
- █ Precipitation totals in mm

Columbus, Ohio has a humid continental (Köppen climate classification Dfa) climate, characterized by humid, hot summers and cold winters, with no dry season. The Dfa climate has average temperatures above 22 °C (72 °F) during the warmest months, with at least four months averaging above 10 °C (50 °F), and below 0 °C (32 °F) during the coldest. The climate is transitional with the Cfa humid subtropical climate to the south, characterized by humid, hot summers and cool winters (an average temperature above 0 °C (32 °F) but below 18 °C (64.4 °F) during the coldest months).

Columbus is within USDA hardiness zone 6a. Winter snowfall is relatively light, since the city is not in the typical path of strong winter lows, such as the Nor'easters that strike cities farther east. It is also too far south and west for lake-effect snow from Lake Erie to have much effect, although the lakes to the North contribute to long stretches of cloudy spells in winter.

Columbus is subject to severe weather typical to the Midwestern United States. Severe thunderstorms can bring lightning, large hail and on rare occasion tornadoes, especially during the spring and sometimes through fall.

Climate data for Columbus, Ohio (John Glenn Int'l), 1991–2020 normals, (Note: Mean monthly maxima and minima (i.e. the expected highest and lowest temperature readings at any point during the year or given month) calculated based on data at said location from 1991 to 2020.) extremes 1878–present (Note: Official records for Columbus were kept downtown from July 1878 to December 1947, and at John Glenn Int'l since January 1948. For more information, see Threadex)
| Month | Jan | Feb | Mar | Apr | May | Jun | Jul | Aug | Sep | Oct | Nov | Dec | Year |
|---|---|---|---|---|---|---|---|---|---|---|---|---|---|
| Record high °F (°C) | 74 (23) | 78 (26) | 86 (30) | 90 (32) | 96 (36) | 102 (39) | 106 (41) | 103 (39) | 100 (38) | 94 (34) | 80 (27) | 76 (24) | 106 (41) |
| Mean maximum °F (°C) | 65.0 (18.3) | 64.1 (17.8) | 73.6 (23.1) | 81.6 (27.6) | 88.3 (31.3) | 93.1 (33.9) | 93.7 (34.3) | 92.8 (33.8) | 90.2 (32.3) | 83.2 (28.4) | 70.5 (21.4) | 62.5 (16.9) | 95.0 (35.0) |
| Mean daily maximum °F (°C) | 37.1 (2.8) | 40.8 (4.9) | 51.1 (10.6) | 64.1 (17.8) | 74.1 (23.4) | 82.2 (27.9) | 85.4 (29.7) | 84.1 (28.9) | 77.8 (25.4) | 65.5 (18.6) | 52.3 (11.3) | 41.5 (5.3) | 63.0 (17.2) |
| Daily mean °F (°C) | 29.6 (−1.3) | 32.5 (0.3) | 41.6 (5.3) | 53.2 (11.8) | 63.3 (17.4) | 71.9 (22.2) | 75.4 (24.1) | 74.0 (23.3) | 67.2 (19.6) | 55.2 (12.9) | 43.6 (6.4) | 34.5 (1.4) | 53.5 (11.9) |
| Mean daily minimum °F (°C) | 22.0 (−5.6) | 24.2 (−4.3) | 32.0 (0.0) | 42.2 (5.7) | 52.4 (11.3) | 61.6 (16.4) | 65.4 (18.6) | 63.9 (17.7) | 56.5 (13.6) | 44.8 (7.1) | 35.0 (1.7) | 27.4 (−2.6) | 43.9 (6.6) |
| Mean minimum °F (°C) | 1.7 (−16.8) | 6.3 (−14.3) | 14.5 (−9.7) | 27.1 (−2.7) | 37.8 (3.2) | 48.6 (9.2) | 55.7 (13.2) | 54.3 (12.4) | 43.2 (6.2) | 31.1 (−0.5) | 20.6 (−6.3) | 11.0 (−11.7) | −0.9 (−18.3) |
| Record low °F (°C) | −22 (−30) | −20 (−29) | −6 (−21) | 14 (−10) | 25 (−4) | 35 (2) | 43 (6) | 39 (4) | 31 (−1) | 17 (−8) | −5 (−21) | −17 (−27) | −22 (−30) |
| Average precipitation inches (mm) | 3.00 (76) | 2.41 (61) | 3.62 (92) | 3.85 (98) | 3.99 (101) | 4.33 (110) | 4.67 (119) | 3.74 (95) | 3.14 (80) | 2.90 (74) | 2.79 (71) | 3.13 (80) | 41.57 (1,056) |
| Average snowfall inches (cm) | 9.5 (24) | 7.6 (19) | 4.1 (10) | 0.5 (1.3) | 0.0 (0.0) | 0.0 (0.0) | 0.0 (0.0) | 0.0 (0.0) | 0.0 (0.0) | 0.2 (0.51) | 1.2 (3.0) | 5.1 (13) | 28.2 (72) |
| Average extreme snow depth inches (cm) | 4.4 (11) | 3.7 (9.4) | 2.4 (6.1) | 0.1 (0.25) | 0.0 (0.0) | 0.0 (0.0) | 0.0 (0.0) | 0.0 (0.0) | 0.0 (0.0) | 0.0 (0.0) | 0.4 (1.0) | 2.3 (5.8) | 6.6 (17) |
| Average precipitation days (≥ 0.01 in) | 14.7 | 11.8 | 12.5 | 13.7 | 14.0 | 11.7 | 10.9 | 9.5 | 8.7 | 10.0 | 10.5 | 12.7 | 140.7 |
| Average snowy days (≥ 0.1 in) | 9.0 | 6.7 | 4.0 | 1.0 | 0.0 | 0.0 | 0.0 | 0.0 | 0.0 | 0.1 | 1.9 | 5.6 | 28.3 |
| Average relative humidity (%) | 71.4 | 69.5 | 64.5 | 62.5 | 66.5 | 68.5 | 70.6 | 72.8 | 72.8 | 69.3 | 71.8 | 74.1 | 69.5 |
| Average dew point °F (°C) | 18.1 (−7.7) | 20.5 (−6.4) | 28.6 (−1.9) | 37.4 (3.0) | 48.9 (9.4) | 58.3 (14.6) | 62.8 (17.1) | 61.7 (16.5) | 55.2 (12.9) | 42.6 (5.9) | 33.6 (0.9) | 24.3 (−4.3) | 41.0 (5.0) |
| Mean monthly sunshine hours | 110.6 | 126.3 | 162.0 | 201.8 | 243.4 | 258.1 | 260.9 | 235.9 | 212.0 | 183.1 | 104.2 | 84.3 | 2,182.6 |
| Percentage possible sunshine | 37 | 42 | 44 | 51 | 55 | 57 | 57 | 56 | 57 | 53 | 35 | 29 | 49 |
| Average ultraviolet index | 2 | 3 | 4 | 6 | 8 | 9 | 9 | 8 | 6 | 4 | 2 | 1 | 5 |
Source: NOAA (sun, relative humidity, and dew point 1961–1990) and Weather Atlas
