= Bolton Field =

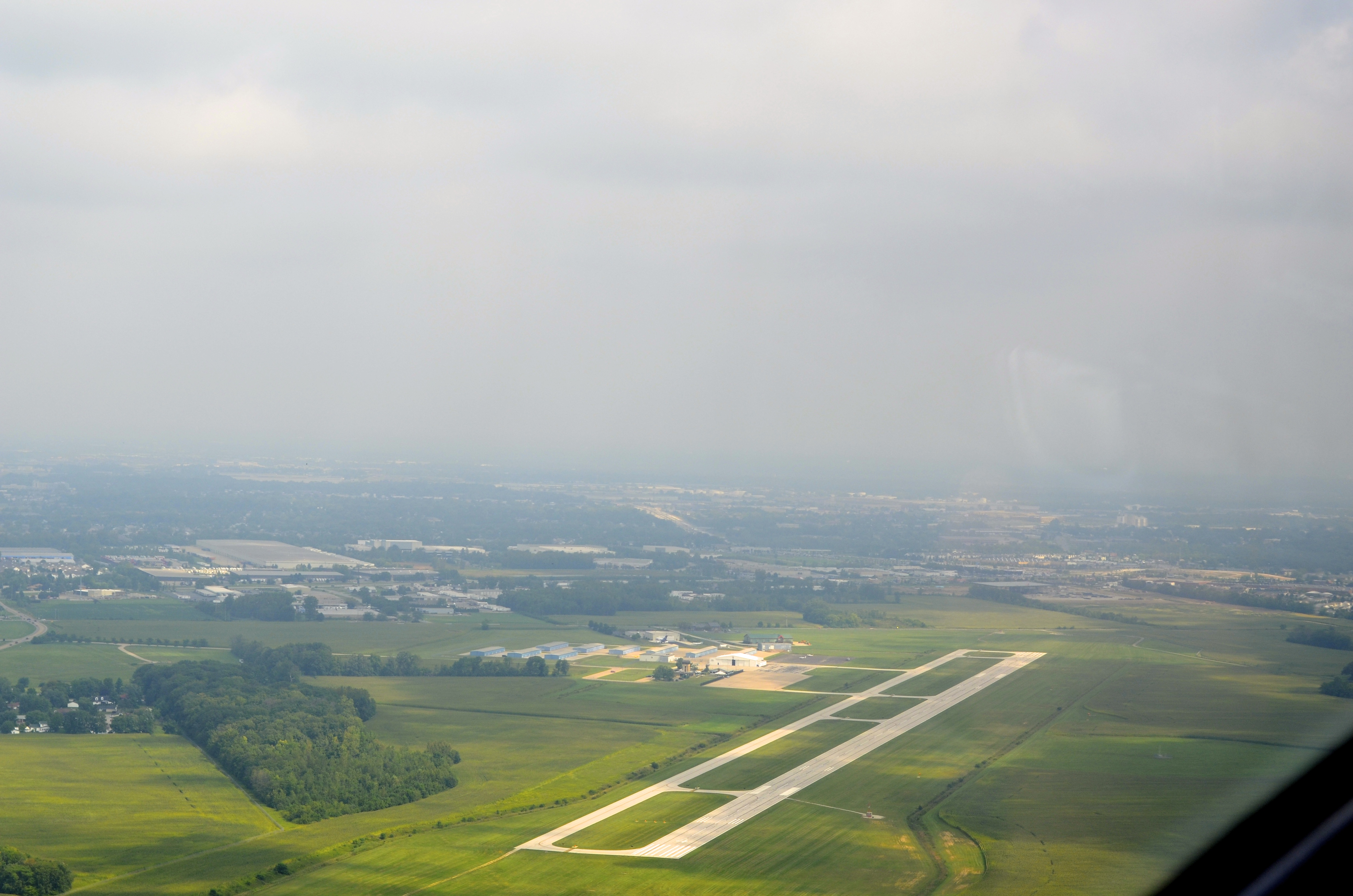
- IATA: none; ICAO: KTZR; FAA LID: TZR

Summary
- Airport type: Public
- Operator: Columbus Regional Airport Authority
- Serves: Columbus, Ohio
- Opened: 1970
- Time zone: UTC−05:00 (-5)
  - Summer (DST): UTC−04:00 (-4)
- Elevation AMSL: 905 ft (276 m)
- Coordinates: 39°54′04″N 083°08′13″W
- Public transit access: 9
- Website: columbusairports.com/bolton/

Map
- Location of airport in Ohio TZR (the United States)

Runways
Direction	Length		Surface
Direction	ft	m	Surface
4/22	5,500	1,676	Asphalt

Statistics (2022)
- Aircraft operations (year ending 6/7/2022): 26,932
- Based aircraft: 64
- Source: Federal Aviation Administration

Bolton Field (ICAO: KTZR, FAA LID: TZR) is a public airport in Columbus, Franklin County, Ohio, United States. It is a towered airport operated under the Columbus Regional Airport Authority. It is one of 12 general aviation reliever airports in Ohio recognized in the National Plan of Integrated Airport Systems (NPIAS) and is a reliever airport for John Glenn Columbus International Airport.

Most U.S. airports use the same three-letter location identifier for the FAA and IATA, but Bolton Field is TZR to the FAA and has no IATA code.

== History ==
While many new airports were built in Ohio under a state program in the late 1960s, Bolton field was the only one constructed with federal funds. It opened on October 24, 1970, a day after the Franklin County Common Pleas Court rejected a move by a nearby private airport (located on Darby Dan Farm) to stop it. Major Harry Charles Davidson, a WWII veteran residing in Groveport, Ohio, was the first airport manager at Bolton Field, appointed by the Mayor of Columbus, Jack Sensenbrenner. The airport is named after long-time Port Columbus International Airport Superintendent Francis A. "Jack" Bolton, honored posthumously when the city dedicated the airfield to him at its opening. The airport was built to handle personal and business aviation, freeing Port Columbus for commercial traffic.

In 1980, the operation of John Glenn International Airport (formerly Port Columbus International Airport) and Bolton Field Airport was transferred from the City of Columbus to the Columbus Airport Authority; in 2003, the Columbus Airport Authority and the Rickenbacker Port Authority merged to create the Columbus Regional Airport Authority, which manages John Glenn Columbus International (CMH), Rickenbacker International Airport (LCK) and Bolton Field (TZR) airports.

The airport is home to regular events hosted by the Experimental Aircraft Association's Young Eagles Program.

== Facilities and aircraft ==
Bolton Field covers 1,500 acres (607 ha) and has one asphalt runway (4/22), which measures 5,500 ft × 100 ft (1,676 m × 30 m). Fuel is available; planes can use tiedowns or hangars for parking.

Capital City Jet provides flight instruction, fixed-base operations, and air charter services. FBO amenities include a conference room, a crew lounge, snooze rooms, a courtesy car, and more.

Columbus State Community College has an Aviation Maintenance Training Program on the field.

Scioto Valley 99s and Central Ohio Balloon Club are aviation organizations located on the grounds. There is also a barbecue restaurant on the field, which offers dinner and airplane rides each year on Valentine's Day.

For the 12-month period ending June 7, 2022, the airport had 26,932 aircraft operations, average 74 per day. It was nearly 100% general aviation as well as <1% air taxi and <1% military. During the same time period, 64 aircraft were based at this airport: 57 single-engine and 6 multi-engine airplanes as well as 1 helicopter. This was down from 74,511 aircraft operations and 82 based aircraft in 2011.

== Incidents and accidents ==
- On October 8, 1992, an aircraft veered left and departed the runway while landing at Bolton Field. The probable cause of the accident was found to be the pilot's failure to maintain control of the airplane.
- On June 18, 1993, upon approach for landing on grass runway 22, a Glasflügel H-101 glider registered N101AZ, encountered a powered airplane, which had entered the landing pattern. The pilot extended his base leg to the approach to accommodate the aircraft. He then decided that it would be difficult to complete the landing on the planned runway, so he switched to a site he was unfamiliar with. During this landing, the glider impacted a ditch. The ultra-light aircraft suffered damage to its tail section.
- On March 23, 2003, a Piper PA-22 was substantially damaged during takeoff from Bolton Field. A certified flight instructor onboard was providing instruction to the private pilot flying, who himself had not flown since 1983. On the accident takeoff, the aircraft was almost at takeoff speed when it began to veer to the right. The CFI took control of the airplane and attempted to correct; however, the airplane departed the right side of the runway, and ground-looped. The left main landing gear collapsed and the left wing struck the ground. The probable cause of the accident was found to be the pilot under instruction's failure to maintain directional control, and the flight instructor's delayed remedial action.
- On February 14, 2017, a Beech D55 Baron impacted runway 22 at the Bolton Field Airport following a loss of left engine power during takeoff. Just after takeoff, the left engine began to lose power and its rpm began dropping. The left seat pilot transferred control to the right seat passenger, who tried to land the aircraft on the remaining runway. The aircraft landed hard, but the right seat pilot managed to stop the aircraft on the runway surface. The left main gear was found to have collapsed. The probable cause of the accident was found to be the partial loss of left engine power during takeoff and initial climb, which led to a hard landing in gusting crosswind conditions; the reason for the loss of engine power could not be determined because postaccident examination of the left engine revealed no anomalies that would have precluded normal operation.

== See also ==
- List of airports in Ohio
