= Columbus Regional Airport Authority =

Airport authority in Columbus, Ohio, United States

Agency overview
- Formed: 2003
- Jurisdiction: Government of Columbus, Ohio
- Agency executive: Daren Griffin, president and CEO

Columbus Regional Airport Authority (CRAA) oversees the operations of John Glenn Columbus International Airport, Rickenbacker International Airport, and Bolton Field airports in the Columbus metropolitan area.

The Columbus Regional Airport Authority was created in 2003 when the Columbus Airport Authority merged with the Rickenbacker Port Authority.
