= AirNet Express =

Airline of the United States

AirNet
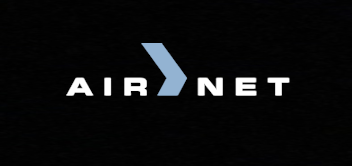
IATA	ICAO	Call sign
-	USC	STAR CHECK
- Founded: 1974; 52 years ago
- Hubs: Rickenbacker International Airport
- Fleet size: 89
- Parent company: Kalitta Charters
- Headquarters: Rickenbacker International Airport; Franklin County, Ohio
- Key people: Doug Kalitta, President and CEO
- Website: http://www.airnet.com

AirNet is an American Part 135 cargo airline based in Franklin County, Ohio, United States, near Columbus. It specializes in delivery of documents and small packages. Banks were once their main client, transporting checks for over 300 of the country's largest banks. With the passing of the Check 21 Act, and the increase in the usage of electronic banking, this has been greatly reduced. AirNet is now focusing on time critical documents and packages, such as those required in the scientific and medical field. The main sort facility is located at Rickenbacker International Airport in Columbus. In September 2008, AirNet announced that they were moving their sort facility to Chicago, reducing the number of aircraft, and redesigning their route network. Their corporate headquarters remains in Columbus.

== History ==
Financial Air Express / PDQ was founded in 1974 by Gerald Mercer in Pontiac, MI. Jet Courier was founded at about the same time by Donald Wright in Cincinnati, OH. Jet Courier changed its name to Wright International Express in January 1985. In July 1988, these two companies merged to become US Check Airlines, headed by Gerald Mercer. US Check acquired Air Continental of Norwalk, OH a year later to become a dominant player in the cancelled check transportation industry. US Check later acquired Midway Aviation of Dallas, TX, Pacific Air Charter of San Diego, CA, Express Convenience Center of Southfield, Massachusetts and Data Air Courier of Chicago, Illinois.

In order to raise additional capital and further grow the company, US Check went public in 1998 to become AirNet Systems. In 2008, AirNet Systems was purchased by Bayside Capital, which had once owned the now defunct Flight Express of Orlando, FL. In August 2015 Kalitta Charters acquired AirNet.

== Destinations ==
AirNet's destinations (As of January 2019):

AirNet Express destinations
City, State	Airport	Airport code (IATA/ICAO)	Hub
Albuquerque, New Mexico	Albuquerque International Sunport	ABQ/KABQ	
Atlanta, Georgia	DeKalb-Peachtree Airport	PDK/KPDK	
Atlanta, Georgia	Fulton County Airport	FTY/KFTY	
Baltimore, Maryland	Martin State Airport	MTN/KMTN	
Bedford, Massachusetts	Hanscom Field	BED/KBED	
Billings, Montana	Billings Logan International Airport	BIL/KBIL	
Birmingham, Alabama	Birmingham-Shuttlesworth International Airport	BHM/KBHM	
Boston, Massachusetts	Logan International Airport	BOS/KBOS	
Boston, Massachusetts	Lawrence Municipal Airport	LWM/KLWM	
Buffalo, New York	Buffalo Niagara International Airport	BUF/KBUF	
Burbank, California	Hollywood Burbank Airport	BUR/KBUR	
Charlotte, North Carolina	Charlotte/Douglas International Airport	CLT/KCLT	
West Chicago, Illinois	DuPage Airport	DPA/KDPA	
Cincinnati, Ohio	Cincinnati Municipal Lunken Airport	LUK/KLUK	
Cleveland, Ohio	Cleveland Burke Lakefront Airport	BKL/KBKL	
Columbus, Ohio	Rickenbacker International Airport	LCK/KLCK	Hub
Addison, Texas	Addison Airport	ADS/KADS	
Denver, Colorado	Centennial Airport	APA/KAPA	
Des Moines, Iowa	Des Moines International Airport	DSM/KDSM	
Detroit-Ypsilanti, Michigan	Willow Run Airport	YIP/KYIP	
Fort Lauderdale, Florida	Fort Lauderdale Executive Airport	FXE/KFXE	
Fort Wayne, Indiana	Fort Wayne International Airport	FWA/KFWA	
Hartford-Windsor Locks, Connecticut	Bradley International Airport	BDL/KBDL	
Helena, Montana	Helena Regional Airport	HLN/KHLN	
Houston, Texas	William P. Hobby Airport	HOU/KHOU	
Jacksonville, Florida	Executive at Craig Airport	CRG/KCRG	
Jacksonville, Florida	Jacksonville International Airport	JAX/KJAX	
Kansas City, Missouri	Charles B. Wheeler Downtown Airport	MKC/KMKC	
Memphis, Tennessee	Memphis International Airport	MEM/KMEM	
Miami, Florida	Opa-Locka Airport	OPF/KOPF	
Milwaukee, Wisconsin	General Mitchell International Airport	MKE/KMKE	
New Orleans, Louisiana	Louis Armstrong New Orleans International Airport	MSY/KMSY	
Omaha, Nebraska	Eppley Airfield	OMA/KOMA	
Orlando, Florida	Orlando Executive Airport	ORL/KORL	
Pittsburgh, Pennsylvania	Greater Pittsburgh International Airport	PIT/KPIT	
Phoenix, Arizona	Phoenix Sky Harbor International Airport	PHX/KPHX	
Portland, Oregon	Hillsboro Airport	HIO/KHIO	
Raleigh-Durham, North Carolina	Raleigh–Durham International Airport	RDU/KRDU	
Richmond, Virginia	Richmond International Airport	RIC/KRIC	
Rochester, Minnesota	Rochester International Airport	RST/KRST	
Saint Louis, Missouri	St. Louis Downtown Airport	CPS/KCPS	
Saint Paul, Minnesota	St. Paul Downtown Airport	STP/KSTP	
Seattle, Washington	Boeing Field	BFI/KBFI	
South Bend, Indiana	South Bend Regional Airport	SBN/KSBN	
Tampa, Florida	Tampa International Airport	TPA/KTPA	
Teterboro, New Jersey	Teterboro Airport	TEB/KTEB	
Washington D.C.	Ronald Reagan Washington National Airport	DCA/KDCA	
Washington D.C.	Washington Dulles International Airport	IAD/KIAD	

== Fleet ==
The Airnet Express fleet consists of the following aircraft (As of May 2012):

AirNet Express fleet
Aircraft	Total	Notes
Bombardier Learjet 35A	12	
Beechcraft Baron BE-58	7	

== Accident ==
An AirNet Beechcraft Baron was lost in a crash on 8 January 2022 near Defiance, Missouri, killing the two occupants. The plane had been traveling to Centennial Airport in Colorado.

== Gallery ==
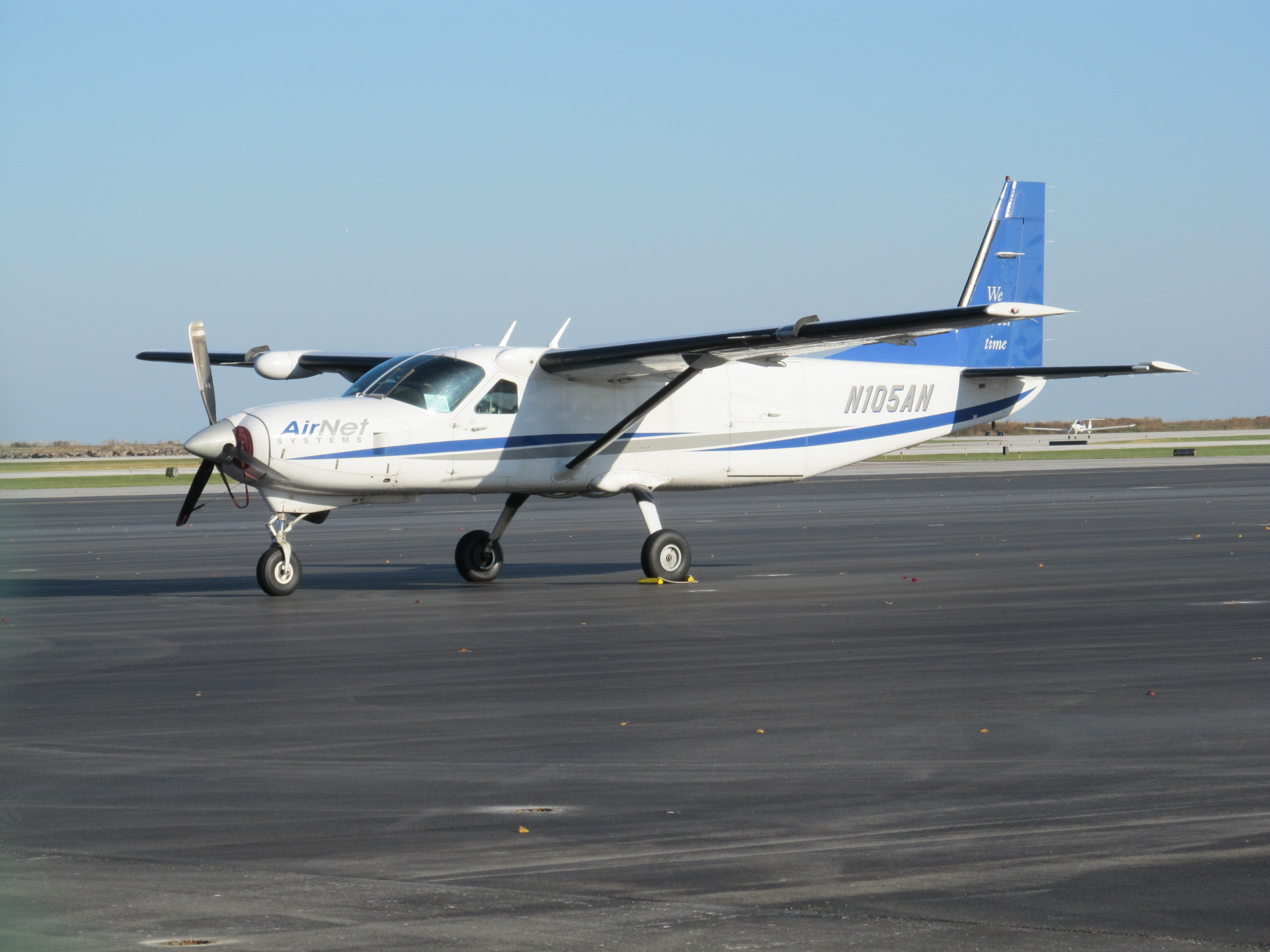
N105AN a Cessna 208 Caravan at Burke Lakefront Airport

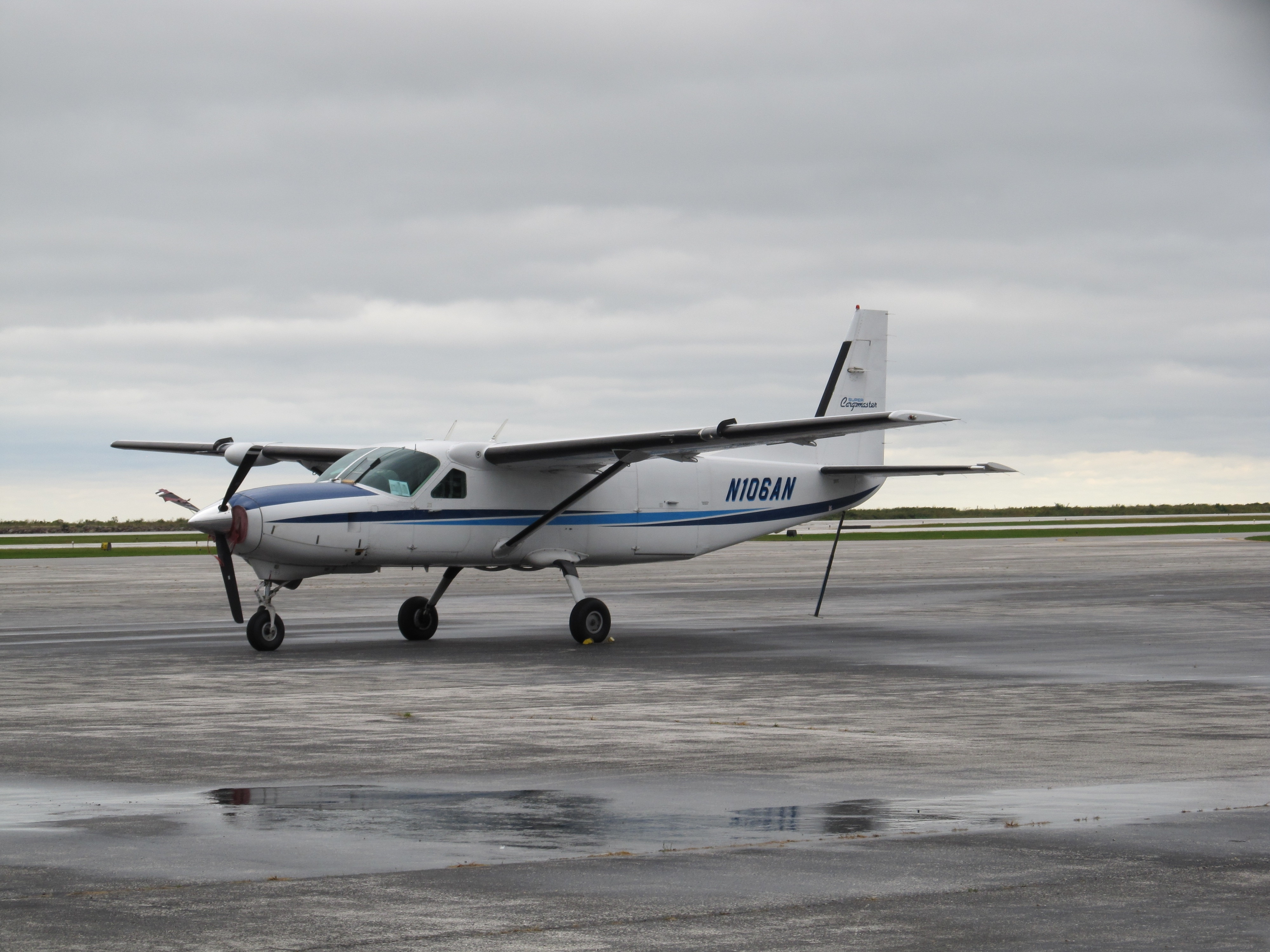
N106AN a Cessna 208 at Burke Lakefront Airport

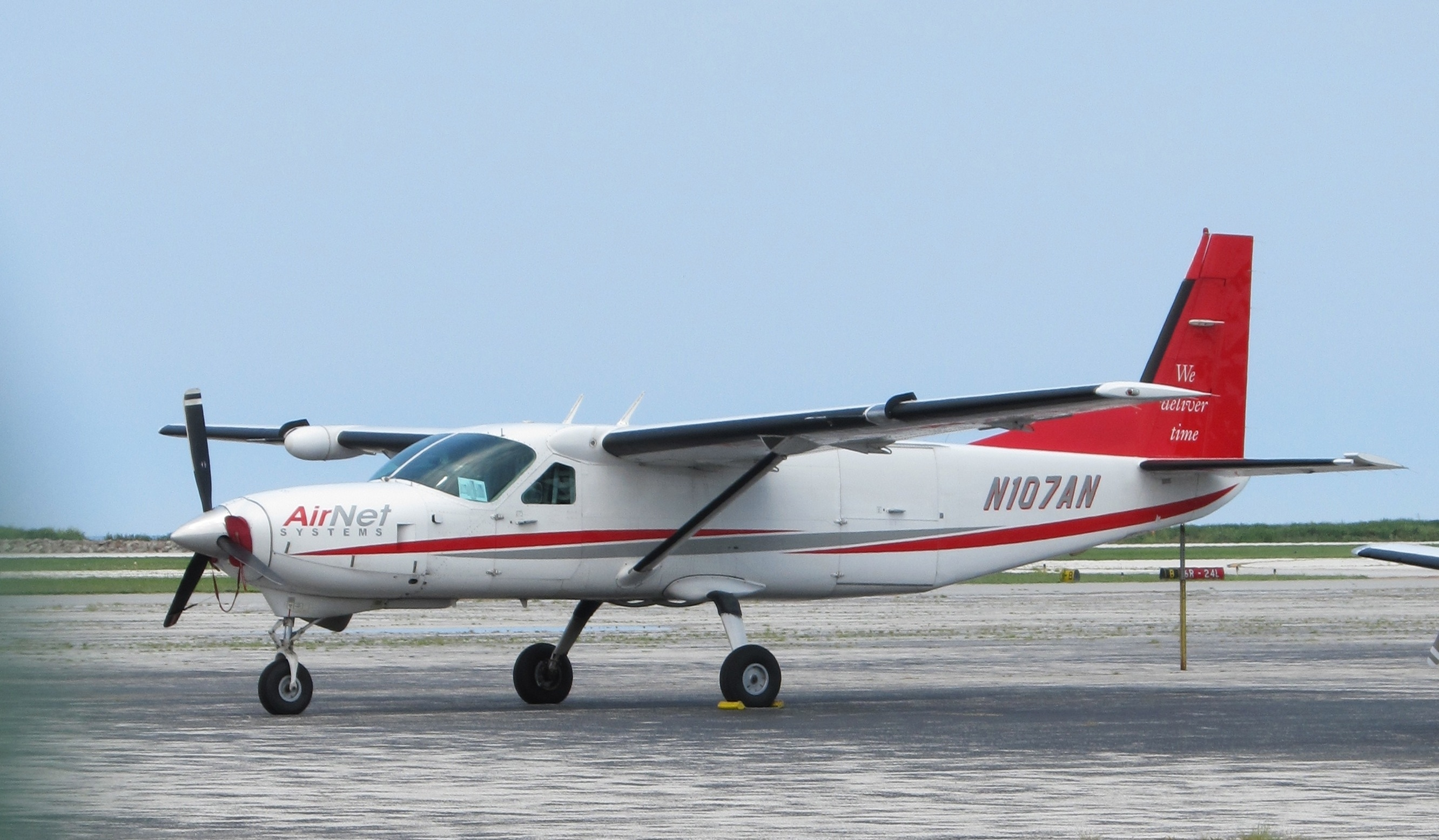
N107AN a Cessna 208 Caravan at Burke Lakefront Airport

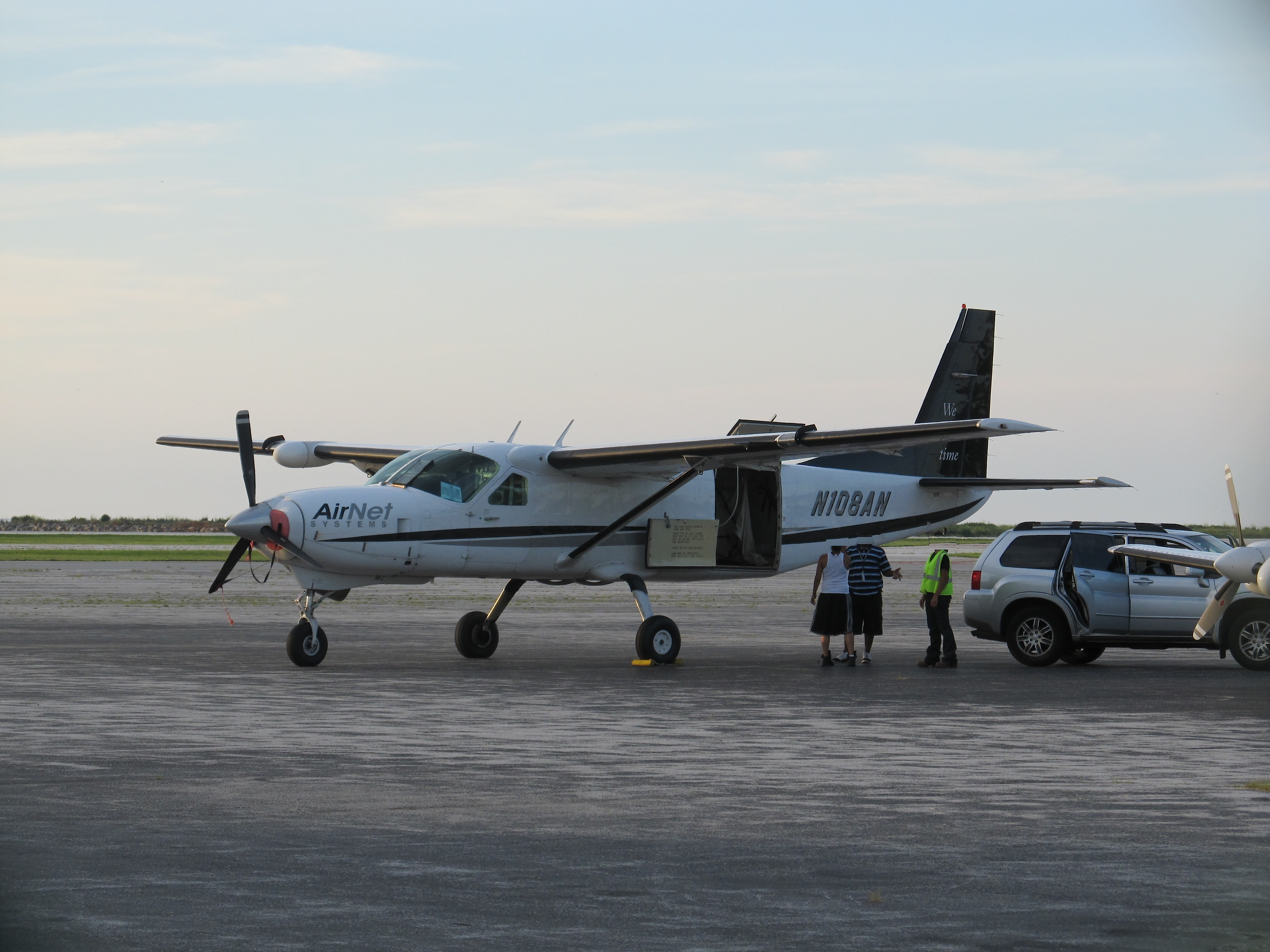
N108AN a Cessna 208 Caravan at Burke Lakefront Airport
