= John Glenn Columbus International Airport =

Airport serving Columbus, Ohio, United States

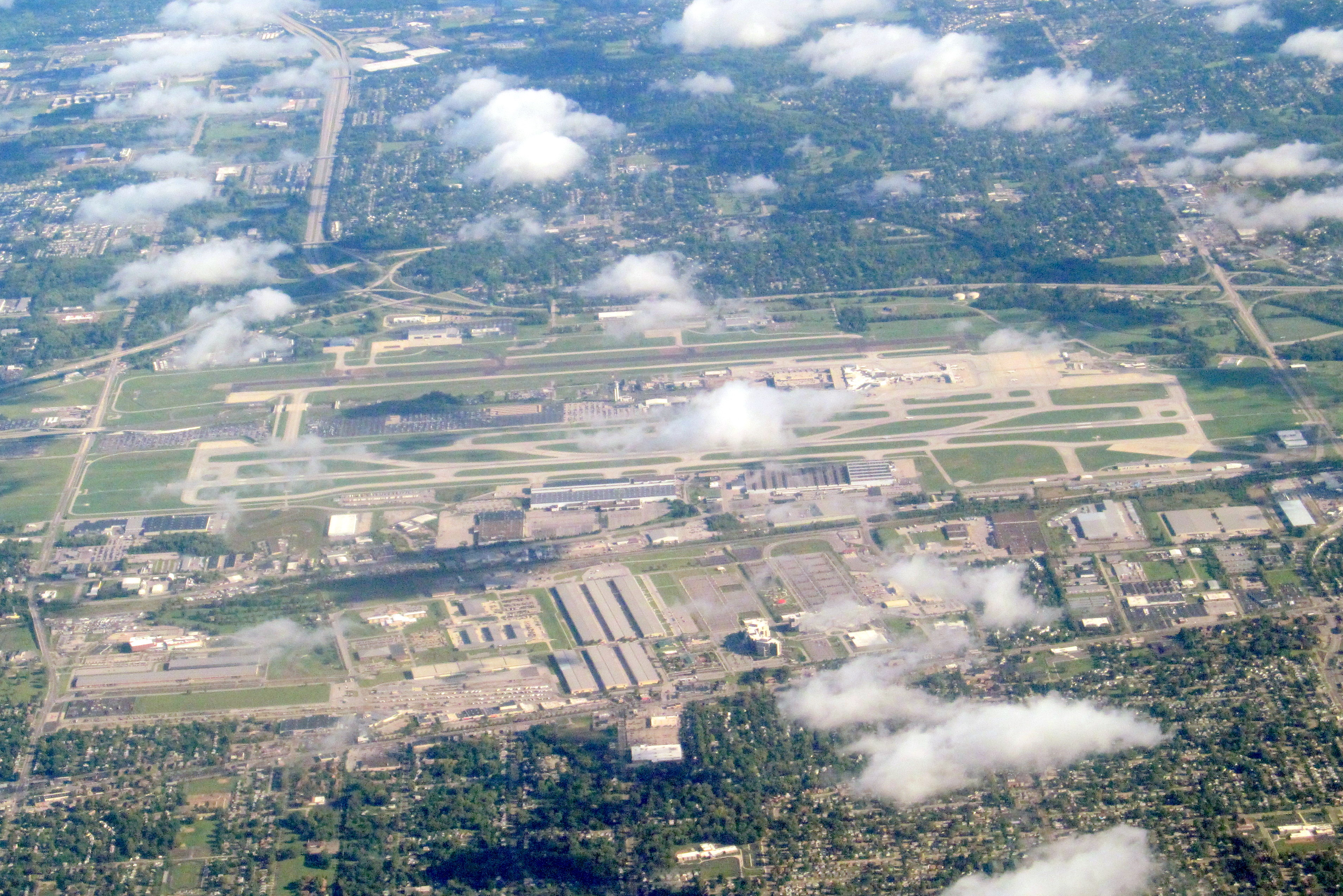
- Aerial view in 2016
- IATA: CMH; ICAO: KCMH; FAA LID: CMH

Summary
- Airport type: Public
- Owner/Operator: Columbus Regional Airport Authority
- Serves: Columbus metropolitan area
- Location: 4600 International Gateway; Columbus, Ohio, United States
- Opened: July 8, 1929; 97 years ago
- Elevation AMSL: 815 ft (248 m)
- Coordinates: 39°59′53″N 082°53′31″W
- Public transit access: 7, AirConnect
- Website: flycolumbus.com

Maps
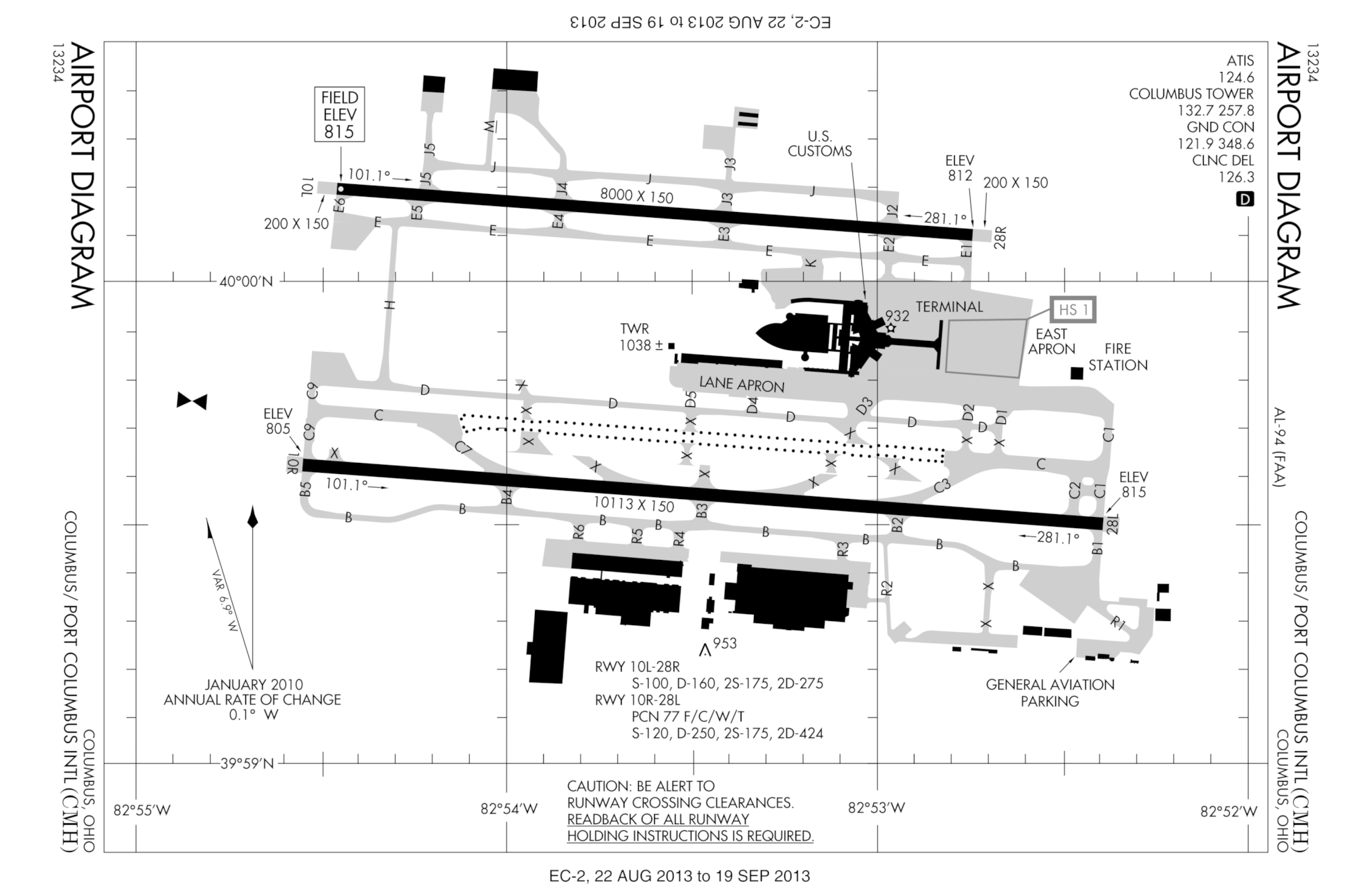
- FAA airport diagram
- Interactive map of John Glenn Columbus International Airport

Runways
| Direction | Length | | Surface |
| Direction | ft | m | Surface |
|---|---|---|---|
| 10R/28L | 10,114 | 3,083 | Asphalt |
| 10L/28R | 8,000 | 2,438 | Asphalt |

Statistics (2025)
- Total passengers: 9,014,264 ▲0.5%
- Aircraft operations: 48,881
- Area: 2,265 acres (917 ha)

John Glenn Columbus International Airport (IATA: CMH, ICAO: KCMH, FAA LID: CMH) is an international airport located 6 miles (9.7 km) east of downtown Columbus, Ohio. It is managed by the Columbus Regional Airport Authority, which also oversees operations at Rickenbacker International Airport and Bolton Field. The airport code "CMH" stands for "Columbus Municipal Hangar", the original name of the airport.

John Glenn Columbus International Airport is primarily a passenger airport. It provides 148 non-stop flights to 31 airports via many passenger airlines daily.

In 2016 the airport was re-named from Port Columbus International Airport to its current name, in honor of astronaut and four-term U.S. senator John Glenn.

== History ==
=== Early history ===
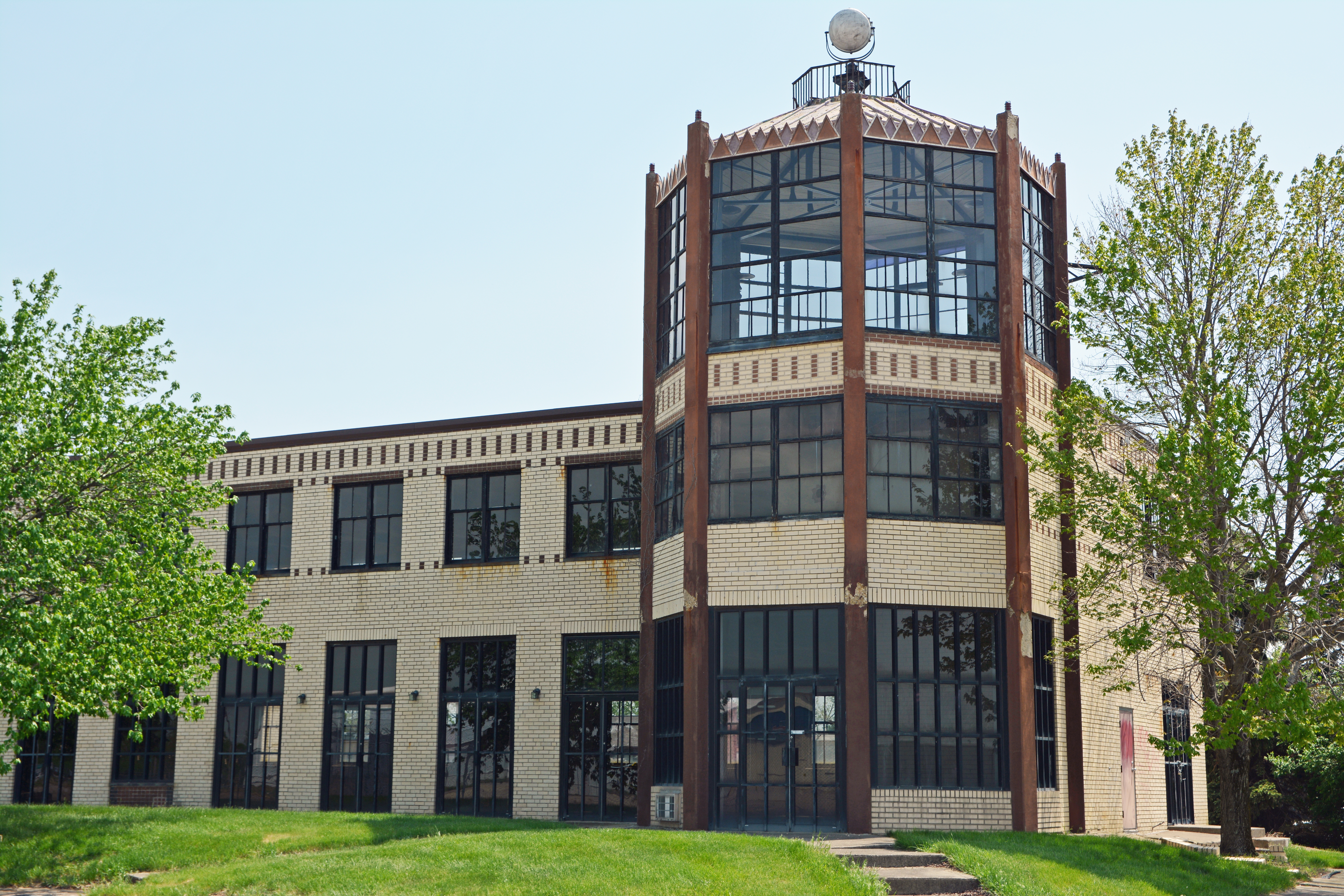
The Old Port Columbus Terminal, the airport's first control tower and terminal

The airport opened July 8, 1929, as the Columbus Municipal Hangar on a site selected by Charles Lindbergh, as the eastern air terminus of the Transcontinental Air Transport air-rail New York to Los Angeles transcontinental route. Passengers traveled overnight on the Pennsylvania Railroad's Airway Limited from New York to Columbus; by air from Columbus to Waynoka, Oklahoma; by rail again on the Atchison, Topeka & Santa Fe from Waynoka to Clovis, New Mexico; and by air from Clovis to Los Angeles. The original terminal building and hangars remain; the hangars are still in use, but the old terminal sits derelict.

During World War II, most of the facility was taken over by the U.S. Navy, which established Naval Air Station Columbus in 1942. NAS Columbus was closed and the facility relinquished back to civilian authorities in 1946. Also, during the war, the government established a government-owned aviation factory on the grounds of the airport known as Air Force Factory 85, eventually operated by North American Aviation. The plant produced the F-100 Super Sabre, RA-5 Vigilante, T-2 Buckeye, T-28 Trojan, OV-10 Bronco and T-39 Sabreliner.

The diagram on the February 1951 Coast & Geodetic Survey instrument-approach chart shows runways 006/186 3,550 ft (1,080 m) long, 052/232 4,400 ft (1,300 m), 096/276 4,500 ft (1,400 m), and 127/307 5,030 ft (1,530 m).

A new $12 million terminal building opened on September 21, 1958. Jet airline flights (American 707s) started in April 1964.

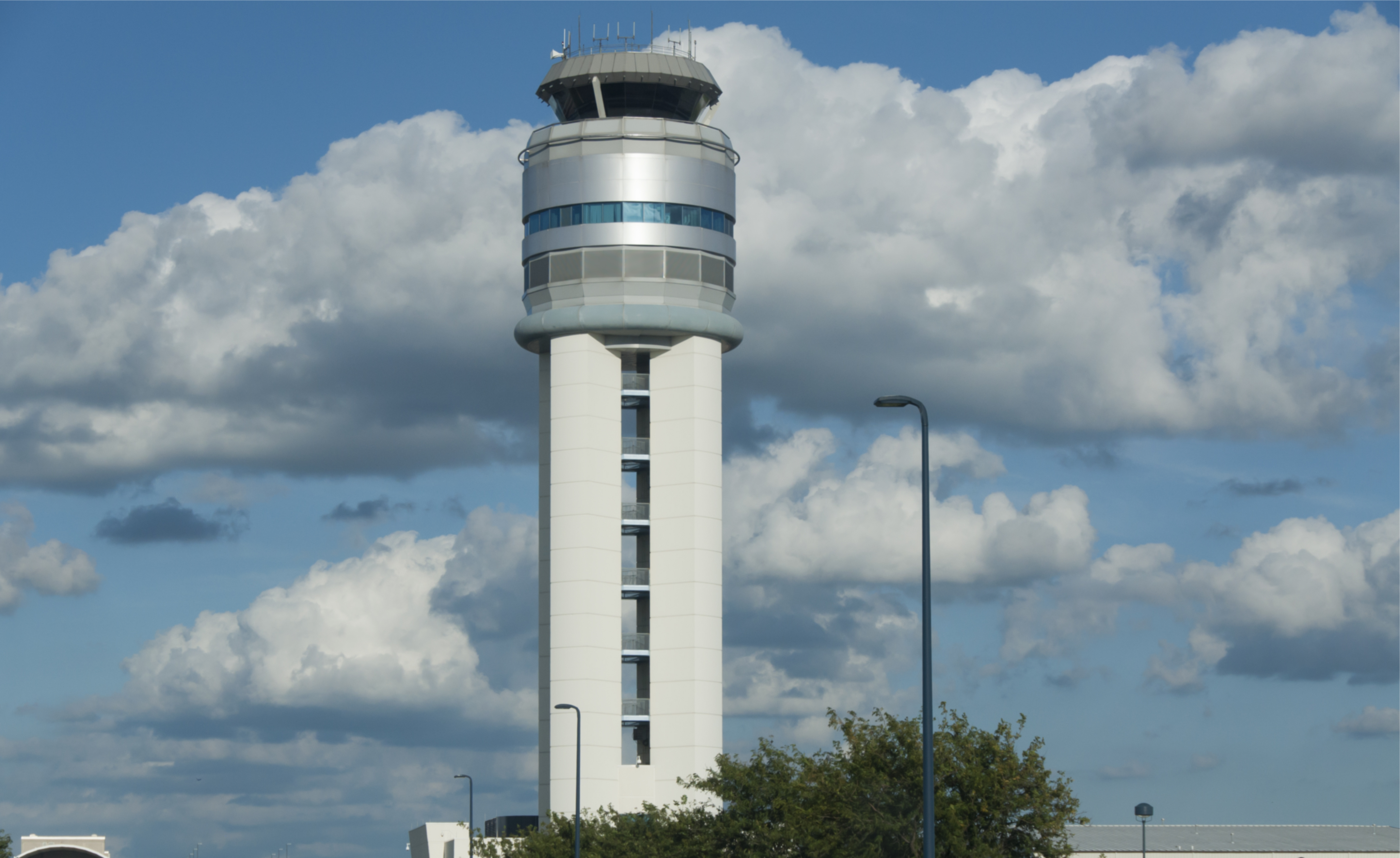
Current control tower, completed in 2004

=== Historical airline service ===
The April 1957 Official Airline Guide shows 72 airline departures each weekday: 41 TWA, 16 American, 6 Eastern, 6 Lake Central and 3 Piedmont.

The first major airline to fly into Columbus was TWA, and it kept a presence at Columbus over 70 years during the era of airline regulation. TWA offered a club for exclusive passengers up until 2000 when America West took over a gate held by TWA and the club itself due to financial problems. The site of the club is now Eddie George's 27 grille.

Columbus was formerly a hub of America West Airlines, which it opened in 1993, but the company closed the hub in 2003 due to financial losses and the post-9/11-decline in air travel.

The airport was the home base of short-lived Skybus Airlines, which began operations from Columbus on May 22, 2007. The airline touted themselves as the cheapest airline in the United States, offering a minimum of ten seats for $10 each on every flight. Skybus ceased operations April 4, 2008.

=== First around the world flight by a woman ===
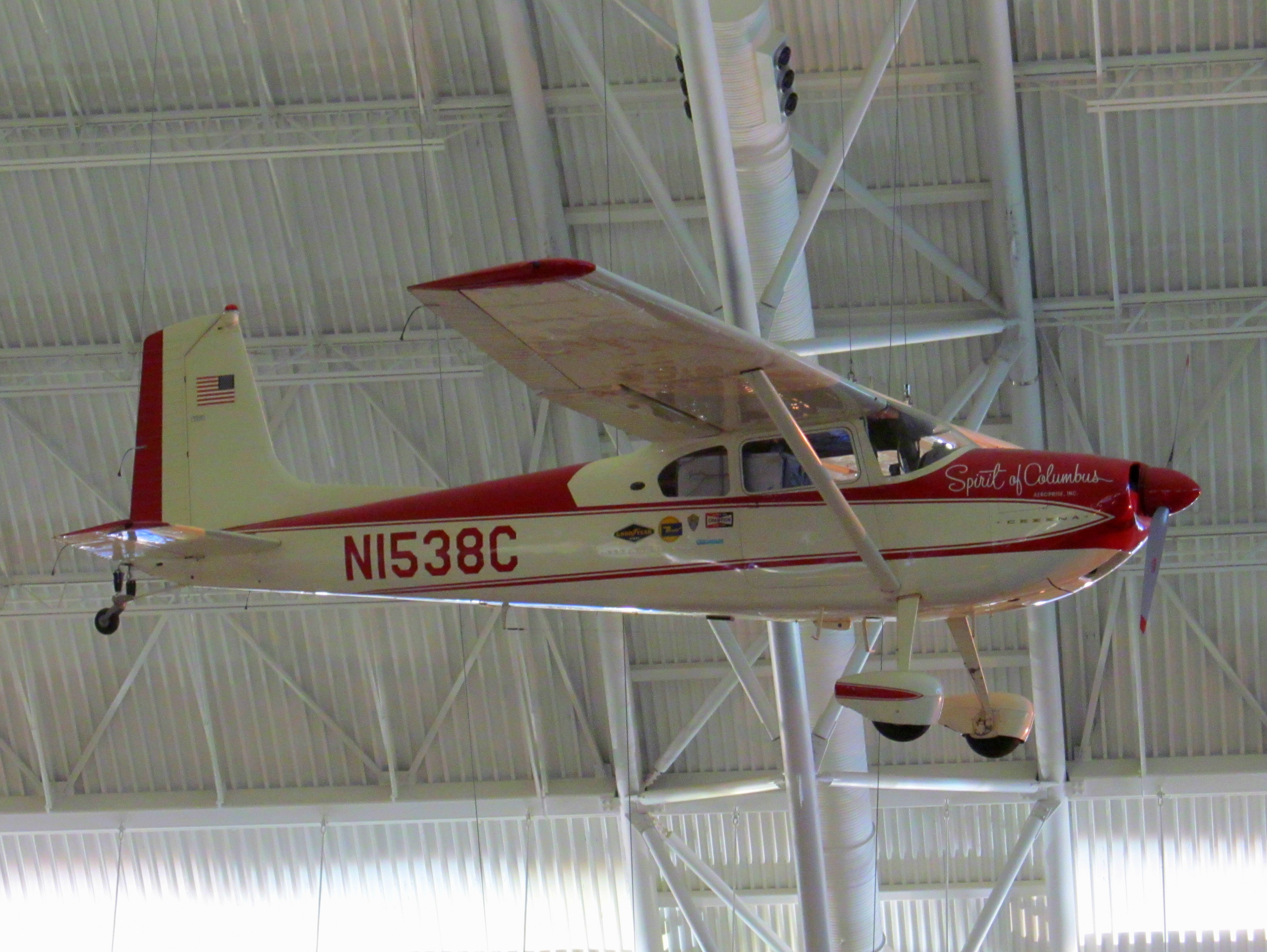
In 1964 Jerrie Mock became the first woman to fly solo around the world, taking off and landing her Spirit of Columbus at Port Columbus Airport (plane now exhibited at the Steven F. Udvar-Hazy Center).

In 1964 Jerrie Mock became the first woman to fly around the world. Flying solo in her Cessna 180 Skywagon named Spirit of Columbus, she took off from the Port Columbus airport on March 19, 1964, and arrived back 29 1/2 days later.

=== Recent improvements ===
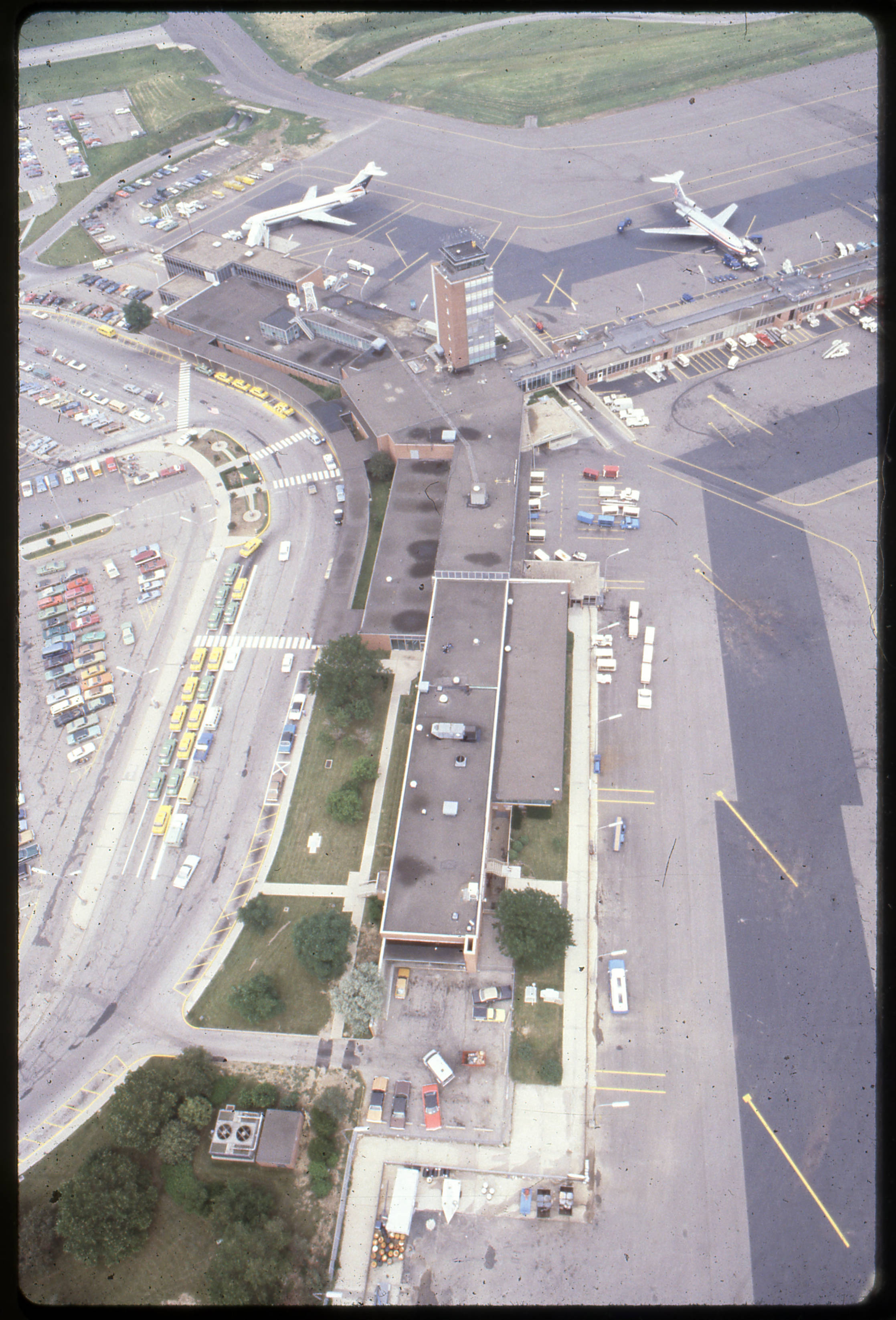
The airport's terminal in 1979

A $70 million renovation of airport facilities, designed by Brubaker/Brandt, was initiated in 1979 for the airport's 50th anniversary and completed in 1981. This upgraded the airport's capacity to 250 flights per day by adding what is known today as Concourse B and added fully enclosed jetways at every gate. Ten years later in 1989, a second, $15.5 million, seven-gate south concourse (now Concourse A) was dedicated. The concourse was used exclusively by US Airways at the time, and later housed hubs for both America West Airlines until 2003, and Skybus Airlines until they shut it down in 2008 due to their bankruptcy. A north concourse was completed in 1996, which is now Concourse C, and was expanded in 2002.

Between 1998 and 2000, numerous airport expansion and renovation projects were completed, including a $25 million terminal renovation in 1998 that included additional retail shops, new flight information displays, enhanced lighting, upgraded flooring, and a new food court. Also, new hangars and office spaces were completed for NetJets in 1999, as well as a $92 million parking garage including an underground terminal entrance, new rental car facilities, dedicated ground transportation area, improved eight-lane terminal access on two levels, and a new atrium and entrances in 2000, which were designed by URS Corporation.

On April 25, 2004, a new 195-foot (59 m) control tower directed its first aircraft. This began several major facility enhancements to be constructed through 2025. On October 21, 2010, a new arrivals/departures board replaced the old one in the main entrance area.

Columbus began its Terminal Modernization Program in late 2012, which included new terrazzo flooring throughout the airport, new ceilings, new restrooms, more TSA security lanes, and new LED lighting. Construction started on Concourse A in late 2012 and was completed throughout the terminal in early 2016.

In 2013, the airport completed a $140 million runway improvement that moved the south runway farther from the north runway. This created a buffer distance that enables simultaneous takeoffs and landings on the north and south runways, increasing air traffic volume. Columbus mayor Michael B. Coleman commented, "As the city grows, the airport needs to grow with it."

On May 25, 2016, the Ohio General Assembly passed a bill to rename the airport from Port Columbus International Airport to its current name, in honor of astronaut and four-term U.S. senator John Glenn. The name change was unanimously approved by the airport's nine-member board on May 24, 2016. Ohio Governor John Kasich signed the bill into law on June 14, 2016, with the name change becoming official 90 days later. On June 28, 2016, a celebration of the renaming was held and new signage bearing the airport's new name was unveiled.

In 2019, construction began on a new car rental facility at the airport, with an estimated budget of $140 million. This facility moves car rental out of the parking garage, opening up more spaces for travelers. The new building opened in late 2021, and utilizes electric buses to transport passengers.

=== Recent history ===
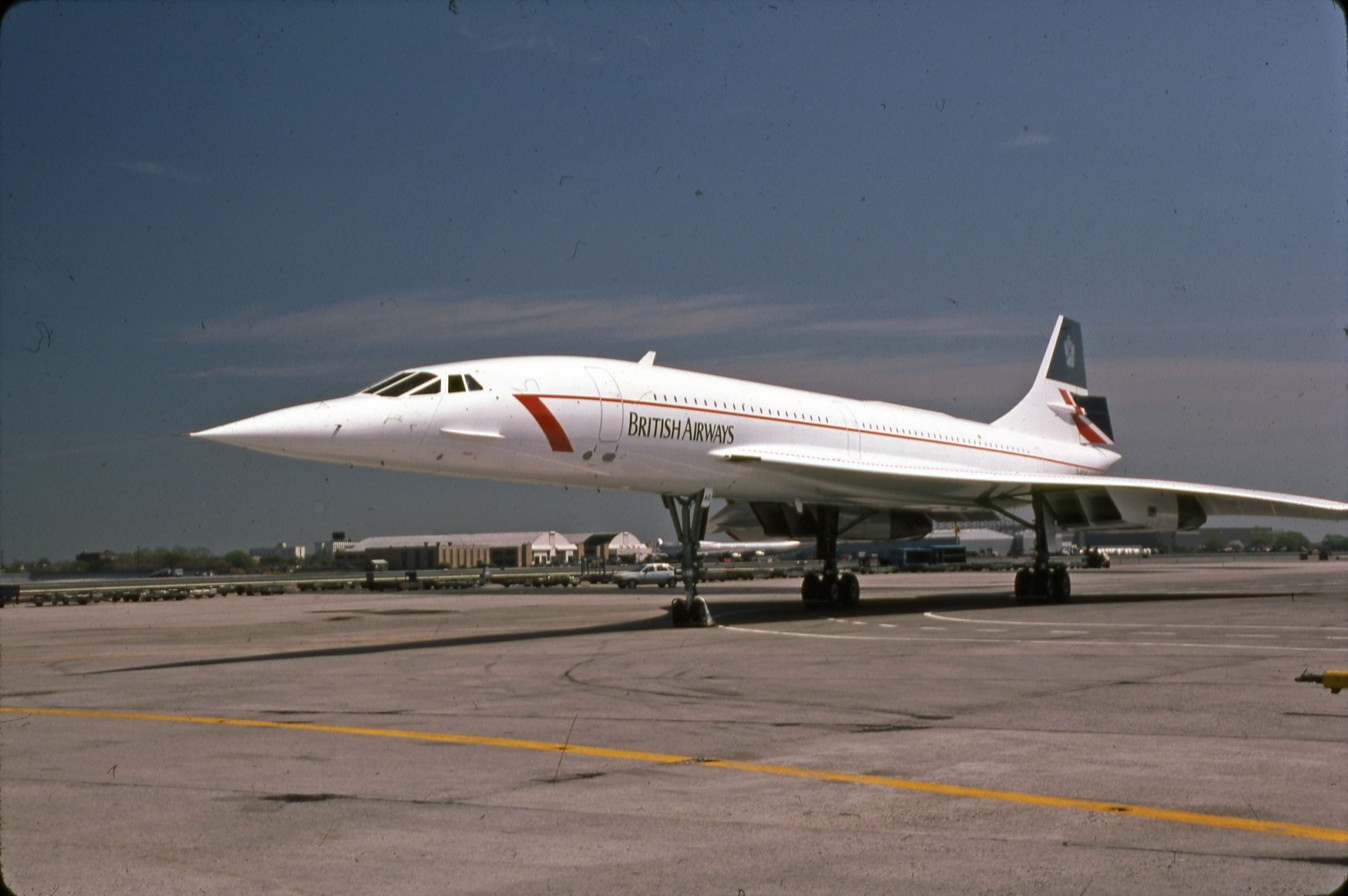
British Airways Concorde at Port Columbus International Airport in 1985

Many airlines introduced new routes in the late 2010s, with the addition of Spirit Airlines with multiple destinations and Alaska Airlines with one daily flight to Seattle. Occasionally, larger aircraft that the airport is not used to receiving on a regular basis, such as the Boeing 767 and 777, are chartered through John Glenn and serviced by Lane Aviation.

Due to the COVID-19 pandemic, many new, current, and to-be-expanded routes were canceled or reduced. Air Canada temporarily suspended service to Columbus, while airlines such as United, American, and Delta used smaller aircraft for some of their mainline routes. Many of these routes saw an increase of service in mid-2021 as restrictions lifted and demand for air travel grew.

Startup Breeze Airways also selected Columbus as one of its launch destinations in July 2021 with five routes. The airline added additional routes from the airport in May 2023. Sun Country Airlines announced a plan to fly to the airport during the 2023 summer season.

Plans have been in development for many years for a new terminal, set to begin construction in 2025 to replace the current, ageing building, beginning with the new car rental facility completed in 2021.

In spring 2023, the airport prepared for a record travel summer matching traffic levels from before the COVID-19 pandemic.

In late 2024, ground was broken on a new terminal building slated for a 2029 completion, and will replace the current terminal once it opens.

== Facilities ==
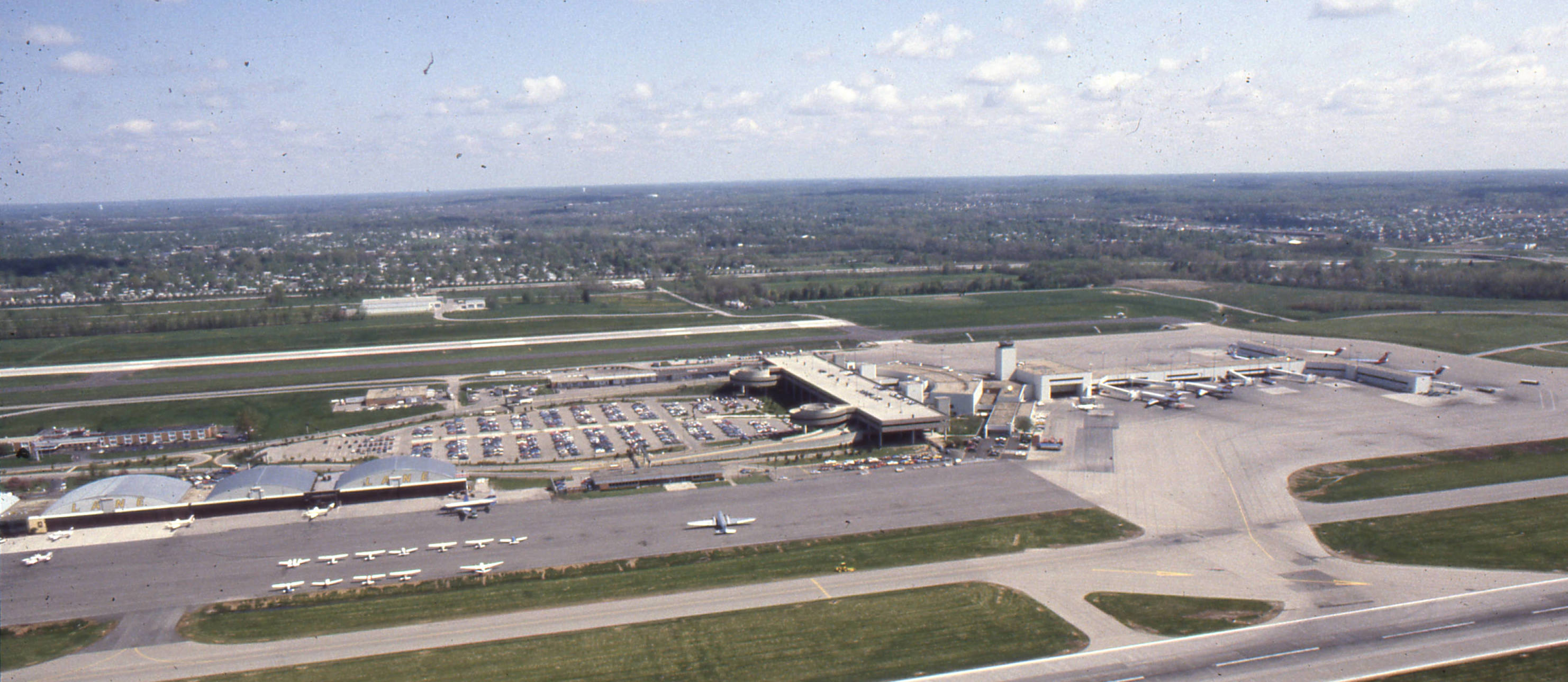
The airport in 1987, predominantly as it stands today

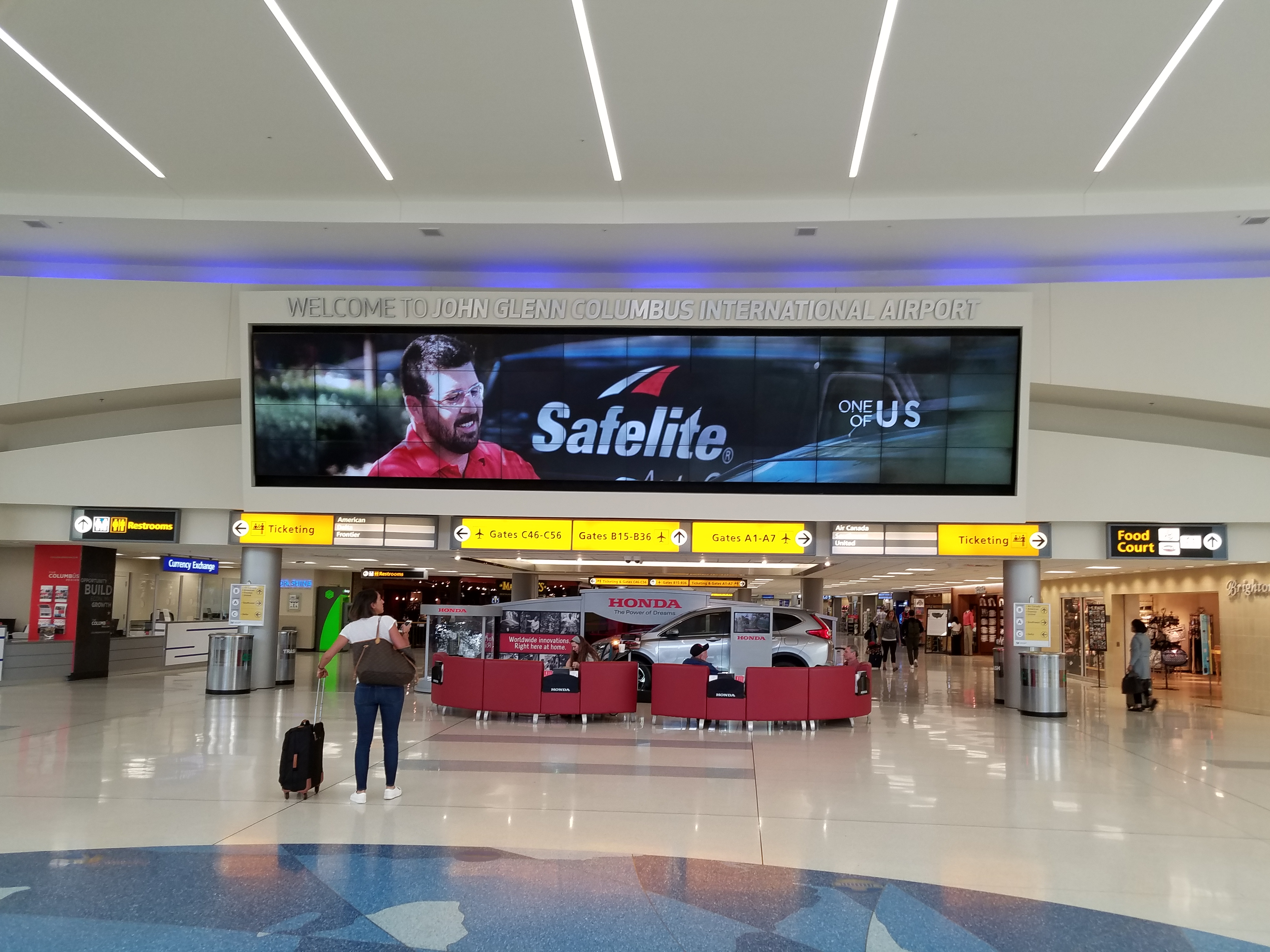
Main flight information board at the entrance to Concourse B

=== Terminal ===
==== Commercial terminal ====
John Glenn Columbus International Airport has one terminal with three concourses, and a total of 29 usable gates. The three concourses each have their own TSA security checkpoint, and are not connected airside (post-security). Non-precleared international flights arrive through Concourse C and are processed in the airport's customs facility.

- Concourse A contains 7 gates, and is used primarily by Southwest Airlines.
- Concourse B contains 16 gates, and is used primarily by American Airlines, Air Canada, and United Airlines.
- Concourse C contains 11 gates, and is used primarily by Alaska Airlines, Breeze Airways, Delta Air Lines, Frontier Airlines, JetBlue, Sun Country Airlines, and Viva (Seasonal Charter).

==== General aviation terminals ====
The airport has two fixed-base operators, which offer fuel (both avgas and jet fuel), aircraft parking, conference rooms, crew lounges, snooze rooms, showers, courtesy transportation, and more.

=== Ground transportation ===
The airport is accessible directly by taking exit number nine on Interstate 670 to International Gateway. Alternatively, drivers can also get to the airport from the east via Hamilton Road, just south of Interstate 270, and enter at Sawyer Road or from the west via Stelzer Road.

Connected to the terminal is a six-story parking garage that provides long-term and short-term parking. Lower cost satellite parking options, with continuous free shuttle service, can be found in the Blue, Red and Green parking lots along International Gateway. The Blue lot is the closest to the terminal and also offers some covered parking. The cost of parking a car in the blue lot is $9 per 24 hours. The Red Lot costs $7 per 24 hours and the green lost costs $5 per 24 hours to park. The Green lot is the furthest away from the terminal. Additionally, there is a free cell phone lot accessed from the outbound side of International Gateway.

The Columbus Metropolitan Area's bus service, the Central Ohio Transit Authority (COTA), has a bus service between the airport and downtown Columbus. COTA's 7 Mt. Vernon route is operated from downtown, with every other bus serving either the airport or Easton Transit Center.

The GoBus Rural Inter-City Bus Service operates a thrice daily schedule to Athens, via Lancaster, Logan, and Nelsonville.

Inbound taxi services operate through numerous taxi businesses in the Columbus area. A number of taxi services provide outbound transportation in the taxi lane.

=== Other facilities ===
In 2001, Executive Jet Aviation (now known as NetJets), opened up a 200,000-square-foot (19,000 m^{2}) operational headquarters.

In November 2006, Skybus Airlines began leasing 100,000 square feet (9,300 m^{2}) of office and hangar facilities at the Columbus International AirCenter adjacent to the airport.

Regional carrier Republic Airways operates a large crew and maintenance base at the airport.

The airport has its own police and fire departments (ARFF-C).

== CMH Next ==
CMH Next is an ongoing $2 billion infrastructure initiative managed by the Columbus Regional Airport Authority (CRAA) to replace the existing passenger terminal at John Glenn Columbus International Airport (IATA: CMH) in Columbus, Ohio. The project, breaking ground on December 9, 2024, features a new, nearly 1-million-square-foot centralized terminal designed to modernize facilities and increase capacity, with an estimated opening in early 2029.

=== Background and Rationale ===
The original terminal facility, operational since 1958, was deemed inefficient due to its fragmented layout with separate, non-connected concourses. The project, funded without new local taxes, was initiated to address rising passenger volumes and update infrastructure.

=== Design and Features ===
The new terminal, designed with a "Y-shaped" footprint reflecting the local river confluence, is built to accommodate up to 13 million annual passengers, marking a 50% increase in capacity. Key features include:

- Terminal Layout: 36 gates, including international facilities, and a centralized TSA checkpoint.
- Amenities: Enhanced dining/retail, 4,300 charging stations, and sensory rooms.
- Ground Transportation: A new 5,000-space parking garage with electric vehicle (EV) charging and a pedestrian connection to the existing rental car facility.

=== Construction and Timeline ===
Led by Hensel Phelps and Elford, construction includes a staged approach to allow for continuous airport operations, with the new terminal anticipated to open in 2029. Upon completion, the original 1958 terminal will be demolished to create additional aircraft parking, as detailed in the project's long-term plan.

== Airlines and destinations ==
=== Passenger ===
| Airlines | Destinations |
|---|---|
| Air Canada | Seasonal: Toronto–Pearson |
| Air Canada Express | Toronto–Pearson; Seasonal: Montréal–Trudeau |
| Alaska Airlines | Seattle/Tacoma |
| American Airlines | Charlotte, Dallas/Fort Worth, Los Angeles, Phoenix–Sky Harbor; Seasonal: Cancún, Philadelphia |
| American Eagle | Boston, Charlotte, Chicago–O'Hare, Dallas/Fort Worth, Miami, New York–JFK, New York–LaGuardia, Philadelphia, Washington–National |
| Breeze Airways | Charleston (SC), Greenville/Spartanburg, Hartford, Myrtle Beach (begins May 28, 2027), Raleigh/Durham, Savannah, Tampa; Seasonal: Fort Myers, Jacksonville (FL), Norfolk, Orange County, Portland (ME), Punta Cana (begins January 8, 2027) |
| Delta Air Lines | Atlanta, Minneapolis/St. Paul, Salt Lake City |
| Delta Connection | Austin, Boston, Detroit, Minneapolis/St. Paul, New York–JFK, New York–LaGuardia; Seasonal: Orlando |
| Frontier Airlines | Atlanta; Seasonal: Denver, Fort Lauderdale, Orlando |
| JetBlue | Fort Lauderdale |
| Lufthansa | Frankfurt (begins May 5, 2027) |
| Southwest Airlines | Atlanta, Austin, Baltimore, Chicago–Midway, Dallas–Love, Denver, Fort Lauderdale, Fort Myers, Houston–Hobby, Las Vegas, Nashville, Orlando, Phoenix–Sky Harbor, San Diego, Sarasota, St. Louis, Tampa, Washington–National; Seasonal: Cancún, Kansas City, Miami, Panama City (FL), Punta Cana (begins March 13, 2027), San Juan (begins February 13, 2027) |
| Sun Country Airlines | Seasonal: Minneapolis/St. Paul |
| United Airlines | Chicago–O'Hare, Denver, Houston–Intercontinental, Los Angeles, San Francisco; Seasonal: Washington–Dulles |
| United Express | Chicago–O'Hare, Houston–Intercontinental, Newark, Washington–Dulles |
| Viva | Seasonal: Cancún |

== Statistics ==
Airports with direct service to and from John Glenn Columbus International Airport: Single regular service Seasonal only Upcoming or resuming Combination Columbus

=== Top destinations ===
Busiest domestic routes from CMH (January 2025 - December 2025)
| Rank | City | Passengers | Carriers |
|---|---|---|---|
| 1 | Atlanta, Georgia | 421,410 | Delta, Frontier, Southwest |
| 2 | Chicago–O'Hare, Illinois | 331,190 | American, United |
| 3 | Orlando, Florida | 283,050 | Frontier, Southwest |
| 4 | Denver, Colorado | 229,730 | Frontier, Southwest, United |
| 5 | New York–LaGuardia, New York | 210,380 | American, Delta |
| 6 | Dallas/Fort Worth, Texas | 197,840 | American |
| 7 | Charlotte, North Carolina | 184,350 | American |
| 8 | Phoenix-Sky Harbor, Arizona | 151,500 | American, Southwest |
| 9 | Fort Lauderdale, Florida | 141,980 | Frontier, Southwest |
| 10 | Las Vegas, Nevada | 138,380 | Southwest |

=== Airline market share ===
Airline market share (January 2025 – December 2025)
| Rank | Carrier | Passengers | Percentage |
|---|---|---|---|
| 1 | Southwest Airlines | 2,768,000 | 31.85% |
| 2 | Republic Airways | 1,437,000 | 16.53% |
| 3 | American Airlines | 949,000 | 10.93% |
| 4 | Delta Air Lines | 928,000 | 10.68% |
| 5 | United Airlines | 667,000 | 7.68% |
| 6 | Other | 1,940,000 | 22.33% |

=== Annual passenger traffic ===
Annual passenger traffic at CMH 1994–present
| Year | Passengers | % Change |
|---|---|---|
| 1994 | 5,439,820 | — |
| 1995 | 5,636,549 | ▲3.6% |
| 1996 | 6,275,587 | ▲11.3% |
| 1997 | 6,517,222 | ▲3.9% |
| 1998 | 6,420,037 | ▼1.5% |
| 1999 | 6,541,851 | ▲1.9% |
| 2000 | 6,882,485 | ▲5.2% |
| 2001 | 6,670,897 | ▼3.1% |
| 2002 | 6,741,354 | ▲1.1% |
| 2003 | 6,252,061 | ▼7.3% |
| 2004 | 6,232,332 | ▼0.3% |
| 2005 | 6,611,575 | ▲6.1% |
| 2006 | 6,733,990 | ▲1.9% |
| 2007 | 7,719,340 | ▲14.6% |
| 2008 | 6,910,045 | ▼10.5% |
| 2009 | 6,233,485 | ▼9.8% |
| 2010 | 6,366,191 | ▲2.1% |
| 2011 | 6,378,722 | ▲0.2% |
| 2012 | 6,350,974 | ▼0.4% |
| 2013 | 6,236,528 | ▼1.8% |
| 2014 | 6,355,974 | ▲1.9% |
| 2015 | 6,795,978 | ▲6.9% |
| 2016 | 7,324,180 | ▲7.8% |
| 2017 | 7,576,592 | ▲3.4% |
| 2018 | 8,141,656 | ▲7.5% |
| 2019 | 8,637,108 | ▲6.1% |
| 2020 | 3,269,127 | ▼62.2% |
| 2021 | 5,822,322 | ▲78.1% |
| 2022 | 7,455,031 | ▲28.0% |
| 2023 | 8,375,281 | ▲12.3% |
| 2024 | 8,965,614 | ▲7.0% |
| 2025 | 9,014,264 | ▲0.5% |

== Accidents and incidents ==
- On May 16, 1948, a Slick Airways Curtiss C-46 Commando crashed near CMH because of failure of the rudder and the failure of the fuselage carry-in structure beneath the vertical fin because of extreme turbulence. Both occupants died.
- On June 27, 1954, an American Airlines Convair CV-240 (N94263) from Dayton International Airport was on approach to Runway 27 at 300 feet (91 m) when the left side of the plane collided with a US Navy Beechcraft SNB-2C Navigator (BuA23773), also on approach. The Convair recovered and landed, though the nose gear collapsed on landing. The Beechcraft crashed short of the runway, two on board died. The probable cause was attributed to a "traffic control situation created by the tower local controller which he allowed to continue without taking the necessary corrective action. A contributing factor was the failure of both crews to detect this situation by visual and/or aural vigilance."
- On January 7, 1994, United Express Flight 6291, a BAe Jetstream 41 being operated by Atlantic Coast Airlines, was on approach to runway 28L when it entered into a stall at 430 feet (130 m) above runway level. The aircraft collided with a stand of trees and came to rest inside a commercial building 1.2 miles (1.9 km) short of the runway and burst into flames. All three crewmembers and two of five passengers died. The probable cause was attributed to "(1) An aerodynamic stall that occurred when the flight crew allowed the airspeed to decay to stall speed following a very poorly planned and executed approach characterized by an absence of procedural discipline; (2) Improper pilot response to the stall warning, including failure to advance the power levers to maximum, and inappropriately raising the flaps; (3) Flight crew experience in 'glass cockpit' automated aircraft, aircraft type and in seat position, a situation exacerbated by a side letter of agreement between the company and its pilots; and (4) the company's failure to provide adequate stabilized approach criteria, and the FAA's failure to require such criteria. Member Vogt concluded that the last factor was contributory but not causal to the accident. Additionally, for the following two factors, Chairman Hall and Member Lauber concluded that they were causal to the accident, while Members Vogt and Hammerschmidt concluded they were contributory to the accident: (5) The company's failure to provide adequate crew resource management training, and the FAA's failure to require such training; and (6) the unavailability of suitable training simulators that precluded fully effective flight crew training."
- On April 23, 1998, a Beech 58 was destroyed and consumed by fire after it collided with terrain during approach to the CMH airport; the pilot died. The probable cause of the accident was found to be the pilot's inadequate planned approach and his failure to follow wake turbulence avoidance procedures by not staying above the glide-path of the preceding Boeing 757, which resulted in a vortex turbulence encounter.
- On September 26, 2005, a Cessna 560XL Citation Excel sustained substantial damage when the nose landing gear collapsed during taxi for takeoff at CMH. The cause for the collapse could not be determined.
- On October 7, 2007, a Cessna 210C Centurion sustained substantial damage during a gear-up landing following a loss of hydraulic system fluid. The pilot stated that the landing gear did not extend when he attempted to lower it during landing approach. The pilot then used the "emergency pump system" and noticed that only the main landing gear partially extended. The flaps did not extend. The pilot subsequently reported performing a gear-up landing. The probable cause of the accident was found to be a hydraulic system pump leak, which resulted in the failure of the emergency landing gear system to extend and lock the landing gear for landing and the flap system.

== See also ==
- Brushstrokes in Flight, a 1984 Roy Lichtenstein sculpture displayed at the airport
