= Rickenbacker International Airport =

International Airport near Columbus, Ohio

- IATA: LCK; ICAO: KLCK; FAA LID: LCK

Summary
- Airport type: Public
- Owner/Operator: Columbus Regional Airport Authority
- Serves: Greater Columbus
- Location: Franklin / Pickaway counties, near Columbus, Ohio
- Opened: June 1942; 84 years ago
- Hub for: AirNet Express; Amerijet International
- Occupants: 121st Air Refueling Wing Ohio Military Reserve Ohio Army National Guard Army Aviation Support Facility No. 2
- Time zone: UTC−05:00 (-5)
  - Summer (DST): UTC−04:00 (-4)
- Elevation AMSL: 744 ft (227 m)
- Coordinates: 39°48′50″N 082°55′40″W
- Public transit access: 22, 24, Great Blue, Red, Green shuttles
- Website: Cargo: flycolumbus.com/cargo/ Passengers: flycolumbus.com/passengers/rickenbacker-passengers/

Maps
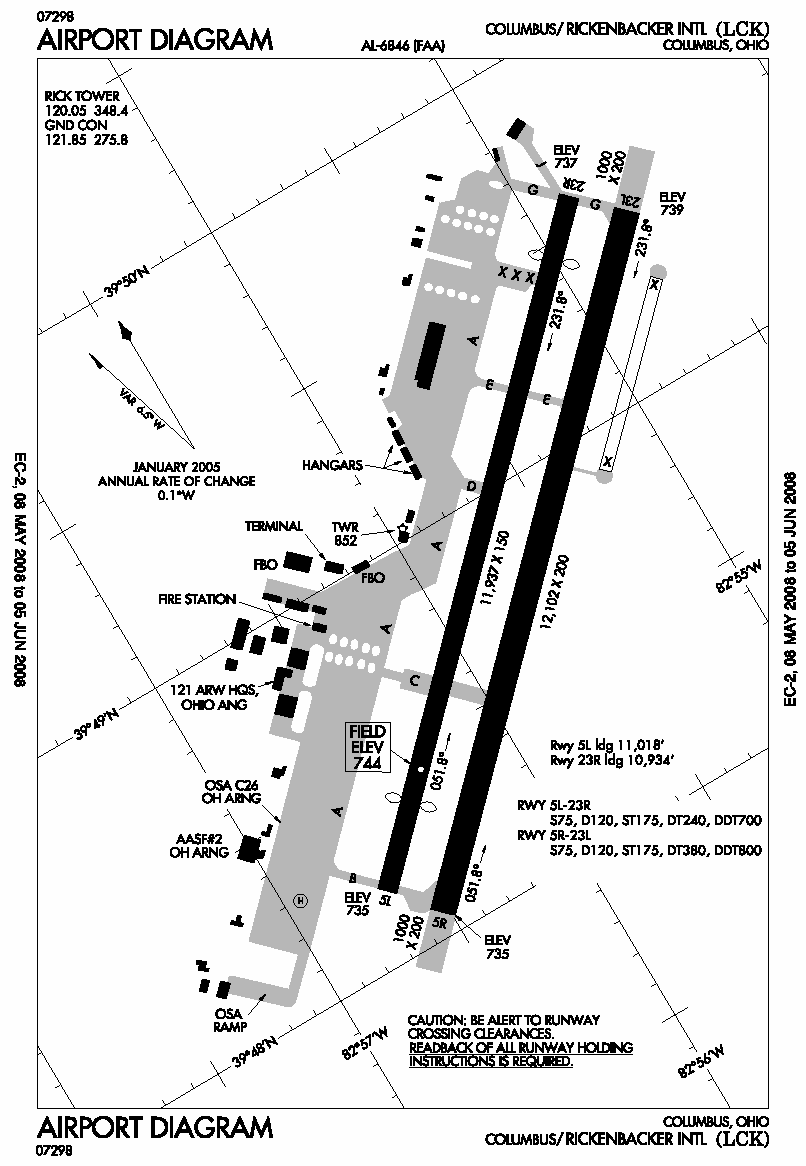
- FAA airport diagram
- Interactive map of Rickenbacker International Airport

Runways
Direction	Length		Surface
Direction	ft	m	Surface
05R/23L	12,103	3,689	Asphalt/concrete
05L/23R	11,902	3,638	Asphalt

Helipads
Number	Length		Surface
Number	ft	m	Surface
H1	50	15	Concrete

Statistics (2022)
- Aircraft operations: 24,168
- Based aircraft: 50
- Source: Federal Aviation Administration

Rickenbacker International Airport (IATA: LCK, ICAO: KLCK, FAA LID: LCK) is a civil-military public airport 10 miles (16 km) south of downtown Columbus, near Lockbourne in southern Franklin County, Ohio, United States. The south end of the airport extends into Pickaway County. The base was named for flying ace and Columbus native Eddie Rickenbacker. It is managed by the Columbus Regional Airport Authority, which also operates John Glenn Columbus International Airport and Bolton Field. Rickenbacker International is primarily a cargo airport for the city of Columbus, although since 2012 it has served an increasing number of passenger flights primarily by Allegiant Airlines as well as charter carriers.

The United States Air Force maintains a presence in the form of the Ohio Air National Guard's 121st Air Refueling Wing. Rickenbacker International is also home of the Ohio Army National Guard's Army Aviation Support Facility No. 2 and the headquarters for the Ohio Military Reserve, one of the state defense forces of Ohio.

In 1999 and 2007, the airport held Gatherings of Mustangs and Legends. Dozens of Mustang airplanes attended each time. The airport also hosted the Columbus Air Show in 2023.

== History ==
The facility opened in June 1942 as Lockbourne Army Airfield, named for the nearby village of Lockbourne.

In 2015, Cathay Pacific Cargo and Emirates SkyCargo boosted their services at the airport to support growth at the airport. Thanks to their additional service, logistics company Morrison Express launched operations at Rickenbacker in 2016 to support them.

A new Air Traffic Control tower was opened at the airport in 2016.

In 2018, the airport launched a $565,000 improvement project to boost the efficiency of its jetways. New ground power units and pre-conditioned air units were installed. Funding was provided largely from an FAA grant awarded as part of its Voluntary Airport Low Emissions program, which helps airports meet air quality standards set by the US Clean Air Act.

That same year, the company upgraded its animal transport facility to ensure operational efficiency and animal safety. The facility earned U.S. Department of Agriculture (USDA) status as both a certified Export Inspection Facility and a Permanent Port of Embarkation for livestock. The upgrade included 12 new animal stalls and an on-site USDA office.

In 2020, Rickenbacker was one of the most cost-effective small commercial airports in the country for passengers. It ranked as the third-cheapest airport of its size that year. The COVID-19 pandemic brought historical traffic levels to the airport. Monthly international arrivals peaked at 120 in 2020 and even higher in 2021 as airlines brought medical cargo in to the airport. 2021 was the airport's best year to date due to the COVID-19 pandemic's impact on cargo aviation. It was named the 2021 Airport of the Year by the Ohio Aviation Association for its role in bringing emergency protective equipment, its record-breaking shipments of international cargo, and receiving its first passenger aircraft converted for cargo.

Rickenbacker took part in an FAA research project on drones in 2021. It was one of five airports to participate in the agency’s Airport Unmanned Aircraft Systems Detection and Mitigation Research Program.

== Operations ==
Rickenbacker was run by the Rickenbacker Port Authority, until merging in 2003 with Port Columbus and Bolton field creating the Columbus Regional Airport Authority. In July 2006, Rickenbacker was ranked as the world's 126th busiest cargo airport according to Air Cargo World.

== Facilities and aircraft ==
Rickenbacker International Airport covers 4,342 acres (1,757 ha) and has two runways and one helipad:

- Runway 05R/23L: 12,103 ft × 200 ft (3,689 m × 61 m), surface: asphalt/concrete
- Runway 05L/23R: 11,902 ft × 150 ft (3,628 m × 46 m), surface: asphalt
- Helipad H1: 50 ft × 50 ft (15 m × 15 m), surface: concrete

In the year ending December 31, 2022, the airport had 24,168 aircraft operations, average 66 per day: 52% commercial, 35% general aviation, and 14% military. At the time, 50 aircraft were based at the airport: 32 military aircraft, 10 jets, 4 single-engine, and 4 multi-engine airplanes.

The airport has a fixed-base operator that offers fuel – both avgas and jet fuel – as well as services such as conference rooms, a crew lounge, snooze rooms, showers, and courtesy transportation.

In December 2006, PlanetSpace entered negotiations with the Ohio government to build a spaceport at Rickenbacker. The company has since been dissolved by the Government of Canada.

Also in 2006, the Columbus Regional Airport Authority completed a noise compatibility study for the airport. This program helps to guide suggested flight paths and targets soundproofing of buildings exposed to high levels of aircraft noise.

AirNet Express headquarters is at the airport.

In 2008, Norfolk Southern opened the Rickenbacker Intermodal Terminal next to the airport. This facility allows the handling of approximately 250,000 Intermodal containers annually and anchors Norfolk Southern's Heartland Corridor. The project allows easy access to and from the deep water port at Norfolk, Virginia via the use of double stack containers as well as improved access to rail hubs in the Chicago area.

In February 2022, Kintetsu World Express opened a sales office at the airport.

Old Rickenbacker Tower

== Airlines and destinations ==
Since the completion of the current passenger terminal in 2003, Rickenbacker has acted as a secondary airport for Columbus and has seen a number of carriers come and go, including Southeast Airlines, Boston-Maine Airways, Hooters Air, Direct Air, USA3000 Airlines, Fly Mission Air, and Vision Airlines. In 2012, low-cost carrier Allegiant Air launched service to Sanford and St. Petersburg, Florida, and has since been successful in expanding service to ten additional leisure destinations in the Southern United States. Today, Allegiant is the sole passenger airline in Rickenbacker.

Multiple major cargo airlines, including a number of international carriers, have operated at Rickenbacker International Airport.

=== Passenger ===
Airlines	Destinations	Refs
Allegiant Air	Fort Lauderdale, Orlando/Sanford, Punta Gorda (FL), Sarasota, Savannah, St. Petersburg/Clearwater; Seasonal: Destin/Fort Walton Beach, Key West (as of May 2026), Myrtle Beach	

==== Destinations map ====
Passenger Destinations Map
Passenger destinations from Rickenbacker International Airport
Year-round destination
Seasonal destination
Future destination

=== Cargo ===
Cargolux had flights from Hong Kong to Rickenbacker, and from Rickenbacker to Luxembourg, as recently as February 2024, but these flights were dropped from their March 2024 published schedule.

Cathay Cargo launched twice-weekly service from Hong Kong to Rickenbacker in 2014, but Rickenbacker is not listed on their current schedule. In August 2023, scheduled Cathay Cargo freighter service to Columbus/LCK was suspended, with capacity shifted to Toronto.

Emirates SkyCargo offered scheduled service to Rickenbacker for over five years, starting in May 2015, but as of October 2026 does not currently offer scheduled service to Rickenbacker.

Airlines	Destinations
Castle Aviation	Akron/Canton (charter)
FedEx Express	Indianapolis, Memphis
FedEx Feeder	Indianapolis
Korean Air Cargo	Seoul–Incheon

== Statistics ==
=== Top destinations ===
Busiest domestic routes from LCK (October 2024 – September 2025)
Rank	City	Passengers	Carriers
1	St. Petersburg/Clearwater, Florida	27,880	Allegiant
2	Punta Gorda/Fort Myers, Florida	27,450	Allegiant
3	Orlando/Sanford, Florida	24,300	Allegiant
4	Sarasota, Florida	18,920	Allegiant
5	Destin–Fort Walton Beach, Florida	17,040	Allegiant
6	Savannah, Georgia	16,080	Allegiant
7	Myrtle Beach, South Carolina	15,110	Allegiant
8	Fort Lauderdale, Florida	11,360	Allegiant
9	Charleston, South Carolina	2,300	Allegiant

== Motor racing ==
In 1953 and 1954 the airport was used for two meetings organized by the Sports Car Club of America.

== Accidents and incidents ==
- On December 5, 2007, a Cessna 208 Super Cargomaster crashed after departure from Rickenbacker. The airplane received its takeoff clearance at 06:48 and departed at 06:50. Radar track data indicated that the airplane climbed to about 1,100 feet mean sea level (msl) and was in a left turn with a ground speed of about 109 knots prior to descending and impacting the terrain. The airplane impacted terrain on an approximate heading of 120 degrees. The probable cause of the accident was found to be the pilot's failure to maintain aircraft control and collision avoidance with terrain due to spacial disorientation. Contributing to the accident were the low cloud ceiling and night conditions.
- On September 1, 2008, a Convair CV-580 was destroyed when it impacted terrain as it was attempting to return to the Rickenbacker International Airport after departure. The accident flight was the first flight following a maintenance Phase 1 and Phase 2 check, which included flight control cable rigging as part of the check. The flight was also intended to provide cockpit familiarization for the first officer and the observer, and a training flight for the first officer. One minute after departure the flight contacted ATC and stated that it needed to return to LCK. It was cleared to land and declined standby emergency equipment. When the airplane was approximately turning to the base leg, it was about 187 feet agl on a southerly heading with a 196-knot ground speed. About 1206, the airplane impacted a cornfield about one mile southwest of the approach end of runway 5L. The probable cause of the accident was found to be the improper (reverse) rigging of the elevator trim cables by company maintenance personnel, and their subsequent failure to discover the misrigging during required post-maintenance checks.
- On June 19, 2011, a Cirrus SR-22 collided with the terrain following a loss of control shortly after takeoff from the Rickenbacker International Airport. The controller stated he watched the airplane takeoff and begin a left turn into the clouds. The controller then instructed the pilot to contact departure control, but the pilot never made the switch, and smoke appeared on the southwest side of the airport. A line person who fueled the airplane and a fireman who worked at the airport both reported that the airplane engine sounded normal prior to the accident. The probable cause of the accident was found to be the pilot's spatial disorientation during the takeoff into instrument meteorological conditions, which resulted in his failure to maintain control of the airplane.
- On May 9, 2014, a Cessna 525C was substantially damaged during an engine start at Rickenbacker International Airport. The flight crew had initiated a start sequence on the left engine when witnesses outside the airplane notified them of a fire in the left engine. The flight crew then shut down both engines, closed the left firewall shutoff, activated the fire bottle, and all four occupants evacuated through the main cabin door. The fire continued to burn and was extinguished by fire fighting crews. The probable cause of the incident was found to be the flight crew’s decision to attempt an engine start in conditions that exceeded the engine's maximum allowable ground start crosswind component limitation.

== See also ==
- Central Air Defense Force (Air Defense Command)
- 121st Air Refueling Wing
- List of airports in Ohio
