= List of airline codes (S) =

This is a list of all airline codes. The table lists the IATA airline designators, the ICAO airline designators and the airline call signs (telephony designator). Historical assignments are also included for completeness.

== Codes ==
Airline codes
IATA	ICAO	Airline	Call sign	Country	Comments
	SRD	His Majesty's Coastguard		United Kingdom	Operates fixed- and rotary-wing assets in the maritime aerial search and rescue, contracted to private operators
	OMN	Servicios Aereos Ominia	SERVIOMNIA	Mexico	2014
	SEN	Servicios de Aviacion Sierra	SERVISIERRA	Mexico	2014
	SGC	SGC Aviation	SAINT GEORGE	Austria	2014
	SCJ	Siamjet Aviation	SIAMJET	Thailand	2014
	SIX	Sixt Rent A Car	DRIVE ORANGE	United States	2014
	SOG	Solenta Aviation Ghana		Ghana	2014
	QSR	SR Jet	SPARKLE ROLL	China	2014
	KBN	Spiracha Aviation	KABIN	Thailand	2014
	CBN	Southern Illinois University as "Aviation Flight"	CARBONDALE	United States	Allocated in 2014
	IBG	Springfield Air	ICE BRIDGE	United States	Allocated 2014
	BZQ	Seneca Polytechnic	STING	Canada	Operates as part of the Bachelor of Aviation program. Allocated 2014
	BVV	Spark+	SPARC	Russia	
	SJM	Sino Jet Management	SINO SKY	China	
	SCH	Seychelles Airlines	OCEAN BIRD	Seychelles	
	BYF	San Carlos Flight Center	BAY FLIGHT	United States	
	SXT	Servicios de Taxi Aereos	SERTAXI	Mexico	
TR	TGW	Scoot	SCOOTER	Singapore	Former IATA: TZ Former ICAO: SCO; Adopted Tigerair codes after their merger
IJ	SJO	Spring Airlines Japan	JEY SPRING	Japan	
	SBD	SIBIA Aircompany Ltd	SIBIA	Russia	
	SHT	British Airways Shuttle	SHUTTLE	United Kingdom	
6Y	ART	Smartlynx Airlines	SMART LYNX	Latvia	
	MYX	SmartLynx Airlines Estonia	TALLINN CAT	Estonia	
QS	TVS	Smartwings	SKYTRAVEL	Czech Republic	formerly named Travel Service
7O	TVL	Smartwings Hungary	TRAVEL SERVICE	Hungary	formerly named Travel Service Hungary
3Z	TVP	Smartwings Poland	JETTRAVEL	Poland	formerly named Travel Service Poland
6D	TVQ	Smartwings Slovakia	SLOVAKTRAVEL	Slovakia	formerly named Travel Service Slovakia
	DES	Servicios Aereos Especializados Destina	DESTINA	Mexico	
	LSV	Slovenian Ministry of Defence		Slovenia	
	FUF	Servicios Aereos Fun Fly	SERVIFUN	Mexico	
E3	VGO	Sabaidee Airways	VIRGO	Thailand	
	SAQ	Safe Air Company		Kenya	
	SMU	Sanborn Map Company	SPRINGER	United States	
	RBR	Siam Airnet	SIAM AIRNET	Thailand	
	SVB	Siavia	SIAVIA	Slovenia	
	MHQ	Skargardshavets Helikoptertjanst	HELICARE	Finland	
	BIS	Sky Bishek	JUMA AIR	Kyrgyzstan	
	SYH	Sky Handling		Ukraine	
GG	KYE	Sky Lease Cargo	SKY CUBE	United States	
	KPM	Sky Prim Air	SKY PRIMAIR	Moldova	
BQ	SWU	Sky Alps	SKYALPS	Italy	
	BSJ	Skybus Jet	SKYBUS JET	Bahamas	
GW	SGR	SkyGreece Airlines	SKYGREECE	Greece	Defunct; Ceased operations 27 August 2015
	USW	Special Aviation Works	AKSAR	Uzbekistan	
SH	SHA	Sharp Airlines	SHARP	Australia	Uses unregistered ICAO & IATA.
N9	SHA	Shree Airlines	SHREEAIR	Nepal	
7E	AWU	Sylt Air GmbH	SYLT-AIR	Germany	
	BDS	South Asian Airlines	SOUTH ASIAN	Bangladesh	
OL	SZB	Samoa Air	SAMOA	Samoa	
	BEC	State Air Company Berkut		Kazakhstan	
S4	RZO	SATA International	AIR AZORES	Portugal	
SA	SAA	South African Airways	SPRINGBOK	South Africa	
	KYD	Sky Messaging	SKYAD	South Africa	
	SAB	Sky Way Air	SKY WORKER	Kyrgyzstan	
KV	SKV	Sky Regional Airlines	MAPLE	Canada	
	SAC	SASCO Airlines	SASCO	Sudan	
	SAG	SOS Flygambulans	MEDICAL AIR	Sweden	
W7	SAH	Sayakhat Airlines	SAYAKHAT	Kazakhstan	
NL	SAI	Shaheen Air	SHAHEEN AIR	Pakistan	Defunct; Ceased operations on 8 October 2018
MM	SAM	SAM Colombia	SAM	Colombia	Defunct; Ceased operations on 4 October 2010
	SAN	Servicios Aéreos Nacionales (SAN)	AEREOS	Ecuador	Defunct; Ceased operations in 1999
	SAO	Sahel Aviation Service	SAVSER	Mali	
	ANX	Secretaria de Marina	SECRETARIA DEMARINA	Mexico	
	SAQ	Springbank Aviation	SPRINGBANK	Canada	
SK	SAS	Scandinavian Airlines	SCANDINAVIAN	Sweden, Denmark and Norway	
	SAV	Samal Air		Kazakhstan	
	SAW	Cham Wing Airlines	SHAMWING	Syrian Arab Republic	
SA	SAX	Sabah Air	SABAH AIR	Malaysia	
	SAY	Suckling Airways	SUCKLING	United Kingdom	Defunct; Integrated into Loganair in March 2013
	SAZ	Swiss Air-Ambulance	SWISS AMBULANCE	Switzerland	A subsidiary of Swiss Air-Rescue Rega
	SBA	SOL Linhas Aéreas	SOL	Brazil	
PI	SGU	Sol del Paraguay	SOLPARAGUAYO	Paraguay	Defunct; Ceased operations on 15 July 2011
	SBA	STA-MALI	STA-MALI	Mali	Defunct
	SBB	Steinman Aviation	SABER EXPRESS	United States	
UG	TUX	Tunisair Express	TUNEXPRESS	Tunisia	
	SBF	Seven Bar Flying Service	SEVENAIR	Tunisia	
	SBG	Sabre Incorporated		United States	
S7	SBI	S7 Airlines	SIBERIAN AIRLINES	Russia	
	SBL	Sobel Airlines of Ghana	SOBGHANA	Ghana	
Q7	SBM	SkyBahamas	SKY BAHAMAS	Bahamas	Defunct; Ceased operations on 8 July 2019
4E	SBO	Stabo Air	STABAIR	Zambia	
	SBQ	SmithKline Beecham Clinical Labs	SKIBBLE	United States	
	SBR	Saber Aviation	FREIGHTER	United States	
BB	SBS	Seaborne Airlines	SEABORNE	United States	
PV	SBU	St Barth Commuter	BLACK FIN	France	
	URJ	Star Air	STARAV	Pakistan	
S5	SDG	Star Air (India)	HISTAR	India	
JX	SJX	Starlux Airlines	STARWALKER	Taiwan	
	SBZ	Scibe Airlift	SCIBE AIRLIFT	Democratic Republic of the Congo	
	AME	Spanish Air Force	AIRMIL	Spain	
	SCA	South Central Air	SOUTH CENTRAL	United States	
	SCC	SeaCoast Airlines	SEA-COASTER	United States	
K5	SQH	SeaPort Airlines (2008–2016)	SASQUATCH	United States	Former airline: Wings of Alaska now part of SeaPort Airlines. Alternative callsign: WINGS (for VFR flights only). Former ICAO code: WAK.
YR	SCE	Grand Canyon Scenic Airlines	SCENIC	United States	
	SCF	Socofer	SOCOFER	Angola	
	SCI	Servicios Aéreos San Cristóbal	SAN CRISTOBAL	Mexico	
	SCK	Sky Cam	SKYCAM	France	
W3	SCL	Switfair Cargo	SWIFTAIR	Canada	
	SCB	Saigon Capital Aircraft Management	SAIGON	Netherlands	
	SCN	South American Airlines	SOUTH AMERICAN	Peru	
	AHI	Servicios Aéreos de Chihuahua Aerochisa	AEROCHISA	Mexico	
FP	AND	Servicios Aéreos de los Andes	SERVI ANDES	Peru	2014
	SCP	Scorpio Aviation	SCORPIO	Egypt	
	SCQ	OSM Aviation Academy	SCAVAC	Norway, Sweden and San Diego	
	SIC	SFS Aviation	SICHART	Thailand	
	SCR	Silver Cloud Air	SILVER CLOUD	Germany	
	SCS	South African Non Scheduled Airways	SOUTHERN CHARTERS	South Africa	
	SCT	SAAB-Aircraft	SAAB-CRAFT	Sweden	
	SCV	Servicios Aéreos Del Centro	SACSA	Mexico	
SY	SCX	Sun Country Airlines	SUN COUNTRY	United States	
	SDA	St. Andrews Airways	SAINT ANDREWS	Canada	
	SDB	Sukhoi Design Bureau Company	SU-CRAFT	Russia	
	SDC	Sunrise Airlines	SUNDANCE	United States	
	SDD	Skymaster Air Taxi	SKY DANCE	United States	
	SDE	Air Partners Corp.	STAMPEDE	Canada	
	SDF	Sundorph Aeronautical Corporation	SUNDORPH	United States	
	SDH	Servicio De Helicopteros	ARCOS	Spain	
	SDK	SADELCA Ltda.	SADELCA	Colombia	
	SDL	Skydrift	SKYDRIFT	United Kingdom	
	SDN	Spirit of Africa Airlines	BLUE NILE	Sudan	
	SDU	Sud Airlines	SUD LINES	France	Defunct; Ceased operations in July 2008
	SDV	Servicios Aéreos Del Vaupes	SELVA	Colombia	
	SDX	Servicio Tecnico Aero De Mexico	SERVICIO TECNICO	Mexico	
	SDZ	Sudan Pezetel for Aviation	SUDANA	Sudan	
	SEA	Southeast Air	SOUTHEAST AIR	United States	
	SEB	Servicios Aéreos Luce	SERVILUCE	Mexico	
	SED	Sedona Air Center	SEDONA AIR	United States	
	SEE	Shaheen Air Cargo	SHAHEEN CARGO	Pakistan	
	SEH	Sky Express	AIR CRETE	Greece	
SG	SEJ	Spicejet	SPICEJET	India	
	SEK	Skyjet	SKALA	Kazakhstan	
	SEL	Sentel Corporation	SENTEL	United States	
	SEO	Selcon Airlines	SELCON AIR	Nigeria	
I6	SEQ	Sky Eyes	SKY EYES	Thailand	
	SES	Servicio Aéreo Saltillo	SERVISAL	Mexico	
EH	SET	SAETA Air Ecuador	SAETA	Ecuador	Defunct; Ceased operations in February 2000
	SEV	Serair Transworld Press	CARGOPRESS	Spain	
	SFA	SEFA	SEFA	France	defunct - absorbed into École Nationale de l'Aviation Civile, with new ICAO code NAK
	SFC	Shuswap Flight Centre	SHUSWAP	Canada	
	SFE	Sefofane Air Charters	SEFOFANE	Botswana	Rebranded "Wilderness Air"
	SFF	Safewings Aviation Company	SWIFTWING	United States	
	SFG	Sun Freight Logistics	AERO GULF	Thailand	
7G	SFJ	StarFlyer	STARFLYER	Japan	
	SFL	Southflight Aviation	SOUTHFLIGHT	New Zealand	
	SFN	Safiran Airlines	SAFIRAN	Iran	
	SFP	Safe Air	SAFE AIR	Pakistan	
FA	SFR	Safair	CARGO	South Africa	
	SFS	Southern Frontier Airlines	SOUTHERN FRONTIER	Canada	
	SFT	Skyfreight	SKYFREIGHT	United States	
	SFU	Solent Flight	SAINTS	United Kingdom	
	SFX	S.K. Logistics	SWAMP FOX	United States	
	SGB	Songbird Airways, Inc.	SONGBIRD	United States	Defunct; Ceased operations on 7 February 2017
	SGC	Southern Right Air Charter	SOUTHERNRIGHT	South Africa	
	SGD	Skygate International Aviation	AIR BISHKEK	Kyrgyzstan	
	SGF	STAC Swiss Government Flights	STAC	Switzerland	
	SGH	Servisair	SERVISAIR	United Kingdom	
	SGI	Servicios Aéreos Agrícolas	SERAGRI	Chile	
	SGK	Skyward Aviation	SKYWARD	Canada	
	SGM	Sky Aircraft Service	SIGMA	Netherlands	
	SGN	Siam GA	SIAM	Thailand	Defunct; Ceased operations 30 May 2014
	SGP	Sagolair Transportes Ejecutivos	SAGOLAIR	Spain	
	SGS	Saskatchewan Government Executive Air Service	SASKATCHEWAN	Canada	
	SGT	Skygate	SKYGATE	Netherlands	
	SGU	Samgau	RAUSHAN	Kazakhstan	
	SGX	Saga Airlines		Turkey	
N5	SGY	Skagway Air Service	SKAGWAY AIR	United States	
	SHB	Shabair	SHABAIR	Democratic Republic of the Congo	
	SHC	Sky Harbor Air Service	SKY HARBOR CHEYENNE	United States	
	SHD	Sahara Airlines		Algeria	
	SHE	Shell Aircraft	SHELL	United Kingdom	
	SHG	Shoprite Group	SHOP AIR	United Kingdom	
	SHJ	Sharjah Ruler's Flight	SHARJAH	United Arab Emirates	
	SHK	Shorouk Air		Egypt	
	SHL	Samson Aviation	SAMSON	United Kingdom	
	SHM	Sheltam Aviation	SHELTAM	South Africa	
	SHN	Shaheen Airport Services	SUGAR ALFA	Pakistan	
	SHO	Sheremetyevo-Cargo		Russia	
	SHP	Service Aerien Francais	SAF	France	
	SHQ	Shanghai Airlines Cargo	SHANGHAI CARGO	China	
	SHR	Shooter Air Courier	SHOOTER	Canada	
	SHS	Shura Air Transport Services	SHURA AIR	Ethiopia	
HZ	SHU	Sakhalinskie Aviatrassy (SAT)	SATAIR	Russia	
SP	SAT	SATA Air Acores	SATA	Portugal	
8S		Scorpio Aviation			
	SHV	Shavano Air	SHAVANO	United States	
	SHW	Shawnee Airline	SHAWNEE	United States	Air South
	SHX	Slim Aviation Services	SLIM AIR	Nigeria	
ZY	SHY	Sky Airlines	ANTALYA BIRD	Turkey	
SQ	SIA	Singapore Airlines	SINGAPORE	Singapore	
5M	SIB	Sibaviatrans	SIBAVIA	Russia	
	SIE	Sierra Express	SEREX	United States	
SI	SIH	Skynet Airlines	BLUEJET	Ireland	2001–2004
	SIJ	Seco International		Japan	
3M	SIL	Silver Airways	SILVER WINGS	United States	
	SIL	Servicios Aeronáuticos Integrales	SERVICIOS INTEGRALES	Mexico	
	SIM	Star Air		Sierra Leone	
	SIO	Sirio (airline)	SIRIO	Italy	
	SIR	Salair	SALAIR	United States	
	SIS	Saber Airlines		Egypt	
XS	SIT	SITA		Belgium	
	SIV	Slovenian Armed Forces	SLOVENIAN	Slovenia	
	SIW	Sirio Executive	SIRIO EXECUTIVE	Italy	
	SJA	Servicios Aéreos Especiales De Jalisco	SERVICIOJAL	Mexico	
	SJC	Servicios Ejecutivos Continental	SERVIEJECUTIVO	Mexico	
	SJE	Sunair 2001	SUNBIZ	South Africa	
	SJJ	Spirit Aviation	SPIRIT JET	United States	
	SJL	Servicios Especiales Del Pacifico Jalisco	SERVICIOS JALISCO	Mexico	
	SJT	Swiss Jet	SWISS JET	Switzerland	
SJ	SJY	Sriwijaya Air	SRIWIJAYA	Indonesia	
ZS	SMY	Sama Airlines	NAJIM	Saudi Arabia	
	ALC	Southern Jersey Airways, Inc.	ACOM	United States	
	SPS	Spark Shuttle	Spark Shuttle	United States	
	SPT	Speed Aviation	SPEED AVIATION	Bangladesh	
	SPU	Southeast Airmotive	SPUTTER	United States	
	SPV	Servicios Privados De Aviación	SERVICIOS PRIVADOS	Mexico	
	SPW	Speedwings	SPEEDWING	Switzerland	
	SPX	Spark Express (Glow)	Glow|United States		
	SQA	Slovak National Aeroclub	SLOVAK AEROCLUB	Slovakia	
SQ	SQC	Singapore Airlines Cargo	SINGCARGO	Singapore	
	SQF	Slovak Air Force	SLOVAK AIRFORCE	Slovakia	
	SQL	Servicos De Alquiler	ALQUILER	Mexico	
	SRA	Sair Aviation	SAIR	Canada	
	SRC	Searca	SEARCA	Colombia	
FT	SRH	Siem Reap Airways	SIEMREAP AIR	Cambodia	Defunct; Ceased operations on 1 December 2008
SX	SRK	Sky Work Airlines	SKYFOX	Switzerland	
SM	SRL	Swedline Express	Starline	Sweden	Ceased operations 2006
	SRL	Servicios Aeronáuticos Aero Personal	SERVICIOS PERSONAL	Mexico	
	SRN	Sirair	SIRAIR	Russia	
P8	SRN	SprintAir	SPRINTAIR	Poland	
	SRO	Servicios Aéreos Ejecutivos Saereo	SAEREO	Ecuador	
	SRQ	Cebgo	BLUE JAY	Philippines	Subsidiary of Cebu Pacific
	SRS	Selkirk Remote Sensing	PHOTO CHARLIE	Canada	
	SRU	Star Up	STAR-UP	Peru	
	SRW	Sarit Airlines	SARIA	Sudan	Currently operates as Badr Airlines with IATA code J4 and ICAO designator BDR
	SRX	Sierra Expressway Airlines	SIERRA EX	United States	
	SRZ	Strato Air Services	STRATO	South Africa	
	SSB	Sasair	SASIR	Canada	
	SSC	Southern Seaplane	SOUTHERN SKIES	United States	
	SSD	Star Service International	STAR SERVICE	France	
	SSE	Servicios Aéreos Sunset	SUNSET	Mexico	
D2	SSF	Severstal Air Company	SEVERSTAL	Russia	
	SSG	Slovak Government Flying Service	SLOVAK GOVERNMENT	Slovakia	
VD	BBB	SwedJet Airways	BLACKBIRD	Sweden	
	SSK	Skystar International	SKYSTAR	United States	
	SSO	Special Scope Limited	DOPE	United Kingdom	
	SSP	Starspeed	STARSPEED	United Kingdom	
QF	SSQ	Sunstate Airlines	SUNSTATE	Australia	Uses IATA of parent QANTAS.
	SSR	Sardinian Sky Service	SARDINIAN	Italy	
	SSS	SAESA	SAESA	Spain	
	SST	Sunwest Airlines	SUNFLIGHT	Canada	
	SSU	SASCA	SASCA	Venezuela	
5G	SSV	Skyservice Airlines	SKYTOUR	Canada	defunct
	SSW	Streamline Aviation	STREAMLINE	United Kingdom	
	SSY	Sky Aviation	SIERRA SKY	Sierra Leone	
	SSZ	Specsavers Aviation	SPECSAVERS	United Kingdom	
	STA	Star Aviation	STAR	United Kingdom	
	STB	Status-Alpha Airline	STATUS-ALPHA	Ukraine	
	STC	Stadium City Limited	STADIUM	United Kingdom	
	STD	Servicios De Aerotransportacion De Aguascalientes	AERO AGUASCALINETES	Mexico	
	STE	Semitool Europe	SEMITRANS	United Kingdom	
	STF	SFT-Sudanese Flight		Sudan	
	STG	Sedalia, Marshall, Boonville Stage Line	STAGE	United States	
	STH	South-Airlines		Armenia	
	STI	Sontair	SONTAIR	Canada	
	STJ	Sella Aviation	STELLAVIA	Netherlands	
RE	STK	Stobart Air	STOBART	Ireland	Defunct; Ceased operations on 12 June 2021
	STL	Stapleford Flight Centre	STAPLEFORD	United Kingdom	
	STO	Streamline Ops	SLOPS	Russia	
	STQ	Star Air	STERA	Indonesia	
FS	STU	Servicios de Transportes Aéreos Fueguinos	FUEGUINO	Argentina	ICAO and call sign not current
	STU	Star African Air	STARSOM	Somali Republic	
	SUU	Star West Aviation	SUNSTAR	United States	
	STV	Saturn Aviation	SATURN	United States	
	STW	South West Air Corporation	SIERRA WHISKEY	Philippines	
	STX	Stars Away Aviation	STARSAWAY	South Africa	
	STY	Styrian Airways	STYRIAN	Austria	
	SUA	Silesia Air	AIR SILESIA	Czech Republic	
	SUB	Suburban Air Freight	SUB AIR	United States	
SD	SUD	Sudan Airways	SUDANAIR	Sudan	
PI	SUF	Sun Air (Fiji)	SUNFLOWER	Fiji	
LW	FDY	Sun Air International	FRIENDLY	United States	
	SUG	Sunu Air	SUNU AIR	Senegal	
	SUH	Sun Light	LIGHT AIR	Kyrgyzstan	
	SUI	Swiss Air Force	SWISS AIR FORCE	Switzerland	
	SUK	Superior Aviation Services	SKYCARGO	Kenya	
	SUM	State Unitary Air Enterprise	SUMES	Russia	
	SUR	Sun Air		Egypt	
EZ	SUS	Sun-Air of Scandinavia	SUNSCAN	Denmark	
	SUT	Summit Air	SUMMIT	Canada	
	URF	Surf Air	SURF AIR	United States	
	SUT	Sistemas Aeronauuticos 2000	SISTEMAS AERONAUTICOS	Mexico	
	SUV	Sundance Air	DANCEAIR	Venezuela	
SV	SVA	Saudia	SAUDIA	Saudi Arabia	
	SVD	St. Vincent Grenadines Air (1990)	GRENADINES	Saint Vincent and the Grenadines	
	SVF	Swedish Armed Forces	SWEDEFORCE	Sweden	
	AWJ	Sahel Airlines	SAHEL AIRLINES	Niger	
	SVH	Sterling Helicopters	SILVER	United Kingdom	
	SVI	Servicios De Transporte Aéreo	SETRA	Mexico	
	SVJ	Silver Air		Djibouti	
	SVL	Sevastopol-Avia	SEVAVIA	Ukraine	
	SVN	Savanair (Angola)	SAVANAIR	Angola	
	SVO	Servicios Aeronáuticos de Oriente	SERVIORIENTE	Mexico	Defunct; Ceased operations in 2002
	SVS	Servicios Aéreos Saar	AEREOS SAAR	Mexico	
	SVT	Seven Four Eight Air Services	SIERRA SERVICES	Luxembourg	
	SVX	Security Aviation	SECURITY AIR	United States	
WN	SWA	Southwest Airlines	SOUTHWEST	United States	
	SWB	Swissboogie Parapro	SWISSBOOGIE	Switzerland	
	SWC	South West Air	SAINT CLAIR	Canada	
A4	SWD	Southern Winds Airlines	SOUTHERN WINDS	Argentina	Defunct; Ceased operations 5 December 2005
	SWE	Swedeways	SWEDELINE	Sweden	
		Spurling Aviation	AIR SEATTLE	United States	Code was ASL
WG	SWG	Sunwing Airlines	SUNWING	Canada	
	SWI	Sunworld Airlines	SUNWORLD	United States	
	SWJ	StatesWest Airlines	STATES	United States	
	SWO	Surinam International Victory Airline	SIVA	Suriname	defunct
	SWP	Star Work Sky	STAR WORK	Italy	
WQ	SWQ	Swift Air (Interstate Equipment Leasing)	SWIFTFLIGHT	United States	
LX	SWR	Swiss International Air Lines	SWISS	Switzerland	
SR	SWR	Swissair	SWISSAIR	Switzerland	Defunct; Ceased operations 31 March 2002
SR	SDR	Sundair	SUNDAIR	Germany	
	SWS	Sunwest Aviation (Lindquist Investment)	SUNNY WEST	United States	Also operates under ICAO code CNK, callsign CHINOOK in Canada
	SWT	Swiftair	SWIFT	Spain	
LZ	SWU	Swiss Global Air Lines	EUROSWISS	Switzerland	Defunct; Reintegrated into Swiss International Air Lines on 19 April 2018
WV	SWV	Swe Fly	FLYING SWEDE	Sweden	
S8	SWW	Shovkoviy Shlyah	WAY AERO	Ukraine	
Q4	SWX	Swazi Express Airways	SWAZI EXPRESS	Swaziland	
WO	WSW	Swoop	SWOOP	Canada	Defunct; Integrated into WestJet on 28 October 2023
	SWY	Sky Jet	SWISSLINK	Switzerland	
	SWZ	Servair, Private Charter	SWISSBIRD	Switzerland	Code re-allocated
S8	SWZ	Skywise Airline	SKYWISE	South Africa	Defunct; Ceased operations on 10 November 2015
	SXA	Southern Cross Aviation	FERRY	United States	
	SXC	Sky Exec Aviation Services	SKY EXEC	Nigeria	
	SXE	Southeast Express Airlines	DOGWOOD EXPRESS	United States	
	SXM	Servicios Aéreos Especializados Mexicanos	SERVIMEX	Mexico	
XQ	SXS	SunExpress	SUNEXPRESS	Turkey	
	SXT	Servicios De Taxi Aéreo	SERTA	Mexico	
	SXX	Satellite Aero	SATELLITE EXPRESS	United States	
	SXY	Safari Express Cargo	SAFARI EXPRESS	Kenya	
	SYA	Skyways	LINEAS CARDINAL	Argentina	
	SYC	Systec 2000	SYSTEC	United States	
	SYE	Sheba Aviation		Yemen	
	SYF	Sky One Express Airlines	SKY FIRST	United States	
	SYG	Synergy Aviation	SYNERGY	United Kingdom	
	SYI	Sonalysts		United States	
	SYJ	Slate Falls Airways		Canada	
	SYK	Satsair	AEROCAB	United States	(J and A Properties)
	SYN	Syncrude Canada	SYNCRUDE	Canada	
RB	SYR	Syrian Arab Airlines	SYRIANAIR	Syrian Arab Republic	
	SYS	Shawbury Flying Training Unit	SHAWBURY	United Kingdom	
	SYV	Special Aviation Systems	SPECIAL SYSTEM	United States	
AL	SYX	Skywalk Airlines	SKYWAY-EX	United States	(Astral Aviation)
ZP	AZQ	Silk Way Airlines	SILK LINE	Azerbaijan	
7L	AZG	Silk Way West Airlines	SILK WEST	Azerbaijan	
	SYY	South African Historic Flight	SKY COACH	South Africa	
	SZT	Servicios Aeronáuticos Z	AERO ZEE	Mexico	
	BHV	Specavia Air Company	AVIASPEC	Russia	
	BLY	Starair	BLARNEY	Ireland	
	BNC	Sundance Air	BARNACLE AIR	United States	
E5	BRZ	Samara Airlines	BERYOZA	Russia	defunct
E5	RBG	Air Arabia Egypt	ARABIA EGYPT	Egypt	
	CBN	Swedish Civil Aviation Administration	CALIBRATION	Sweden	
SC	CDG	Shandong Airlines	SHANDONG	China	
	CDS	Spectrem Air	SPECDAS	South Africa	
	CEE	Servicios Aéreos Centrales	CENTRA AEREOS	Mexico	
	CFL	Swedish Airlines	SWEDISH	Sweden	
	CGL	Seagle Air	SEAGLE	Slovakia	
	CIG	Sirius-Aero	SIRIUS AERO	Russia	
	CNK	Sunwest Home Aviation	CHINOOK	Canada	
SK	CNO	SAS Braathens	SCANOR	Norway	
9C	CQH	Spring Airlines	AIR SPRING	China	
3U	CSC	Sichuan Airlines	SI CHUAN	China	
FM	CSH	Shanghai Airlines	SHANGHAI AIR	China	Part of China Eastern Airlines
	CSY	Shuangyang General Aviation	SHUANGYANG	China	
ZH	CSZ	Shenzhen Airlines	SHENZHEN AIR	China	
8C	CXI	Corendon Airlines Europe	TOURIST	Malta	
	DKT	Sioux Falls Aviation	DAKOTA	United States	
	DKY	Servicios Aéreos Elite	DAKOY	Spain	
	DNI	Servicios Aéreos Denim	AERO DENIM	Mexico	
	EAB	Swiss Eagle	SWISS EAGLE	Switzerland	
	EAN	Skypower Express Airways	NIGERIA EXPRESS	Nigeria	Express Airways Nigeria
	ENR	Scenic Air		Namibia	
7L	ERO	Sun D'Or	ECHO ROMEO	Israel	
NE	ESK	SkyEurope	RELAX	Slovakia	defunct
CQ	EXL	Sunshine Express Airlines		Australia	
	EXY	South African Express	EXPRESSWAYS	South Africa	
	FFD	Stuttgarter Flugdienst	FIRST FLIGHT	Germany	
	FFH	Shalom Air Services	PEACE AIR	Nigeria	
	FJE	Silverjet	ENVOY	United Kingdom	
	FLH	Sky Bus	MILE HIGH	United States	
	GAD	South Coast Aviation	SOUTHCOAST	United Kingdom	
	GDE	Servicios Aéreos Gadel	GADEL	Mexico	
	GDG	S.P. Aviation	GOLDEN GATE	United States	
	GIK	Seba Airlines	SEBA	Guinea	
	GNA	Servicios Aéreos Gana	SERVIGANA	Mexico	
	GSW	Sky Wings Airlines		Greece	
	GXL	Star XL German Airlines	STARDUST	Germany	
	HAU	Skyhaul	SKYHAUL	Japan	
	HIP	Starship	STARSA	Mexico	
	HJE	Servicios Ejecutivos Gosa	GOSA	Mexico	
SO	HKA	Superior Aviation	SPEND AIR	United States	
	HLO	Samaritan Air Service	HALO	Canada	
KI	SJB	SKS Airways	SOUTHER TIGER	Malaysia	Operates scheduled flights to outlying islands from Subang Airport to Redang and Tioman.
	HRI	Skyraidybos Mokymo Centras	HELIRIM	Lithuania	
	HSK	Sky Europe Airlines	MATRA	Slovakia	
	HSV	Svenska Direktflyg	HIGHSWEDE	Sweden	
	HSY	Sky Helicopteros	HELISKY	Spain	
TE	IGA	Skytaxi	IGUANA	Poland	
	IJS	Silvair		United States	
	ILS	Servicios Aéreos Ilsa	SERVICIOS ILSA	Mexico	
	INK	Sincom-Avia	SINCOM AVIA	Ukraine	
	IRV	Safat Airlines	SAFAT AIR	Iran	
	IRZ	Saha Airlines Services	SAHA	Iran	
	JAM	Sunline Express	SUNTRACK	Kenya	
	JCM	Secure Air Charter	SECUREAIR	United States	
	JIM	Sark International Airways	SARK	United Kingdom	
JK	JKK	Spanair	SPANAIR	Spain	defunct
	KKS	Salem	KOKSHE	Kazakhstan	
	KOP	Servicios Aéreos Copters	COPTERS	Chile	
	KSP	Servicios Aéreos Expecializados En Transportes Petroleros	SAEP	Colombia	
	KYR	Sky Aeronautical Services	SKY AERONAUTICAL	Mexico	
	LGU	Servicios Aéreos Ejecutivos De La Laguna	LAGUNA	Mexico	
	LLA	Servico Leo Lopex	LEO LOPOZ	Mexico	
	LLS	Servicios Aéreos Estrella	SERVIESTRELLA	Mexico	
	LMG	South African Air Force	SOUTH AFRICAN	South Africa	
	LMO	Sky One Holdings as Privaira	SKY HOLDINGS	United States	Callsign and company name changed from Sky Limo Corporation "SKY LIMO" in 2015.
RZ*	LRS	Sansa		Costa Rica	
	LSP	Spectrum Aviation Incorporated	AIR TONY	United Kingdom	
	MCG	SOS Helikoptern Gotland	MEDICOPTER	Sweden	
	MDT	Sundt Air	MIDNIGHT	Norway	
	MLO	Servicios Aéreos Milenio	MILENIO	Mexico	
	MMS	SAAD (A320) Limited	MUSAAD AIR	Cayman Islands	
	MRI	Servicios Aéreos Moritani	MORITANI	Mexico	
2G*	MRR	San Juan Airlines	MARINER	United States	
	MSG	Servico Aéreo Regional	SAR-REGIONAL	Mozambique	
	MSP	Servicio De Vigilancia Aérea Del Ministerio De Seguridad Pública	SEGURIDAD	Costa Rica	
	MTG	Servicios Aéreos MTT		Mexico	
1Z	APD	Sabre Pacific		Australia	
1S		Sabre		United States	
1I		Sierra Nevada Airlines		United States	
1H		Siren-Travel		Russia	
1Q		Sirena		Russia	
	SBW	Snowbird Airlines	SNOWMAN	Finland	
1K		Southern Cross Distribution		Australia	
1K		Sutra		United States	
2C		SNCF		France	
2S		Star Equatorial Airlines		Guinea	
	NAD	Seulawah Nad Air	SEULAWAH	Indonesia	
	NAZ	Servicios Aéreos del Nazas S.A. de C.V.	NAZAS	Mexico	
	NCS	Simpson Air Ltd	COMMUTER-CANADA	Canada	
NK	NKS	Spirit Airlines	SPIRIT WINGS	United States	
	NON	Servicios Aéreos Latinoamericanos	SERVICIOS LATINO	Mexico	
	NRZ	Servicios Aéreos Monarrez	MONARREZ	Mexico	
	NSC	Societe De Transport Aerien De Mauritanie	TRANS-SOCIETE	Mauritania	
	NSE	SATENA	SATENA	Colombia	
	NTB	Servicios Aéreos Del Norte	SERVINORTE	Mexico	
	NTG	Servicios Integrales De Aviación	INTEGRALES	Mexico	
S0	OKS	Slok Air Gambia	SLOK GAMBIA	Gambia	
	OKT	Soko Aviation	SOKO AIR	Spain	
	OLC	Solar Cargo	SOLARCARGO	Venezuela	
	OLO	Soloflight Aviation	SOLO	United Kingdom	Defunct; Dissolved 20 July 2010
	ONG	Sonnig SA	SONNIG	Switzerland	
SO	OSL	Sosoliso Airlines	SOSOLISO	Nigeria	Defunct; Ceased operations in 2006
	OSS	Servicios Aéreos Noticiosos	NOTICIOSOS	Mexico	
	OTL	South Airlines	SOUTHLINE	Ukraine	
VA	VOZ	Virgin Australia Regional Airlines	VELOCITY	Australia	Operated under Virgin Australia
	PIV	Sokol	AEROSOKOL	Russia	
	PLT	South Carolina Aeronautics Commission	PALMETTO	United States	
	PMR	Servicios Aéreos Premier	SERVICIOS PREMIER	Mexico	
	PNS	Survey Udara (Penas)	PENAS	Indonesia	
	POB	Servicios Aéreos Poblanos	POBLANOS	Mexico	
5S	PSV	Servicios Aéreos Profesionales	PROSERVICIOS	Dominican Republic	
	PTM	Southeastern Airways	POSTMAN	United States	
	PUR	Spurwing Airlines	SPURWING	South Africa	
1I	PZR	Sky Trek International Airlines	PHAZER	United States	
	RBW	Shandong Airlines Rainbow Jet	CAI HONG	China	
	REJ	SA Airlink Regional	REGIONAL LINK	South Africa	
	RER	Servicio Aéreo Regional Regair	REGAIR	Ecuador	
	RFT	Scoala Superioara De Aviatie Civila	ROMANIAN ACADEMY	Romania	
	RGC	Servicios Aéreos Regiomontanos	REGIOMONTANO	Mexico	
	RLS	S-Air	S-AIRLINES	Russia	
	RMP	Servicios De Rampa Y Mostrador	SERAMSA	Mexico	
	RSE	SNAS Aviation	RED SEA	Saudi Arabia	
SX	SKB	Skybus Airlines	SKYBUS	United States	defunct
	SKC	Skymaster Airlines	SKYMASTER AIR	Brazil	
	SKD	Sky Harbor Air Service	SKY DAWG	United States	
	SKE	Sky Tours	SKYISLE	United States	
	AZG	Sakaviaservice	SAKSERVICE	Georgia	Defunct
	SKF	Skycraft	SKYCRAFT	United States	
	SKG	Skycraft Air Transport	SKYCRAFT-CANADA	Canada	
RU	SKI	SkyKing Turks and Caicos Airways	SKYKING	Turks and Caicos Islands	IATA was QW
	SKK	Skylink Aviation	SKYLINK	Canada	
	SKL	Skycharter (Malton)	SKYCHARTER	Canada	
	SKN	Skyline Aviation Services	SKYLINER	United States	
	SKO	Scottish Airways Flyers	SKYWORK	United Kingdom	
	SKR	Skyscapes Air Charters	SKYSCAPES	South Africa	
	SKS	Sky Service	SKY SERVICE	Belgium	Callsign re-allocated
	SKS	Sky Link Aviation		Pakistan	
S3	BBR	Santa Barbara Airlines	SANTA BARBARA	Venezuela	
XT	SKT	SkyStar Airways	SKY YOU	Thailand	
H2	SKU	Sky Airline	AEROSKY	Chile	
OO	SKW	SkyWest Airlines	SKYWEST	United States	
JZ	SKX	Skyways Express	SKY EXPRESS	Sweden	Ceased operations 2012; Operations continue as Avia Express
BC	SKY	Skymark Airlines	SKYMARK	Japan	
	SKZ	Skyway Enterprises	SKYWAY-INC	United States	
LJ	SLA	Sierra National Airlines	SELAIR	Sierra Leone	
	SLB	Slok Air	SLOK AIR	Nigeria	
	SLD	Silver Air	SILVERLINE	Czech Republic	
	SLE	Streamline	SLIPSTREAM	South Africa	
	SLF	Starfly	ELISTARFLY	Italy	
	SLG	Saskatchewan Government	LIFEGUARD	Canada	Air Ambulance Service
	SLH	Silverhawk Aviation	SILVERHAWK	United States	
	AGE	Servicios Aéreos de Los Ángeles	AEROANGEL	Mexico	
MI	SLK	SilkAir	SILKAIR	Singapore	Merged with Singapore Airlines
6Q	SLL	Slovak Airlines	SLOV LINE	Slovakia	Defunct; Ceased operations in February 2007
PY	SLM	Surinam Airways	SURINAM	Suriname	
	SLN	Sloane Aviation	SLOANE	United Kingdom	
	SLP	Salpa Aviation	SALPA	Sudan	
	SLS	Servicios Aéreos Slainte	SERVICIOS SLAINTE	Mexico	
	SLV	Stella Aviation	AVISTELLA	Mauritania	
	SLW	Salama Airlines Nigeria	SALMA AIR	Nigeria	
	SLX	Sete Linhas Aéreas	SETE	Brazil	
	SLY	Sky Line for Air Services	SKYCO	Sudan	
	SLZ	Super Luza	LUZA	Angola	
	SMA	SMA Airlines	SESAME	Nigeria	
	SMC	Sabang Merauke Raya Air Charter	SAMER	Indonesia	Defunct; Ceased operations in 2011
	SMD	Servicios Aéreos La Marquesa	SERVICIOS MARQUESA	Mexico	
8D		Servant Air		United States	
	SME	Semos	SEMICH	Kazakhstan	
	SMF	Smalandsflyg	GORDON	Sweden	
	SMH	Smithair	SMITHAIR	United States	
E8	SMK	Semeyavia	ERTIS	Kazakhstan	Defunct; Ceased operations in July 2013
	SML	Smith Air (1976)	SMITH AIR	Canada	
	SMQ	Samar Air	SAMAR AIR	Tajikistan	
	SMR	Somon Air	SOMON AIR	Tajikistan	
	SMT	Skyline	SKYLIMIT	Nigeria	
	AOS	Servicios Aéreos Del Sol, S.A. de C.V.	AEROSOL	Mexico	
	SNA	Senator Aviation Charter	SENATOR	Germany	
NB	SNB	Sterling Airlines	STERLING	Denmark	Defunct; Ceased operations on 29 October 2008
	SNE	Servicios Aéreos De Nicaragua (SANSA)	SANSA	Nicaragua	
	SNF	Shans Air	SHANS AIR	Russia	
	SNH	Senair Services	SENSERVICE	Senegal	
	SNI	Savanah Airlines	SAVANAHLINE	Nigeria	Defunct; Prohibited from operating in 2007
6J	SNJ	Solaseed Air	NEWSKY	Japan	
SL	SNK	Southeast Airlines (Sun Jet International)	SUN KING	United States	Defunct; Ceased operations on 30 November 2004
	SNL	Soonair Lines	SOONAIR	United States	
	SNM	Servizi Aerei	SERVIZI AEREI	Italy	
	SNP	Sun Pacific International	SUN PACIFIC	United States	
	SNQ	Sun Quest Executive Air Charter	EXECU-QUEST	United States	
	SNS	Societe Centrafricaine De Transport Aerien		Central African Republic	
	SNT	Suncoast Aviation	SUNCOAST	United States	
	SNU	Snunit Aviation		Israel	
	SNV	Sudanese States Aviation	SUDANESE	Sudan	
	SNW	Sun West Airlines	SUN WEST	United States	
	SNX	Sun Air Aviation Services	SUNEX	Canada	
	SOB	Stabo Freight	STABO	Zambia	
	SOC	Southern Cargo Air Lines		Russia	
	SOH	Southern Ohio Aviation Sales	SOUTHERN OHIO	United States	
	SOI	Southern Aviation	SOAVAIR	Zambia	
IE	SOL	Solomon Airlines	SOLOMON	Solomon Islands	
	SOM	Somali Airlines	SOMALAIR	Somali Republic	
	SON	Sunshine Air Tours	SUNSHINE TOURS	United States	
	SOO	Southern Air	SOUTHERN AIR	United States	Defunct; Purchased by Atlas Air in 2016 and fully integrated on 17 November 2021
ZS	SOP	Solinair	SOLINAIR	Slovenia	
	SOR	Sonair Servico Aéreo	SONAIR	Angola	
	SOT	Southeast Correct Craft	SOUTH COURIER	United States	
9X	SOU	Southern Airways	SOUTHERN EXPRESS	United States	
6W	SOV	Saratov Airlines Joint Stock Company	SARATOV AIR	Russia	
	SOW	Sowind Air	SOWIND	Canada	Defunct - code reallocated
	SOW	White Sparrow GmbH	SPARROW	Austria	
	SOX	Solid Air	SOLIDAIR	Netherlands	
HZ	SOZ	Sat Airlines	SATCO	Kazakhstan	
	SPA	Sierra Pacific Airlines	SIERRA PACIFIC	United States	
	SPB	Springbok Classic Air	SPRING CLASSIC	South Africa	
	SPC	Spark Air Cargo	Spark Cargo	United States	
	SPE	Sprague Electric Company	SPRAGUE	United States	
	SPF	Space World Airline	SPACE WORLD	Nigeria	
	SPG	Springdale Air Service	SPRING AIR	United States	
	SPH	Sapphire Executive Air	SAPPHIRE-CHARTER	South Africa	
HK	SPI	South Pacific Island Airways	SOUTH PACIFIC	United States	Defunct; Ceased operations in 1987
	SPK	Spark Airlines	SPARK	United States	
	SPL	Servicios Corporativos Aéreos De La Laguna	CORPORATIVOS LAGUNA	Mexico	
	SPN	Skorpion Air	AIR SKORPIO	Bulgaria	
	SPP	Sapphire Aviation	SAPPHIRE	United States	
	SPQ	Servicios Aéreos Palenque	SERVICOS PALENQUE	Mexico	
	TBS	Servicios Aéreos Tribasa	TRIBASA	Mexico	
S5	TCF	Shuttle America	MERCURY	United States	Defunct; Merged into Republic Airways on 31 January 2017
	SVV	SALTAVIATION	SALT	Poland	
	TGT	SAAB Nyge Aero	TARGET	Sweden	
	THB	Spark Air	THAI SABAI	Thailand	
	TIH	S C Ion Tiriac	TIRIAC AIR	Romania	
	TRL	Starlite Aviation	STARSTREAM	South Africa	
	TRN	Servicios Aéreos Corporativos	AEROTRON	Mauritania	
	TTM	Societe Tout Transport Mauritanien	TOUT-AIR	Mauritania	
	TZU	Servicios Aéreos Tamazula	TAMAZULA	Mexico	
	UGP	Shar Ink	SHARINK	Russia	Defunct; Ceased operations in 2019
	UKU	Second Sverdlovsk Air Enterprise	PYSHMA	Russia	
	UNT	Servicios Aéreos Universitarios	UNIVERSITARIO	Mexico	
	USK	Skif-Air	SKIF-AIR	Ukraine	
	USN	Smarkand Aero Servise	SAMAS	Uzbekistan	
C7	UZS	Samarkand Airways	SOGDIANA	Uzbekistan	
	VDO	Servicios Aéreos Avandaro	AVANDARO	Mexico	
	VGS	Stichting Vliegschool 16Hoven	SMART	Netherlands	
	VRB	Silverback Cargo Freighters	SILVERBACK	Rwanda	
	VRS	Sirvair	VAIRSA	Mexico	
DV	VSV	SCAT Airlines	VLASTA	Kazakhstan	
	VXN	Sunset Aviation	VIXEN	United States	
	TWY	Sunset Aviation, LLC	TWILIGHT	United States	dba Solairus Aviation
	WCC	Sport Air Travel	WEST COAST	United States	
	WFC	Swift Copters	SWIFTCOPTERS	Switzerland	
	WLK	Skyrover CC	SKYWATCH	South Africa	
F2	XLK	Safarilink Aviation	SAFARILINK	Kenya	
	XMX	SENEAM	SENEAM	Mexico	
	XPG	Southport Air Service		United States	
	XSA	Spectrum Air Service		United States	
	XSN	Stephenville Aviation Services		Canada	
	XTA	Servicios Aéreos Textra	TEXTRA	Mexico	
	XTR	Sector Airlines	EXTER	Canada	
	XXS	Skyplan Services		Canada	
	YBE	Stewart Aviation Services	YELLOW BIRD	United States	
R1		Sirin			
	SXN	SaxonAir	SAXONAIR	United Kingdom	
O3	CSS	SF Airlines	SHUN FENG	China	
	SAF	Singapore Air Force	SINGA	Singapore	
	KFE	SkyFirst LTD	SKYFIRST	Malta	2012
PQ	SQP	SkyUp	SKYUP	Ukraine	
U5		SkyUp MT		Malta	
S5	LLC	Small Planet Airlines	SMALL PLANET	Lithuania	defunct
P7	LLP	Small Planet Airlines	SKYPOL	Poland	defunct
P2	LLI	Small Planet Airlines	AURIGA	Italy	defunct
5P	LLX	Small Planet Airlines	GERMANJET	Germany	defunct
UL	ALK	SriLankan Airlines	SRILANKAN	Sri Lanka	
DJ	SRR	Star Air	WHITESTAR	Denmark	
V9	HCW	Star1 Airlines	STAR1	Lithuania	defunct
Q4	TLK	Starlink Aviation	STARLINK	Canada	
	UFA	State Flight Academy of Ukraine	FLIGHT ACADEMY	Ukraine	
9G	SPQ	Sun PhuQuoc Airways	SUN LUX	Vietnam	
	CDL	Sunbird Airlines	CAROLINA	United States	
XG	SXD	Sunexpress Deutschland	SUNRISE	Germany	
SO	AAS	Sunshine Airlines			defunct
	RZ	Superna Airlines	YANGTZE RIVER	China	

== IATA Traffic Conference Areas ==
The International Air Transport Association (IATA) divides the world into three areas called the Traffic Conference Areas (TCAs) for air travel purposes. These areas are used to define geographical boundaries for fare construction and other industry-related practices:

- Traffic Conference Area 1 (TC1) – this area includes the Americas, encompassing North America (the Caribbean, Central America, and Northern America) and South America.
- Traffic Conference Area 2 (TC2) – this area includes the EMEA region, encompassing Europe, the Middle East, and Africa (North Africa and Sub-Saharan Africa).
- Traffic Conference Area 3 (TC3) – this area includes the Asia–Pacific region, encompassing the rest of Asia (Central Asia, East Asia, North Asia, South Asia, and Southeast Asia) and Oceania.

Essentially, TC1 covers the "New World", while TC2 and TC3 together cover the "Old World" (Africa-Eurasia) and the "Land Down Under".

== See also ==
- IATA airport code
- ICAO airport code
