= Sky Aviation =

Sky Aviation may refer to:

- Sky Aviation (Indonesia), a regional airline based in Indonesia
- Sky Aviation (Sierra Leone), an airline based in Sierra Leone
- Sky Aviation Leasing International, an aviation leasing company that was acquired by Goshawk Aviation
