= CBO =

CBO may stand for:

- Chief business officer, the top operating strategy executive of a commercial company, or academic/research institution
- Chief brand officer, another title for the Chief marketing officer
- CBO-FM, a CBC Radio One station in Ottawa, Ontario, Canada
- Central Bank of Oman, established in December 1974 and began operations on 1 April 1975
- Combined Bomber Offensive, an Anglo-American offensive of strategic bombing during World War II in Europe
- Community-based organization
- Congressional Budget Office, United States federal agency responsible for government budget calculations and analyses
- Cotabato Airport's IATA code
- Criminal behaviour order, a court order issued in England and Wales designed to change the behaviour of convicts
- Central Boycott Office, an agency facilitating the Arab League boycott of Israel
- City of Birmingham Orchestra, the original name of the City of Birmingham Symphony Orchestra
- Collateralized bond obligation, a type of collateralized debt obligation
- Columbium oxide (CbO), an alternate name for niobium oxide
- Cheddar Bacon Onion sandwich or Angus, a McDonald's product

== See also ==
- C-Bo (born 1974), American rapper
- SVO (disambiguation)
