= SVO =

SVO may refer to:

- Association football clubs in Germany:
  - SVO Germaringen
  - SV Oberachern
- Silver vanadium oxide battery (SVO battery)
- San Jose Chamber of Commerce, a chamber of commerce in San Jose, California, United States, known as the Silicon Valley Organization (SVO) from 2017–2021
- Saturn Valley Online, an EarthBound MMORPG
- SVO, save opportunity in baseball statistics
- Sheremetyevo International Airport, of three major airports serving Moscow, Russia (IATA Airport Code: SVO)
- Servicios Aeronáuticos de Oriente, former Mexican charter airline (ICAO code: SVO)
- Small Veblen ordinal, a large countable ordinal
- Social value orientations, a psychological construct
- Sparse voxel octree, an algorithm for computer graphics rendering
- Special Vehicle Operations, a subsidiary of Ford Motor Company
  - Ford Mustang SVO, a car developed by Ford's SVO USA
  - EA Falcon SVO, a sedan by Ford's SVO Australia
- Special military operation (Russian: специальная военная операция, romanized: spetsial'naya voyennaya operatsiya), a euphemism for the Russian invasion of Ukraine
- Straight vegetable oil, vegetable oil used as fuel
- Subject–Verb–Object in linguistic typology
