= Seulawah Nad Air =

Seulawah NAD Air
IATA	ICAO	Call sign
-	NAD	Seulawah
- Commenced operations: 2002
- Ceased operations: 2003
- Fleet size: See Fleet below
- Headquarters: Central Jakarta, Java, Indonesia

Seulawah NAD Air was an airline based in Central Jakarta, Indonesia. It operated domestic and international services.

The Transportation Ministry delayed license revocation of 11 idle airlines, including Seulawah NAD Air, in February 2007 to give the operators an opportunity to restructure. The airline has re-applied for licences.

== Code data ==
- ICAO Code: NAD
- Callsign: Seulawah

== History ==
The airline was launched in September 2002, but suspended its services on 21 March 2003, with no clarity about when it might recommence.

In 2005 an investor was prepared to pay Seulawah NAD Air's debts, which were owned by the Nanggroe Aceh Darussalam (NAD) provincial administration, and revive its operations. Pending the signing of a memorandum of understanding most of the airline's debts would be paid and it could commence operations under new management. Under the old management, the airline suffered heavy losses and was eventually unable to operate its two Boeing 737-200 aircraft.

== Services ==
As of January 2005 Seulawah Nad Air operated services linking Banda Aceh with Medan and Jakarta and Penang in Malaysia.

== Fleet ==
As of January 2005 the Seulawah Nad Air fleet includes:

- 1 Boeing 737-200
