= SeaCoast Airlines =

Airline of the United States

| IATA | ICAO | Call sign |
|---|---|---|
| — | SCC | Sea-Coaster |
- Founded: 2002; 24 years ago
- Ceased operations: 2012; 14 years ago
- Focus cities: Key West & Marathon, Florida
- Fleet size: 25
- Destinations: 10
- Parent company: None
- Headquarters: Clearwater, Florida
- Key people: Mark Beynart, Owner and Founder

SeaCoast Airlines was an airline headquartered in its private terminal on the grounds of St. Petersburg-Clearwater International Airport in unincorporated Pinellas County, Florida, near Clearwater. It operated from 2002 to 2015.

== History ==
The airline began aircraft charter service on July 4, 2002, to Key West and Marathon from St. Petersburg-Clearwater International Airport. Their fleet consisted of 15 twin-engine Navajo Chieftains which hold 9 passengers each. They provided charter service throughout Florida and other Southern States 24 hours a day, 7 days a week.

On Wednesday, December 5, 2015, the airline announced it was going out of business, effective immediately. This announcement followed closely by an announcement by Southwest Airlines that it was beginning regular service between Tampa and Key West.

== Fleet ==
2 - Piper PA-31 Navajo

== See also ==
- List of defunct airlines of the United States
