= Sunwest Aviation =

Canadian charter airline

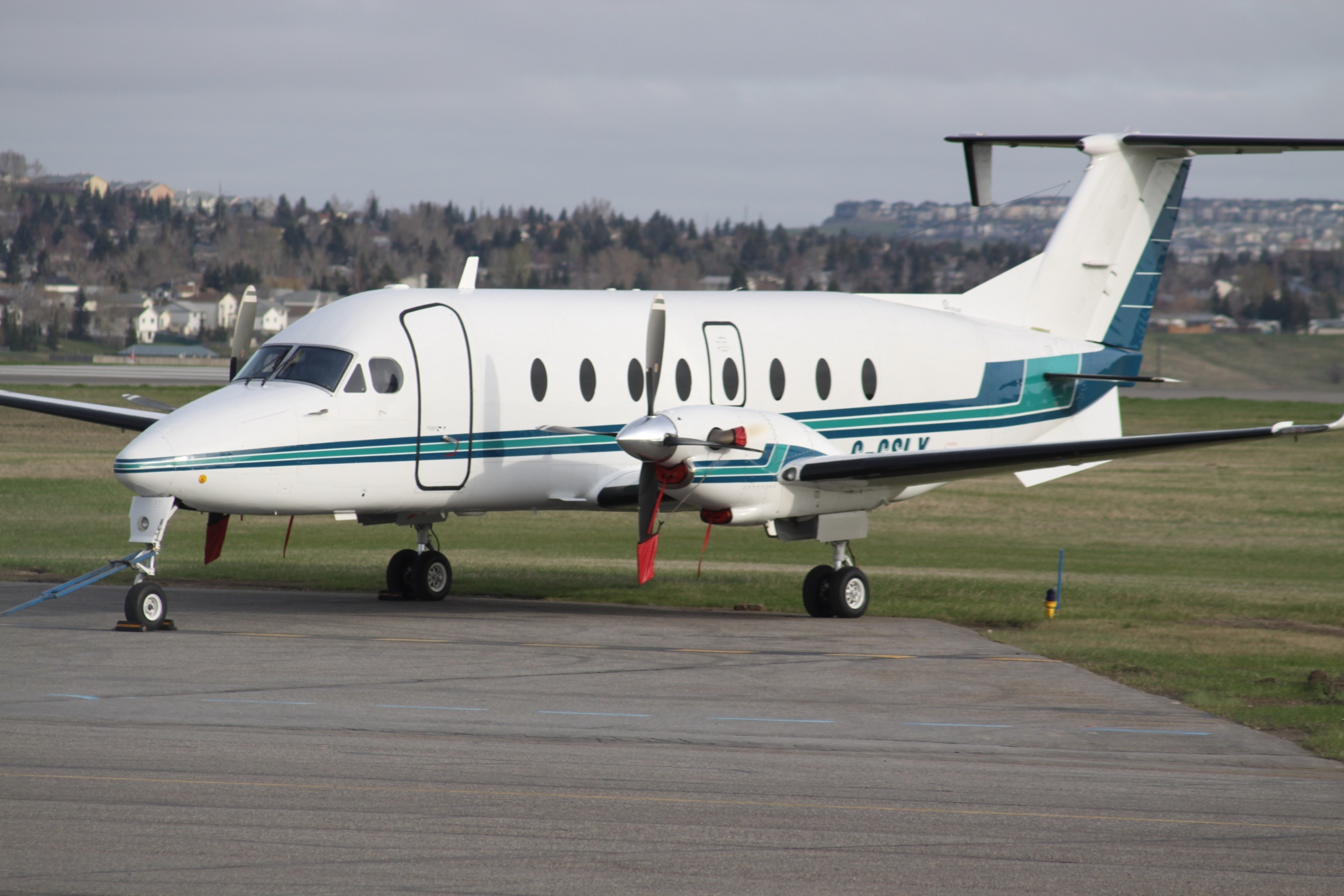
- Sunwest Aviation Beechcraft 1900
IATA	ICAO	Call sign
-	CNK	CHINOOK
- AOC #: Canada: 5404; United States: UNWF287F
- Hubs: Calgary International Airport, Toronto Pearson International Airport
- Secondary hubs: Edmonton International Airport, Winnipeg James Armstrong Richardson International Airport
- Frequent-flyer program: Avro Club Membership
- Fleet size: 24
- Parent company: Sunwest Aviation Ltd.
- Headquarters: Calgary, Alberta, Canada
- Website: https://www.sunwestaviation.ca/

Sunwest Aviation is a Canadian aviation services company specializing in aircraft management and charter operations across Canada, with fixed-base operator (FBO) services at the Calgary International Airport in Calgary, Alberta, Canada.

== History ==
Sunwest Aviation was established in 1986 as Sunwest Home Aviation and adopted its current name in 2006.

On 1 October 2014, Sunwest took over the operations of Alta Flights.

Sunwest also operates a medical evacuation program, known at Halo Medevac, transporting patients locally and internationally following a medical emergency. Along with Cenovus Energy they operated the now closed Axe Lake Aerodrome.

On 15 December 2018, Sunwest Aviation entered the fixed-base operator (FBO) business and became the official Shell AeroCentre in Calgary. In addition to being the newest FBO in Calgary, Sunwest continues to provide aircraft charter, and aircraft management for aircraft owners.

Sunwest Aviation later expanded its eastern Canadian presence through the acquisition of Jet-Share Canada in February of 2025, extending its aircraft management and charter operations to the Toronto market.

The company provides air ambulance, Sunwest AeroMedical, and medical repatriation services in addition to participating in HOPE (Human Organ Procurement and Exchange Program) by providing aero-medical services that allow for the time sensitive transportation of lifesaving organs.

== Fleet ==
=== Current fleet ===
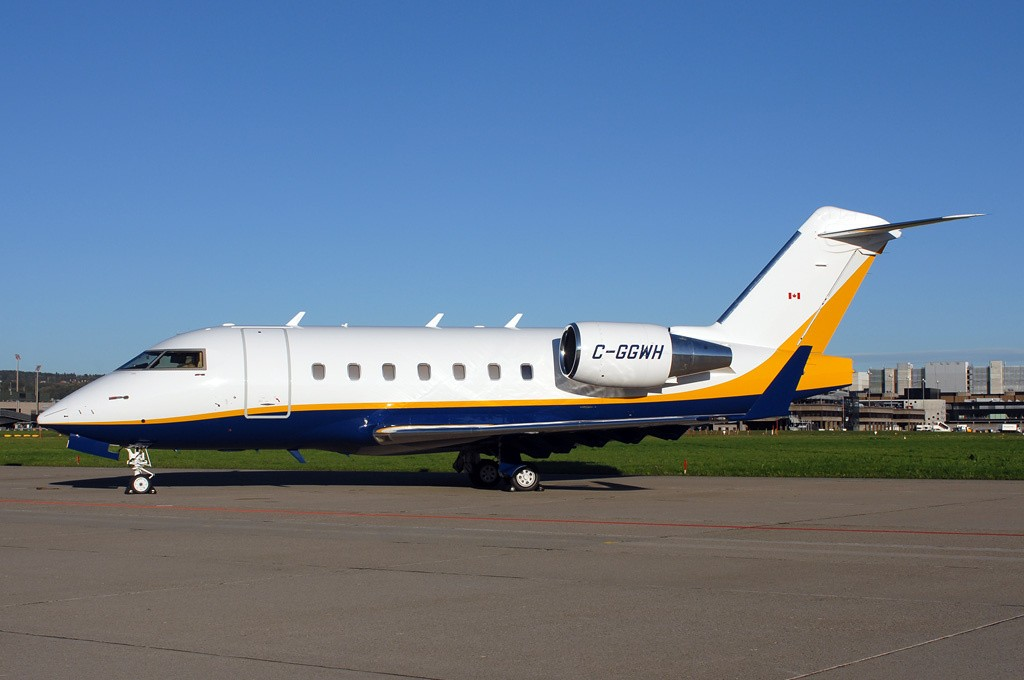
Former Sunwest Aviation Bombardier Challenger 600 series

As of 2 May 2026, Transport Canada lists the following 24 aircraft as being in the Sunwest Fleet:

Sunwest Aviation fleet
Aircraft	No. of aircraft	Variants	Notes
Beechcraft 1900	5	1900D	Turboprop, 18 / 19 passengers
Beechcraft Super King Air	2	1 - Super King Air 200; 1 - Super King Air 300	Turboprop, 9 passengers in the 200 and 8 in the 300 which is listed by Sunwest as a B350
Bombardier Challenger 300	4	Challenger 300; Challenger 3500	Jet, 8 passengers
Bombardier Challenger 600 series	2	CL-604	Jet, 11 / 12 passengers and listed at Sunwest as CL-604 and CL-605
Cessna Citation Excel	1	560XL	Jet, not listed at Sunwest
de Havilland Canada Dash 8	3	1 - DHC-8-202; 1 - DHC-8-314; 1 - DHC-8-315	Turboprop, 37, 52 or 56 passengers
Gulfstream G150	2	G150	Jet, 7 passengers
Gulfstream G650	1	G650ER	Jet, 15 passengers
Learjet 45	3		Jet, 8 passengers
Piper PA-31 Navajo	1	PA-31-350 Chieftain	Turboprop, not listed at Sunwest
Total	24		

=== Historical fleet ===
Over the years Sunwest has flown over 300 aircraft. In addition to other aircraft of the types listed above Sunwest has previously flown the following:

- Beechcraft King Air
- Beechcraft Model 18 (Beech 3NM)
- Boeing B75N1
- British Aerospace 125
- Cessna 208 Caravan
- Cessna 425
- Cessna 441 Conquest II
- Cessna Citation II (Cessna 550)
- Cessna Citation V (Cessna 560)
- Gulfstream G550 (Gulfstream GV-SP)
- Dassault Falcon 7X
- Hawker 800 (Raytheon Hawker 800XP)
- Learjet 35
- Learjet 55
- Fairchild Swearingen Metroliner (SA226-TC, SA227-DC)

== Certifications and awards ==
Sunwest Aviation holds multiple industry-recognized safety and quality accreditations. The company is a Transport Canada-approved aircraft operator, demonstrating compliance with national regulatory standards for commercial aviation operations. It also maintains a platinum rating from ARGUS International, a provider of global due-diligence assessments for charter operators, and has achieved IS-BAO Stage 3 certification under the International Standard for Business Aircraft Operations, reflecting the highest level of safety management practices.

Sunwest's aeromedical division has been accredited by the European Aero-Medical Institute (EURAMI) for both regional and long-range fixed wing air ambulance operations with an adult critical care endorsement.

In fixed-base operator (FBO) services, Sunwest has been repeatedly recognized in industry surveys. After launching its FBO business line in 2018 as the official Shell AeroCentre at Calgary International Airport, the company was awarded the Rising Star Award by Wings in 2019. It was later voted Western Canada’s Top FBO in the Wings magazine FBO survey in 2021 and 2022, and has continued to be ranked among Western Canada’s best FBOs into 2025.
