= Swazi Express Airways =

Airline based in Swaziland

IATA	ICAO	Call sign
Q4	SWX	SWAZI EXPRESS
- Founded: 1995
- Ceased operations: April 2008
- Hubs: Matsapha Airport (Swaziland)
- Fleet size: 2
- Destinations: 5
- Headquarters: Matsapha, Swaziland
- Key people: Hans Steffen (CEO)

Swazi Express Airways was an airline based in Swaziland and owned by Steffen Air Charter Services.

== History ==
The airline was established in 1995. It was then called Steffen Air, and later changed to Swazi Express Airways. The airline started operations in 1995 with a Cessna 210 (5 seater aircraft) with flights covering the following destinations: Matsapha (Swaziland), Maputo (Mozambique), and Vilanculos (Mozambique). In 1998 the Cessna 210 was upgraded to Cessna Caravan, (11 seater) and a new destination was added: Durban (South Africa). In 2002 the Cessna Caravan was upgraded to a Metro III, 19 seater.

Swazi Express ceased flight operations on 4 April 2008.

== Former destinations ==
- Swaziland (Matsapha Airport) - hub
- Maputo, Mozambique (Maputo International Airport)
- Vilanculos, Mozambique
- Durban, South Africa
- Johannesburg, South Africa

== Cargo services ==
Type of cargo: parcels, express documents and mail.

Services available on routes:

- Durban (South Africa)
- Maputo International Airport - Maputo (Mozambique)
- Matsapha Airport (Swaziland) (hub)
- Vilanculos (Mozambique)
