= Sibia (airline) =

Russian airline

"Aircompany "SIBIA" ltd ООО «Авиакомпания «СИБИА»
IATA	ICAO	Call sign
—	SBD	SIBIA
- Founded: 1991
- Hubs: Kurgan
- Headquarters: Kurgan, Kurgan Oblast, Russia
- Key people: Gennady M. Shironosov (CEO)
- Website: http://sibia.ucoz.ru/

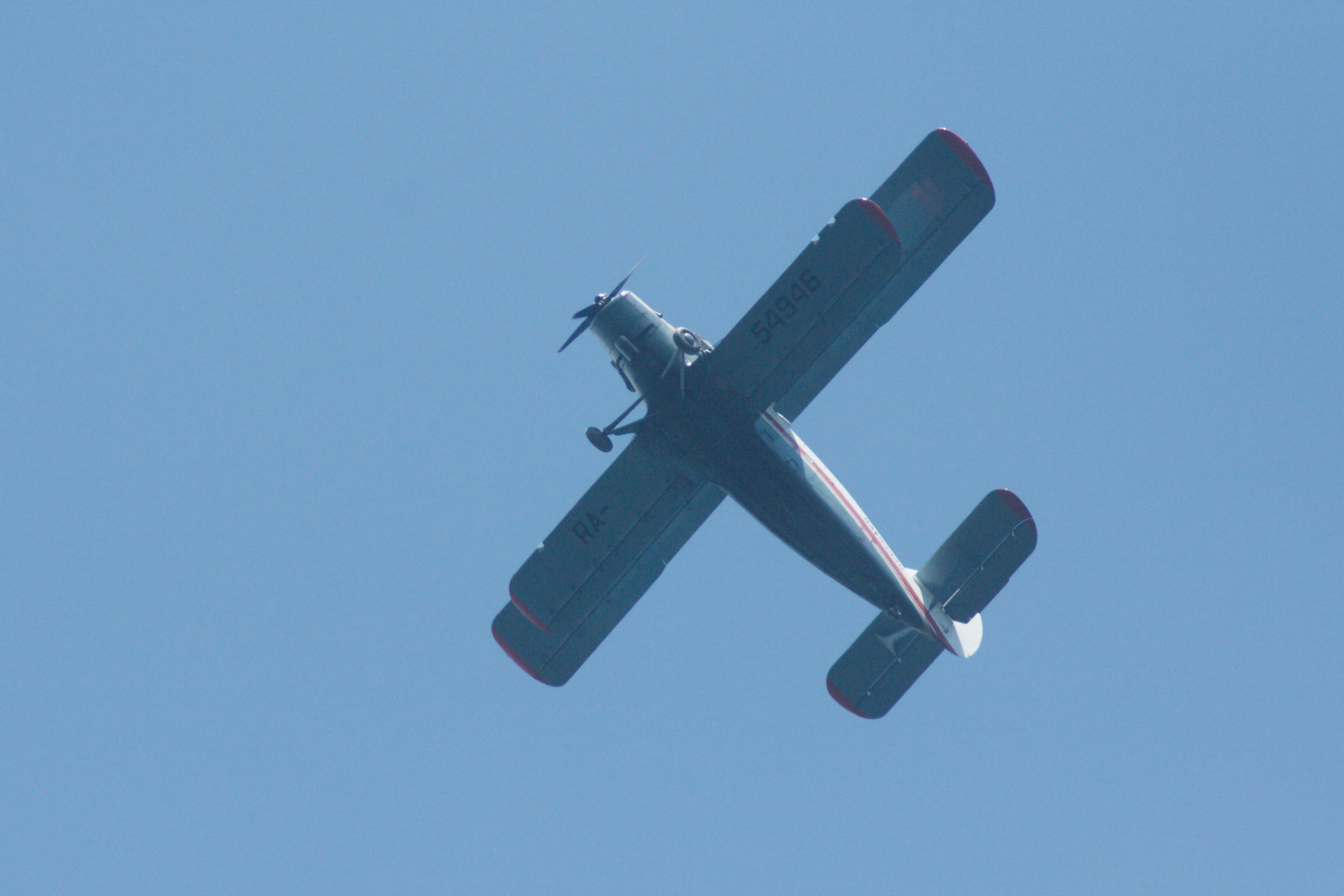
Antonov An-2 RA-54946

"Aircompany "SIBIA" ltd (Общество с ограниченной ответственностью «Авиакомпания «СИБИА», Obçestvo s ograničennoj otvetstvennostjju «Aviakompanija») is a Russian airline specialising in various forms of aerial work including crop-spraying, medical flights and search-and-rescue. It also provided charter passenger services. In 2007 it was taken over by ChelAvia who mainly deal with airline training/teaching and aircraft sales but who also provide aerial work themselves.

== Fleet ==
Aircraft type	Active (February 2013)	Notes
Antonov An-2	7	
Tecnam P2006T	1	with 2012

== Incidents ==
On June 1, 2002, the CEO personally vowed to investigate an incident where youths came across and hijacked an Antonov An-2 about to take off in Nagaybaksky District (Chelyabinsk Oblast); they flew it over the town for a while. They were apprehended on landing and later charged.
