= Servicios Aéreos de los Andes =

Peruvian airline

IATA	ICAO	Call sign
—	AND	SERVI ANDES
- Founded: 2014
- Hubs: Jorge Chávez International Airport
- Fleet size: 5
- Headquarters: Lima, Peru
- Website: Official website

Servicios Aéreos de los Andes is a Peruvian airline that operates both fixed-wing aircraft and rotorcraft. Founded as a charter airline in 2005, the company specializes in transporting personnel for the mining and oil and gas industries. In 2014 the airline began offering commercial service with flights between Lima and Jauja and Cusco.

In 2012, two of the company's helicopters were destroyed in an attack by the Sendero Luminoso at the Camisea Gas Project in Peru.

== Fleet ==
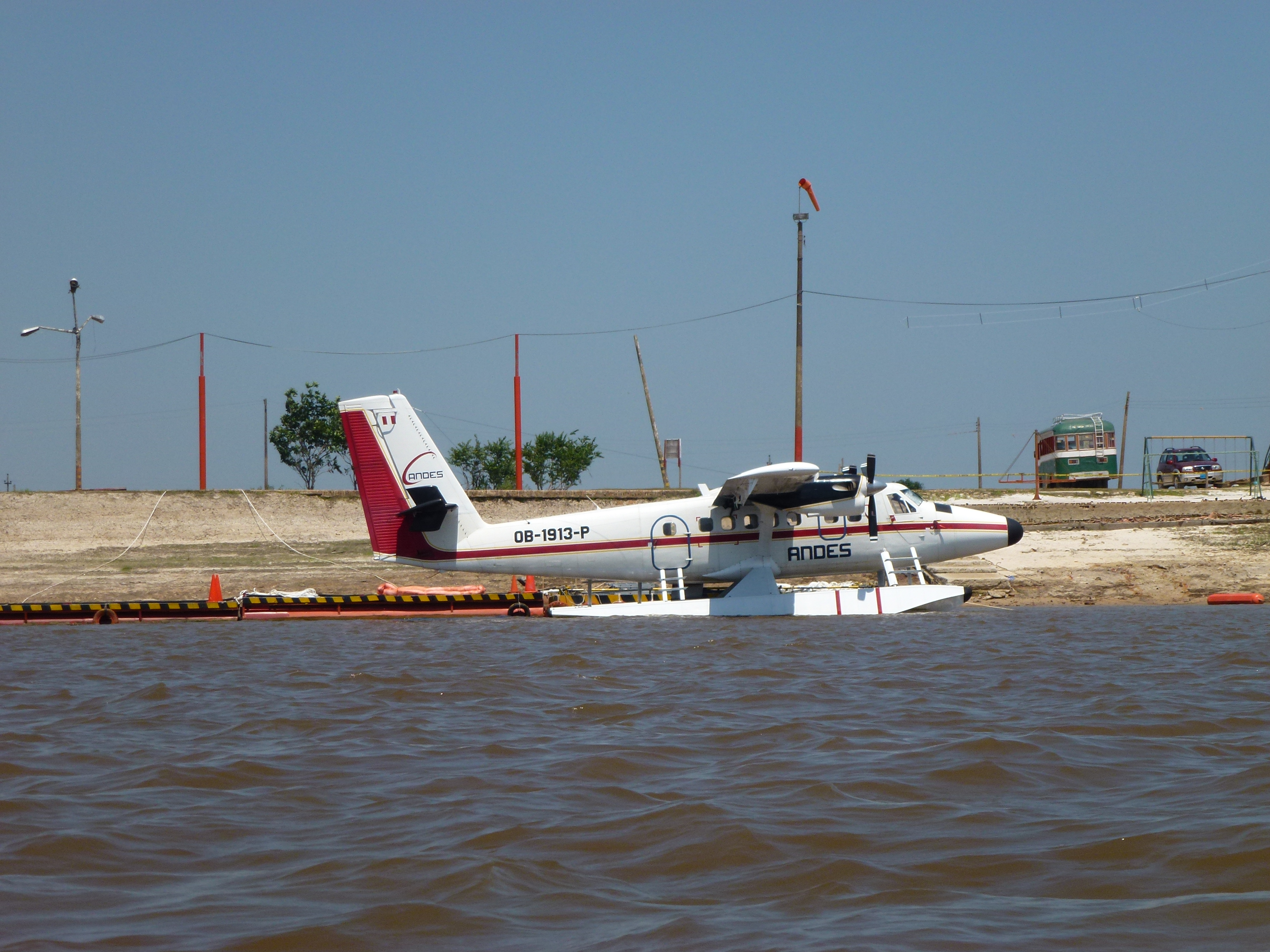
DHC-6 Twin Otter at Iquitos

The Servicios Aéreos de los Andes fleet consists of the following aircraft (as of September 2020):

Aircraft	In service	Orders	Passengers	Notes
De Havilland Canada DHC-6-300 Twin Otter	1	—	20	
British Aerospace Jetstream Super	3	—	19	
British Aerospace Jeatstream 31	1	—	12	
Total	5			

Other aircraft operated by the airline include the following helicopters:

- 2 Eurocopter AS332 Super Puma
- 3 Eurocopter AS350 Écureuil
- Bell 412
- Bell 205
- Bell 212
