= Skystar International =

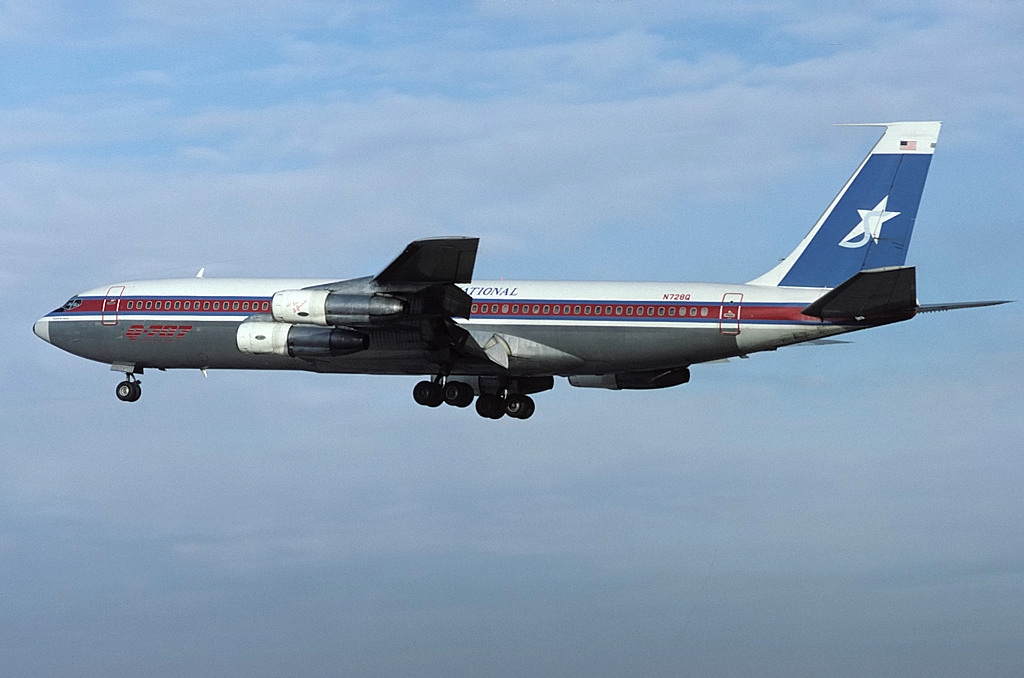
IATA	ICAO	Call sign
7S	SSK	Unknown
- Ceased operations: 1987
- Fleet size: 2

Skystar International was an American charter airline formed by Nuno Berg. Its flights consisted of charters for the Blue Army of Our Lady of Fátima, from the US to Ireland. Flights began with a single Boeing 707 from the airline Pan Am, and a second plane was added later.

In 1986 the airline and Blue Army applied to the Irish government for permission from to fly in summer 1987 from Knock Airport direct to the US, without a stopover at Shannon Airport, the main transatlantic airport to the US. The airline planned to transport American Catholic pilgrims returning from pilgrimages to Europe, via a stopover at Knock Shrine. The then Minister for Communications, Jim Mitchell opposed the application. After Skystar ceased trading in 1987, permission was granted for transatlantic flights from Knock under the Open Skies Agreement between the European Union and the US.
