= Sundt Air =

Norwegian aircraft operator

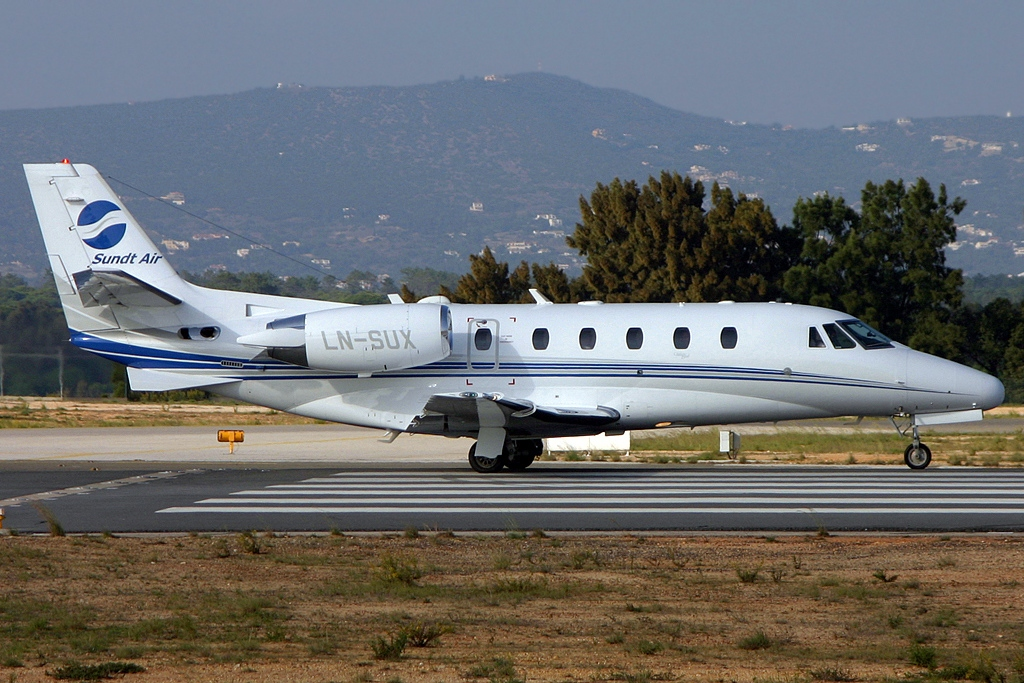
- Cessna 560XL Citation Excel, Sundt Air
IATA	ICAO	Call sign
-	MDT	MIDNIGHT
- Founded: 1997
- Fleet size: 6
- Headquarters: Oslo, Norway
- Key people: Christian and Helene Sundt
- Website: www.sundtair.com

Sundt Air is a Norwegian operator of corporate jets based in Oslo. It has four aircraft used for corporate and private charter. Two Beechcraft Super King Airs are used to carry out flight inspection duties as well as charters.

== Fleet ==
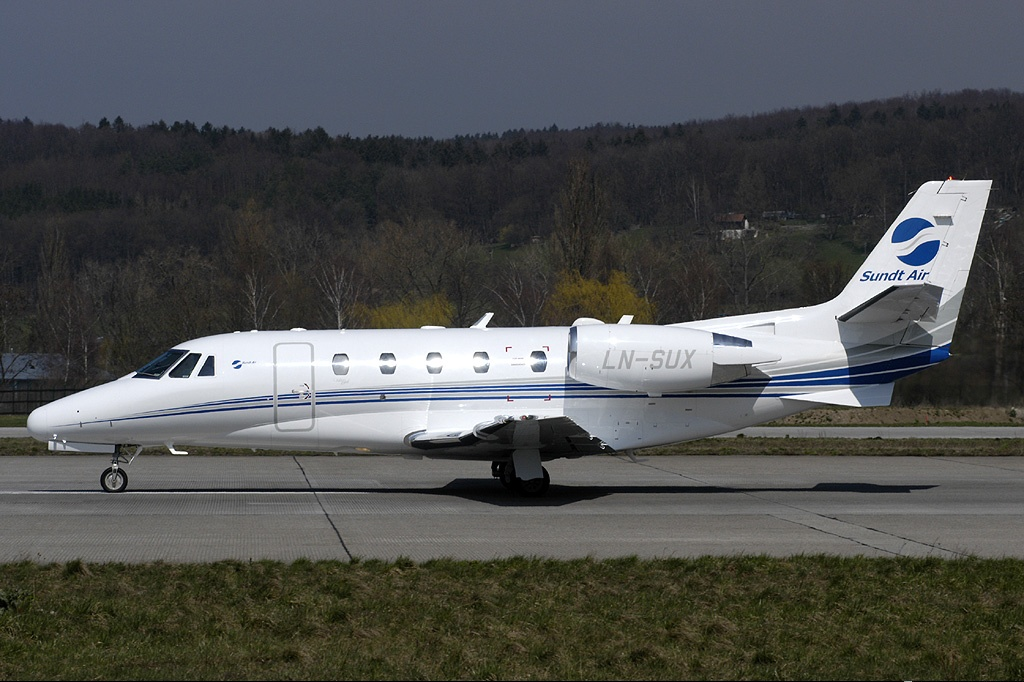
Sundt Air Cessna Citation Excel

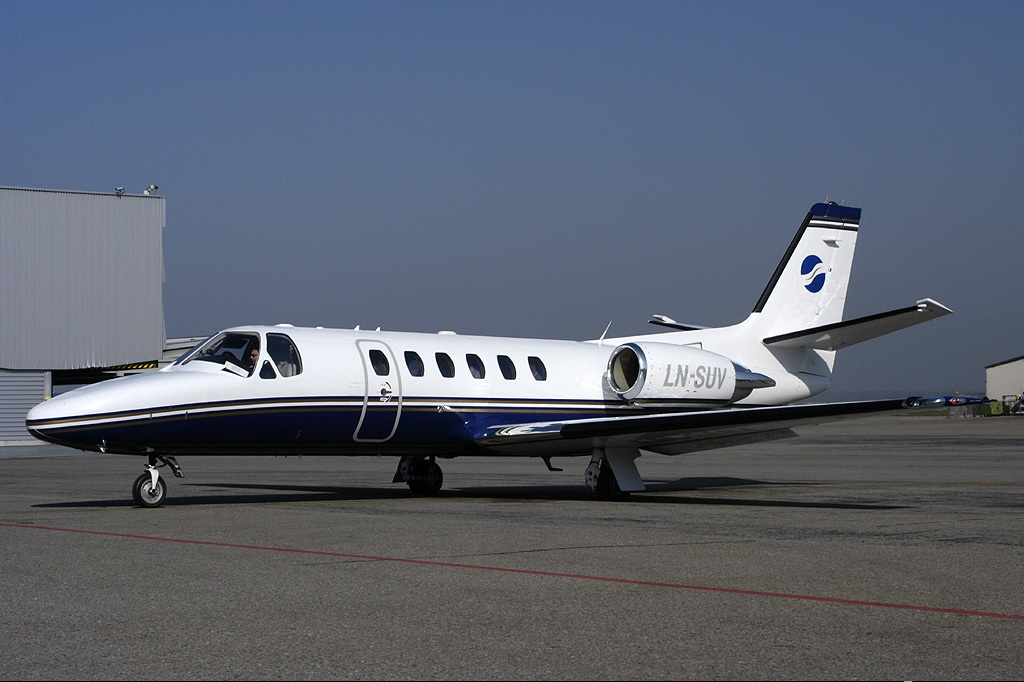
Sundt Air Cessna Citation Bravo

The Sundt Air fleet is:

- 1 x Beechcraft B350ER (maritime patrol)
- 2 × Beechcraft Super King Air 200 (charter and flight inspection duties)
- 1 × Bombardier Challenger 604
- 1 × Bombardier Challenger 350
- 1 × Cessna Citation Sovereign
