= Star Air (Indonesia) =

Airline of Indonesia

| IATA | ICAO | Call sign |
|---|---|---|
| 5H | STQ | STAR |
- Founded: 2000
- Commenced operations: 2001
- Ceased operations: 2005
- Hubs: Soekarno-Hatta International Airport
- Secondary hubs: Ngurah Rai International Airport
- Focus cities: Juanda International Airport
- Fleet size: 5
- Destinations: 9
- Headquarters: Jakarta, Indonesia
- Key people: Ale Sugiarto (CEO)

Star Air was an Indonesian airline based in Jakarta.

== History ==
The airline was established in 2000, a period in which private companies sprang up in Indonesia after the government announced the deregulation of airlines in the country. It commenced operations on the 18th of July, 2001, flying from Jakarta to Surabaya and Makassar. However, like some other Indonesian airlines (a total of 11 airlines), Star Air's license was revoked by the government in 2008 due to inactivity.

== Destinations ==
Indonesia

- Java and Lesser Sunda Islands
  - Bali - Ngurah Rai International Airport (Secondary Hub)
  - Jakarta - Soekarno-Hatta International Airport (Hub)
  - Kupang - El Tari Airport
  - Surabaya - Juanda International Airport (Focus City)
- Kalimantan
  - Balikpapan - Sultan Aji Muhammad Sulaiman Airport
- Sumatra
  - Medan - Polonia Airport
  - Pekanbaru - Sultan Syarif Kasim II International Airport
- Sulawesi
  - Manado - Sam Ratulangi Airport

Malaysia

- Kuala Lumpur - Kuala Lumpur International Airport

== Fleet ==
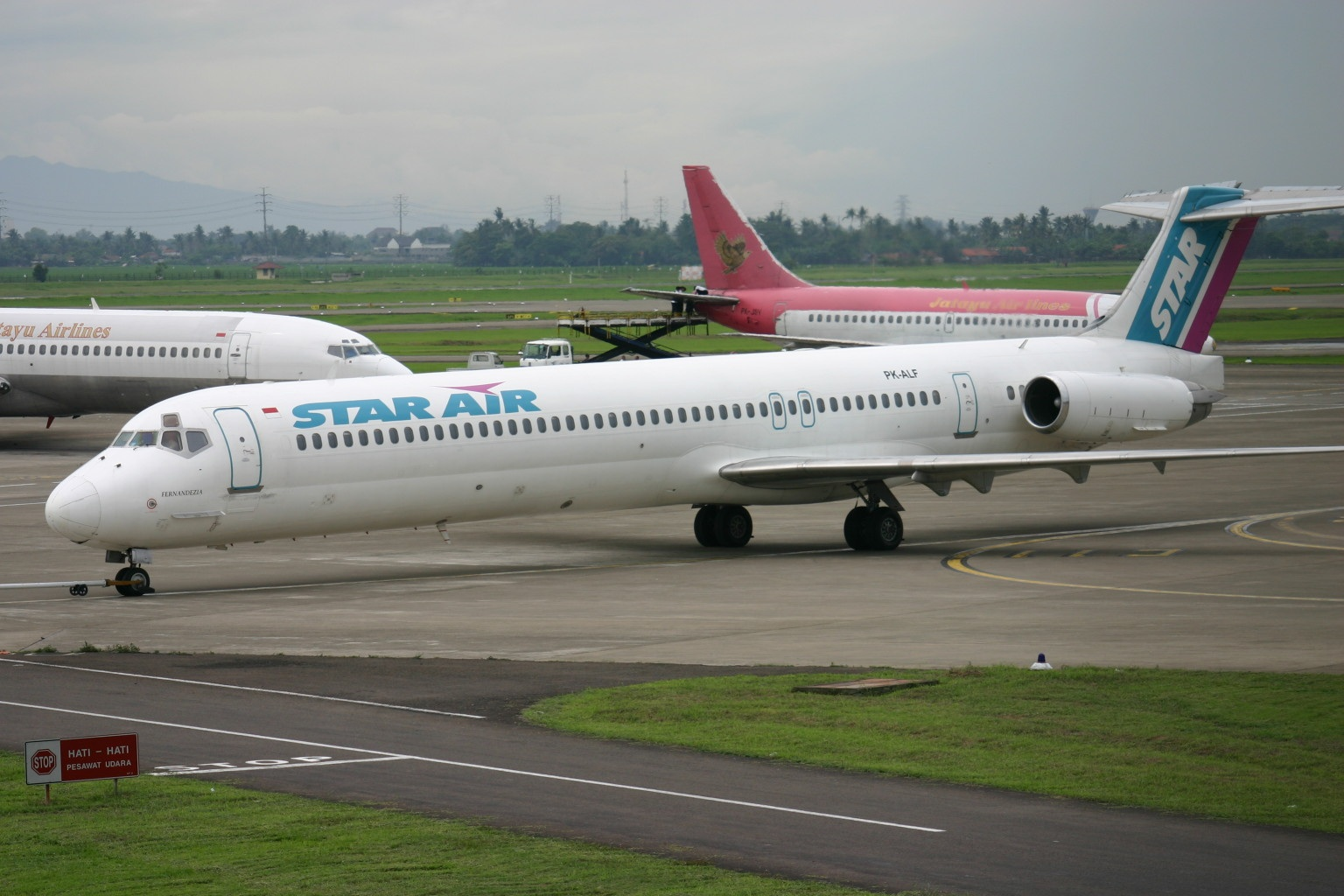
Star Air McDonnell Douglas MD-83

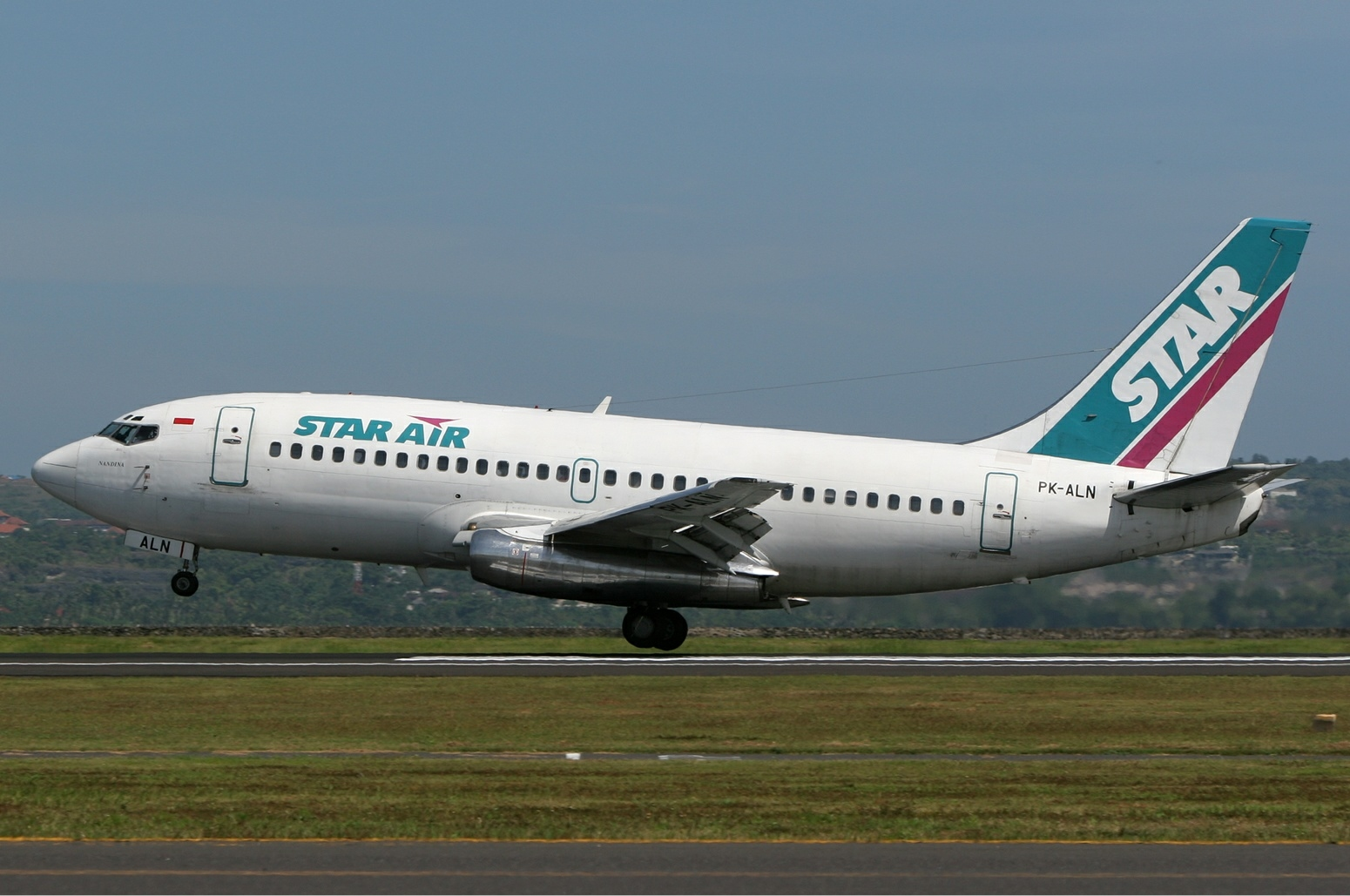
Star Air Boeing 737-200

The Star Air fleet consisted of the following aircraft:

- 5 Boeing 737-200
- 2 McDonnell Douglas MD-82
- 2 McDonnell Douglas MD-83

== Accidents and incidents ==
- On January 23, 2003, A Star Air Boeing 737 touched down 500m past the Soekarno-Hatta International Airport's runway 25L threshold, a little left of the centreline, in an area of heavy rainfall with associated heavy winds. It went off the side of the runway, causing substantial damage to the undercarriage and belly.
