= Savanah Airlines =

Airline in Nigeria

IATA	ICAO	Call sign
-	SNI	Savanahline
- Fleet size: Included BAC One-Eleven
- Headquarters: Nigeria

Savanah Airlines was an airline based in Nigeria.

== History ==
On March 27, 2002 one of the airline's BAC One-Elevens was damaged beyond repair during a storm at Abuja International Airport.

The Nigerian government set a deadline of April 30, 2007 for all airlines operating in the country to re-capitalise or be grounded, in an effort to ensure better services and safety. The airline did not meet the Nigerian Civil Aviation Authority (NCAA)’s criteria in terms of re-capitalization and does not operate services any longer.

== Code data ==
- IATA Code: -
- ICAO Code: SNI
- Callsign: SAVANAHLINE
