= SkyStar Airways =

Airline of Thailand (2005–2009)

IATA	ICAO	Call sign
XT	SKT	SKY YOU
- Founded: 2005
- Commenced operations: 16:00, June 2007
- Ceased operations: 3 January 2009
- Hubs: Suvarnabhumi Airport
- Focus cities: Phuket International Airport
- Fleet size: 4
- Destinations: 10
- Parent company: SkyStar Airways Co., Ltd.
- Headquarters: Huai Khwang, Bangkok, Thailand
- Key people: Archavin Svetasreni (CEO)
- Website: www.skystarairways.com

SkyStar Airways Co., Ltd, operating as SkyStar Airways, was an airline based in Bangkok, Thailand.

SkyStar Airways had 250 employees (2009). SkyStar Airways ceased operations on 3 January 2009 after not paying staff salaries for six months after September 2008.

== Destinations ==
SkyStar Airways served the following destinations (at July 2009):

=== Asia ===
- People's Republic of China
  - Chengdu – Chengdu Shuangliu International Airport [seasonal]
  - Chongqing – Chongqing Jiangbei International Airport [seasonal]
  - Harbin – Harbin Taiping International Airport [seasonal]
  - Nanning – Nanning Wuxu Airport [seasonal]
- South Korea
  - Busan – Gimhae International Airport
  - Seoul – Incheon International Airport
- Thailand
  - Bangkok – Suvarnabhumi Airport hub
  - Chiang Mai – Chiang Mai International Airport [seasonal]
  - Phuket – Phuket International Airport focus city
  - Surat Thani – Surat Thani Airport [seasonal]

== Fleet ==
SkyStar Airways had operated the following aircraft (at 8 July 2009):

SkyStar Airways fleet
Aircraft	Total	Passengers (Business/Economy)	Notes
Boeing 767-200	4	223 (12/211)	1 scrapped at CAN; 2 scrapped at ICN
