= Specavia Air Company =

Russian cargo airline

Volgograd-Spetsavia (Волгоград-СпецАвиа)
IATA	ICAO	Call sign
—	BHV	AVIASPEC
- Founded: 1997
- Hubs: Volgograd
- Fleet size: 36
- Destinations: 22
- Headquarters: Volgograd
- Key people: Sergey Morozov (Director), Viktor G Klyanov (Deputy Director)

Specavia (or Volgograd-Spetsavia, Russian Волгоград-СпецАвиа)) was a cargo airline based in Volgogrod, Russia. It was established in 1997 and ceased operations due to bankruptcy in 2006. Bankruptcy was blamed on a 50% drop in demand which led to a 20% fall in income in 2005. The airline ceased operations with debts of over 10 million roubles. Before operations ceased, Specavia specialised in crop-spraying but also carried out passenger and cargo charters as well as medical flights and search-and-rescue missions.

== Fleet ==
Aircraft type	Active	Notes
Antonov An-2	36	
