= Skyward Aviation =

Canadian airline

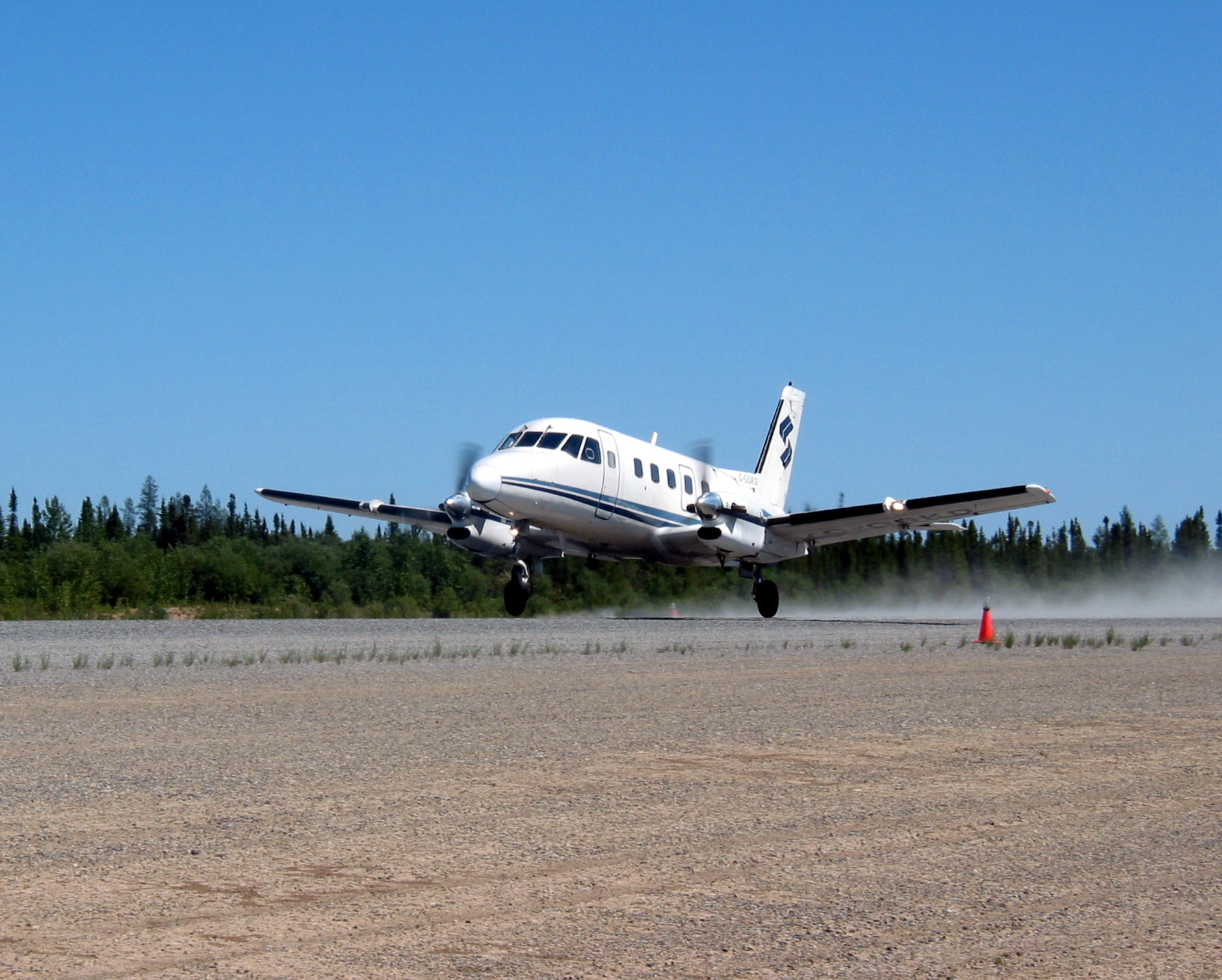
IATA	ICAO	Call sign
K9	SKG	SKYWARD
- Founded: 1986
- Ceased operations: April 1, 2005
- Fleet size: 25
- Destinations: 24
- Key people: Frank Behrendt (President)
- Employees: 260
- Website: https://web.archive.org/web/20050323231755/http://www.skyward.mb.ca/

Skyward Aviation was an airline based in Canada from 1986 to 2005 operating regional passenger and charter flights using propeller aircraft during the 1990s and 2000s.

== History ==
The airline was initially founded under the name of Len's Flying Service in 1986 and operated flights in Manitoba and the North West Territories.

In 2003 the airline lost its Medivac contract but it continued to operate charters out of Rankin Inlet.

In February 2005 the airline's AOC was suspended and shortly after the airline went bankrupt on April 1, 2005.

At the time of its AOC being suspended Skyward was reported to have operated 25 aircraft, most of these concerns were about the way Skyward trained its employees along with the general maintenance of its aircraft. Initially 13 aircraft were pulled out of service as requested by Transport Canada.

Shortly after, the airline announced that it would officially be closing its operations following the revoking of its Air Operator's Certificate.

The assets of Skyward were bought by the regional airline Perimeter Aviation, which did not include the aircraft, the trade name that Skyward used were also bought by Perimeter Aviation.

== Fleet ==
The airline operated the following aircraft

Aircraft	number of	notes
Beech 1900	4	
Embraer EMB-110	4	
Beech KingAir	2	
Cessna 208 Caravan	1	
Cessna 500	1	
Cessna 441	1	
De Haviland Canada DHC 8	1	Written off

== Destinations ==
Skyward operated to the following communities in 2005.

Country	Province	Town	Notes
Canada	Manitoba	Brochet	
Canada	Manitoba	Churchill	
Canada	Manitoba	Cross Lake	
Canada	Manitoba	Flin Flon	
Canada	Manitoba	God's Lake	
Canada	Manitoba	Shamattawa	
Canada	Manitoba	St. Theresa Point	
Canada	Manitoba	Winnipeg	
Canada	Manitoba	York Landing	
Canada	Nunavut	Ariviat	
Canada	Nunavut	Baker Lake	
Canada	Nunavut	Chestfield Innit	
Canada	Nunavut	Coral Harbour	
Canada	Nunavut	Rankin Inlet	Hub
Canada	Nunavut	Respulse Bay	
Canada	Nunavut	Whale Cove	

== See also ==
List of defunct airlines of Canada
