= Samarkand Airways =

Uzbek airline

IATA	ICAO	Call sign
C7	UZS	SOGDIANA
- Founded: August 2005
- Ceased operations: October 2017
- Hubs: Tashkent International Airport
- Destinations: 2
- Parent company: Universal Mobility Solutions
- Headquarters: Samarkand, Uzbekistan
- Website: https://samarqandair.com/en/about-us/

Samarkand Airways (Uzbek: Samarqand Havo Yo’llari, Самарканд Хаво Йуллари) was an airline based in Uzbekistan that performed passenger and cargo charter flights. Established in 2005 out a joint American-Uzbekistani venture based out of Kentucky, the parent company, Universal Mobility Solutions, provided the aircraft for the fleet. The airline intended to establish a regular scheduled cargo route out of Tashkent to Dushanbe in 2008 using Ilyushin Il-76 and Antonov An-12 aircraft, but such a route was not established. Passenger charters were carried out on Tupolev Tu-154, Yakolev Yak-40 and Avro RJ-85 aircraft, while chartered cargo flights used an Antonov An-26.

While the airline still technically exists, its website is gone and it is not in operation.
