= Silverback Cargo Freighters =

IATA	ICAO	Call sign
-	VRB	SILVERBACK
- Founded: 2002
- Commenced operations: 2002/2018
- Ceased operations: 2009
- Hubs: Kigali International Airport
- Focus cities: Bole International Airport; Dubai International Airport; King Abdulaziz International Airport; Vatry Airport
- Fleet size: 2
- Destinations: 24
- Headquarters: Kigali, Rwanda
- Key people: Innocent Mupenzi
- Website: www.silverbackcargo.com

Silverback Cargo Freighters is a cargo airline based in Kigali, Rwanda.

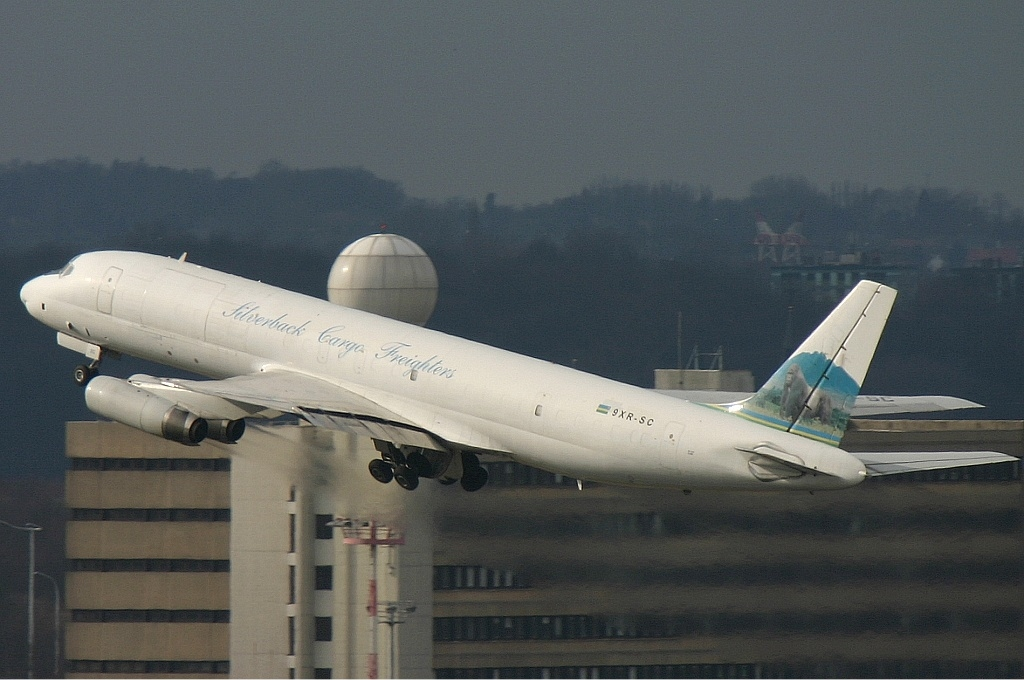
The Silverback Cargo Freighters DC-8-62H

== Banned Status ==
Because of safety reasons, Silverback Cargo Freighters was on the list of air carriers banned in the EU.

== Destinations ==
Silverback Cargo Freighters served the following destinations (at September 2008):

=== Africa ===
- Burundi
  - Bujumbura (Bujumbura International Airport)
- Chad
  - N'Djamena (N'Djamena International Airport)
- Democratic Republic of the Congo
  - Kinshasa (N'djili Airport)
  - Lubumbashi (Lubumbashi International Airport)
- Ethiopia
  - Addis Ababa (Bole International Airport) Focus City
- Ghana
  - Accra (Accra International Airport)
- Liberia
  - Monrovia (Roberts International Airport)
- Nigeria
  - Lagos (Murtala Muhammed International Airport)
- Rwanda
  - Kigali (Kigali International Airport) Hub
- South Africa
  - Johannesburg (OR Tambo International Airport)
- Sudan
  - Khartoum (Khartoum International Airport)
- Tanzania
  - Mwanza (Mwanza Airport)
- Togo
  - Lomé (Lomé-Tokoin Airport)
- Uganda
  - Entebbe (Entebbe International Airport)

=== Asia ===
- Afghanistan
  - Kabul (Kabul International Airport)
- India
  - Mumbai (Chhatrapati Shivaji International Airport)
- Saudi Arabia
  - Jeddah (King Abdulaziz International Airport) Focus City
- United Arab Emirates
  - Dubai (Dubai International Airport) Focus City
- Malaysia
  - Kuala Lumpur (Kuala Lumpur International Airport) Focus City

== Fleet ==
Silverback Cargo Freighters fleet consisted of the following aircraft (as of September 2008):

Silverback Cargo Freighters fleet
Aircraft	Total	Routes
Douglas DC-8-62F	2	Short-Long haul

== Current fleet and destinations ==
The airline has regional routes around Africa and some longer-haul routes to: Dubai, Jeddah, Mumbai and Istanbul.

As of November 2018 Silver Cargo Freighters has the Following aircraft:

Aircraft	In service	Orders	Notes
Boeing 737-300F	1	0	Leased from Star Air (South Africa)
Boeing 737-800BCF	0	2	—
Boeing 757-200PCF	1	0	—
Total	2	2	
