= Servicios Aeronáuticos de Oriente =

SAOSA
IATA	ICAO	Call sign
—	SVO	SERVIORIENTE
- Founded: 1995; 31 years ago
- Ceased operations: 2002; 24 years ago
- Fleet size: 2
- Headquarters: Mexico

Servicios Aeronáuticos de Oriente SA de CV (abbreviated as SAOSA) was a Mexican charter airline.

== History ==
The airline was formed in 1995 as result of deregulation in Mexico and started charter operations in October of that year. The airline started flights to the U.S. in August 1997. The airline filed for bankruptcy in May 2002, but the bankruptcy was declared invalid two months later; however the airline never resumed operations due to the lack of investments, personnel, and infrastructure. Aeromexico attempted to buy and rescue the airline in April 2003, but soon abandoned this plan.

== Fleet ==
- 2 Cessna Citation 650

== Destinations ==
=== Mexico ===
- Acapulco
- Cancun
- Mexico City
- Monterrey
- Toluca
