= Sky Aviation (Sierra Leone) =

Airline based in Sierra Leone

IATA	ICAO	Call sign
-	SSY	SIERRA SKY
- Commenced operations: 2002
- Ceased operations: 2009
- Fleet size: See Fleet below
- Headquarters: Sierra Leone

Sky Aviation was an airline based in Sierra Leone.

== Fleet ==
As of August 2006 the Sky Aviation fleet included:

- 1 Boeing 707-320B
- 2 Boeing 707-320C

Previously operated:

- It did acquire a Boeing 747SP early in January 2003, but was transferred to Kinshasa Airways later the same month.
