= 1987 Belize Air International C-97 Mexico City crash =

Aviation incident in Mexico

1987 Mexico City Belize Air International C-97 crash
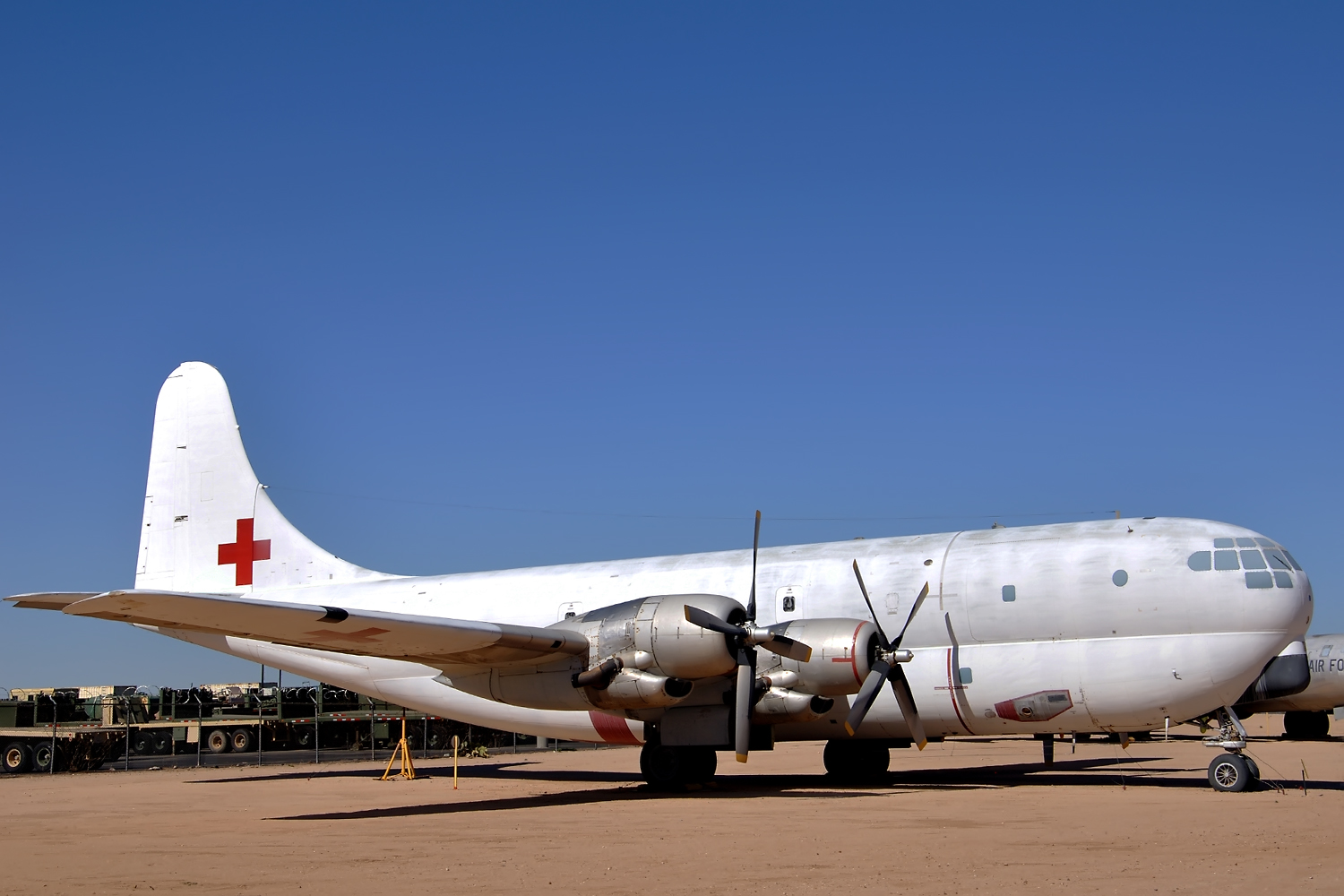
- A Boeing C-97G Stratofreighter similar to the crashed aircraft

Accident
- Date: 30 July 1987
- Summary: Crashed onto highway due to cargo shift and gear malfunction which led to a low climb rate
- Site: Toluca - Mexico City highway, Cuajimalpa, Mexico City, Mexico
- Total fatalities: 49
- Total injuries: 20-30

Aircraft
- Aircraft type: Boeing C-97G Stratofreighter
- Operator: Belize Air International
- Registration: HI-481
- Flight origin: Benito Juárez International Airport, Mexico City, Mexico
- Destination: Fort Lauderdale–Hollywood International Airport, Miami, Florida, United States of America
- Occupants: 12
- Passengers: 8
- Crew: 4
- Fatalities: 5
- Injuries: 4
- Survivors: 7

Ground casualties
- Ground fatalities: 44
- Ground injuries: 20-30

On 30 July 1987, a Belize Air International Boeing C-97G Stratofreighter, bound for Fort Lauderdale–Hollywood International Airport, crashed onto the Mexico–Toluca highway during the late afternoon rush hour. A total of 49 people, including 44 on the ground, were killed in the crash. At least 20 people were injured, with reports that the number could be much higher. The accident was caused due to cargo shifting in the compartment, causing a shift in the center of gravity. A short circuit also caused the landing gear to extend, leading to the aircraft's rapid increase in drag. The crash is the second deadliest aircraft accident involving a Boeing C-97G Stratofreighter.

== Accident ==
The aircraft, a Boeing C-97G Stratofreighter, registered as HI-481, was operated as a cargo flight by Belize Air International. It was carrying 18 champion horses for an equestrian competition in the 10th Annual Pan American Games. The aircraft took off from Mexico City International Airport at 5:01 p.m. Five minutes after takeoff, the aircraft suddenly had difficulty gaining altitude. The altimeter failed, and the crew tried to pull the plane up as it flew directly towards skyscrapers. The pilots managed to dodge several skyscrapers in the city, including the Mexicana de Aviación Headquarters tower and the World Trade Center México. The crew then discussed a suitable place for an emergency landing. Due to a lack of time and controls of the plane, both pilots decided to land the plane on the Toluca - Mexico highway.

A problem developed with the plane's landing gear and caused a short circuit. The short circuit caused small fires on the aircraft, with smoke emitting from its engines. The aircraft then slammed onto the highway with its belly. The wings struck a high tension tower, causing a major blackout in a nearby neighborhood. The aircraft flew under a pedestrian bridge and crashed into vehicles, killing some motorists instantly and seriously injuring others. The plane then skidded down the highway and broke into two sections. The tail of the plane separated from its main body and hit a three-story building, while the rest of the aircraft skidded and impacted the crowded Tras Lomita restaurant. It then exploded in what onlookers described as an "inferno". Parts of the aircraft then flew into a gas station and caused a massive fire.

Emergency services immediately arrived at the scene and pulled several survivors from the wreckage. At least 7 people inside the plane were found alive, including American pilots Frederick Moore and Robert Banty and the load master. Dead horses could be seen after the crash. Two out of 18 horses had to be shot by police, as they were too badly injured. At least one horse survived in good condition and was evacuated from the scene. 12 people were evacuated by helicopter to the Red Cross hospital with third-degree burns. Teresa Marquez of the federal Emergency Rescue Service said at least seven people on the ground were severely burned and taken to two hospitals. At least 25 vehicles were rammed and caught fire due to the crash, and a further 44 people on the ground were killed, bringing the death toll to nearly 50. Officials estimated the plane left a 450-to-600 foot path of destruction as it skidded along the highway.

== Cause ==
In response to the crash, pilot Moore and co-pilot Banty were detained by Mexican authorities. The investigation found that during the climbout process, the horses inside the aircraft panicked and ran around inside the compartment, causing a shift of the aircraft's center of gravity. A short circuit later occurred and caused a gear malfunction, which caused small fires on the body of the aircraft and further panicked the horses.

== See also ==
- National Airlines Flight 102
