= Arrow Air =

US charter and cargo airline (1981–2010)

IATA	ICAO	Call sign
JW	APW	BIG A
- Founded: 1981; 45 years ago
- Ceased operations: June 30, 2010; 16 years ago
- Hubs: Miami International Airport
- Parent company: MatlinPatterson
- Headquarters: Miami-Dade County, Florida, U.S.
- Key people: Luis Soto (President)
- Employees: 1000
- Website: www.arrowair.com

Arrow Air was a passenger and cargo airline based in Building 712 on the grounds of Miami International Airport (MIA) in Miami-Dade County, Florida. The airline was started in 1981 as the latest in a series of aviation businesses controlled by George E. Batchelor, starting in 1946 with an earlier California-based airline Arrow Airways, an irregular air carrier shut down by the Federal government in 1951. Batchelor saw Arrow Air as a re-start of Arrow Airways, though they were separate corporations and separate certificates.

At different times over the years, Arrow Air operated over 90 weekly scheduled cargo flights, had a strong charter business and at one point operated scheduled international and domestic passenger flights. Its main base was Miami International Airport. Arrow Air ceased operations on June 29, 2010, and filed for Chapter 11 bankruptcy protection on July 1, 2010. It was then liquidated.

== History ==
=== California origins ===
George E. Batchelor was a pilot for the Air Transport Command during World War II.. He founded Arrow Airways in Redondo Beach, California on the last day of 1946. Arrow Airways was an irregular air carrier, a hybrid charter/scheduled airline regulated by the Civil Aeronautics Board (CAB), a now-defunct Federal agency which tightly controlled almost all US commercial air transportation at the time. Arrow Airways was prominent among those irregular air carriers that (illegally, see below) offered transcontinental scheduled air service. It called its aircraft Arrowliners. In the 12 months ending June 1950, it had the sixth largest revenue passenger miles out of 49 irregular airlines. At the end of that period, Arrow owned a single Curtiss C-46, but it was known to have flown a Douglas DC-4 leased from California Eastern Airways during the same period. In addition, it's also known (see next paragraph) to have had two Douglas DC-3s during those twelve months.

In 1949, Batchelor established a second airline, California Arrow Airlines (CAA), as an intrastate airline and started flying Los Angeles-Oakland-Sacramento 23 May. In addition, CAA served Fresno for about a month starting in August. CAA had two DC-3s leased from Arrow Airways. CAA was one of eight intrastate airlines that started service that year in California, all failing quickly other than California Central Airlines and Pacific Southwest Airlines. In an article dated December 7, Batchelor was quoted saying that CAA was just about breaking even, that "it is hardly worthwhile operating." December 7 was to be CAA's last day of operation.

On December 7, CAA suffered a devastating DC-3 crash in which Batchelor's own wife and two-year old son died.

Meanwhile, the CAB had launched an investigation into Arrow Airways. On 16 January 1951, the CAB revoked Arrow's "Letter of Registration" (i.e. certificate) as of February 15, 1951 for illegal operation of scheduled service between New York and Los Angeles and New York and Oakland.

Arrow Airways was initially based at Torrance Municipal Airport (also known as Lomita Flight Strip), but at the end it, and California Arrow Airlines, were based at Burbank.

=== Relaunched in 1981 ===
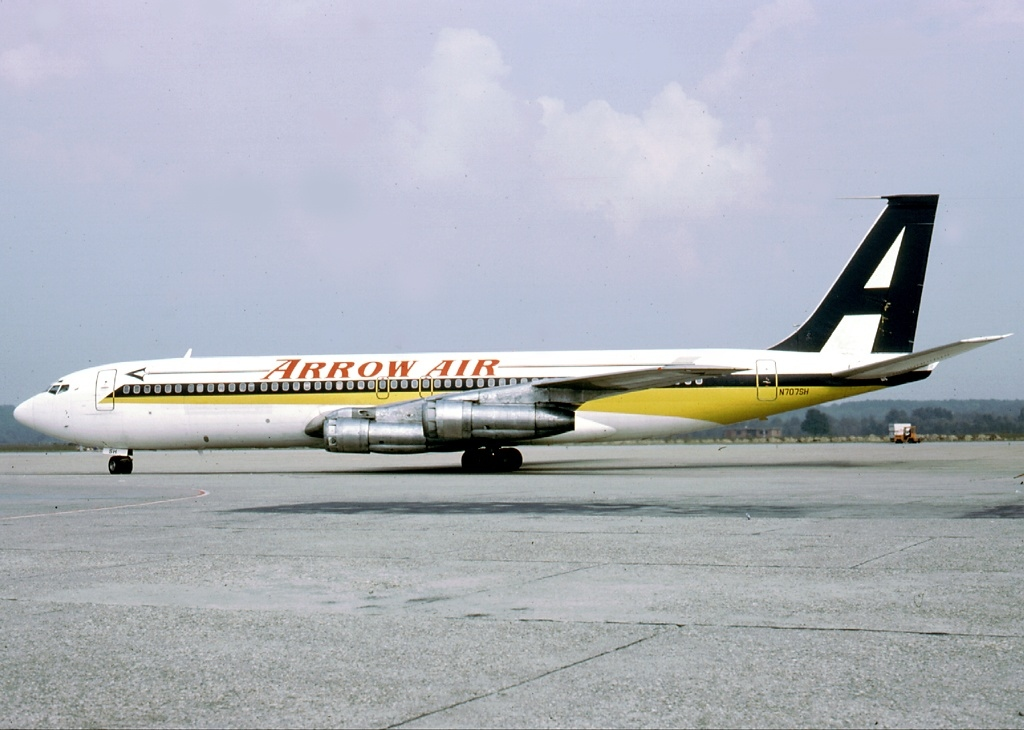
An Arrow Air Boeing 707-320C, in a hybrid Singapore Airlines livery, at Milan Malpensa Airport in 1982

On May 26, 1981, Arrow Air relaunched as a charter airline under Miami's Batchelor Enterprises, whose aviation operations included fixed-base operator (FBO) Batch Air and International Air Leases, Inc., Arrow's parent company. (Batch Air eventually became owned by an employee group and was sold to Greenwich Air in 1987 for more than $30 million.) Arrow added scheduled passenger services in April 1982, beginning with California-Montego Bay.

Low fares were causing the company to lose money. In October 1984, it canceled several routes, including Tampa–London. At the same time, the company reoriented its route structure from an east–west alignment to a north–south one, reported Aviation Week & Space Technology. San Juan, Puerto Rico, where the company was building a new hub, was the center of the scheduled network, and by the end of 1985 Arrow Air was flying between SJU and Aguadilla, Puerto Rico, Montreal, Toronto, New York City, Philadelphia, Boston, Baltimore, Orlando, and Miami. In 1985, more than one million people flew onboard Arrow Air to 245 destinations in 72 countries with the majority of these flights being unscheduled charter service.

Arrow Air was operating Douglas DC-8 and wide-body McDonnell Douglas DC-10 aircraft at this time. Like other start-ups, Arrow contracted some functions to other airlines. United Airlines trained Arrow Air crews in Denver, and Florida Air supplemented Batch-Air's maintenance work.

The company was approved for military charters in 1984, and in October 1985 won a $13.8 million contract with the Department of Defense. This accounted for only a small segment of Arrow's revenues. Most of its business came from scheduled service from Canada and the East Coast to Puerto Rico and Mexico. Commercial charters accounted for another 20 percent or so.

In carrying out its military flights, the airline experienced a large-scale disaster and its second fatal accident and first since the airline's relaunch. On December 12, 1985, one of the company's DC-8s crashed after takeoff in Gander, Newfoundland, killing 248 soldiers of the 101st Airborne Division and eight of Arrow's flight crew personnel. The flight had originated in Cairo and had taken on fuel in Gander after stopping in Cologne, West Germany. The accident resulted in a great deal of unfavorable media coverage and government scrutiny for the airline. Arrow filed for Chapter 11 bankruptcy reorganization on February 11, 1986, laying off 400 employees. However, operations continued.

Richard Haberly was named president of Arrow Air in 1987. Arrow's wet lease business—the practice of hiring out planes complete with crews and fuel—began to pick up again. In 1987, Arrow began leasing a DC-8 to LOT Polish Airlines for a Warsaw–New York–Chicago route. It also provided a long-range Douglas DC-8-62CF jet to Air Marshall Islands which was operated in a mixed passenger/freight combi aircraft configuration on flights linking several remote Pacific islands with Honolulu. In early 1991, Arrow was again carrying U.S. troops, this time for the military buildup preceding the war in the Persian Gulf.

Arrow boasted a 98 percent on-time rate and a high degree of customer loyalty. Rates for Latin American cargo fell 15 percent in the early 1990s as U.S. passenger airlines United Airlines and American Airlines paid increased attention to that market. After a few profitable years, Arrow posted losses in 1992 and 1993. Richard Haberly was succeeded as Arrow president in June 1994 by Jonathan D. Batchelor, stepson of chairman and company founder George Batchelor.

In the mid-1990s, Arrow's fleet numbered 18 aircraft including Douglas DC-8s and Boeing 727-200s (two of which were configured for passengers). Many of the planes were acquired from bankrupt Eastern Air Lines. The company removed the Boeing 727s from the fleet and began leasing Lockheed L-1011 wide-body jets in 1996 when its fleet numbered just nine aircraft. By this time, charter flights for other airlines were accounting for half of Arrow's business.

=== Grounded in 1995 ===
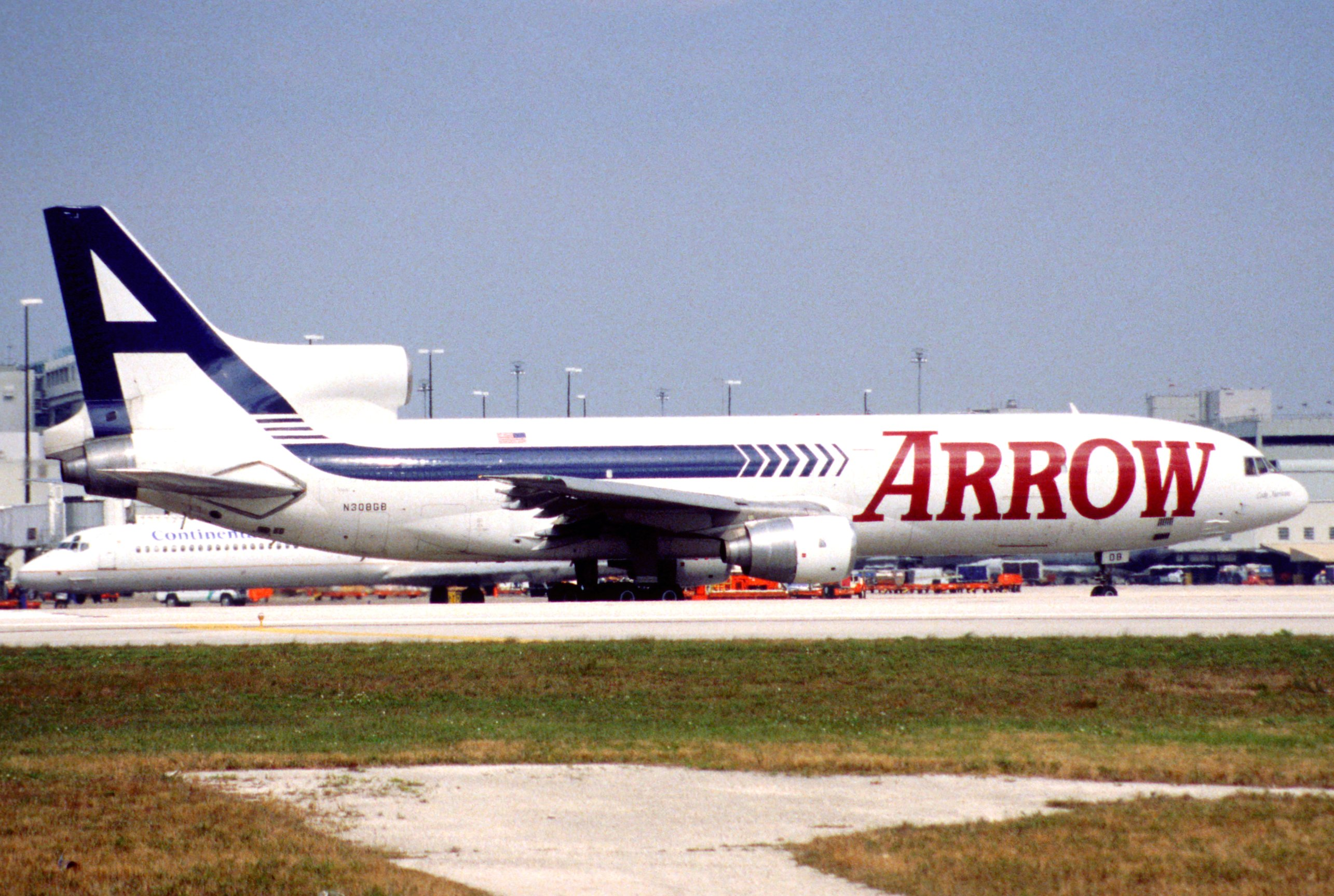
An Arrow Air Lockheed L-1011-100F at Miami International Airport in 1998

Market conditions were not Arrow's only worries. The Federal Aviation Administration (FAA) grounded Arrow in March 1995, charging the carrier had improperly documented maintenance. A company spokesman countered that the grounding was unfair and was related simply to the FAA's request that Arrow prints out a hard copy of its fleet records, which were stored electronically. Company officials blamed the affair on a disgruntled employee who had been fired for theft.

Arrow contracted other carriers to handle its business during the crisis. British Airways, for example, handled the route between Columbus, Ohio, and Glasgow, Scotland. Arrow also laid off 368 of its 587 employees. During the shutdown, Arrow lost $3.5 million, plus another $1.5 million in FAA fines.

The FAA allowed the company to begin flying cargo again in June 1995. Soon, Arrow was carrying more international freight at Miami International Airport than any other carrier. It was connecting San Juan to the Northeast via Hartford, Connecticut; to the Midwest via Columbus, Ohio; and to the Southeast via Atlanta.

A restructuring in June 1996 placed Terence Fensome as president and CEO of Arrow Air. Jonathan Batchelor soon took over again as president, but in July 1998 relinquished that role for the positions of chairman and CEO as Guillermo J. "Willy" Cabeza became president and chief operating officer. Cabeza had been vice-president of operations at Arrow.

Arrow failed to profit from the upswing in the economy in 1997. It lost $15.1 million for the year on revenues of $88.3 million. The company had posted losses of $11.3 million in 1996 on revenues of $61.1 million.

Arrow started a new weekly service from Houston to Peru and Ecuador in February 1998. Houston was billing itself as a "Gateway to Latin America" to compete with Miami, which handled 85 percent of cargo traffic to the region. Arrow revenues were $87 million in fiscal 1998.

=== A merger and a bankruptcy: 1999–2004 ===
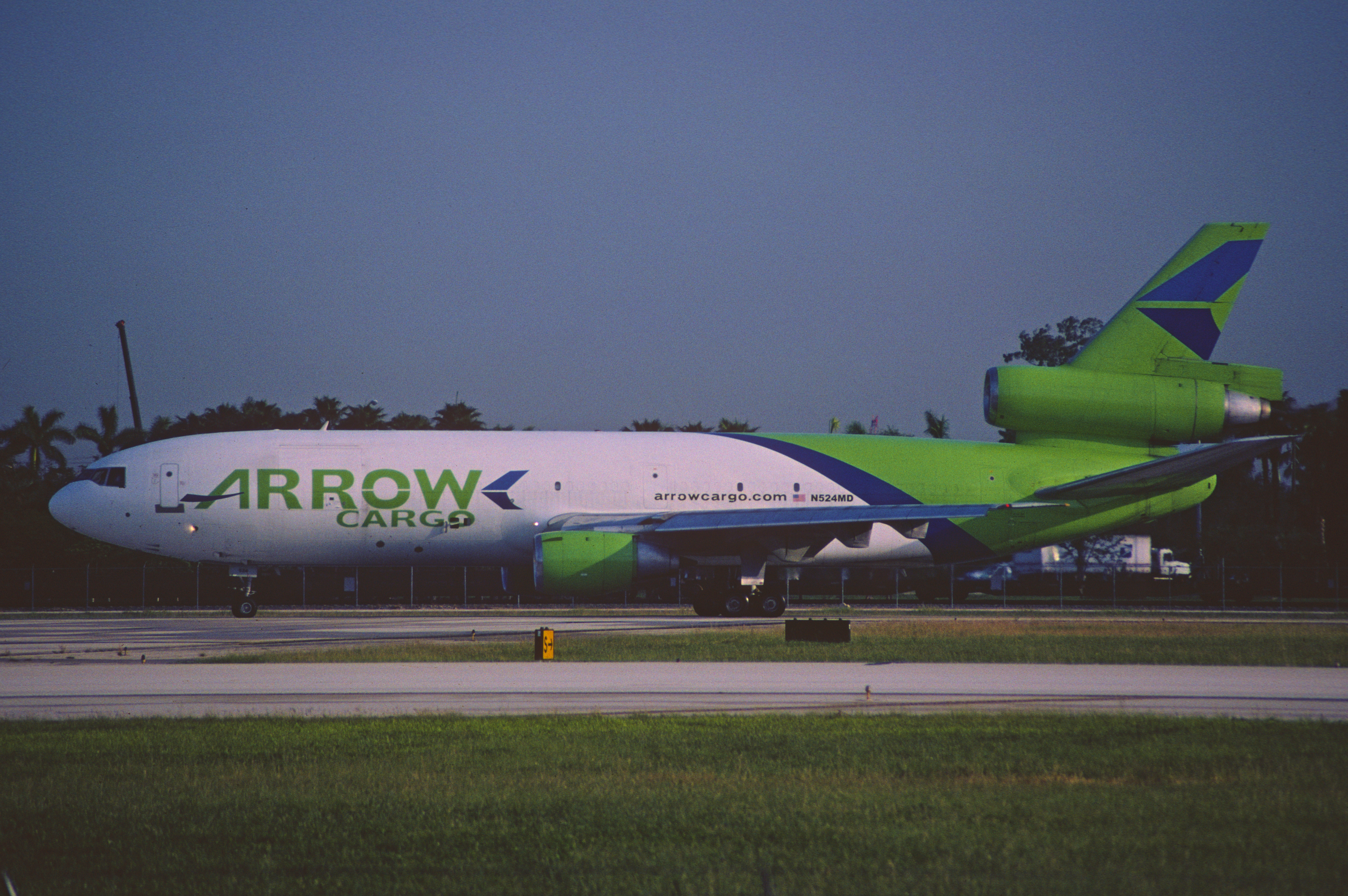
An Arrow Air McDonnell Douglas DC-10-30F taxiing at Miami International Airport in 2005

After a few difficult years, Arrow was acquired by Fine Air Services in early 1999 (the deal was finalized in April) from International Air Leases Inc. for $115 million. Frank and Barry Fine, owners of Fine Air, planned to keep Arrow's brand name viable and continued to emphasize scheduled, rather than charter, cargo service. Included in the purchase were 13 Douglas DC-8 jets, four Lockheed L-1011 wide-body jets, 130 jet engines, and spare parts. The buy gave Arrow access to Fine's 133,000-square-foot (12,400 m^{2}) refrigerated distribution facility for handling perishables, which made up the bulk of Latin American cargo.

Unfortunately, Fine Air had its own set of woes resulting from a fatal crash of one of its DC-8s in August 1997. This scuttled Fine's planned $123 million initial public offerings. Rising fuel costs, a downturn in the Latin American market, and debt left over from its Arrow Air acquisition combined to make the airline unflyable. Fine lost $108 million in 2000 on revenues of $152 million, and another $36 million on 2001 revenues of $148 million.

The company filed for bankruptcy on September 27, 2000, and subsequently merged with Arrow Air, Inc., leaving behind the Fine Air Services name. The Fine family would no longer control the company. It emerged from Chapter 11 in May 2002 as a unit of Arrow Air Holdings Corp., a Greenwich, Connecticut, investment group led by Dort Cameron.

Revenues were $148 million in 2001 when Arrow had about 800 employees in Miami and another 200 in other locations. The fleet had grown to 16 DC-8s and two Lockheed L-1011s; the carrier had also begun leasing a pair of McDonnell Douglas DC-10s.

The new Arrow was losing $3 million a month, reported Traffic World in early 2002, yet the company aimed to break even by year-end. The withdrawal of Grupo TACA's freighters from the market provided Arrow with an opportunity to expand services in Central America with some east–west routes. Arrow re-entered the charter business and diversified geographically via partnerships with airlines such as Atlas Air, Lloyd Aéreo Boliviano, and Air Global International (AGI). AGI had been formed in 2001 and leased two Boeing 747s to carry cargo to South America. Its routes complemented those of Arrow Air, which acquired AGI in March 2002. Operationally, Arrow Air planned to retire its Lockheed L-1011 by 2003 and replace its dozen DC-8s with DC-10s a few years after. In January 2004 Arrow Air filed for Chapter 11 bankruptcy protection, but exited in June 2004 after a bankruptcy court approved its restructuring.

=== Arrow Cargo's strategic alliance ===
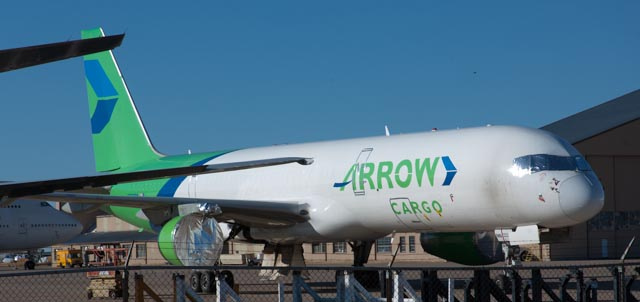
An Arrow Air Boeing 757-200PCF stored at Roswell Airport in 2012

In March 2008, Arrow announced that it entered into a strategic alliance with the firm known as MatlinPatterson Global Opportunities, a private equity investment fund which formerly controlled the Brazilian company Varig Log along with the rebranded ATA Holdings (the parent company of ATA Airlines) which has now been renamed Global Aviation Holdings. As of April, indications were MatlinPatterson would be shuttering Arrow Cargo.

=== End of operations ===
Arrow Cargo ceased scheduled operations on June 30, 2010. After failing to find a buyer, the company was liquidated.

== Transatlantic and South American routes in 1983-84 ==
According to the worldwide edition of the Official Airline Guide (OAG), in 1983 Arrow Air was operating scheduled passenger service with stretched Super DC-8 jets between the U.S. and Europe including nonstop flights between London Gatwick Airport (LGW) and both Denver (DEN) and Tampa (TPA) and also direct between Miami (MIA) and both London Gatwick Airport and Amsterdam (AMS) as well as direct between Tampa and Amsterdam. Also according to the OAG, the airline was flying Boeing 707 passenger service nonstop between New York JFK Airport and Georgetown, Guyana at this time. By 1984, Arrow Air was operating nonstop Super DC-8 service between San Juan (SJU) and Amsterdam (AMS) in conjunction with Surinam Airways which was flying connecting service between San Juan and its home base at Paramaribo at the time. None of these flights were operated on a daily basis but were instead primarily flown several days a week.

== Destinations ==
=== Passenger ===
14 November 1985; markets in bold indicate starting as of 13 December 1985:

- Aguadilla, Puerto Rico
- Baltimore
- Boston
- **Cancún**
- **Caracas**
- **Cozumel**
- **Mérida**
- Miami
- Montreal
- New York JFK
- Orlando
- Philadelphia
- San Juan
- **Tampa**
- Toronto

=== Cargo ===
Cargo Solutions (cargo routes & schedules)

Arrow Air operated the following freight services (at January 2005):

Domestic scheduled destinations

- Atlanta (ATL)
- San Juan (SJU)
- Miami (MIA)

International scheduled destinations

- Mérida (MID)
- Iquitos (IQT)
- Bogotá (BOG)
- Lima (LIM)
- Panama City (PTY)
- San José (SJO)
- Santo Domingo (SDQ)
- Santiago de los Caballeros (SCL)
- Port-au-Prince (PAP)

Scheduled destinations of Arrow Air, Inc. dba Arrow Cargo

- Canada
  - Windsor
- Central America
  - Guatemala City
  - San Salvador
  - San Pedro Sula
  - Managua
  - San José
  - Panama City
- South America
  - Bogotá
  - Medellín
  - Cali
  - Ciudad del Este
  - Guayaquil
  - Iquitos
  - Lima
  - Manaus
  - Quito
  - Salvador
  - Santiago
  - São Paulo
  - Recife
  - Campinas

== Fleet ==
=== Final fleet ===
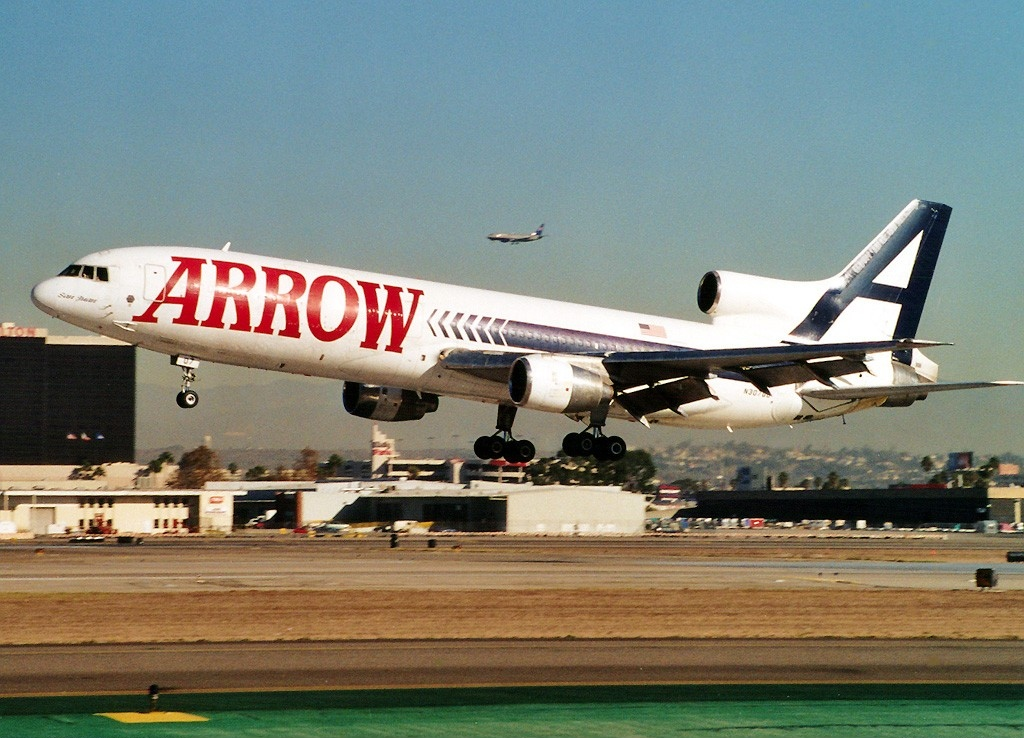
An Arrow Air Lockheed L-1011-100F landing at Los Angeles International Airport in 1999

The Arrow Cargo fleet includes the following aircraft (at Aug 1, 2009):

Arrow Air fleet
Aircraft	In service	Orders	Notes
Boeing 757-200PCF	3	—	
McDonnell Douglas DC-10-30F	3	—	
McDonnell Douglas DC-10-30CF	1	—	
Total	7	—	

=== Retired fleet ===
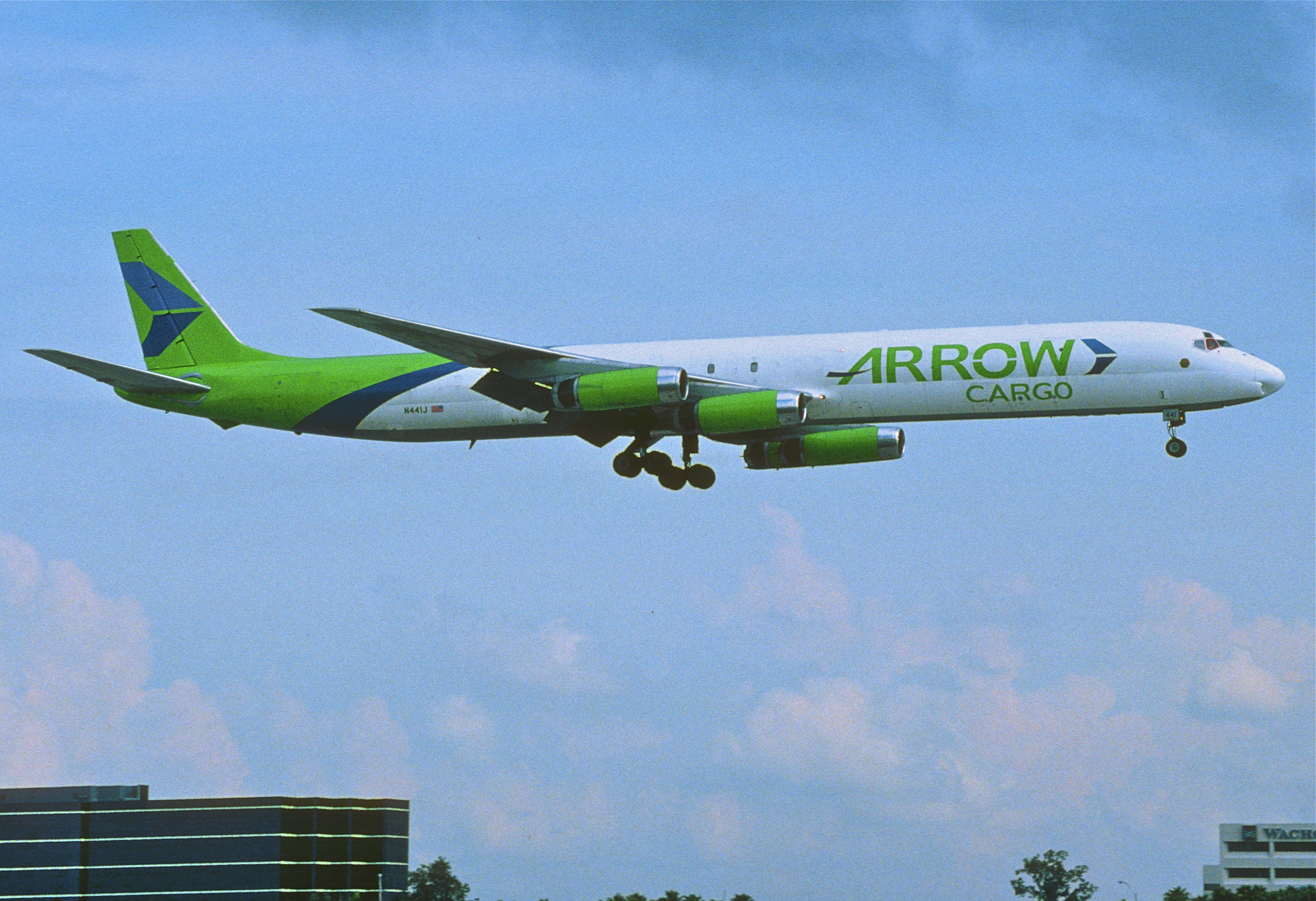
An Arrow Air Douglas DC-8-63F landing at Miami International Airport in 2005

Over the years, Arrow Air had in the past operated a variety of aircraft, including:

Arrow Air former fleet
Aircraft	Total	Introduced	Retired	Notes
Boeing 707-320C	11	1981	1985	
Boeing 727-100C	2	1982	1984	
Boeing 727-100F	1	1992	1994	
Boeing 727-200	5	1985	1997	
Boeing 727-200F	5	1985	1996	
Boeing 747-200	2	2005	2005	Leased from Focus Air Cargo
Boeing 757-200APF	1	2009	2009	
Douglas DC-8-54F	4	1981	2001	
Douglas DC-8-55F	1	1984	2006	
Douglas DC-8-62	5	1984	2005	
Douglas DC-8-62CF	2	1989	2004	
Douglas DC-8-62F	3	1983	2010	
Douglas DC-8-63F	7	1982	2010	1 written off as Arrow Air Flight 1285R
Douglas DC-8-73CF	1	1982	1984	Transferred to German Cargo
Lockheed L-1011-100F TriStar	4	1996	2004	
McDonnell Douglas DC-10-10	7	1983	2010	
McDonnell Douglas DC-10-40	3	2006	2010	

== Livery ==
The livery used when the airline was operating as Arrow Air had a large dark blue 'A' on the aircraft tail, one end of which extended into a line along the fuselage below the window-level and to the nose below the cockpit windows. The remainder of the aircraft was white, with "Arrow Air" titles above the windows forward in red. At the time Arrow Cargo ceased operating, its livery consisted of a white fuselage forward, with blue and green to the rear of the aircraft, and with "Arrow Cargo" titles in green accompanied by a blue logo near the front. N140WE was an Arrow Air plane that was painted all white.

== Accidents and incidents ==
- December 7, 1949: An Arrow Air Douglas DC-3 (registered NC60256), en route from Oakland to Sacramento, flew into the ground near Benicia, California, during bad weather. All aboard (six passengers and three flight crew) died, including Batchelor's 26-year-old wife, Lorraine, and 2-year-old son, George. The plane crashed into terrain at 800 feet (240 m) elevation when its reported altitude was 4,000 feet (1,200 m); it was never determined whether the crash was due to pilot error or an instrument malfunction.
- December 12, 1985: An Arrow Air Douglas DC-8-63CF (registered N950JW), operating as Arrow Air Flight 1285R, carrying American military personnel on a charter flight home for Christmas, crashed in Newfoundland; all 248 passengers 8 crew members on board died.
- On April 4, 2001, at 01:00 AM Arrow Air Flight from Cali after a refueling stop had a nose landing gear malfunction warning. After checklists completed with putting gear handle down, the nose gear down lock indices were inspected through a viewing hole after depressurizing the jet in flight, and the crew found stowaways in the nose gear compartment and the nose gear down lock 1/8" out of alignment in agreement with the warning. They hoped to land with gear held in place by the 3000 psi hyd pressure. They touched down at 120 kias but at about 90 acidic Skydrol fumes came into the flight deck through the open down lock viewing hole. The fumes turned out to be caused by a broken line in the ceiling of the gear well going to the hyd pressure sensor because of it being tightly held on to by one of the stowaways fearful of the gear doors opening again, evidenced by the stainless line being found broken downwards instead of upwards by the crushing event when the loss of hydraulic pressure through the broken line allowed the nose gear to collapse. The two young men's belongings were found next to the hold short line for the runway including a book about the Eastern Airlines L-1011 which had a heated pressurized avionics bay in the nose wheel well. Arrow Air had a L-1011 with the same paint job taking off a couple hours later. The young men mistakenly crawled into the wrong jet to Miami on the dark night at the edge of the runway. This was written by one of the crew members who has evidence and citation of the incident.
- On February 28, 2002, Arrow Air Flight P6L, a Douglas DC-8-62F operated by Arrow Air (registered N1808E), named "Santa Rosa", touched down at Singapore Changi Airport. The tower instructed the aircraft to park at Bay 117. Instead, the aircraft turned right into a grassy area and fell into a ditch where the main landing gears broke off from the aircraft.
- On December 13, 2002, Arrow Air Flight P5L, a Douglas DC-8-62F operated by Arrow Air (registered N1804), named "Caribbean Queen", flying from Yokota Air Force Base in Japan was approaching runway 20R at Singapore Changi Airport. Due to a miscommunication between the First Officer and Captain during landing, when the aircraft touched down only about 1,500 m of the runway was available. The aircraft overran the runway and came to rest about 300 m from its end.
- In 2004, a former Arrow Air Lockheed L-1011 TriStar that was stored at Miami International Airport was damaged by a hurricane. The aircraft had been retired and was waiting for a new operator.
- June 4, 2006: A McDonnell Douglas DC-10-10F (registered N68047) en route from Miami to Managua touched down fast at Managua and was unable to stop before the end of the runway. The aircraft overran the end of the runway by about 350 metres (1,150 ft). The front landing gear collapsed, which led to substantial damage to the engines on the wing of the aircraft as well as a rupture in a fuel tank.
- On March 26, 2009, Arrow Air Flight 431, a McDonnell Douglas DC-10F, (registered N526MD), en route Manaus-Bogotá lost parts of an engine whilst flying over Manaus. The engine parts fell into the city, damaging 12 houses. The aircraft managed to land safely at El Dorado International Airport, Bogotá, Colombia. There were no injuries or deaths in this incident.

== See also ==
- List of defunct airlines of the United States
