= Sinking of MV Windu Karsa =

2011 maritime incident in Indonesia

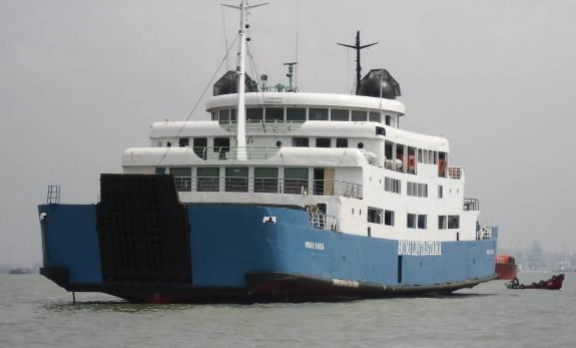
- MV Windu Karsa, the ship involved in the sinking

History
- Name: Bisan (1980 - 1986); Windu Karsa Pratama (1986 - 1999); Windu Karsa (1999 - 2011)
- Owner: Shikoku Kisen KK (1980 - 84); PT. Windu Karsa (1984 - 2006); PT. Scorpa Pranedya (2006 - 08); PT. Bumi Lintas Tama (2008 - 11)
- Port of registry: Jakarta, Indonesia (1986 - 2011)
- Builder: Fujiwara Shipyard K.K
- Launched: 1 May 1980
- Out of service: 26 August 2011
- Identification: IMO number: 8032114; Call sign YDQY (1986 - 11)
- Fate: Capsized off the coast of Kolaka, Southeast Sulawesi

General characteristics
- Type: Passenger ferry
- Tonnage: 1,376 GT, 413 NT, 1,280 DWT
- Length: 56 metres (183 ft 9 in)
- Beam: 4 metres (13 ft 1 in)
- Height: 3.8 metres (12 ft 6 in)
- Draught: 2.92 metres (9 ft 7 in)
- Installed power: 2x Yanmar diesel engines model 62-ST 1,600 horsepower (1,200 kW)
- Propulsion: 4 pcs fixed-pitch spade rudder propellers
- Speed: 12 knots (22 km/h)
- Capacity: 360 passengers
- Crew: 21

MV. Windu Karsa was an Indonesian-flagged double-ended RO/RO ferry that served the route from Luwu, South Sulawesi to Kolaka, Southeast Sulawesi. Built in Fujiwara Shipyard in 1980, she has served in Indonesia for more than 20 years.

On the early hours of 27 August 2011, she capsized off the coast of Kolaka after the Captain ordered everyone to abandon ship. She was carrying 131 passengers and crew members. Search and rescue personnel were called on to the area and managed to rescue 93 passengers and crews on board. A total of 13 bodies were recovered and 23 people were listed as missing and presumed dead.

Investigation by National Transportation Safety Committee concluded that the sinking was caused by the entry of water through a cleft located beneath the ship's rudder. The hydraulic pump of the ship's rudder was flooded by water and caused problems with controlling the ship's movement. As the crew decided to turn the ship back to its previous port, more water managed to enter through the ship's ballast water tank and void space. The ship listed to a point where vehicles on board started to move to its side. A free surface effect eventually caused the ship to capsize.

== Ship information ==
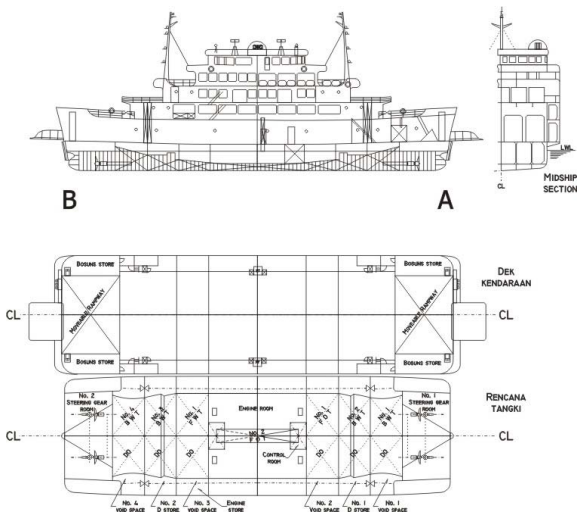
General plan of MV. Windu Karsa

MV. Windu Karsa was built by Fujiwara Shipbuilding in Imabari, Ehime Prefecture in 1980. At the time, she was named as MV. Bisan and was operated by Japanese ferry operator Shikoku Kisen, servicing Naoshima - Takamatsu. In 1986, she was registered in Tanjung Priok, Jakarta as MV. Windu Karsa Pratama. She was later acquired by PT. Bumi Lintas Tama, a ferry company based in Makassar, South Sulawesi.

The ship was powered with two units of Yanmar Model 62-ST diesel engines and each were operated at 680 rpm, producing 1,600 horsepower and driving the ship's 4 fixed-pitch propellers. The propellers were linked with the main engine's gearbox. The ship was also equipped with 4 units of spade rudders, with 2 units located at each ship's ends. The control system was integrated with the steering system. Manual pumps were also equipped in case a malfunction occurred on the steering system.

MV. Windu Karsa was 55.72 metres (182 ft 10 in) long, had a height of 3.80 metres (12 ft 6 in) and draught of 2.92 metres (9 ft 7 in). She had a breadth of 16.20 metres (53 ft 2 in) with a gross tonnage of 1,376 tons She had five decks, consisting of main deck, middle deck, passenger deck, crew accommodation deck and the bridge deck, and could carry 38 vehicles and 360 passengers. She was a double-ended ship, meaning that both the front and the back of the ship can be used as either the stern or the bow (interchangeable).

== Event ==
=== Departure ===
MV. Windu Karsa arrived in Bajo from Kolaka at 04:05 Central Indonesia Time. At 13:00 local time, passengers and vehicles began to board the ship. She was carrying a total of 110 passengers, 21 crew members and 25 units of vehicles. Ground crews finished loading the deck with cargo at 14:00 local time. As everything was set, she departed Bajo at 14:50 local time, enroute to Kolaka, with an average speed of 8 knots. Weather condition was reportedly in good condition with waves of around 0.5 - 0.75 high.

At 19:00 local time, the weather condition started to deteriorate as waves began to reach a height of 2 – 3 meters, with a direction from the east to the west. Winds with speed of 20 knots were blowing from the east to the south.

=== Water on the deck ===
Four hours later, at 23:00 local time, the ship's oiler discovered ankle-high seawater in the stern section (B section) of the ship's main deck. He immediately informed the ship's Radio Officer on the finding. As the ship's Captain received the information, he immediately asked the crews to be prepared in case of an emergency and ordered the Chief Officer to investigate.

As the Chief Officer arrived at the main deck, he further discovered that the water had risen to a height of 30 cm. The ship's inclinometer also suggested that the ship began to list to the starboard. The Chief Officer reported the findings back to the captain and the captain immediately asked to rearrange the vehicles and cargo in the main deck so that the ship would stay upright. The Captain then used the PA system to ask passengers with vehicles to get back to the main deck and to move their vehicles. Vehicles were moved to the bow of the ship so that the stern could stay afloat. However, water kept entering from the stern, reaching a height of 60 cm. The captain then asked his fellow crew members on the main deck to check on the ship's steering room. They soon discovered that seawater had submerged the room. The ship's Chief Officer then ordered crew members to activate the ship's pumps in order to extricate the water out from the room.

By 23:30 local time, the water had reached a height of nearly 1 meter high and the angle of the list increased. Water from the main deck then began to enter the B section of the steering room, submerging the steering engine. At the same time, the ship's helmsman realized that he couldn't control the steering wheel anymore. Crew members reported that water had submerged the motor of the steering engine, causing it to fail. As such, the captain ordered the ship's chief engineer to control the ship with the RPM lever control in the bridge. However, it was futile.

The ship was located only 2 nautical miles from Lambasina Kecil Islands. In an attempt to beach the ship onto the islands, the captain decided to use the main engine in reverse mode. Subsequently, the ship changed its direction, with the bow became the stern. The stern, where water first entered, became the bow of the ship. The captain's attempt was fruitless as the ship was only making circles near the islands. The helmsman then immediately asked the captain to stop his action as this caused even more water to enter the ship.

Minutes before midnight, the angle of list increased by 10 degree. As the stern now acted as the bow, the ship listed to its port. The Captain immediately asked the crews to hand out the lifejackets and asked the passengers to gather at muster station. At least 6 life rafts managed to inflate. As the situation continued to worsen, the captain gave the order to abandon ship. The Chief Engineer turned the engine into neutral position and managed to escape. The Third Officer had tried to issue the abandon ship order to the passengers through the PA system. However, the electrical system had been damaged due to the large amount of water. As such, many passengers were still gathering in the muster station.

On 27 August, five minutes after midnight, the ship capsized at an angle of 90 degree. Due to this, several passengers were thrown out from the ship. In the next five minutes the ship had completely capsized and eventually sank, resting at a depth of 60 m, approximately 10 nautical miles southwest of Kolaka.

=== Search and rescue ===
Passengers were immediately rescued by crews of MV. Mishima, which was serving the same route at the time of the capsizing. At the time of the arrival of Mishima, several passengers had jumped onto the sea while others were found in life rafts. Approximately at 00:40 local time, officials in Bajo began to inform the capsizing on crews from ships near the area. At least 4 ships and 1 tug boat were dispatched from Bajo. By 03:20 local time, a total of 91 people had been rescued.

Indonesian Red Cross and search and rescue team dispatched two helicopters to scour the area for survivors. From 3–5 September, the Indonesian military dispatched frogman (KOPASKA), members of Taifib and members of Koarmada I to the site of the sinking. However, no more bodies were found from the wreckage of the ship. As such, on 6 September, the search and rescue operation was officially ended.

== Casualties ==
As it was mudik season, majority of the passengers were families who were travelling to other families and migrant workers who were returning to their homes. According to the manifest obtained from the port master, there were 57 passengers, 20 crew members and 25 vehicles aboard the ship. Final tally on the number of people on board the ferry, however, was 131 people, consisting of 110 passengers and 21 crew members.

All of the victims were found outside the ship. At least 12 passengers, including a 9-year old child, and one crew member were killed in the accident, while 23 passengers were missing and presumed dead. Two people were slightly wounded in the accident. There were a total of 93 people who had survived the sinking.

Siti Suheriah, Deputy Regent of North Kolaka Regency, was among the passengers. She was travelling her child during the sinking, both of whom survived.

== Investigation ==
=== Water displacement ===
The draught on board the ship was normal until 9 hours after the ship had departed Bajoe when crew members reported that water had entered the ship through the stern (also noted in report as the B section). The water had surpassed the height of the motor and the engine in Section B of the steering wheel control room, damaging the electric hydraulic pump. Due to the presence of water inside the deck, the ship's initial draught of positive 0-35° degree significantly decreased to 0-7.5° degree. However, due to the positive value of the draught, the ship had not sunk yet.

This was immediately changed by the captain's decision to return to Bajoe, as his decision changed the role of the B section of the ship. The B section, which had acted as the stern of the ship, was eventually switched as the ship's bow. This caused more volumes of water to enter through the B section. At this point, the ship's ballast water tank and the No.4 void space were flooded with water, causing the water to rise to 30 cm. As more water managed to get inside the ship, the draught value deteriorated.

Investigators suspected that water had managed to get into the ship from a leak inside the ship's steering room, which had caused flooding inside. The leak was worsened by the ship's left turn. The centrifugal force due to the ship's turning caused the starboard to sink, increasing the hydrostatic pressure of the leaking water. A leak near the propeller later caused the water to enter the No.4 void space and the ship's ballast water tank. Water had also managed to enter from an existing cleft located between the ship's moveable rampway and vehicle deck. As the operator of the ferry decided not to use the moveable rampway anymore, the deck plate was welded with the vehicle deck. The operator left a cleft between the ramp and the deck, which acted as hinges, located above the No.4 void space. This had never been checked for years and hence could cause major leak near the area.

=== Capsizing ===
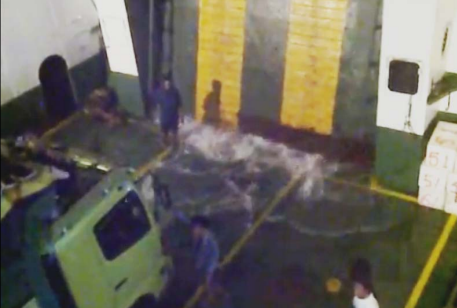
Water entered the ship through the ramp, eventually causing the ship to capsize (taken from NTSC report)

According to investigators, the capsizing of MV. Windu Karsa was caused by multiple factors. The presence of water inside the ship would cause a free surface effect to occur. Simulation conducted by investigators confirmed the presence of free surface effect which caused the ship to capsize immediately. The sinking was also exacerbated by the vehicles inside the ship. Prior to its sinking, the Captain had ordered the passengers and crew members to move their vehicles so that the ship would stay afloat. However, after they had finished moving the vehicles, they hadn't tied their vehicles to the deck with lashing. As the ship listed, the cargo slipped and the ship quickly capsized.

While it is acceptable for a Captain to rearrange the cargo of his ship, it was poorly executed as the crew members didn't secure the cargo from shifting. NTSC noted that the Captain should've stabilized the ship by controlling the remaining ballast tanks in the ship. The captain's decision to move the cargo to the bow should've been a last resort rather than being the first option.

The ship was equipped with multiple freeing ports - which are ports used for extricating water from the ship. These ports were unusable as poor maintenance caused these freeing ports to be blocked by trash.

During the capsizing, the crew members were noted for their poor crowd control as several panicking passengers immediately abandoned the ship. The evacuation was not properly done and some passengers had not left the ship when it started to capsize. Even though the PA system had been damaged due to electrical failure on the ship, the crew members should've issued a manual code for abandon ship by blowing their whistles.

=== Conclusion ===
Investigators concluded that the sinking was caused by the loss of the ship's stability due to a significant free surface effect. Faulty construction, maintenance failure and crew members error were included as contributing factors of the sinking.

== See also ==
- MV Lestari Maju
