= National Airlines (N8) =

American freight and charter airline

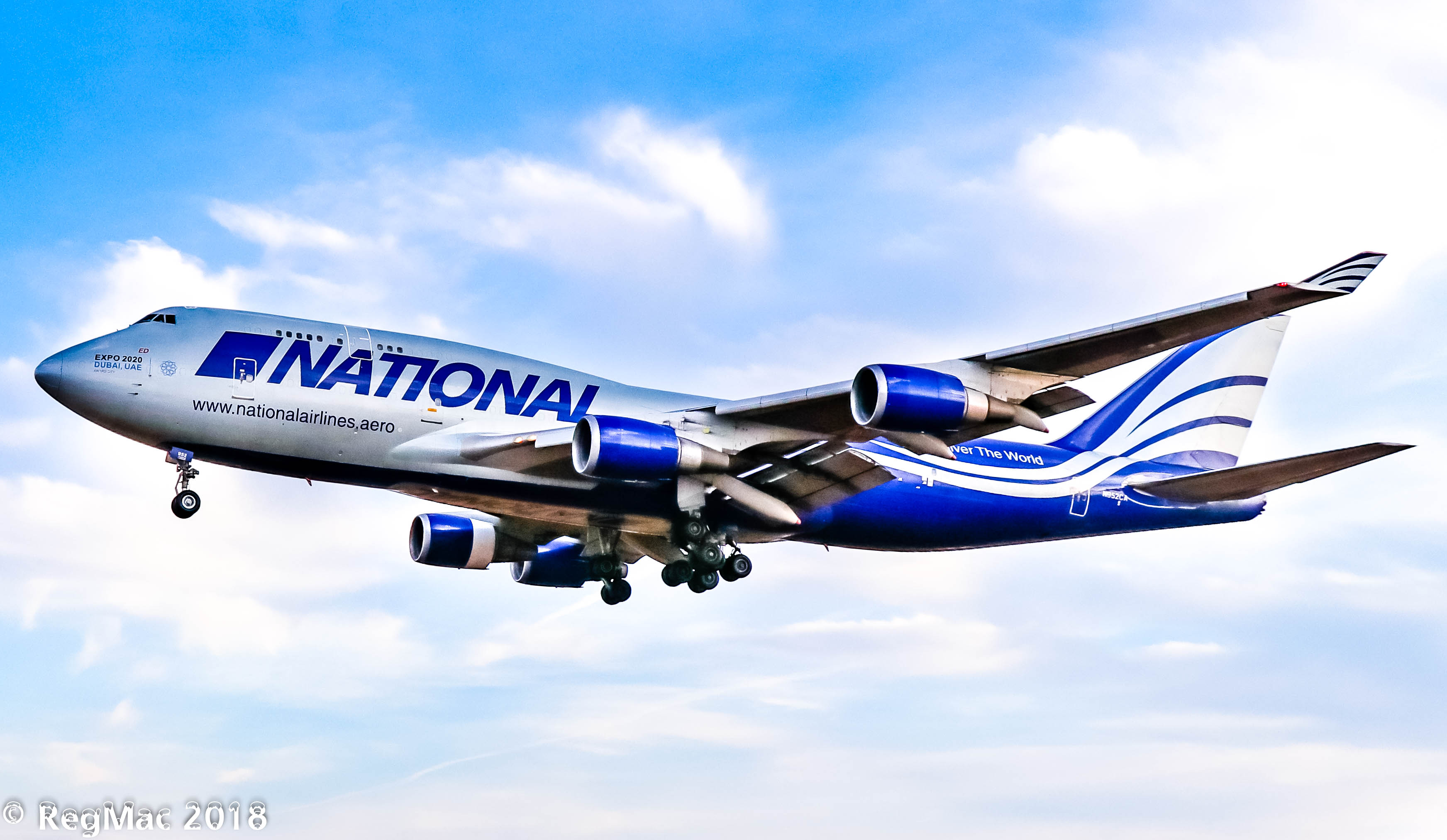
- National Airlines Boeing 747-400BCF
IATA	ICAO	Call sign
N8	NCR	NATIONAL CARGO
- Founded: 1985; 41 years ago
- Commenced operations: December 1986; 39 years ago
- AOC #: U2RA944L
- Hubs: Orlando Sanford International Airport
- Fleet size: 13
- Headquarters: Orlando, Florida, U.S.
- Website: nationalairlines.com

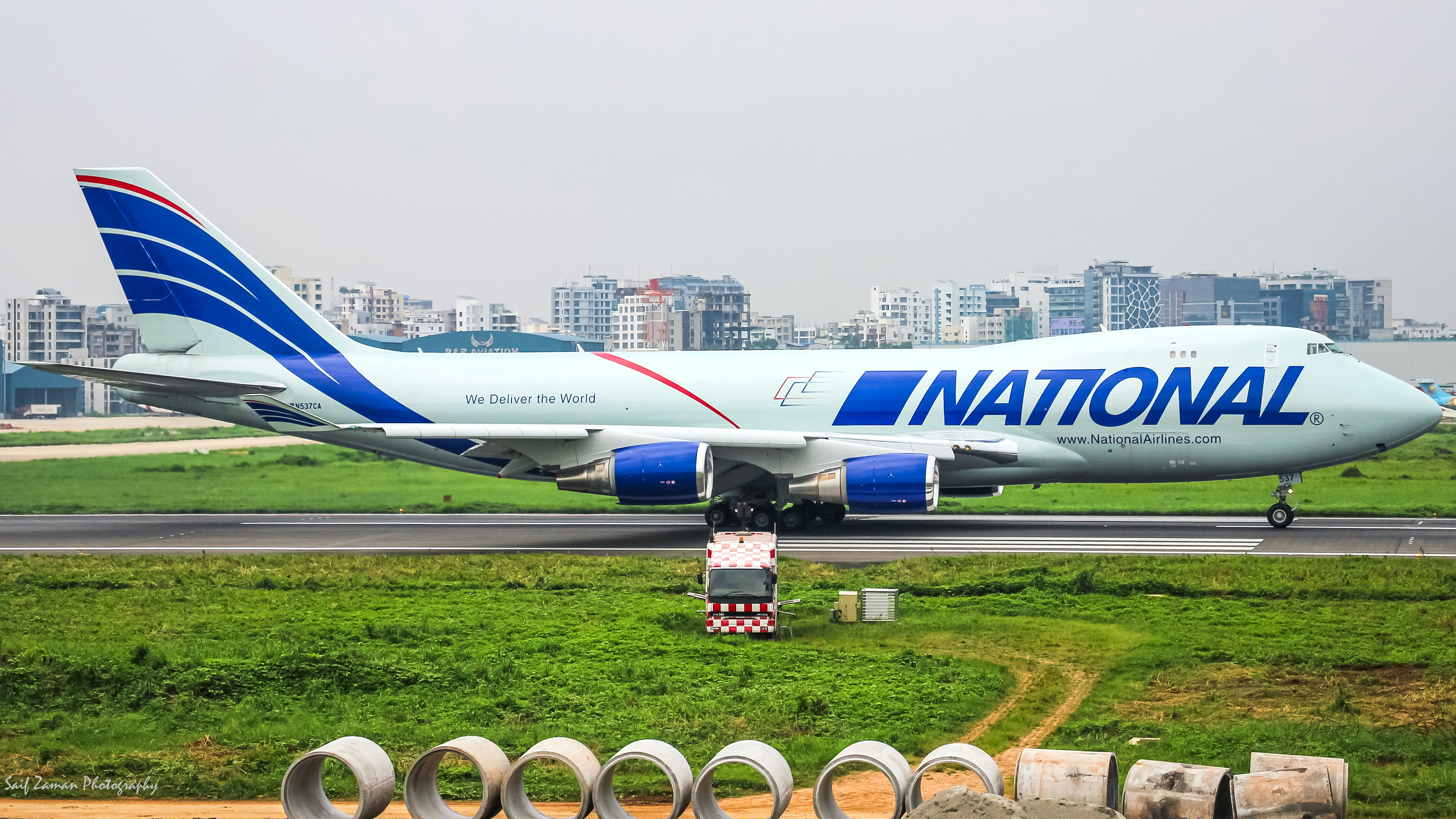
A National Airlines Boeing 747-446F

National Air Cargo Group, Inc., also operating as National Airlines, is a U.S. airline based in Orlando, Florida. It operates on-demand cargo and passenger charter services.

== History ==
The airline was established in 1985 and started operations in December 1986. It began with Mitsubishi MU-2 aircraft, which it developed for cargo use. In April 2005, Murray Air and its sister company, Murray Aviation, merged operations under Murray Air's newly acquired Part 121 certificate. In December 2008, after the airline was acquired by National Air Cargo, Murray Air changed its name to National Airlines, and operates under the National Air Cargo Group, Inc. umbrella.

National Airlines previously operated scheduled charter passenger flights from Oakland County International Airport to Kokomo Municipal Airport in Kokomo, Indiana; Chicago Rockford International Airport in Rockford, Illinois; Spirit of St. Louis Airport in St. Louis, Missouri; and Toronto Pearson International Airport in Toronto, Ontario, Canada (with some flights making intermediate stops at Willow Run Airport in Ypsilanti, Michigan). Flights were focused on Chrysler Corporation employees, but the airline also sold seats on those flights to the general public. These flights were operated by Saab 340 and BAe Jetstream 31 propjet aircraft in 30-seat and 19-seat configurations, respectively. This service is no longer operational.

On the cargo side, National Airlines operated two Douglas DC-8-63CFs (N921R/N865F) and one Douglas DC-8-71F (N872CA) on scheduled and charter operations worldwide, and later replaced one of the DC-8-63CF's with a DC-8-73F (N155CA). In April 2009, the carrier began cargo flights from Ypsilanti, Michigan, to Bagram Air Force Base in Afghanistan; the flights were extended to Kandahar International Airport in August of that year. This service was discontinued in 2010, with the last working flight for the DC-8 with National taking place in May 2012. During the summer of 2010, the airline purchased three Boeing 747-400BCFs. These aircraft were operated for the airline by Air Atlanta Icelandic initially, before being registered in the United States in 2011.

In May 2011, National leased a Boeing 757-200 in an all-passenger configuration and began operating the aircraft in an on-demand charter basis from Dubai. The airline added a second Boeing 757 during the spring of 2013 that was also used for charters in Dubai.

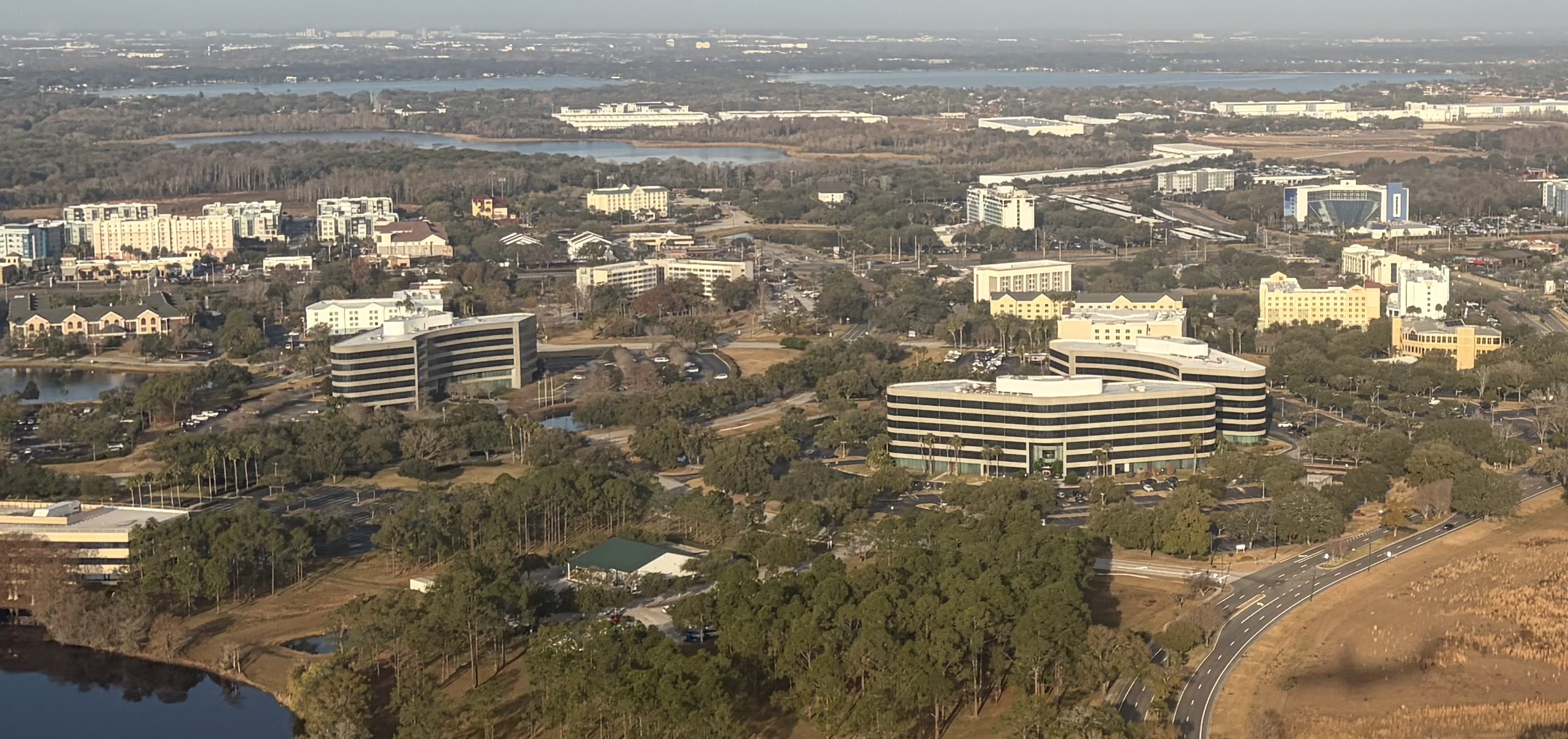
National Airlines' Orlando headquarters is in the office park north of Orlando International Airport.

Originally based at Willow Run Airport in Ypsilanti, Michigan, the company moved in 2012 to Orlando, Florida. In December 2014, the company filed for Chapter 11 bankruptcy protection in an effort to halt a $9.9 million judgment against the company.

In September, 2015, National announced scheduled passenger service from its hub at Orlando Sanford International Airport using their two active 757s. They announced destinations that include St. John's International Airport in St. John's, Newfoundland and Labrador; Windsor International Airport in Windsor, Ontario; Vancouver International Airport in Vancouver, British Columbia, all in Canada, as well as Luis Muñoz Marín International Airport in San Juan, Puerto Rico.

In March 2016, National was slated to start 757 service from Long Island MacArthur Airport in Ronkonkoma, NY to Puerto Rico. However the service was delayed, then cancelled and never operated due to "lack of aircraft."

== Corporate affairs ==
National Air Cargo is headquartered in Orchard Park, New York. The National Airlines division has its offices in Orlando, Florida.

At one point, the airline had its headquarters at Willow Run Airport near Ypsilanti, Michigan. At the airport, the headquarters were in the hangar space. Additionally, National Airlines had 79 employees, including administrative staff, hiring staff and crew schedulers at the Ypsilanti headquarters.

On January 29, 2013, National Airlines completed its move from the Ypsilanti area to Orlando. The airline said that it planned to offer 105 jobs at Orlando, with 26 more than were available in Michigan. Out of the 79 existing employees, 44 relocated. The airline wanted to move its staff into Class A office space as opposed to the previous hangar space. According to Garrett Matyas, the company's human resources director, the company originally considered Ann Arbor, Michigan, and was in talks with the Michigan Economic Development Corp. Instead, Matyas said that the airline moved to Florida due to its business-friendly environment.

The state offered tax incentives for the Orlando location. According to Declan Reiley, the vice president of business development at the Metro Orlando Economic Development Commission, the airline also moved to Florida because two of its owners were Florida residents. The freighter and passenger divisions are involved with contract military airlift operations. The New Zealand Defence Force (NZDF) indefinitely postponed using National Airlines for its airlift requirements after the crash of Flight 102.

In October 2025, My Freighter Airlines signed an interline agreement with National Air Cargo. This partnership aims to enhance connectivity between Uzbekistan, the Middle East, Asia, Europe, and the Americas.

== Fleet ==
=== Current fleet ===
As of August 2025, National Airlines operates the following aircraft:

National Airlines fleet
Aircraft	In service	Orders	Passengers			Notes
Aircraft	In service	Orders	P	Y	Total	Notes
Airbus A330-200	2	—	30	222	252	
Airbus A330-300	1	—	36	263	299	
Cargo fleet
Boeing 747-400BCF	6	—	Cargo			One crashed as Flight 102, another converted from the 747 Supertanker, now in hybrid livery.
Boeing 747-400ERF	1	—	Cargo			
Boeing 747-400F	2	—	Cargo			
Boeing 777F	1	3	Cargo			Deliveries to commence between late 2025 and 2026.
Total	13	3				

== Accidents and incidents ==
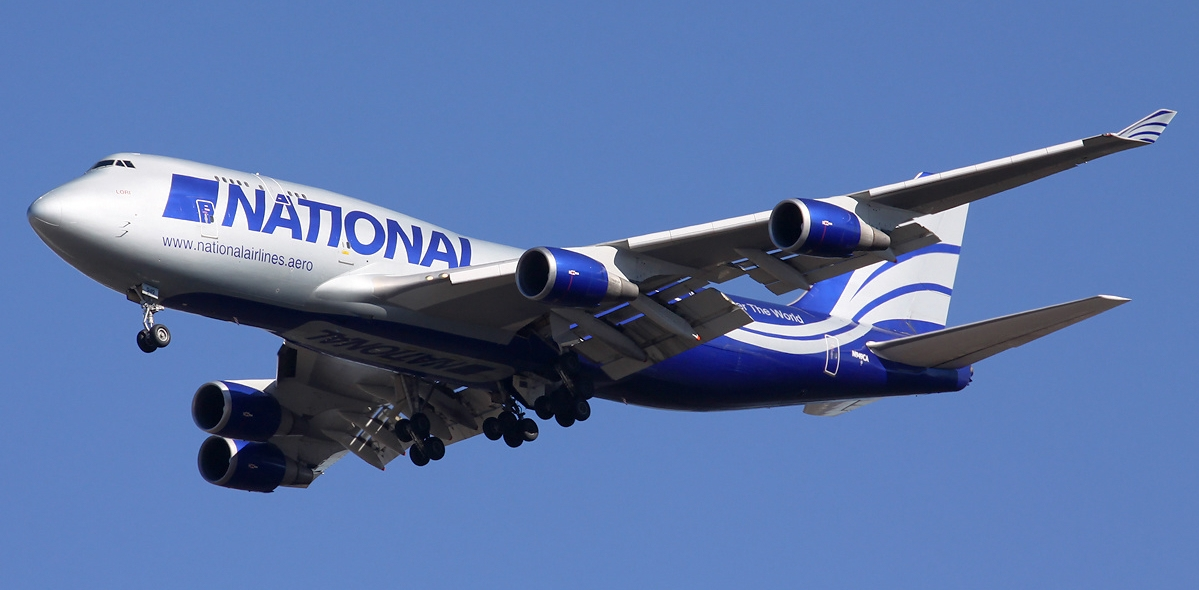
The National Airlines Boeing 747-400BCF (N949CA) that crashed at Bagram Airfield

=== Flight 102 ===
On April 29, 2013, at approximately 3:30 p.m. Afghanistan time (11:00 UTC), National Airlines Flight 102, a Boeing 747-400BCF, registration N949CA, operating a charter cargo flight for Coalition forces, crashed soon after takeoff from Bagram Airfield in Afghanistan. All seven crew members on board died in the crash.

Although Taliban spokesmen claimed responsibility for the destruction of the aircraft, initial reports based on communications from the crew after takeoff indicated that the crash probably resulted from a load shift, causing the aircraft to experience a high-aft center of gravity, becoming unstable and eventually leading to the loss of control by the pilots. On September 14, 2015, the National Transportation Safety Board (NTSB) released their final report, concluding the probable cause of the crash thus:

"National Airlines' inadequate procedures for restraining special cargo loads, which resulted in the loadmaster's improper restraint of the cargo, which moved aft and damaged hydraulic systems Nos. 1 and 2 and horizontal stabilizer drive mechanism components, rendering the airplane uncontrollable."

=== Other ===
On October 29, 2016, the St. John's Airport Authority seized one of the aircraft of National Airlines passenger operations (N176CA, a 757), alleging non-payment for services at the airport during operations there. This was quickly followed by an announcement by the airline that they are cancelling operations into Newfoundland and Labrador as of January 6, 2017, and are also cancelling the substantial majority of flights scheduled for that route between October and the end of service. A hearing was held concerning the claim. National Airlines paid the St. John's Airport authority $182,000 for the services and the airport returned the 757 to National Airlines on October 31, 2016.

On May 1, 2022, Flight 761, a National Airlines Airbus A330-200 (registration N819CA) struck a light pole at St. Kitts' Robert L. Bradshaw Int'l Airport. During taxi, the aircraft's left wing clipped one of the airport's tall light pole, causing it to nearly fall over. The damage to the airplane was minimal, and it flew again on May 4 to Indianapolis.
