= Fine Air =

American cargo airline

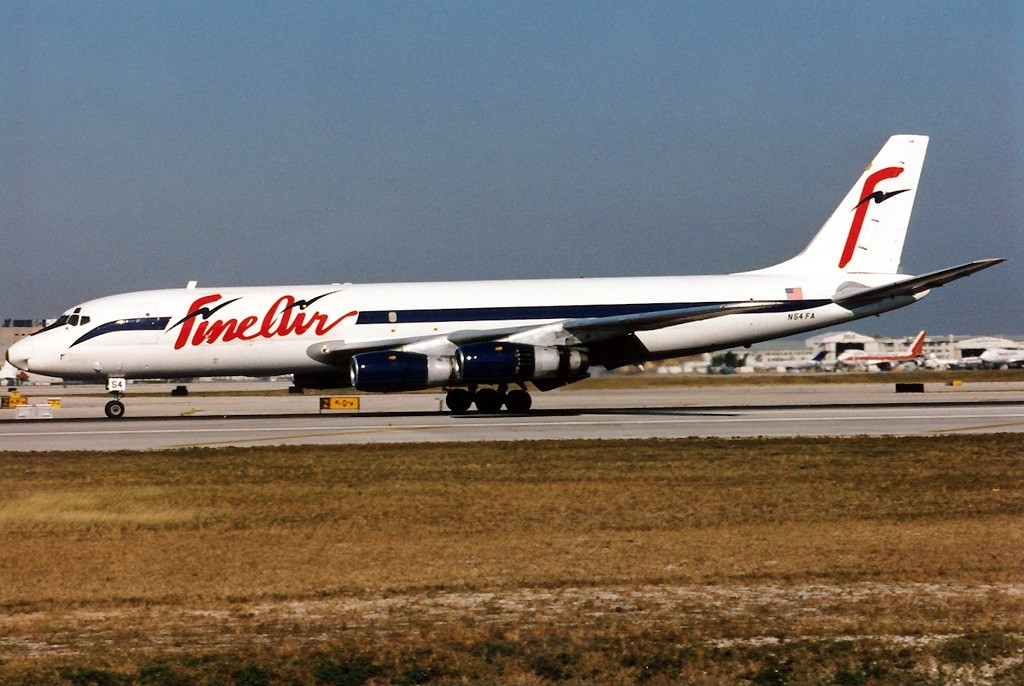
IATA	ICAO	Call sign
FB	FBF	FINE AIR
- Founded: 1976; 50 years ago
- Commenced operations: 1994; 32 years ago
- Ceased operations: 2002; 24 years ago (to Arrow Air)
- Hubs: Miami International Airport
- Fleet size: 16 (as of 1997)
- Destinations: 30 (as of 1997)
- Parent company: Fine Air Services Inc.
- Headquarters: Miami, Florida, USA
- Key people: J. Frank Fine (founder); Barry Fine

Fine Air was an international cargo airline that operated from 1989 to 2002, when it was renamed Arrow Air following its bankruptcy and acquisition. It operated Douglas DC-8 and Lockheed L-1011 type jets to destinations in Central America, South America and the Caribbean from Miami International Airport.

== History ==
J. Frank Fine founded the predecessor of Fine Air in 1976 as a leasing company which owned two Boeing 707 aircraft. Fine owned farming operations in twelve countries in Latin America and the Caribbean, and sought a reliable support system for third-party operators to ship his products to the United States. His company was certified as a Douglas DC-8 repair station in 1986 and received an air carrier operating certificate in November 1992; it began scheduled cargo service in 1994 as the largest international air cargo carrier at Miami International Airport (as measured by tons carried).

J. Frank Fine's son Barry Fine became president in 1997, by which point the airline had a fleet of fifteen Douglas DC-8 aircraft. The airline was wholly owned by the two men for most of its existence.

Fine Air raised $123.5 million in an initial public offering on August 6, 1997, and planned to use the funds to purchase new aircraft and expand its cargo route network to Europe. It was listed on NASDAQ with the ticker code "BIGF."

On August 7, 1997, the day after the IPO, Fine Air Flight 101, crashed shortly after takeoff from Miami International Airport. Fine Air cancelled its IPO the day after the crash, and returned the full amount of the capital raised to investors. It voluntarily grounded its fleet on September 5 as an alternative to having its license revoked by the FAA, but received government approval to resume operations in October 1997.

=== Arrow Air acquisition and bankruptcy ===
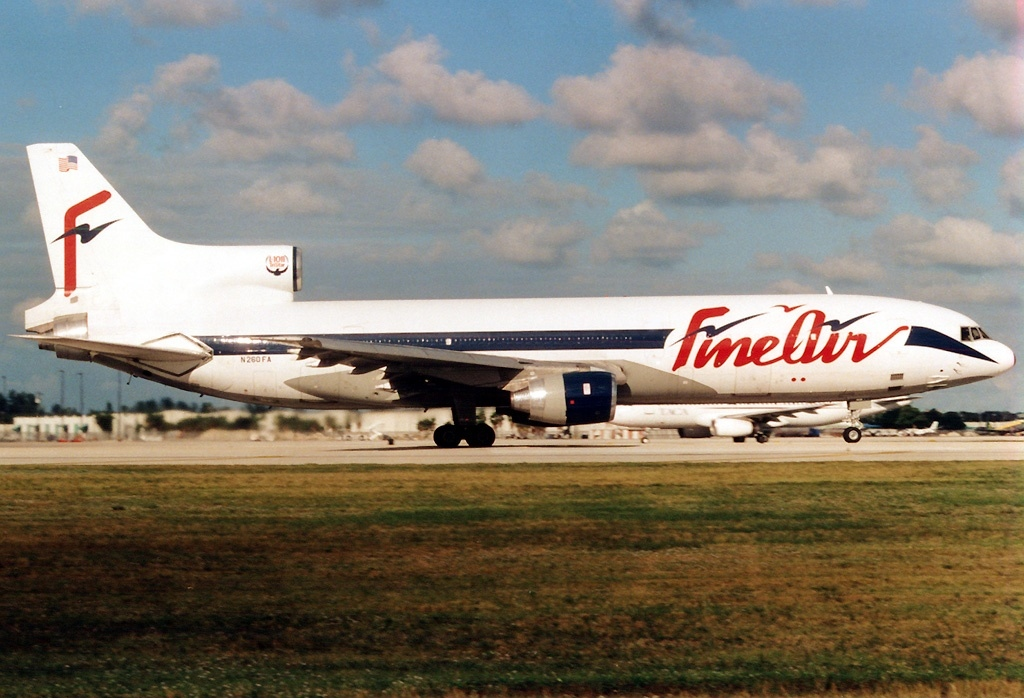
Fine Air L-1011 in 1999

Fine attempted to acquire Southern Air Transport in July 1998 but abandoned the deal in August. In February 1999, Fine Air announced that it would acquire Arrow Air for $115 million in cash.

By 2000, Fine Air had around $200 million in annual revenue, more than 125 scheduled flights each week and a staff of more than 900 employees, handling 240,000 tons of cargo through its Miami hub in 1999.

Fine Air filed for Chapter 11 reorganization in September 2000 after a failed attempt to restructure $137 million in bond debt that had arisen due to the Arrow Air acquisition, citing fuel price increases and other financial issues beyond its control. A private investment group purchased Fine Air in 2002 and renamed it Arrow Air, removing the Fine family from control of the company. J. Frank Fine died in April 2003.

== Accidents and incidents ==
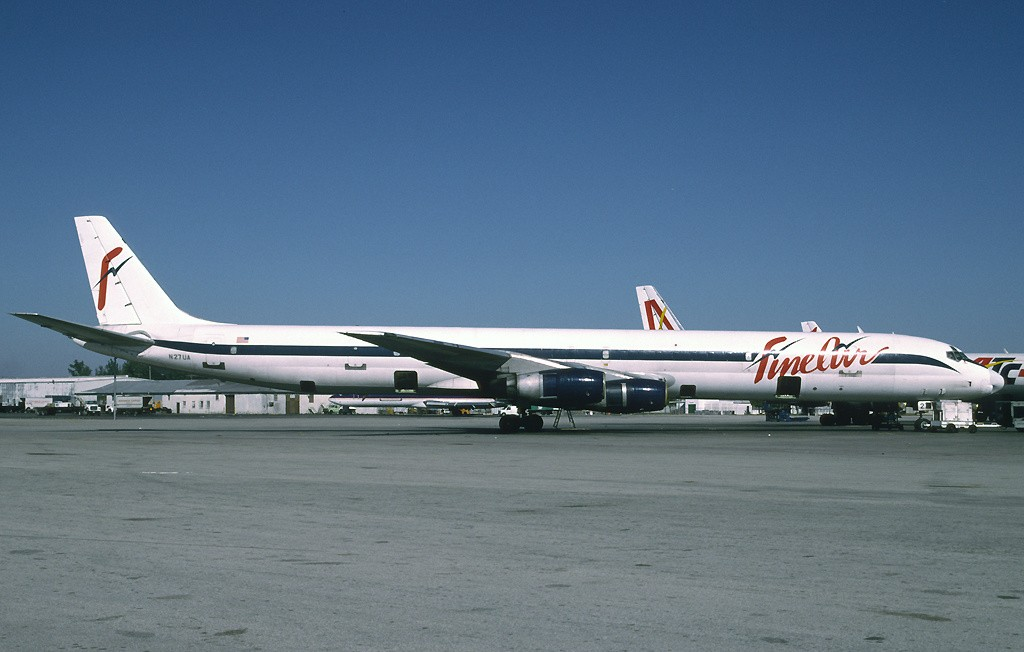
Fine Air DC-8-61F N27UA, the aircraft involved in the Fine Air Flight 101 crash

On August 7, 1997, the day after the IPO, Fine Air Flight 101, a DC-8-61F registration N27UA, crashed shortly after takeoff from Miami International Airport at 12:36 p.m.

The aircraft, bound for Santo Domingo, lost control shortly after V1. Upon rotation the cargo shifted aft on the main cargo deck because none of the pallet locks were engaged upright to the cargo pallets on the main deck. However, the NTSB report finds that "A significant shift of cargo rearward at or before rotation did not occur and was not the cause of the initial extreme pitch up at rotation; although, cargo compression or shifting might have exacerbated the pitch-up moment as the pitch increased." The plane was loaded with two empty pallet positions that allowed for a significant shifting of the center of gravity aft toward the empty spaces. Ground crew interviews found that the flight was routinely full of pallets and the locks were rarely engaged in some opinions, and it was further stated this was because they were thought to be irrelevant if the pallets could not move. Pallets are held by rails at the sides from moving in an upward direction, but only the retractable end locks can stop forward and aft movement. The over-pitching on rotation at V1 pitched the aircraft nose up sharply to the point that air flow into the engines was significantly reduced (similar to blowing across the opening of a soda bottle to make it whistle from the drop in pressure) and causing the engines to stall. The plane then pitched back nose-down landing on its belly on the ground. In addition the aircraft was approximately 2,700 kg (6,000 lb) overloaded, although given the pallet weighing process this was believed to be more common than thought beforehand. The pilots, departing from former Runway 27R (now 26L) attempted to recover but the stalled aircraft lacked any forward thrust rendering the control surfaces useless. The forward pitching aircraft rapidly lost forward momentum and lift with its wings cutting the airflow perpendicular to proper lift orientation. The DC-8 crashed on its belly on a field directly west of the end of the runway (about 300 yards) traveling in a straight line.

The DC-8 missed the auto transport loading facility at the south end of the Miami City Rail Yard just north of the end of the runway, and also busy cargo operations facilities along the very busy NW 25th Street feeder to the airport's cargo area just to the south of the end of the runway. The aircraft barely missed two factories, a commercial building, and the Budweiser Distribution Center in unincorporated Miami, Florida between the populated residential suburbs of Miami Springs and Doral, FL. It skidded across the open field and onto NW 72nd Ave, a roadway that is typically full of traffic during the lunch hour but was surprisingly quiet at 12:36p EST when it came down. The plane's wreckage skidded quickly across the roadway and onto the parking lot of a commercial mini-mall across the street from the empty field; it took out 26 cars in the lot. At that time the mini-mall was a hub of computer parts distributors specializing in South American commerce.

The plane's wreckage fell four feet (1.2 m) short of the entrances to three shops. It missed two occupied cars and a truck that were waiting for the traffic signal at the intersection of NW 31st Street and NW 72nd Avenue, less than 30 yards (27 m) away. Inside one of the cars in the parking lot sat a man who had just arrived back at his shop in the mini-mall after picking up lunch for his wife and himself. He was unable to make it out of the car and was caught up in the fireball that engulfed the multi-lane avenue, field and parking lot. The plane roughly ended up at 25.801826, -80.313439.

Five people died in total: the three aircrew members, a company security guard on the flight, and one man in the parking lot. In the minutes following the crash, police were alerted to a fire at NW 72nd Ave, only to discover it was a plane crash. For nearly 45 minutes, mixed reports claimed the plane was a passenger flight, but within the hour the control tower at MIA confirmed it was Fine Air Cargo Flight 101. FAA Security Special Agents working out of an office on airport property (at that time) responded to the scene and simultaneously to the Fine Air Cargo offices where they took possession of the flight documentation. Some relevant documentations were recovered from garbage receptacles causing a criminal investigation to be opened and ultimately leading to charges including destruction and covering up of evidence. Fine Air and their ground handling agent Aeromar Airlines pled guilty to several of the charges and were fined approximately $5 million.

== Destinations ==
As of the time of its IPO in 1997, immediately prior to the crash of Fine Air Flight 101, Fine Air served the following destinations:

- Barbados
  - Bridgetown
- British Virgin Islands
  - Tortola
- Colombia
  - Bogotá
  - Medellín
- Costa Rica
  - San José
- Dominican Republic
  - Santo Domingo
  - Puerto Plata
- Ecuador
  - Guayaquil
  - Quito
- El Salvador
  - San Salvador
- Guatemala
  - Guatemala City
- Guyana
  - Georgetown
- Haiti
  - Port-au-Prince
- Honduras
  - San Pedro Sula
- Jamaica
  - Montego Bay
  - Kingston
- Netherlands Antilles
  - Aruba
  - Curaçao
- Nicaragua
  - Managua
- Panama
  - Panama City
- Puerto Rico
  - San Juan
- Suriname
  - Paramaribo
- Trinidad and Tobago
  - Port-of-Spain
- Turks and Caicos
  - Grand Turk
  - Providenciales
- United States
  - Miami Hub
- U.S. Virgin Islands
  - St. Thomas
  - St. Croix
- Venezuela
  - Caracas
  - Maracaibo

== Fleet ==
Fine Air operated the following jet aircraft in all cargo operations:

- Douglas DC-8-51
- Douglas DC-8-54
- Douglas DC-8-55
- Douglas DC-8-61 (one crashed as Flight 101)
- Douglas DC-8-62
- Douglas DC-8-63
- Lockheed L-1011

== See also ==
- List of defunct airlines of the United States
