= 1949 California Arrow Airlines DC-3 crash =

Aviation accident on December 7, 1949

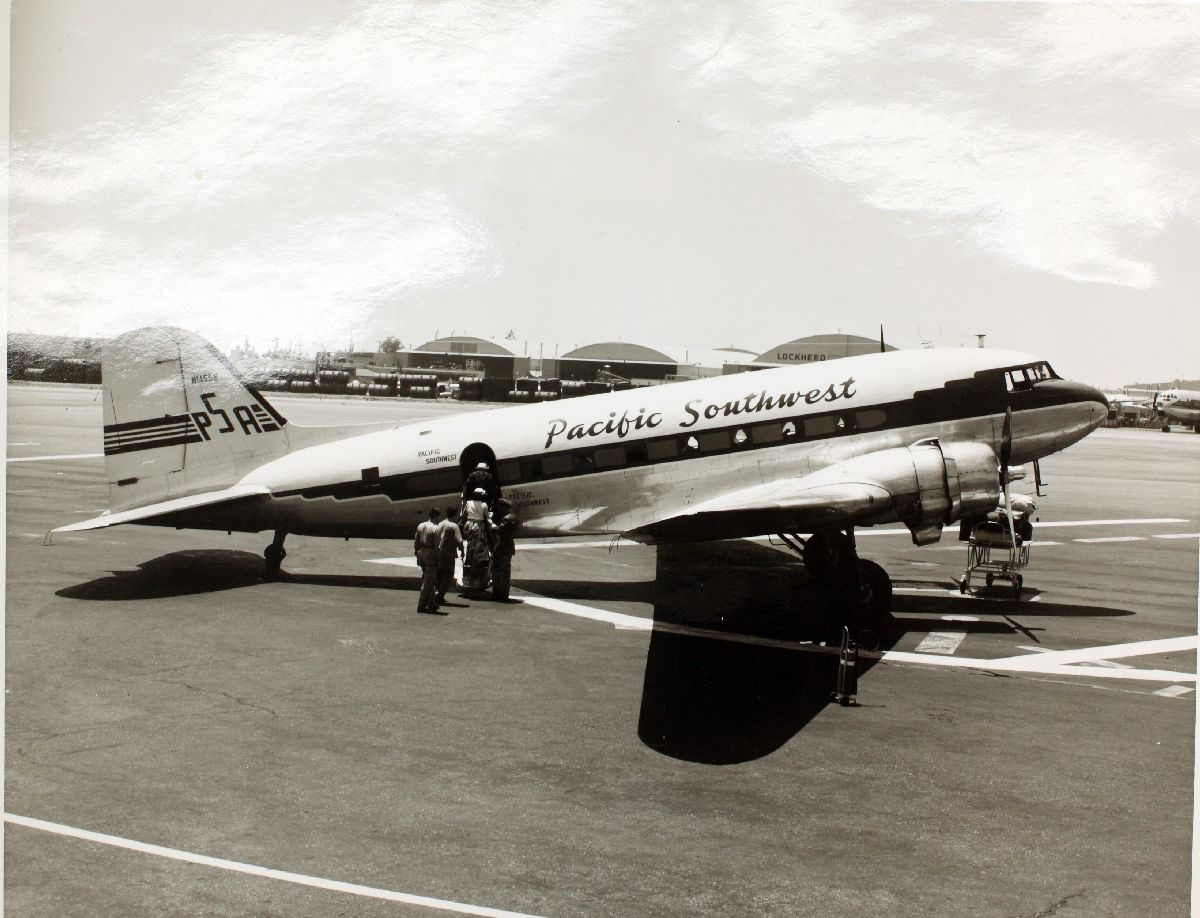
- A DC-3 of Pacific Southwest Airlines, another California intrastate airline that flew DC-3s in 1949

Occurrence
- Date: 7 December 1949
- Summary: Controlled flight into terrain; Undetermined
- Site: 5 miles north of Benicia, California; 38°7′32.0″N 122°8′51.1″W

Aircraft
- Aircraft type: Douglas DC-3
- Operator: California Arrow Airlines
- Registration: NC60256
- Flight origin: Burbank, California
- Stopover: Oakland, California
- Destination: Sacramento, California
- Occupants: 9
- Passengers: 6
- Crew: 3
- Fatalities: 9
- Survivors: 0

The 1949 California Arrow Airlines DC-3 crash was an aviation accident that occurred on December 7, 1949, near Benicia, California. The aircraft, a Douglas DC-3 operated by California Arrow Airlines, was flying from Oakland, California to Sacramento with 9 occupants, when it crashed. The cause of the crash was never confirmed, but evidence pointed towards pilot error. Everyone on board were killed in the crash, including the wife and child of the airline owner.

== Airline ==
California Arrow Airlines, Inc. was a California intrastate airline (in the regulatory system of the time, economically certificated to fly only within the state of California). It was a subsidiary of Arrow Airways, an irregular air carrier owned by George E. Batchelor. Batchelor's wife and child were among the victims of this crash. Batchelor would, many years later, go on to start Arrow Air (1981–2010), a mainly charter and cargo carrier.

== Accident summary ==
The flight departed from Burbank at 2:20 PM, bound for Oakland. In command was captain James Garnett, and the co-pilot Joseph Meade Dillon. The flight to Oakland was uneventful, and when it arrived, 10 passengers disembarked. The plane then departed from Oakland at 4:46 PM, and was scheduled to arrive at Sacramento 5:33. It was carrying 9 occupants, including 3 children. There were reports of bad weather on the flight that night. After takeoff, the flight reached its cruising altitude of 4,000 feet. At 5:08 PM, the flight made a call with the radio station in Richmond, and was assigned to make radio contact with the radio navigation center in Fairfield, 15 minutes later. The call was never made however.

When the flight was reported missing, a search was launched to find the missing aircraft. It was found the next morning on a hillside north of Benicia. All the occupants were reported dead. It was discovered that the flight had descended to 800 feet when it was assigned to maintain 4,000. However, why it did so was never determined.

The accident was investigated by the Civil Aeronautics Board, which discounted the idea that the altimeter was so broken that it showed 4,000ft when the aircraft was actually below 1,000ft.
