= National Airlines Flight 102 =

2013 aviation accident in Afghanistan

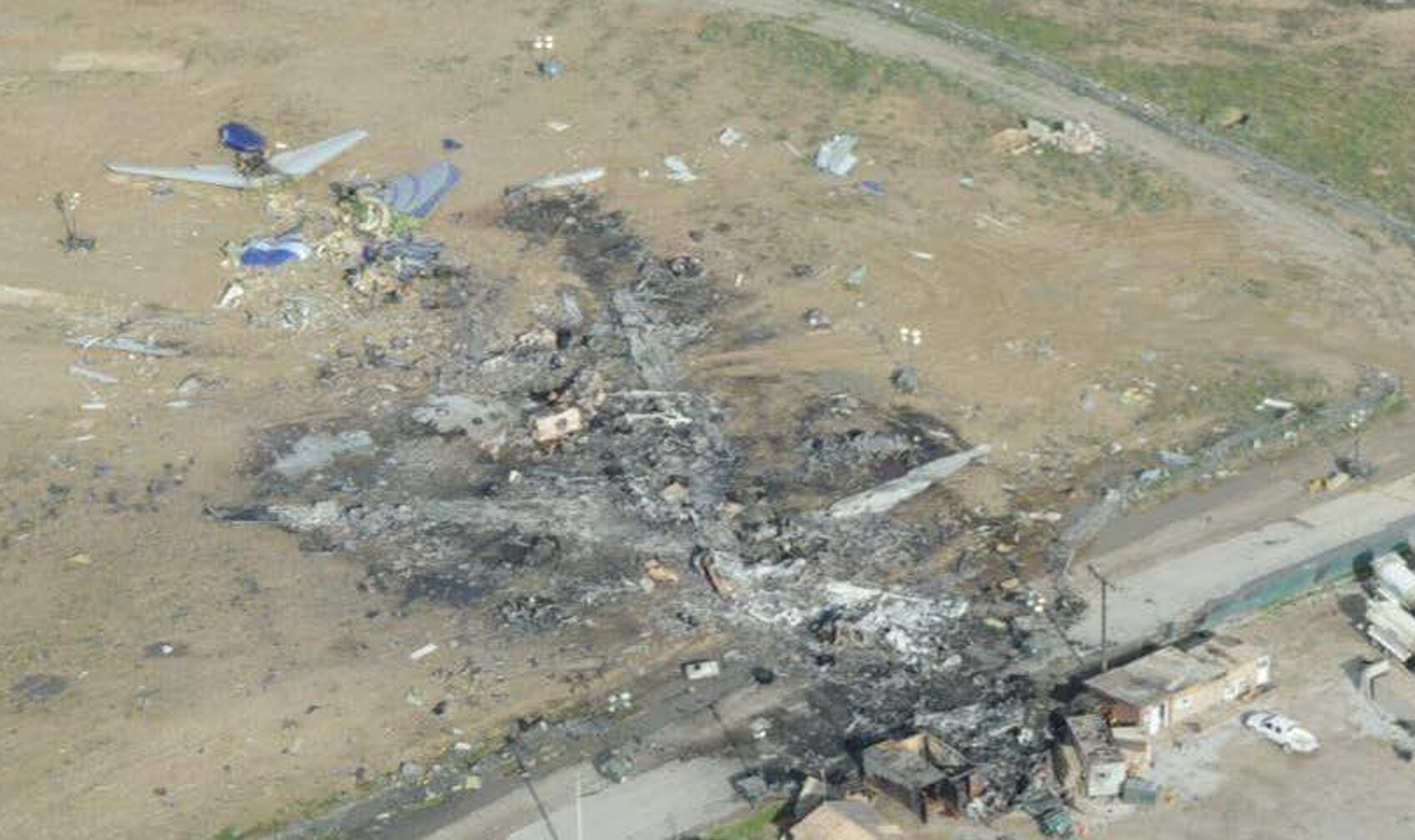
- Aerial view of the crash site

Accident
- Date: April 29, 2013
- Summary: Load shift resulting in stall and loss of control
- Site: Bagram Airfield, Parwan Province, Afghanistan; 34°54′59″N 069°14′24″E

Aircraft
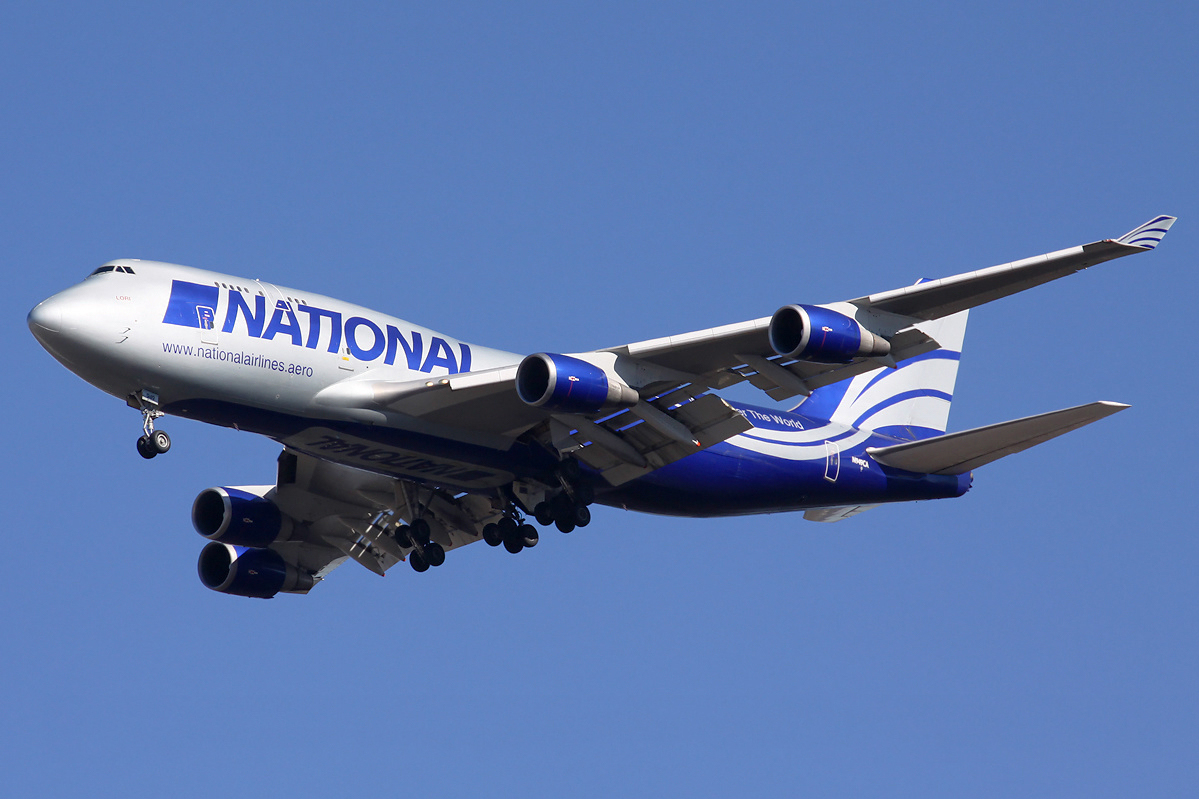
- N949CA, the aircraft involved in the accident, photographed in 2012
- Aircraft type: Boeing 747-428BCF
- Aircraft name: Lori
- Operator: National Airlines
- IATA flight No.: N8102
- ICAO flight No.: NCR102
- Call sign: ISAF 95 ALPHA QUEBEC
- Registration: N949CA
- Flight origin: Châteauroux-Centre "Marcel Dassault" Airport, Châteauroux, France
- Stopover: Camp Bastion, Helmand Province, Afghanistan
- Last stopover: Bagram Airfield, Parwan Province, Afghanistan
- Destination: Al Maktoum International Airport, Dubai, United Arab Emirates
- Occupants: 7
- Crew: 7
- Fatalities: 7
- Survivors: 0

National Airlines Flight 102 (N8102/NCR102) was a cargo flight operated by National Airlines between Camp Bastion (now Camp Shorabak) near the city of Lashkargah in Afghanistan and Al Maktoum International Airport in Dubai, with a refueling stop at Bagram Airfield, Afghanistan. On April 29, 2013, the Boeing 747-400 operating the flight crashed within the perimeter of the Bagram Airfield moments after taking off, killing all seven people on board.

The subsequent investigation concluded that improperly secured cargo broke free during the take-off and rolled to the back of the cargo hold, crashing through the rear pressure bulkhead and disabling the rear flight control systems. This rendered the aircraft stuck in an uncontrollable pitch-up attitude and induced a stall, making recovery by the pilots impossible.

== Accident ==
Dashcam footage of the crash

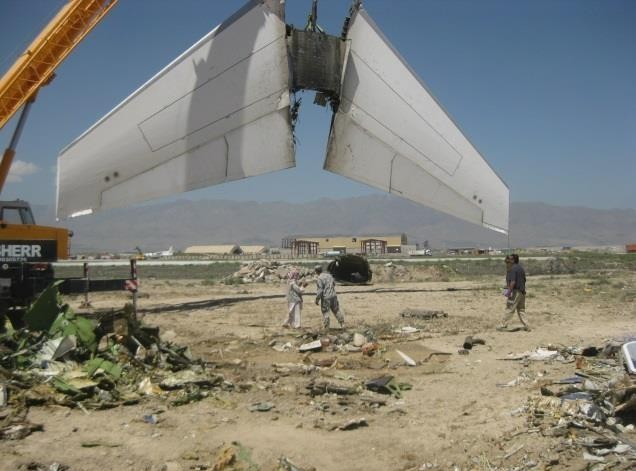
The horizontal stabilizer of the aircraft at the crash site

At the time of the accident, the airline had been operating between Camp Bastion and Dubai for a month. Flight 102 had originated in Camp Bastion, where it had been loaded with five heavy armoured vehicles, had stopped at Bagram Airfield to refuel. The aircraft then took off from Bagram's runway 03 at 15:30 local time and was climbing through 1,200 feet (370 m) when its nose rose sharply. The aircraft then stalled, banked right, and leveled off just before impact with the ground; the whole aircraft exploded into a large fireball, almost damaging the vehicles nearby. The accident site was off the end of runway 03, within the perimeter of the airfield. The seven-person crew consisting of four pilots, two mechanics, and a loadmaster, all of whom were U.S. citizens, were killed in the accident. No one on the ground was injured.

A thunderstorm was also in the vicinity of Bagram at the time of the accident and the wind changed direction by 120° during one hour commencing approximately 35 minutes before the accident. A dashboard camera on a car in the vicinity of the runway end recorded the accident, which shows the aircraft pitching up, falling into a stall, and then sharply banking right after a slight bank to the left, indicating asymmetrical lift. The plane soon righted itself and then crashed at a shallow angle on the ground. CNN stated that a government official speaking on the condition of anonymity confirmed the video's authenticity.

== Background ==
=== Aircraft ===
The aircraft involved was a 20-year-old Boeing 747-428BCF, (Note: The aircraft was a Boeing 747-400 model; Boeing assigns a unique code for each company that buys one of its aircraft, which is applied as a suffix to the model number at the time the aircraft is built, hence "747-428". This aircraft was converted to freighter configuration as part of Boeing's conversion program of passenger 747-400s, hence "747-428BCF" for Boeing Converted Freighter.) registration N949CA, S/N 25630, and named Lori. It was manufactured in 1993 as a combi aircraft, and delivered to Air France and operated as a passenger aircraft until 2007 before it was modified for service as a freighter with Air France Cargo, and was sold to National Airlines in 2010. At the time of the accident, the aircraft was flying on behalf of the United States Air Force's Air Mobility Command.

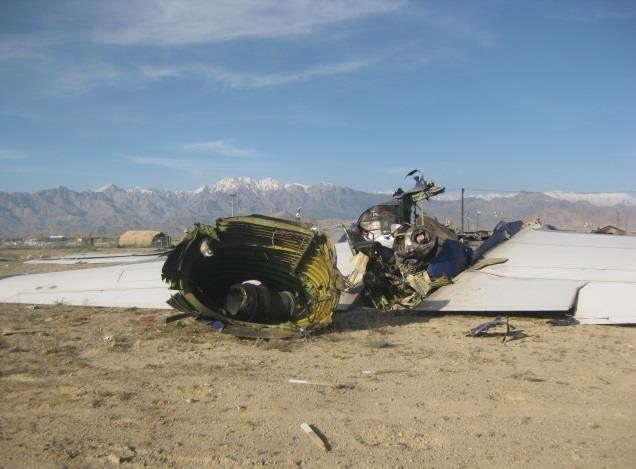
Another view of the wreckage

=== Crew ===
The captain was 34-year-old Brad Hasler, who had worked for the airline since 2004. He had 6,000 flight hours, including 440 hours on the Boeing 747. The first officer was 33-year-old Jamie Lee Brokaw, who had worked for the airline since 2009 and had 1,100 flight hours, with 209 of them on the Boeing 747. The relief crew consisted of captain Jeremy Lipka, 37, and first officer Rinku Summan, 32. The loadmaster was 36-year-old Michael Sheets, who had worked for the airline since 2010. The two mechanics were Gary Stockdale and Timothy "Tim" Garrett, both 51 years old.

== Aftermath ==
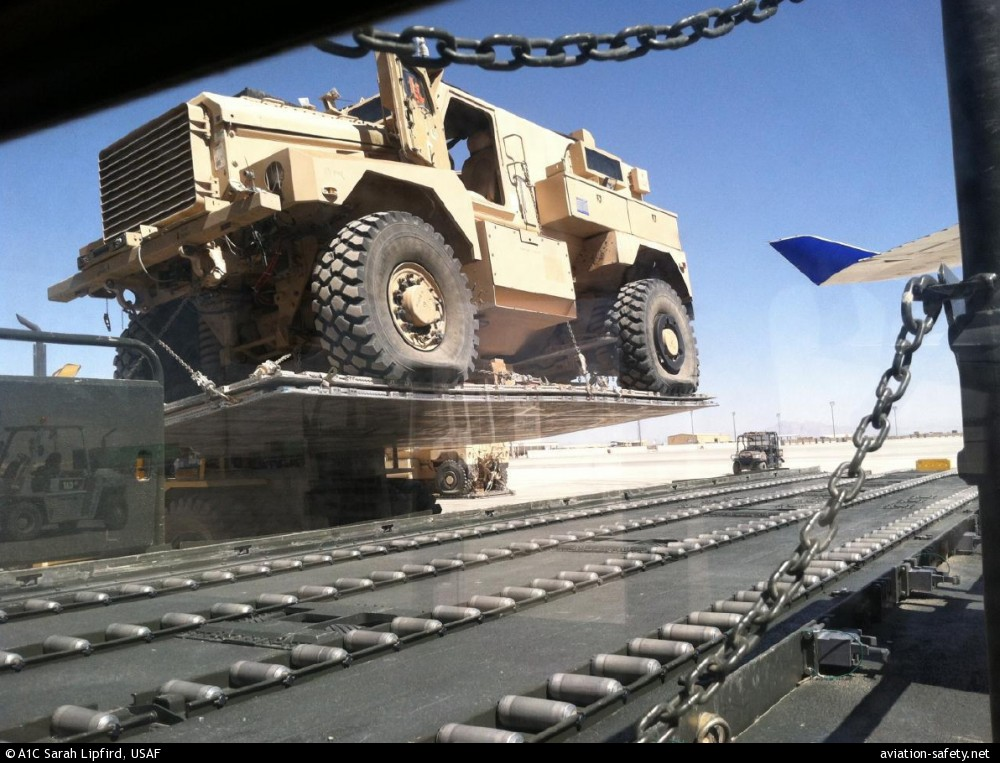
An MRAP being loaded onto the aircraft at Camp Bastion on the day of the accident

The accident interrupted the New Zealand Defence Force's (NZDF) withdrawal from Afghanistan, as it was only hours away from using another National Airlines aircraft to fly equipment out of the country; after the accident, the NZDF indefinitely postponed using National Airlines for its airlift requirements.

The aircraft name Lori was transferred to another National Airlines 747 eight years later, a former Global SuperTanker Services aircraft, registered as N936CA.

Lori was named after Lori Alf, the wife of company owner Chris Alf.

== Investigation ==
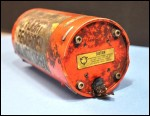
The cockpit voice recorder (CVR) of Flight 102

The United States National Transportation Safety Board (NTSB) and the Afghanistan Civil Aviation Authority investigated the accident. The NTSB reported in a April 30, 2013 press release that representatives of the Federal Aviation Administration and the Boeing Company would also provide technical expertise and aid in the investigation.

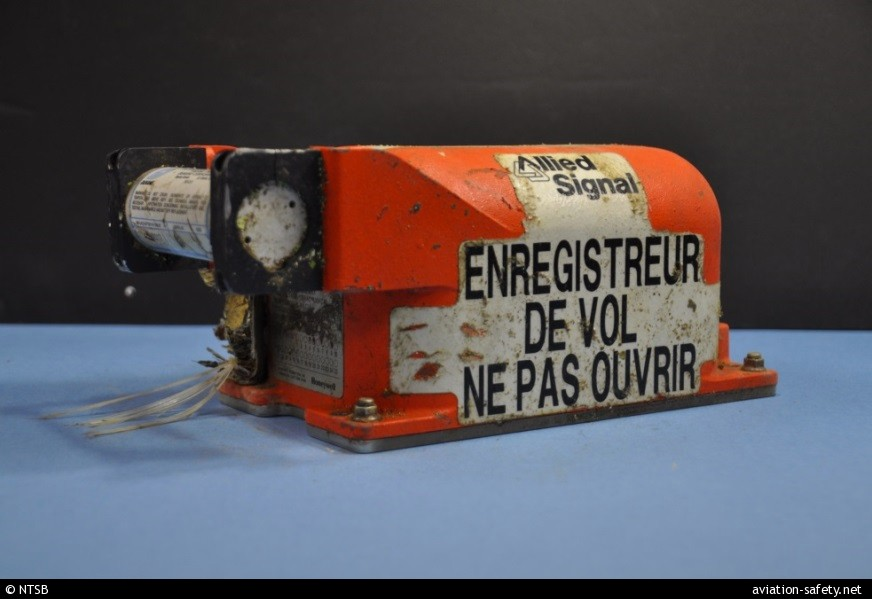
The flight data recorder of Flight 102

On 2 June 2013, investigators from the Ministry of Transport and Civil Aviation of Afghanistan confirmed the load shift hypothesis as the starting point: the cargo of five mine-resistant ambush protected vehicles (three Cougars and two Oshkosh M-ATV's), totaling 80 tons of weight, had not been properly secured. At least one armored vehicle had come loose and rolled backward, struck the E8 rack which housed both the cockpit voice recorder (CVR) and the flight data recorder (FDR), causing them to cease recording, and then crashed through the airplane's rear bulkhead, damaging it. In the process it crippled key hydraulic systems and severely damaged the horizontal stabilizer mechanism, including breaking its jackscrew, rendering the airplane uncontrollable and resulting in the abnormal pitch-up rotation, stall, and eventual crash.

The NTSB determined that the probable cause of this accident was "National Airlines' inadequate procedures for restraining special cargo loads, which resulted in the loadmaster's improper restraint of the cargo, combined with the aircraft being loaded with more heavy vehicles than could safely be secured in it." One of the key recommendations was to mandate training for all loadmasters.

== In media ==
The Canadian TV series Mayday (also known as Air Disasters and Air Emergency in the US and Air Crash Investigation in the UK and the rest of the world) covered Flight 102 in episode 10 of season 16, called "Afghan Nightmare", first broadcast in 2017.

== See also ==
- List of accidents and incidents involving the Boeing 747
- MK Airlines Flight 1602
- Emery Worldwide Airlines Flight 17
- Fine Air Flight 101
