= 747 Supertanker =

2009 firefighting aircraft modification

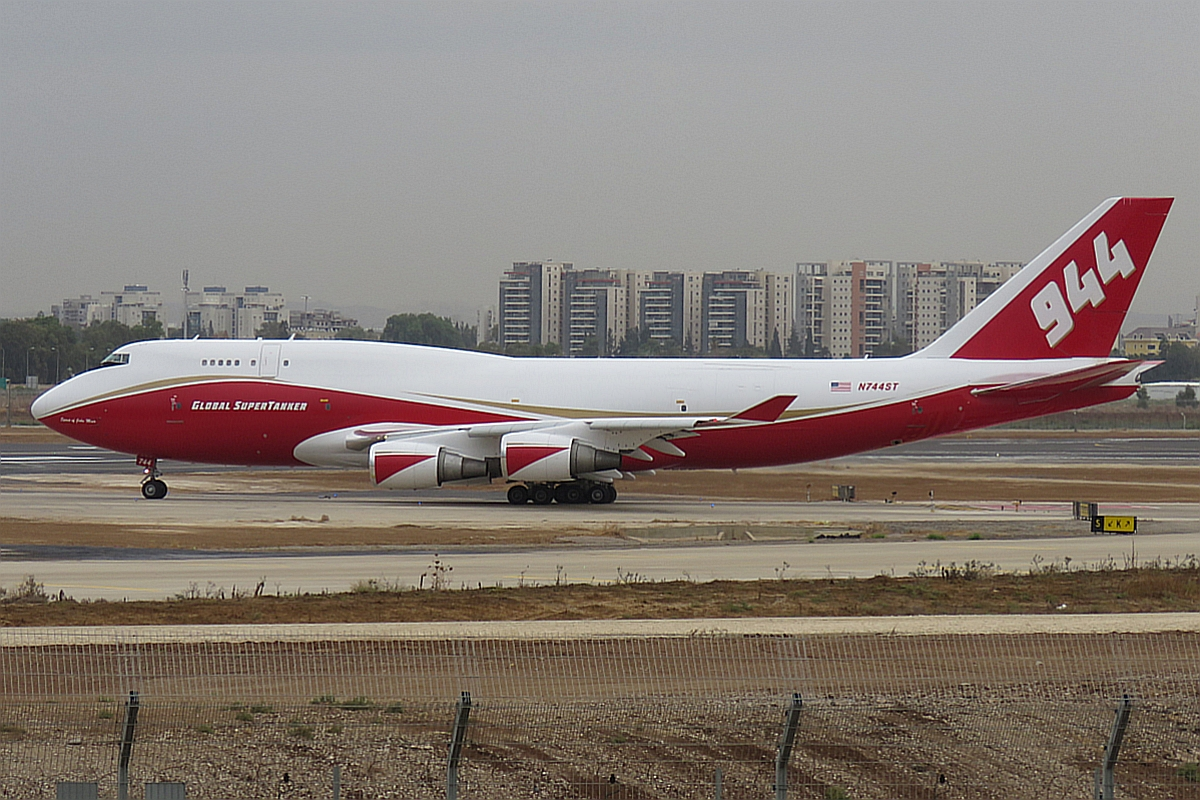
- Global 747-400 Supertanker, N744ST

General information
- Type: Aerial firefighting
- National origin: United States
- Manufacturer: Boeing
- Designer: Evergreen International Aviation
- Status: N744ST Converted into a freighter and sold to National Airlines
- Primary users: Global SuperTanker Services Evergreen International Aviation (former)
- Number built: 3

History
- Introduction date: 2009
- First flight: 2006
- Retired: 2021
- Developed from: Boeing 747

The 747 Supertanker is a retired aerial firefighting airtanker derived from various Boeing 747 models. The aircraft is rated to carry up to 19,600 US gallons (74,000 L; 16,300 imp gal) of fire retardant or water. It was the largest aerial firefighting aircraft in the world.

Initially developed by Evergreen International Aviation, the first Supertanker was based on a 747-200 (N470EV, tanker/tail number 947), but never entered service. The second Supertanker (N479EV, tanker/tail number 979) was based on a 747-100 originally manufactured by Boeing in 1971 for Delta Air Lines. It entered service for the first time in 2009, fighting a fire in Cuenca, Spain, and made its first American operation on August 31, 2009 at the Oak Glen Fire in California. It is no longer in service.

The third 747 Supertanker was developed by Global Supertanker Services, which acquired most of Evergreen's assets. The Global Supertanker (N744ST, tanker/tail number 944) is a Boeing 747-400 dubbed the Spirit of John Muir. It was certified for firefighting flights by the Federal Aviation Administration in September 2016 and fought fires in Chile and Israel before being contracted by U.S. officials to fight California wildfires in 2017. It also took part in firefighting in Bolivia in August 2019. It was then sold to National Airlines and converted back to a cargo configuration in 2021, where it still keeps its original paint as of 2026.

== Development ==
Development started after the 2002 fire season, which saw the fatal crashes of two air tankers in the United States. The accidents, involving a Lockheed C-130 Hercules and a Consolidated PB4Y-2 Privateer, prompted the US Department of Interior to issue an official request for information on next-generation airtankers.

Evergreen proposed to convert up to four of its Boeing 747-200 Freighters into Supertankers. The first converted Boeing 747 (N470EV) made its maiden flight on February 19, 2004.

By June 2006, Evergreen had spent $40 million on the project and was waiting for both US Federal Aviation Administration (FAA) certification and an evaluation contract from the US Forest Service. In October 2006 the FAA issued Evergreen a supplementary type certificate for the "installation and removal" of internal tanks, associated systems and the support structure for the aerial dispersal of liquids.

== Design ==
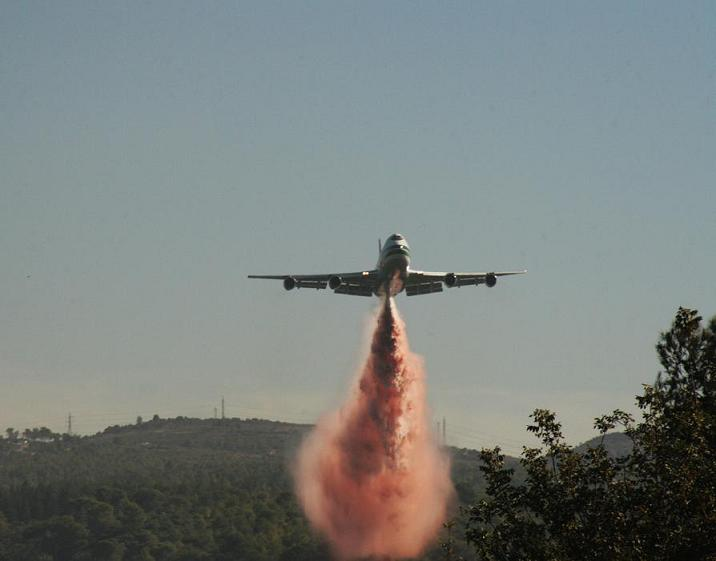
The 747 Supertanker during the 2010 Mount Carmel forest fire in Israel

The Global Supertanker was equipped with a pressurized liquid drop system, which could disperse fire retardant under high pressure or drop retardant at the speed of falling rain. Using the pressurized system, the aircraft could deliver retardant to the scene of a fire while flying at a height of 400 to 800 feet (120–240 m), at approximately 160 mph (260 km/h; 140 kn), configured as if it were on approach for landing. The Supertanker's tank system could be configured for segmented drops, allowing the contents of the tank to be released at multiple intervals while in flight. According to the company, the aircraft was capable of laying down a swath of fire retardant 3 mi (4.8 km) long and as wide as 150 ft (46 m).

A top speed of nearly 600 mph (970 km/h; 520 kn) allowed it to be almost anywhere in the U.S. in approximately 5 hours and reach most of the world in under 20 hours.

=== Operation ===
The Supertanker can operate from any airport with an 8,000-foot (2,400 m) long runway and suitable facilities. In late 2009, the aircraft was under a call-when-needed (CWN) contract with California Department of Forestry and Fire Protection (Cal Fire) and was stationed at Sacramento McClellan Airport outside of Sacramento, California.

Regulations allow for five individuals that are not crewmembers to be carried in the upper deck. This area could be used for command and control, mapping, incident monitoring and video/communications operations.

In December 2010, the Supertanker was deployed to Israel to fight the 2010 Mount Carmel forest fire. This was carried out along with crew and utilities donated by other international fire agencies. On June 9, 2011 the Supertanker was also deployed to fight the Wallow Fire in the US state of Arizona which was at 607 square miles (1,570 km^{2}) burned and uncontained at the time.

Since May 2016, Global SuperTanker has been based in Colorado at the Colorado Springs Airport, chosen in part for its convenient location for quick deployment to the western US and necessary infrastructure for the large and heavy aircraft. Just a few weeks later, the company was awarded a one-year contract from nearby Douglas County to assist with wildfire containment.

In November 2016, the newer N744ST 747-400 Global Supertanker was deployed to Israel to help fight the wildfires raging in the northern port city of Haifa and elsewhere throughout the country.

In January 2017, the Global Supertanker was deployed to Santiago, Chile, to help the local authorities to combat one of the biggest series of wildfires in the country's history. The wildfires in the south of the country, at the time of the arrival of the 747-400, had burnt more than 494,000 acres (200,000 ha) of forests and hundreds of houses. The operation of the aircraft was the initiative of philanthropist Lucy Avilés and her husband Benjamin Walton, who funded the costs.

In September 2017, the Supertanker was contracted by Cal Fire. In December 2017, the plane was leased by Cal Fire during the late-2017 wildfire season with most drops over the Thomas Fire.

In July 2018, the Colorado Division of Fire Prevention and Control signed a CWN contract to use the supertanker over US Forest Service lands. This followed media inquiries earlier in the summer as to why the supertanker wasn't contracted to fight the fires burning in its home state.

In November 2018, the Global SuperTanker was deployed to northern California to assist with the out-of-control Camp Fire in Butte County.

== Evergreen financial difficulties ==
On June 14, 2013, the Supertanker received a call-when-needed contract from the United States Forest Service, despite not being operational. The aircraft was sitting without engines at the boneyard and maintenance facility at Pinal Airpark outside Marana, Arizona, in need of a “C” check and other maintenance, which would cost US$1 million. Evergreen deferred the maintenance because of financial difficulties, planning to have the Supertanker ready in time for the 2014 fire season.

On November 30, 2013, Evergreen effectively shut down operations. In December 2013, Marana Aerospace Solutions proceeded with the sale of the Supertanker, in lieu of rent and other payments that Evergreen had failed to make. An involuntary bankruptcy case was filed against Evergreen later in the month, and then Evergreen itself filed for dissolution under Chapter 7 bankruptcy on December 31, 2013, freezing the sale.

On December 31, 2013, Evergreen International Airlines filed a Chapter 7 petition with the US Bankruptcy Court in Delaware with substantially all assets (including all 747 airframes) subsequently sold to a parts salvage re-seller, Jet Midwest Aviation.

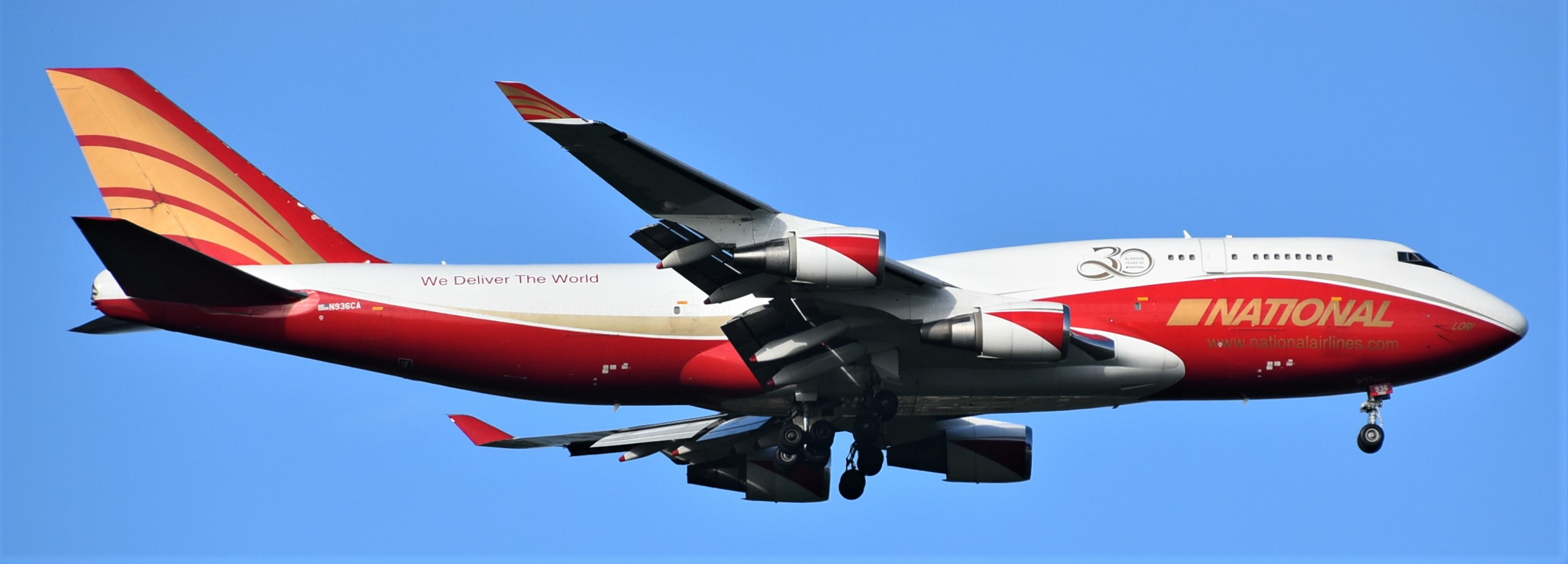
An ex-Supertanker in 2022, after being sold to National Airlines and converted back into a cargo aircraft

In August 2015, Global SuperTanker Services (the successor to the defunct Evergreen Supertanker Services), purchased all the physical assets and intellectual property related to Evergreen's original Supertanker (except the 747-100 airframe itself) from Jet Midwest. They transplanted the existing sprayer tank system from the 747-100 into the newer Boeing 747-400 (N744ST, Ex Japan Airlines, JA8086) airframe.

On July 12, 2017, tail number 979 was intentionally destroyed for salvage at Pinal Airpark, in Marana, Arizona.

In 2021, Global SuperTanker Services began facing financial difficulties, and in April 2021, the company shut down. They sold the Supertanker N744ST to National Airlines to be converted into a cargo aircraft and changed the registration to N936CA.
