= Fine Air Flight 101 =

1997 aircraft accident in Florida

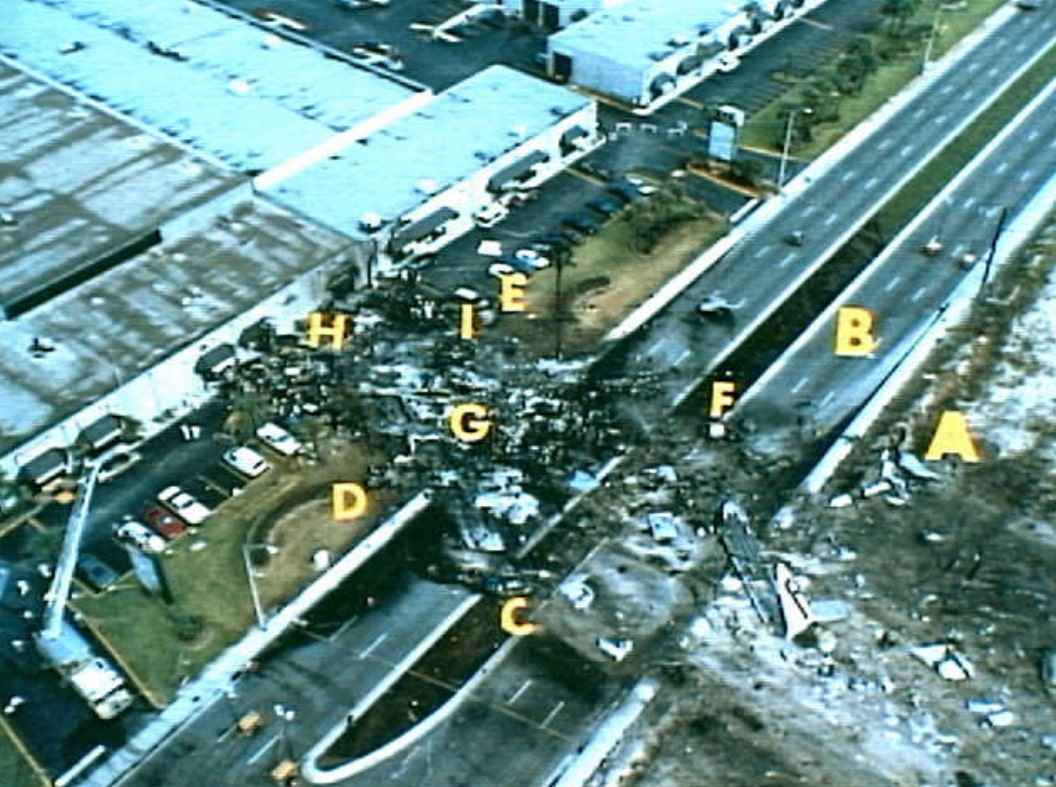
- Aerial view of the crash site

Accident
- Date: August 7, 1997
- Summary: Stalled on take-off due to unsuitable cargo load distribution
- Site: Miami International Airport, Miami, Florida, United States; 25°48′1″N 80°18′47″W
- Total fatalities: 5
- Total injuries: 2

Aircraft
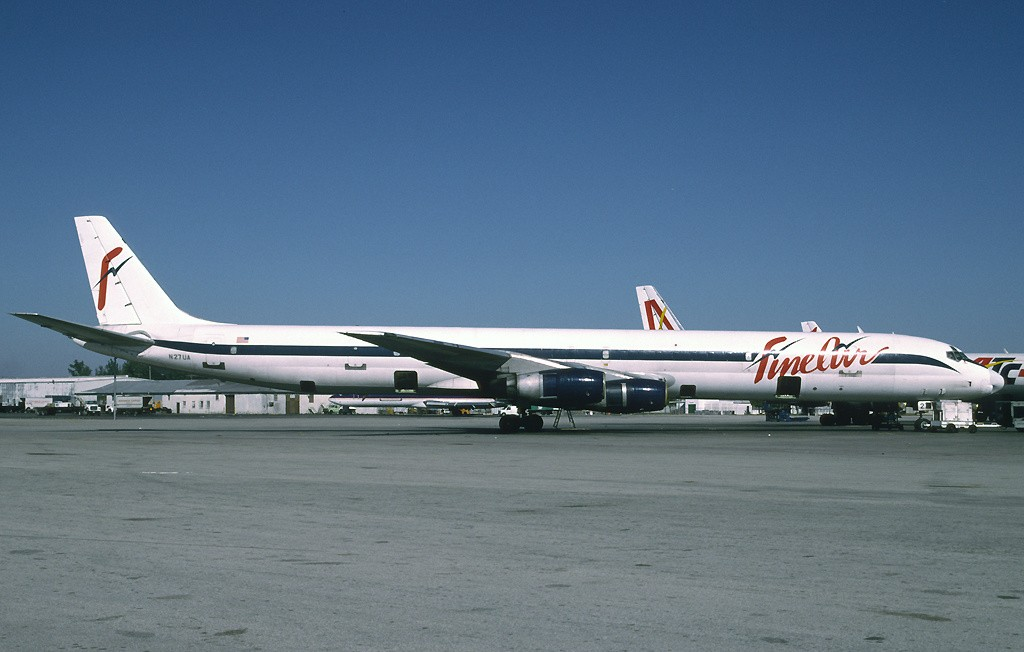
- N27UA, the aircraft involved in the accident, pictured in 1996
- Aircraft type: Douglas DC-8-61F
- Operator: Fine Air
- IATA flight No.: FB101
- ICAO flight No.: FBF101
- Call sign: FINE AIR 101
- Registration: N27UA
- Flight origin: Miami International Airport, Miami, Florida, United States
- Destination: Las Américas International Airport, Punta Caucedo, Dominican Republic
- Occupants: 4
- Passengers: 1
- Crew: 3
- Fatalities: 4
- Survivors: 0

Ground casualties
- Ground fatalities: 1
- Ground injuries: 2

Fine Air Flight 101 was a scheduled cargo flight from Miami International Airport in Florida, United States, to Las Américas International Airport in Punta Caucedo, Dominican Republic, operated by a Douglas DC-8-61F, registration N27UA, that crashed almost immediately after take-off on August 7, 1997, when it failed to gain altitude. All four people on board and one person on the ground died in the mid-day Thursday crash.

== Aircraft ==
The aircraft involved in the accident was a 29-year-old McDonnell Douglas DC-8-61F, manufacturer's serial number 45942, line number 349, registration N27UA, operated by Fine Air, with 48,825 total airframe hours and 41,688 cycles.

== Crew and passenger ==
There were three crew members and a security guard on board. The captain, 42-year-old Dale Patrick "Pat" Thompson, had been with Fine Air since 1993. He had a total of 12,154 hours of flying time, including 2,522 hours as a DC-8 captain at Fine Air. The first officer, Steven Petrosky, aged 26, hired on August 15, 1994, had a total of 2,641 hours of flying time, of which 1,592 hours were with Fine Air in DC-8s and logged 614 hours as first officer and 978 hours as a flight engineer, all in the DC-8. The flight engineer, Glen Millington, aged 35, had joined Fine Air in 1996. He had logged a total of 1,570 flight hours, including 683 hours as a DC-8 flight engineer at Fine Air. The security guard on board was 32-year-old Enrique Soto.

== Accident ==
The aircraft, bound for Santo Domingo, lost control shortly after takeoff from runway 27R (now 26R). The nose quickly pitched up into a stall, briefly recovered, but then entered another stall, impacting the ground and sliding at 12:36 pm EDT.

Exiting the west end of the airport property, the DC-8 missed the auto transport loading facility at the south end of the Miami City Rail Yard just north of the end of the runway, and also busy cargo operations facilities along the very busy NW 25th Street feeder to the airport's cargo area just to the south of the end of the runway. The aircraft barely missed two factories, a commercial building, and the Budweiser Distribution Center in unincorporated Dade County (Note: In November 1997, three months after the crash, the county was renamed as its current 'Miami-Dade County'.), Florida, between the populated residential suburbs of Miami Springs and Doral. It skidded across an open field and onto NW 72nd Ave, a roadway that is typically full of traffic during the weekday lunch hour and was full at the time of the accident, though the portion Flight 101 struck had red lights at both intersections. The plane's wreckage skidded quickly across the roadway and onto the parking lot of a commercial mini-mall across the street from the empty field; it hit 26 cars in the lot, and a major fire followed. At that time, the mini-mall was a hub of computer parts distributors specializing in South American commerce.

The plane's wreckage fell four feet (1.2 m) short of the entrances to three shops, missing two occupied cars and a truck that was waiting for the traffic signal at the intersection of NW 31st Street and NW 72nd Avenue, less than ninety feet (27 m) away. Inside one of the cars in the parking lot sat 34-year-old Renato Alvarez, who had just arrived back at his shop in the mini-mall after picking up lunch for his wife and himself. He was unable to escape the vehicle and was caught up in the fireball that engulfed the multi-lane avenue, field, and parking lot.

Five people were killed in total: the three aircrew members, a company security guard on the flight, and the man in the parking lot. In the minutes following the crash, police were alerted to a fire at NW 72nd Ave, only to discover it was a plane crash. For nearly 45 minutes, mixed reports claimed the plane was a passenger flight, but within the hour the control tower at MIA confirmed it was Fine Air Cargo Flight 101. FAA Security Special Agents working out of an office on airport property (at that time) responded to the scene and simultaneously to the Fine Air Cargo offices, where they took possession of the flight documentation. Some relevant documentation was recovered from garbage receptacles, causing a criminal investigation to be opened and ultimately leading to charges including destruction and covering-up of evidence. Fine Air and their ground-handling agent Aeromar Líneas Aéreas Dominicanas pleaded guilty to several of the charges and were fined approximately $5 million.

== Investigation ==
The National Transportation Safety Board (NTSB) found that the airplane's center of gravity was near or even aft of the airplane's limit and the airplane's trim was mis-set. Both resulted from cargo loading irregularities. The severity of the control problem could not be determined because of uncertainty about the cargo weight distribution. It would have required exceptional skills and reactions that could not be expected from the pilots.

The NTSB found that "a significant shift of cargo rearward at or before rotation did not occur and was not the cause of the initial extreme pitch up at rotation." Cargo compression or shifting may have occurred later.

Ground crew interviews found that the flight was routinely full of pallets and the cargo locks were rarely engaged in some opinions, and it was further stated this was because they were thought to be irrelevant if the pallets could not move. Pallets are held by rails at the sides from moving in an upward direction, but only the retractable end locks can stop the forward-and-aft movement. Also, the aircraft was approximately six thousand pounds (2,700 kg) overloaded, although, given the pallet weighing process, this was believed to be more common than thought beforehand.

=== NTSB determination ===
The NTSB released the final accident report on June 16, 1998. The "probable cause" reads:

The National Transportation Safety Board determines that the probable cause of the accident, which resulted from the airplane being misloaded to produce a more aft center of gravity and a correspondingly incorrect stabilizer trim setting that precipitated an extreme pitch-up at rotation, was (1) the failure of Fine Air to exercise operational control over the cargo loading process; and (2) the failure of Aeromar to load the airplane as specified by Fine Air. Contributing to the accident was the failure of the Federal Aviation Administration (FAA) to adequately monitor Fine Air's operational control responsibilities for cargo loading and the failure of the FAA to ensure that known cargo-related deficiencies were corrected at Fine Air.

== In popular culture ==
The crash of Fine Air Flight 101 is featured in the 5th episode of Season 19 of Mayday (Air Crash Investigation). The episode is titled "Deadly Pitch".

== See also ==
- Emery Worldwide Airlines Flight 17- a similar crash caused by detachment of an elevator control rod
- National Airlines Flight 102- a similar crash caused by cargo shifting
- 21 Air Flight 7598- a similar crash at Miami International Airport which is under investigation as of Sep 13, 2026
