= Load shifting =

Cargo shift in a vehicle

Load shifting is a dangerous phenomenon in water, air, and ground transportation where cargo shifts in a cargo vehicle. This causes the vehicle to tilt, which causes even more movement of the cargo, and further tilting, thereby creating a positive feedback loop. If not corrected, this will lead to severe tipping or even capsizing. Such a dangerous occurrence is prevented by active load management, avoiding high sea conditions for ships, and proper container/bulkhead design.

On a cargo airplane, a professional loadmaster is necessary to prevent load shifting. If cargo is not adequately secured, it can move during flight, and move the center of gravity outside of its safe operating limits, which will cause the aircraft to become uncontrollable or stall, and crash.

== Ships ==
Ships are used to transport a majority of today's goods which is approximately 90% of all non bulk cargo. Ensuring that loads do not dangerously shift is part of boat design and operation.

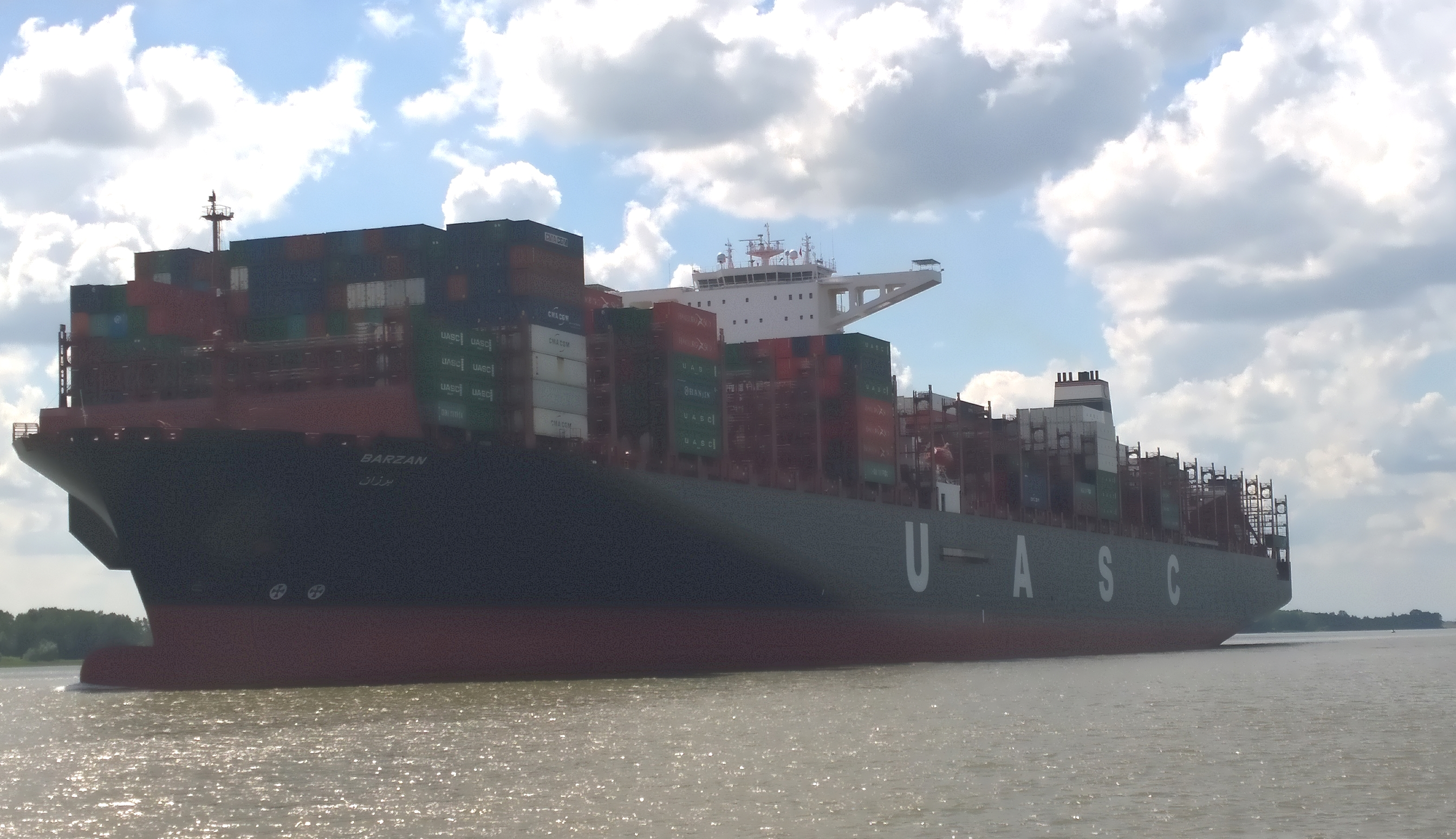
Container ship Barzan on its maiden voyage en route to the Port of Hamburg on June 29, 2015

=== Design ===
There are many types of loads that vessels carry that can shift, including containers, bulk cargo, liquids, and fluids that leak into bilges.

==== Shipping containers ====
Container ships are not particularly susceptible to dangerous load shifting. Most loads are in containers measuring 1/2, 1 or 2 TEUs, which are locked to each other and to the deck with twist-locks, and occasionally reinforced with steel cables. Containers generally only create an issue with the stability of the vessel when they break free. For example, if many of the containers break free and are hanging over the side, shifting the center of mass, most ships will cut the containers loose and add extra ballast water to compensate. Objects shifting inside their containers is not dangerous to the overall ship since the objects can only shift a short distance within their container, and the shift in one or a few containers is insignificant compared to the overall mass of the entire ship and its cargo.

==== Bulk cargo ====
Just like fluids, bulk cargo can and will shift if a ship rolls enough. Shifting loads of bulk cargo can be very dangerous. In order to eliminate this threat, most ships that carry bulk tend to be lower in the water and only carry cargo up to the deck, not above it. Sometimes a honeycomb-like structure will be added to the cargo hold to prevent bulk from shifting enough to endanger the vessel and its crew.

==== Tanks ====
Fluids are the most dangerous cargo for load shifting due to the free surface effect. As a ship rolls, liquids tend to shift toward the lowest part of the vessel. When this happens more weight accumulates on the low side and will cause a more severe roll, potentially leading up to a capsize. To reduce this risk, tanks are built in sections split up by perforated panels. These panels allow slow movement of fluid through them, to keep the fluid level roughly equal between the tanks, but prevent dangerously fast movement of fluids through them, or sloshing.

==== Bilges ====
Similar to tanks, bilges have ridges built into them, and also tend to slope downward toward pockets, where water gathers for pumps. The pumps then treat the water and send it overboard. A difficulty with bilges is that they do not have anti-slosh baffles like tanks, therefore water can move large distances and drastically shift the center of mass of the vessel.

=== Guidelines ===
Many nations have guidelines as to how loads should be handled and stored. For the naval world it is often determined by SOLAS, IMO, and others.

== Planes ==
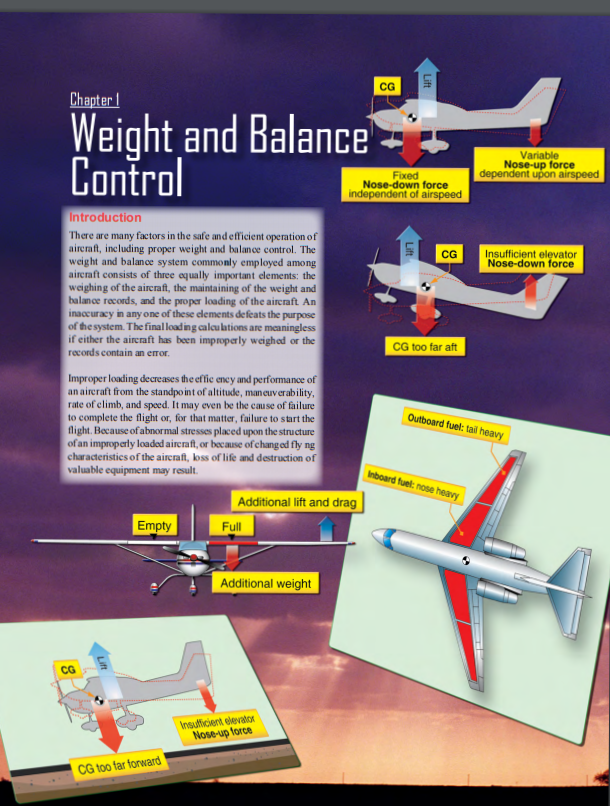
Chapter 1 of Weight and Balance Handbook (FAA-H-8083-1B), an FAA manual used to show how loading an aircraft changes center of mass.

=== Design ===
Cargo planes are designed to carry large loads long distances at high speed. In order to stay stable the center of gravity must be kept within safe operating limits. If loads break free or shift, this will move the center of gravity, causing the plane to be more difficult to control, or even causing a crash. Examples of crashes caused by load shift include National Airlines Flight 102 in 2013, and the 1981 Pushkin Tu-104 crash.

=== Loading ===
Similar to shipping many countries have rules for loading aircraft. There are no worldwide regulations but many are similar. The US Federal Aviation Administration publishes specific guidelines on loading light aircraft, single-engine aircraft, multi-engine aircraft, commuter and large aircraft, and helicopters.
