= List of accidents and incidents involving the Boeing 747 =

As of November 2026, a total of 65 Boeing 747 aircraft, or just above 4% of the total number of 747 built, have been involved in accidents and incidents resulting in a hull loss, meaning that the aircraft was either destroyed or damaged beyond economical repair since the type was first flown commercially in 1970. Of the 65 Boeing 747 aircraft losses, 32 resulted in no loss of life; in one, a hostage was murdered; and in one, a terrorist died.

Some of the aircraft that were declared damaged beyond economical repair were older 747s that sustained relatively minor damage. If these planes had been newer, repairing them might have been economically viable. This is becoming less common with the 747's increasing obsolescence as a passenger aircraft.

Some 747s have been involved in accidents resulting in the highest death toll of any civil aviation accident, the highest death toll of any single airplane accident, and the highest death toll of a midair collision. As with most airliner accidents, the causes of these incidents involved a confluence of multiple factors that rarely could be ascribed to flaws with the 747's design or its flying characteristics.

== 1970s ==
- Pan Am Flight 93 was the first hull loss of a 747 (747-121), the result of terrorism after it was hijacked by the Popular Front for the Liberation of Palestine. On September 6, 1970, a new Pan Am aircraft flying from Amsterdam to New York City was hijacked and flown first to Beirut, then to Cairo. Shortly after the occupants were evacuated from the aircraft after arriving at Cairo, it was blown up.
- On July 30, 1971, Pan Am Flight 845, a Boeing 747-121, struck the approach lighting system at the departure end of runway 1R at San Francisco International Airport during takeoff, injuring 2 of the 218 occupants. The cause of the incident was determined to be the pilot's use of speeds for a closed runway and not re computing new takeoff reference speeds when they used another runway.
- On February 22, 1972, Lufthansa Flight 649, a Boeing 747-230B, was hijacked by five passengers who demanded US$5 million. After landing at Aden International Airport, the hijackers released all women and children among the passengers, as well as one female flight attendant. The next day, once the ransom were paid, they allowed all male passengers to leave. In the evening all remaining on board were released, and the hijackers surrendered. All 192 occupants survived.
- On July 2, 1972, Pan Am Flight 841, a Boeing 747-121, was hijacked by a 24-year-old South Vietnamese native named Nguyễn Thái Bình. After landing at Tan Son Nhut Airport, the captain and passengers overcame and killed the lone hijacker - the sole fatality of the 152 occupants, ending the hijack.
- Japan Airlines Flight 404, the second 747 hull loss was very similar to the first. The aircraft was hijacked on a flight from Amsterdam to Anchorage, Alaska, on July 20, 1973, by the Popular Front for the Liberation of Palestine working with the Japanese Red Army. It flew to Dubai, then Damascus, before ending its journey at Benghazi. The occupants were released and the aircraft was blown up. One of the hijackers died.
- On November 25, 1973, KLM Flight 861, a Boeing 747-206B, was hijacked by three passengers claiming to be members of Arab Youth Organisation. After multiple stopovers, the hijackers surrendered in Dubai, and none of the 264 occupants died.
- Lufthansa Flight 540 was the first fatal crash of a 747. On 20 November 1974, stalled and crashed moments after takeoff from Nairobi, with 59 deaths and 98 survivors. The cause was an error by the flight engineer who did not turn on the pneumatic system which operates the leading edge slats. The crew then initiating a take-off with the leading edge slats retracted. This resulted in the aircraft becoming airborne in a partially stalled condition which the pilots did not identify in the short time available to recover in combination with the lack of a slat warning system.
- On February 3, 1975, 144 people felt ill aboard a Japan Air Lines Boeing 747-246B. The plane performed an emergency landing at Copenhagen Airport. No one died, but 30 of the 364 occupants were hospitalized.
- Air France Flight 193, a 747-128 (N28888) operating the sector between Bombay (now Mumbai) and Tel Aviv to Paris-Charles de Gaulle Airport, was destroyed by fire, June 12, 1975, on the ground at Bombay’s (now Mumbai’s) Santa Cruz Airport, following an aborted take-off, with no fatalities.
- On May 9, 1976, Imperial Iranian Air Force Flight ULF48, a 747 freighter, crashed near Madrid due to the structural failure of its left wing in flight, killing the 17 people on board. The accident investigation determined that a lightning strike caused an explosion in a fuel tank in the wing, leading to flutter and the separation of the wing.
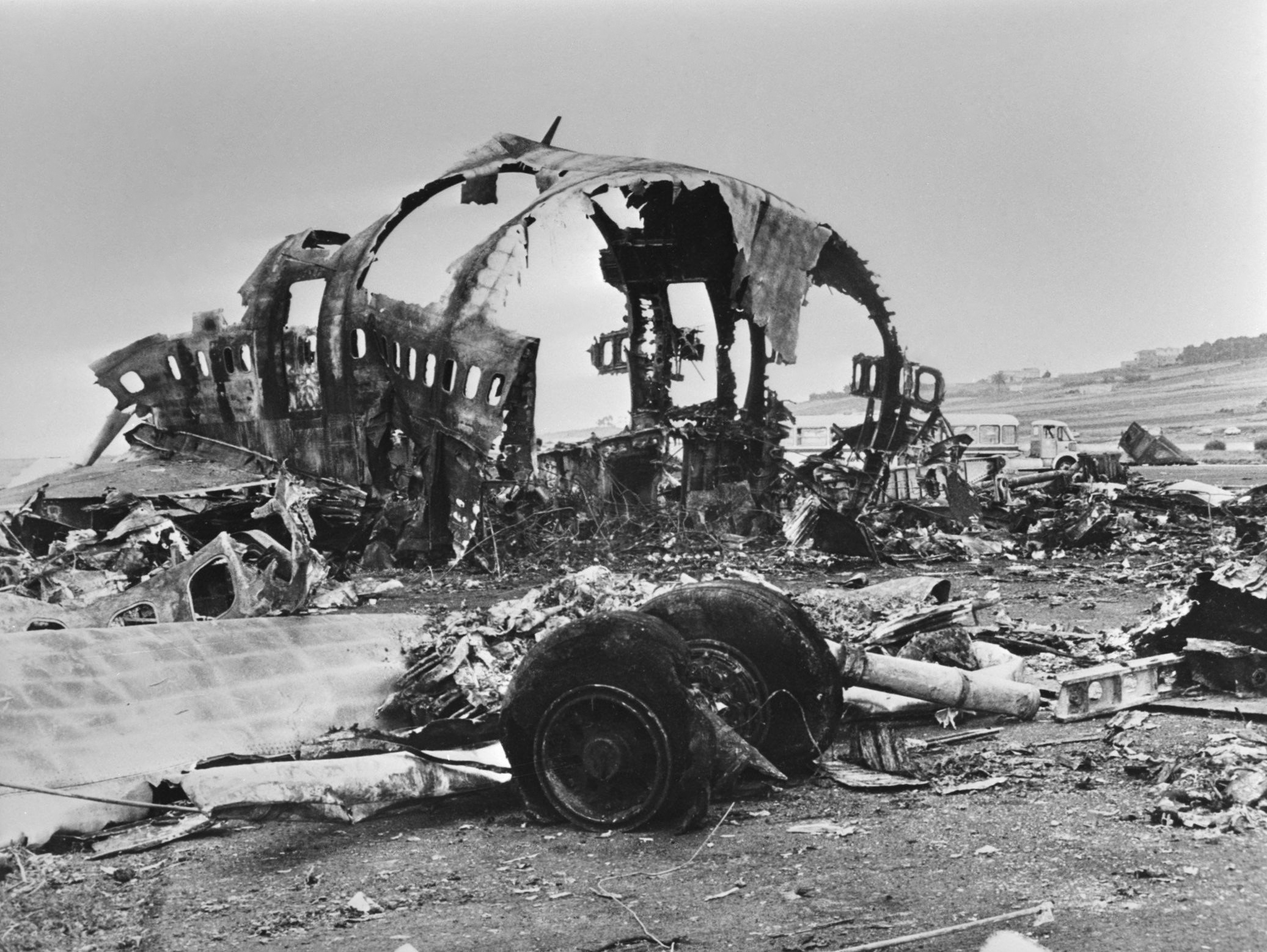
  The wreckage of KLM Flight 4805
- On March 27, 1977, the deadliest aviation accident in history occurred when KLM Flight 4805 collided on the runway with Pan Am 1736 in heavy fog at Tenerife Airport, resulting in 583 fatalities. Both aircraft were 747s. The 61 survivors were all from the Pan Am 747. The Pan Am aircraft was the first 747 to enter commercial service.
- Air India Flight 855 crashed into the sea off the coast of Mumbai (formerly Bombay) on New Year's Day, 1978. All 213 passengers and crew died. The cause was lack of situational awareness on the captain's part after executing a banked turn.
- On June 2, 1978, Japan Air Lines Flight 115, a Boeing 747SR-46, experienced a severe tailstrike when the pilots attempted to flare after a bounced landing at Itami Airport. Of the 394 people on board, 25 sustained injuries, 23 minor and 2 serious. Seven years later, the repaired pressure bulkhead failed and caused a crash on the same aircraft due to a faulty repair procedure.
- On August 9, 1978, Olympic Airways Flight 411, a Boeing 747-284B, flew dangerously low over downtown Athens, with the plane unable to ascend further and coming close to stalling due to engine failure. The plane returned to Ellinikon International Airport safely with no fatalities of the 418 occupants. The investigation concluded that the incident was caused by inadvertent shut off of the water injection pumps by the flight crew.

== 1980s ==
- On February 7, 1980, China Airlines Flight 009, a Boeing 747-209B, suffered a tail strike while landing at Kai Tak Airport. No one was injured. Due to improper repairs, 22 years later, it was involved in a fatal accident.
- On November 19, 1980, Korean Air Lines Flight 015, operating a flight from Los Angeles to Seoul, with a refueling stop at Anchorage, Alaska, was damaged beyond repair on landing. Of the 226 occupants, 15 passengers and crew died.
- On June 24, 1982, British Airways Flight 009, a Boeing 747-200B, experienced a quadruple-engine failure while passing through volcano ash. The crew had difficulty in seeing through the windscreen due to the St. Elmo's fire effect and the sand blasting of the windshield by ash. The crew managed to start one engine at 13,000 ft (4,000 m) and then another 2 engines, and then completed a 3 engine landing. They managed to land the airplane at Halim Perdanakusuma International Airport with all 263 occupants. Investigation revealed that the blockage by volcanic ash was the major cause.
- On August 11, 1982, Pan Am Flight 830, a Boeing 747-121, was bombed while cruising at 36,000 feet, northwest of Hawaii. The plane landed safely, all but one of the 285 occupants survived.
- On August 4, 1983, Pan Am Flight 73, a 747-100, struck a Visual Approach Slope Indicator light installation and its concrete base when landing at Karachi International Airport, causing the nose gear to collapse backwards and to the left, resulting in total destruction of the VASI light installation and damage to the forward cargo hold, the floor of the first class section, and the stairway leading to the upper deck. (Not to be confused with a later hijacking in 1986 of a Pan Am Flight 73.)
- On September 1, 1983, Korean Air Lines Flight 007, a 747-200B from New York City to Seoul via Anchorage, was shot down by the Soviet Air Force just west of Sakhalin Island while flying through prohibited airspace. All 269 passengers and crew were killed.
- On November 27, 1983, Avianca Flight 011, a 747-200M flying from Paris to Bogotá via Madrid, crashed into a mountainside due to a navigational error while maneuvering to land at Madrid Barajas International Airport, killing 181 of the 192 on board.
- On February 19, 1985, China Airlines Flight 006, a Boeing 747SP-09 with 274 passengers and crew on board, enroute from Taipei to Los Angeles suffered an engine failure on No. 4 engine while cruising at 41,000 ft (12,000 m). Slowly decreasing airspeed resulted in a stall and loss of control and a 31,500 ft (10,000 m) plunge due to crew preoccupation with the malfunction and failure to monitor flight instruments and airspeed. Control was regained at 9,500 ft (3,000 m). After an emergency was declared, the plane diverted to San Francisco International Airport with 24 injuries, 2 of which were serious. The captain's reliance on autopilot and distraction were blamed for the incident.
- On March 16, 1985, a UTA 747-300 (registration F-GDUA) was destroyed on the ground at Paris CDG when a fire was accidentally started while the aircraft's cabin was being cleaned.
- On June 23, 1985, Sikh extremists caused a bomb to explode on Air India Flight 182, a 747-200B en route from Montreal to New Delhi, the explosion brought down the aircraft off the southwest coast of Ireland, killing all 329 on board. Until the September 11 attacks of 2001, the Air India bombing was the single deadliest terrorist attack involving aircraft. It remains the "worst mass murder in Canadian history."
- On August 12, 1985, Japan Air Lines Flight 123 crashed when the rear pressure bulkhead of a 747SR flying from Tokyo to Osaka failed at cruising altitude, severing the aircraft's vertical stabilizer. The pilots kept it in the air for 32 minutes, but it eventually struck Mount Takamagahara and crashed. Of the 524 people on board, only four passengers survived, making it the deadliest-ever single-aircraft accident. The accident was caused by Boeing improperly repairing the tail strike suffered by the same aircraft seven years earlier.
- On December 2, 1985, Air France Flight 091 overshot the runway during a landing at Rio de Janeiro-Galeão International Airport, Brazil. No fatalities occurred, but the aircraft was damaged beyond repair.
- On May 3, 1986, China Airlines Flight 334, a Boeing 747-2R7F, was hijacked by a former military U-2 pilot, and also the captain of the flight. Although conflicting stories were given, it is confirmed that the two crew members had fought against the hijacker. The plane landed at Guangzhou Baiyun International Airport, with all 3 survived. The incident has had a major impact on the relationship between Taiwan and China. Moreover, the same plane would be involved in a fatal plane crash five years later.
- On September 5, 1986, Pan Am Flight 73, a Boeing 747-121, was hijacked by four Palestinian terrorists of Abu Nidal Organization. They demanded for pilots to pick up prisoners. After long negotiations, they started being impatient, and then started shooting the passengers. When the plane ran out of power, the hijackers began indiscriminately killing the occupants that were still on the plane. The hijack ended when the Special Service Group stormed the plane, 21 of the 379 occupants were killed.
- On November 17, 1986, Japan Air Lines Cargo Flight 1628, a Boeing 747-246F, allegedly saw an unidentified object flying close to the plane. The captain reported that the objects followed the plane for 640 kilometres (400 miles), but aircraft nearby didn't find anything unusual. Flight 1628 landed in Anchorage with no problems with the three crew members.
- On May 19, 1987, Air New Zealand Flight 24, a Boeing 747-219B, was hijacked by a 37-year-old man named Ahmjed Ali. He disembarked most people on board, leaving the captain, the first officer, and the flight engineer. Distracted with the radio, the hijacker was overpowered by the crew. The hijack ends with no fatalities among the 129 occupants.
- On November 28, 1987, South African Airways Flight 295, a 747-200BSCD "Combi" en route from Taipei to Johannesburg, crashed into the ocean off Mauritius after a fire broke out in the rear cargo hold, damaging vital control systems. All 159 people on board died.
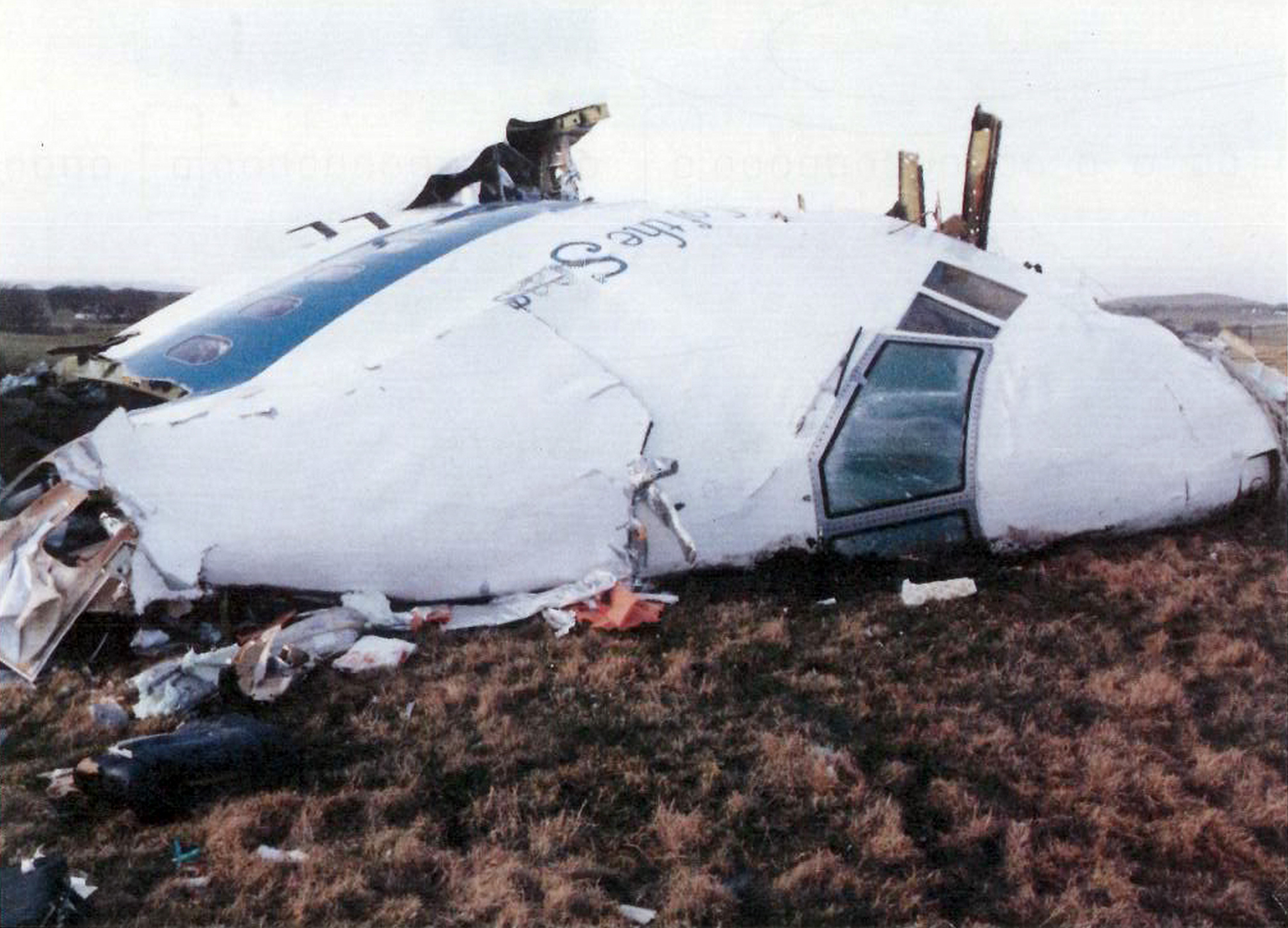
  The wreckage of Pan Am Flight 103
- On April 5, 1988, Kuwait Airways Flight 422, a Boeing 747-269B, was hijacked by four Lebanese militants who diverted the Boeing 747. Seeking the release of prisoners in Kuwait, they killed two passengers before ending the standoff in Algiers, where survivors were freed and the hijackers surrendered fifteen days after. All but two of the 112 occupants survived.
- On December 21, 1988, Pan Am Flight 103, a 747-100, disintegrated in midair after a bomb in the luggage hold exploded; the wings and part of the fuselage attached to it, with their tanks full of fuel, crashed on Lockerbie, Scotland. All 259 people on board and 11 people in Lockerbie died. A Libyan national was eventually convicted at a Scottish court sitting in the Netherlands of murder in connection with the bombing.
- On February 19, 1989, Flying Tiger Line Flight 066, a 747-200F, was flying using a non-directional beacon approach to Runway 33 at Sultan Abdul Aziz Shah Airport, Kuala Lumpur, when the aircraft hit a hillside 600 ft (180 m) above sea level, resulting in the deaths of all four people on board.
- On February 24, 1989, United Airlines Flight 811, a Boeing 747-122, experienced a cargo-door failure in flight shortly after leaving Honolulu. This results in an explosive decompression which blew out several rows of seats, ejecting and killing nine passengers. The aircraft returned to Honolulu and landed without further incident.
- On December 15, 1989, KLM Flight 867, a Boeing 747-406M, experienced a quadruple-engine failure while flying through a thick cloud of volcano ash. After descending more than 14,000 ft (4250 m), the crew restarted the engines and safely landed the plane at Anchorage International Airport with no loss of life among the 245 occupants.

== 1990s ==
- On May 7, 1990, Air India Flight 132 touched down at Delhi-Indira Gandhi International Airport after a flight from London-Heathrow. On application of reverse thrust, a failure of the number-one engine pylon-to-wing attachment caused this engine to tilt nose down. Hot exhaust gasses caused a fire on the left wing. The aircraft, VT-EBO, was damaged beyond repair.
- On August 2, 1990, British Airways Flight 149 was a 747-100 flying from London Heathrow Airport to Sultan Abdul Aziz Shah Airport, Kuala Lumpur, with stopovers in Kuwait International Airport and Madras International Airport (now Chennai). The aircraft landed in Kuwait City a day prior, four hours after the Gulf War broke out. All 385 passengers and crew were taken hostage by Iraqi forces; one was executed, but the others were released. The aircraft was subsequently blown up.
- On December 29, 1991, China Airlines Flight 358, a 747-200F, crashed shortly after takeoff from Chiang Kai-shek International Airport in Taipei, Taiwan, killing all five crewmembers, when the number-three and number-four engines (both starboard engines) detached from the aircraft.
- On February 14, 1992, food contaminated with cholera was distributed to the passengers on Aerolineas Argentinas Flight 386, a Boeing 747-200B, killing a passenger days later among the 356 on board that day. The incident led to improvements in aircraft disinfection procedures.
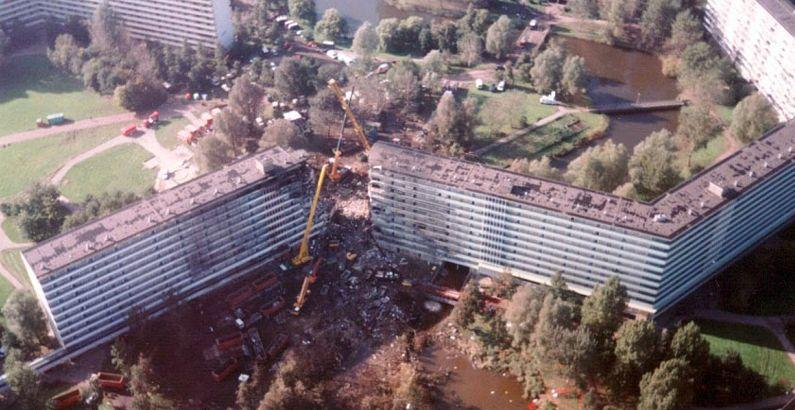
  The aftermath of the building after Flight 1862 crashed into it
- On October 4, 1992, El Al Flight 1862, a 747-200F, crashed shortly after takeoff from Amsterdam Schiphol Airport after the right-side engines both fell off, due to metal fatigue, and damaged the right wing, killing all three crew members and the single passenger on board, as well as 43 people on the ground.
- On March 31, 1993, Japan Air Lines Cargo Flight 46E, a Boeing 747-121F, was a scheduled cargo flight operated by Evergreen International Airlines, on behalf of Japan Air Lines. Taking off from Anchorage International Airport, Anchorage, Alaska, at 2,000 feet, the airplane experienced an uncommanded left bank of approximately 50 degrees due to No. 2 engine detachment. The plane landed back safely with no fatalities among the 5 crew. Investigation concluded that the lateral separation of the No. 2 engine pylon was possibly due to an encounter with severe or possibly extreme turbulence and the presence of the fatigue crack.
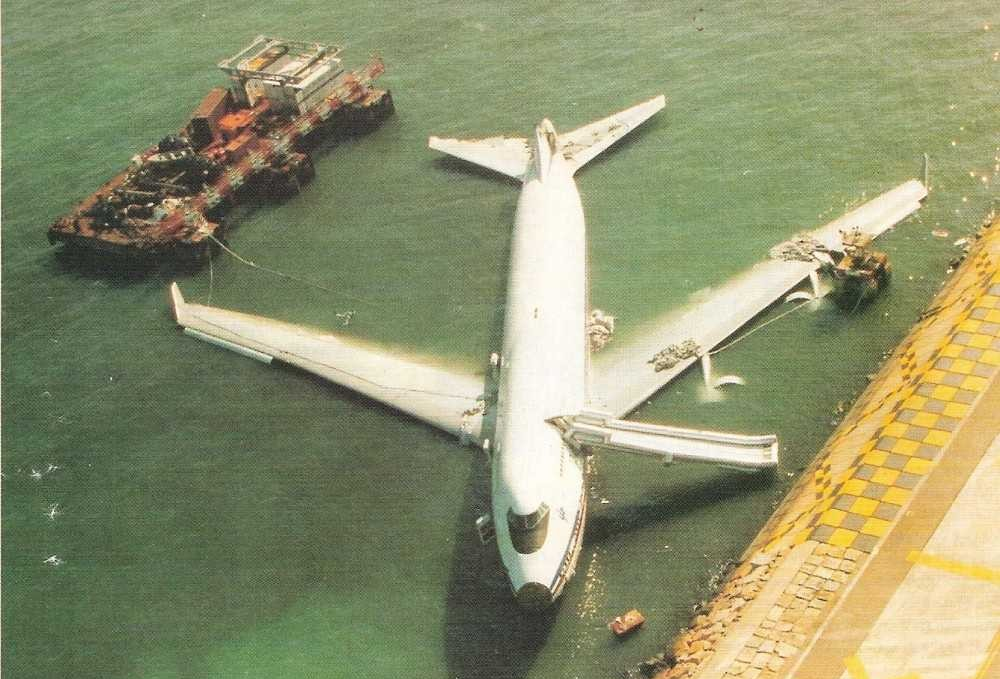
  China Airlines Flight 605 after overrunning the runway
- On November 4, 1993, China Airlines Flight 605, a brand-new 747-400 from Taipei to Hong Kong Kai Tak Airport, landed 2,000 feet (610 m) past the threshold on runway 13, with insufficient braking power. Unable to stop before the end of the runway, the captain steered the aircraft into Victoria Harbour. All passengers were evacuated via inflatable life rafts. The vertical fin was blown off with explosives, as it disrupted airport operations. The aircraft was recovered from the harbor days later and was written off.
- On December 11, 1994, Philippine Airlines Flight 434, a Boeing 747-283B, was bombed over Okinawa, Japan as a test for the infamous Bojinka plot. The crew succeeded in landing the damaged plane at Naha Airport one hour after the bombing. among the 293 occupants, 1 died and 292 survived.
- On June 21, 1995, All Nippon Airways Flight 857, a Boeing 747SR-81, was hijacked by a man in demand of the release of Aum Shinrikyo leader Shoko Asahara. After landing at Hakodate Airport, passengers through cell phones reported that he was acting alone and refused to have any direct interaction outside the aircraft. The following day, Tokyo and Hokkaido police stormed into the aircraft, arresting the hijacker. No fatalities occurred among the 365 on board.
- On December 20, 1995, Tower Air Flight 41, a 747-100, veered off the left side of runway 4L during an attempted takeoff at John F. Kennedy International Airport (JFK), New York City, New York. The flight was a regularly scheduled passenger/cargo flight conducted under the provisions of Title 14 Code of Federal Regulations Part 121. Of the 468 persons aboard (451 passengers, 12 cabin crew members, three flight crew members, and two cockpit jumpseat occupants), 24 passengers sustained minor injuries, and a flight attendant received serious injuries. The aircraft was damaged beyond repair.
- On July 17, 1996, TWA Flight 800, a 747-100 bound for Charles de Gaulle Airport in Paris, exploded during its climb from JFK in New York, killing all 230 people aboard. A spark from a wire in the center fuel tank is believed to have caused the explosion. Changes in fuel tank management were adopted after the accident.

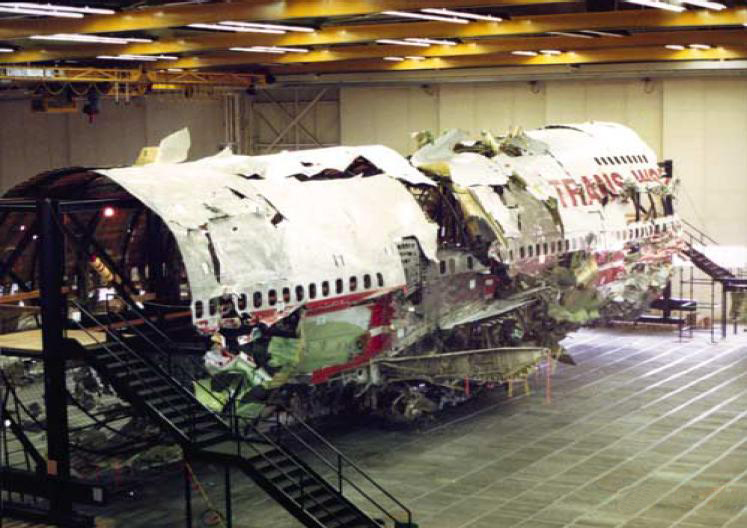
The reconstructed wreckage of TWA Flight 800

- On November 12, 1996, Saudi Arabian Airlines Flight 763, a 747-100B, collided with Kazakhstan Airlines Flight 1907, an Ilyushin Il-76, in midair over Charkhi Dadri in Haryana, India, resulting in the deaths of all 349 occupants of both aircraft, the deadliest midair collision in history.
- On August 6, 1997, Korean Air Flight 801, a 747-300, crashed into a hillside while on approach to Antonio B. Won Pat International Airport on the island of Guam due to pilot error. Of the 254 people on board, 25 survived.
- On December 28, 1997, United Airlines Flight 826, a Boeing 747-122, encountered severe clear-air turbulence that caused an in-flight upset while cruising at 31,000 feet over the Pacific Ocean. The plane landed safely at New Tokyo International Airport, but a 32-year-old Japanese passenger died, who is also the sole fatality among the 393 occupants.
- On June 28, 1998, United Airlines Flight 863, a Boeing 747-422, was forced to shut down one of its right-wing engines and nearly collided with San Bruno Mountain while recovering from the engine failure. The aircraft was able to dump fuel over the Pacific Ocean and return to San Francisco for an overweight landing at San Francisco International Airport with no fatalities among the 307 occupants. Aftermath, United Airlines revised its training protocols after the incident by implementing much more rigorous standards, which ultimately became industry-wide standards.
- On August 5, 1998, Korean Air Flight 8702, a 747-400, overshot a runway while landing. The fuselage split and 25 people were injured.
- On October 5, 1998, a 747SP-44, owned by South African Airways and leased to LAM Mozambique Airlines, registered as ZS-SPF, experienced an engine failure shortly after takeoff on Engine 3, the inner right hand engine. As a result, debris flew off from that engine to Engine 4, the outer right hand engine, and parts of the wing, damaging it and causing a fire.
- On March 5, 1999, a 747-2B3F (F-GPAN) from Paris Charles de Gaulle Airport to Madras International Airport, Madras via Karachi and Bangalore HAL Airport was destroyed by fire after landing with the nose gear up. No fatalities occurred.
- On July 23, 1999, All Nippon Airways Flight 61, a Boeing 747-481D, was hijacked by Yūji Nishizawa. After forcing the first officer out of the cockpit, he stabbed the captain and descended to an altitude of 980 feet. The remaining crew managed to subdue the hijacker and performed an emergency landing at Haneda Airport. The captain was the sole fatality among the 517 occupants.
- On September 23, 1999, Qantas Flight 1, a Boeing 747-438, overran the runway at Don Mueang International Airport, Bangkok, Thailand due to pilot error and hydroplaning. All 410 occupants survived and the plane was repaired, continuing until 2012.
- On December 22, 1999, Korean Air Cargo Flight 8509, a 747-200F from London Stansted Airport, crashed shortly after take-off, killing all four crew. The captain of the aircraft had mishandled it due to erroneous indications on his attitude indicator.

== 2000s ==
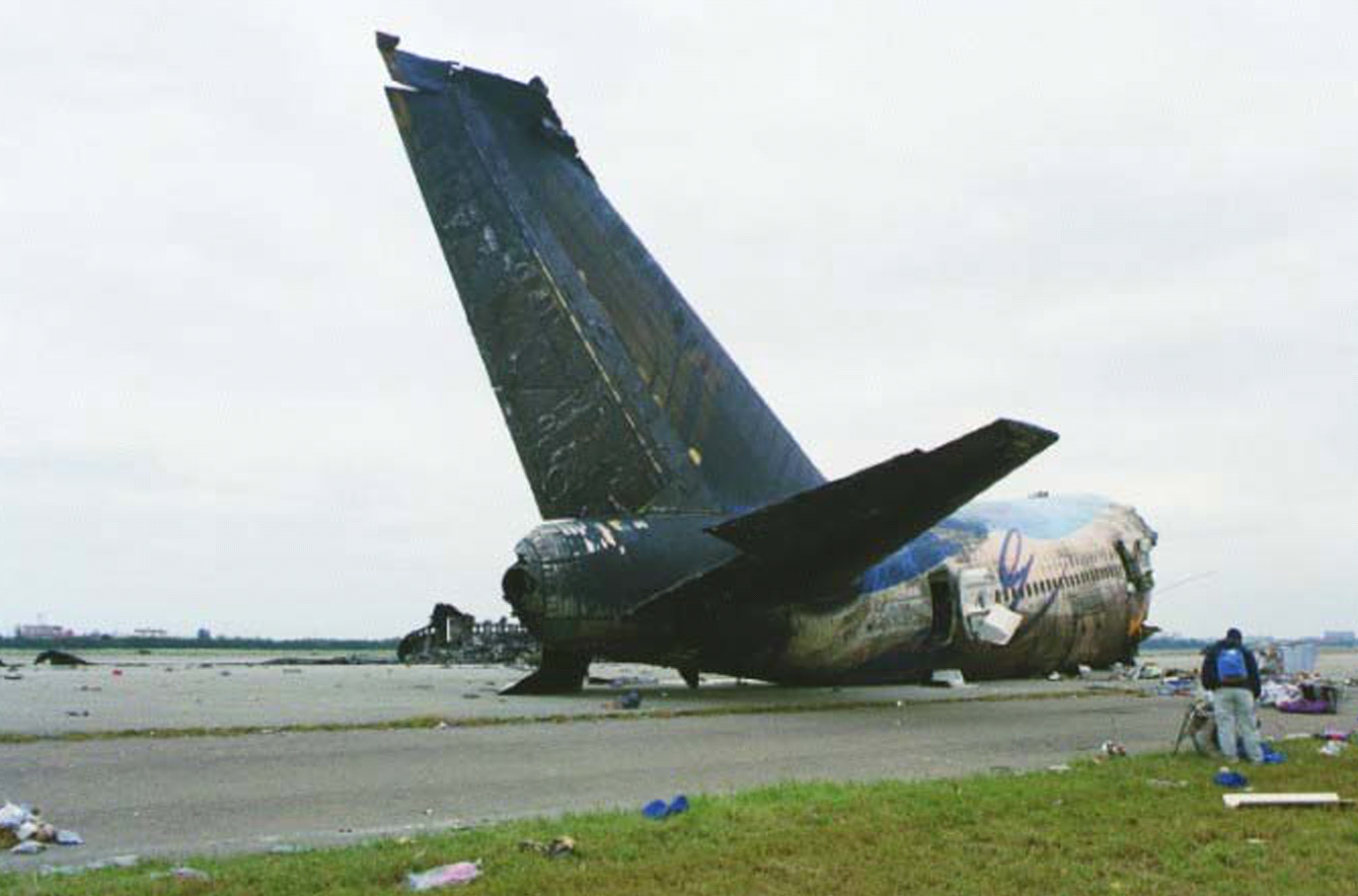
- The tail of Singapore Airlines Flight 006
  On October 31, 2000, Singapore Airlines Flight 006, a 747-400 flying from Singapore to Los Angeles via Taipei, collided with construction equipment while attempting to take off from a closed runway at Taiwan's Chiang Kai-shek International Airport (now Taiwan Taoyuan International Airport), killing 79 passengers and four crew members on board. There were 96 survivors, including all 3 pilots.
- On November 5, 2000, Cameroon Airlines Flight 070, a 747-2H7B (SCD), flying from Douala, Cameroon to Paris, France, overran the runway while attempting to land due to pilot error. All 203 occupants on-board survived.
- On December 29, 2000, British Airways Flight 2069, a Boeing 747-436, an attempt to suicide was made by a mentally ill Kenyan passenger by storming into the cockpit, where only the first officer was there. He stalled the plane at the altitude of 42,000 feet, which made the plane enter a 30,000-feet-per-minute plunge. The captain and two passengers were able to control him and successfully recovered the plane. No one was killed of the 398 occupants.
- On January 31, 2001, Japan Air Lines Flight 907, a Boeing 747-446D, avoided the collision with Flight 958 - a McDonnell Douglas DC-10-40 by using evasive manoeuvres, injuring 100 people on board, but no fatalities among the 427 on board. ATC error was blamed for the incident.
- On August 23, 2001, Saudia Flight 3830, a 747-300, rolled into a drainage ditch at Kuala Lumpur International Airport and toppled forward, causing severe damage to the nose section. Reportedly, the aircraft was being taxied by a ground engineer on the number two and -three engines. When trying to make a turn, the brakes and steering had no effect, and the aircraft continued into the ditch. The auxiliary hydraulic pumps, which actuated brakes and steering, were thought to be switched off.
- On September 11, 2001, during the September 11 attacks, Korean Air Flight 085, a Boeing 747-4B5, misinformed that the plane was hijacked due to the miscommunication between pilots and ATC, which escorted F-15s to shoot down the plane if they disobeyed the ATC instructions. The crew complied and landed safely at Whitehorse International Airport with no injuries nor fatalities among the 215 occupants.
- On November 27, 2001, an MK Airlines 747-200F crashed about 700 m short of the runway near Port Harcourt Airport, Nigeria. Of the 13 on board, one died.
- On May 25, 2002, China Airlines Flight 611, a 747-200B en route to Hong Kong International Airport from Chiang Kai-shek International Airport, broke up in midair 20 minutes after take-off and crashed into the Taiwan Strait, killing all 225 occupants on board. Subsequent investigation determined the cause to be metal fatigue cracking due to an improperly performed repair after a tail strike.
- On October 9, 2002, Northwest Airlines Flight 85, a Boeing 747-451, experienced a lower rudder hardover, giving full left lower rudder, requiring the pilots to use full right upper rudder and right aileron to maintain attitude and course. The flight crew took back control of the aircraft and landed at Ted Stevens Anchorage International Airport, with all 404 occupants survived.
- On March 12, 2003, Singapore Airlines Flight 286, a Boeing 747-412, suffered tailstrike while lifting off from the runway, causing severe damage to the aircraft's tail and damaging the APU, which then triggered the in-flight APU fire warnings. The flight returned to Auckland with no fatalities or serious injuries among the 389 people on board. The cause was later determined to be an error in the pilots' calculations of the aircraft's takeoff weight and reference speeds, which caused the pilots to rotate the aircraft prematurely.
- On November 29, 2003, Hydro Air Cargo Flight 501, a 747-258C, registered as ZS-OOS, landed on an incorrect runway which was closed for maintenance, damaging the aircraft. All nine occupants survived.
- On October 14, 2004, MK Airlines Flight 1602, a 747-200F, crashed while attempting to take off from Halifax Stanfield International Airport, killing all seven on board. The aircraft's take-off weight had been incorrectly calculated, and it was only airborne briefly before stalling at the end of the runway.
- On November 7, 2004, an Air Atlanta Icelandic 747-230F registered as TF-ARR, wet leased to Lufthansa Cargo, overran the runway at Sharjah Airport because of information relayed to the pilots that there was smoke coming out of the engines. The pilots aborted takeoff but it was too late. All four occupants onboard survived.
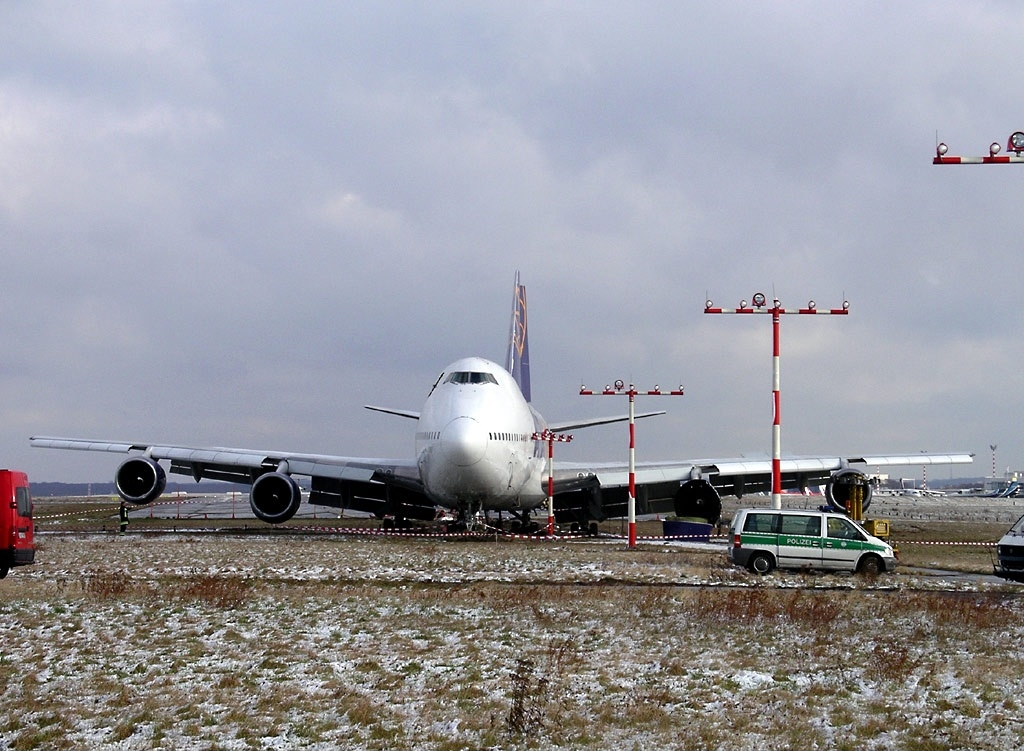
  The damage done to Atlas Air Flight 8995
- On January 24, 2005, Atlas Air Flight 8995, registered as N808MC, overran the 23L runway on landing at Düsseldorf Airport. It collided with ILS aerials, which caused a fire in engines two and three.
- On February 20, 2005, British Airways Flight 268, a Boeing 747-436, experienced an engine failure at No.2 shortly after takeoff, which resulted in compressor stall. However, the pilots decided to continue the flight path instead of dumping 70 tonnes of fuel and land. The plane landed at Manchester Airport with no fatalities among the 370 occupants. The investigation report recommended that British Airways revise its training of crews in three-engine operation fuel management procedures.
- On August 19, 2005, Northwest Airlines Flight 74, a 747-251B registered as N627US, landed with its nose gear retracted due to the pilots believing otherwise. All 340 occupants on-board survived without any injuries.
- On June 7, 2006, Tradewinds Airlines Flight 444, a 747-200F, aborted a take-off from Rionegro/Medellín-José María Córdova Airport and overran the runway. The aircraft was damaged beyond repair and withdrawn from service.
- On February 2, 2008, an Atlas Air 747-2D7B, registered as N527MC, was written off after the cargo broke loose and demolished the aft bulkhead. All occupants survived.
- On March 25, 2008, Saudi Arabian Airlines Flight 810, a 747-357 registered as TF-ARS, caught fire on the right wing immediately after landing due to faulty maintenance. All 325 occupants on-board survived without any serious injuries.

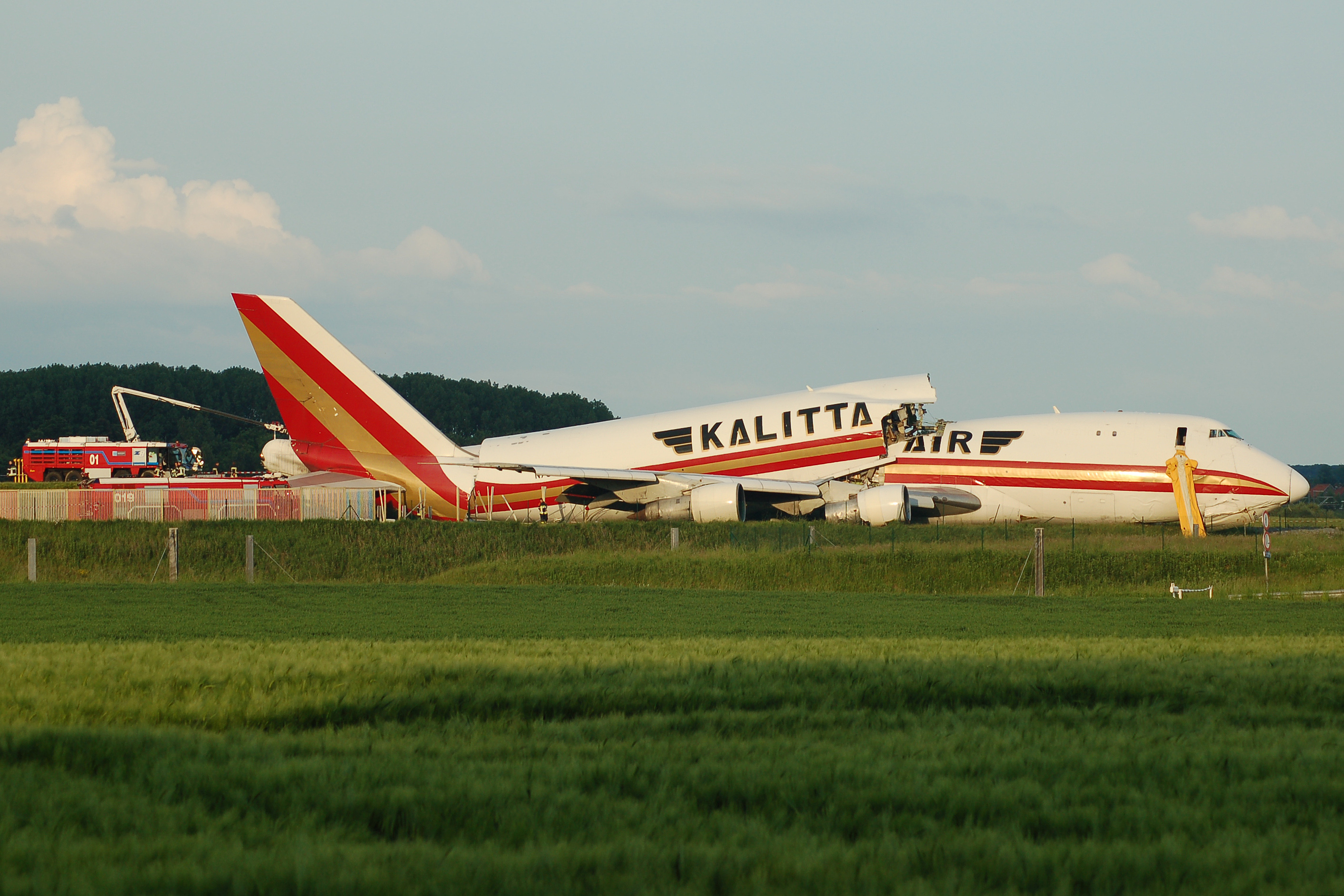
The aftermath of Kalitta Air Flight 207

- On May 25, 2008, Kalitta Air Flight 207, a 747-200F, suffered a bird strike during take-off from Brussels Airport, Belgium. The crew aborted take-off, but the aircraft was unable to stop before it overran the runway and broke up, with minor injuries.
- On July 7, 2008, Centurion Air Cargo Flight 164, a 747-200F, crashed into a farm field near the small village of Madrid, Colombia, shortly after take-off from El Dorado International Airport. The crew had reported an engine fire and were attempting to return to the airport. One of the aircraft's engines hit a farmhouse and killed two people inside it.
- On July 25, 2008, Qantas Flight 30, a Boeing 747-438, experienced in-flight explosions led to a rapid decompression at the cabin. The plane landed at Ninoy Aquino International Airport, with all 365 survived. Investigation found that oxygen tank that ruptured the fuselage just forward of the starboard wing root.
- On August 3, 2008, a 747-481D (Domestic) owned by All Nippon Airways, chemically caught fire during internal cleaning of the aircraft. An inflammable cleaning agent was to blame. Fortunately, no one was on-board the aircraft.
- On October 27, 2008, a 747-228F (SCD) operating for Cargo B Airlines, registered as OO-CBA, suffered a major tail strike incident while attempting to takeoff from Brussel-Zaventem Airport. All six occupants survive without any injuries.
- On September 4, 2009, Air India Flight 829, a 747-437 registered as VT-ESM, suffered an engine fire at Chhatrapati Shivaji Maharaj International Airport, Mumbai, shortly before take-off. None of the 229 occupants were injured or killed, but the aircraft was written off.

== 2010s ==
- On July 17, 2010, Saudi Arabian Airlines Flight 9302, a 747-306M, suffered an uncontained engine failure during take-off. All 22 occupants on-board survived without any injuries.
- On September 3, 2010, UPS Airlines Flight 6, a 747-400F, crashed near Dubai International Airport, killing both crew members. The crash was blamed on lithium-ion batteries in the cargo hold that caught fire.
- On February 16, 2011, Saudi Arabian Airlines Flight 817, a 747-368, was involved in a taxiway excursion and suffered substantial damage. All 277 occupants onboard survived without injury.
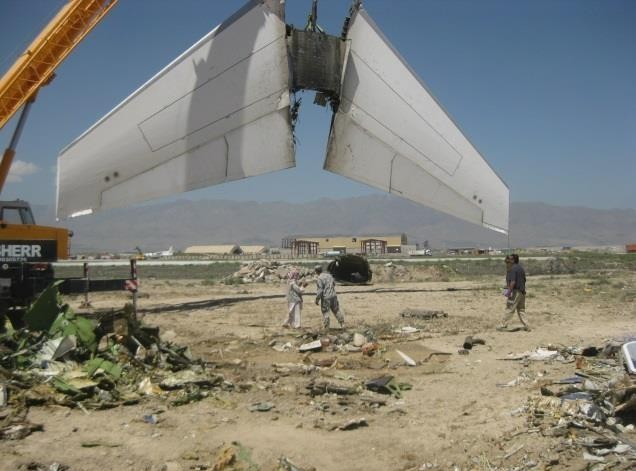
- The wreckage of National Airlines Flight 102
  On July 28, 2011, Asiana Airlines Flight 991, a 747-400F, caught fire and crashed in the sea near Jeju Island, killing both crew members.
- On April 29, 2013, National Airlines Flight 102, 747-400BCF, stalled and crashed shortly after taking off from Bagram Airfield in Bagram, killing all seven crew members.
- On December 4, 2013, a leased 747-281B(SF) operating for Saudi Arabian Airlines, ran off the runway hitting parked construction equipment.
- On December 22, 2013, the right wing on British Airways Flight 34, a 747-436 registered as G-BNLL, struck a building at O. R. Tambo International Airport in Johannesburg while taxiing on the wrong taxiway. Both the aircraft's wing and the building sustained severe damage, but no injuries occurred amongst the crew or 189 passengers, although four on the ground were injured. The aircraft was officially written off in February 2014.
- On June 8, 2014, there was an attack on Jinnah International Airport. Several aircraft were damaged and written off, including a PIA 747-367, registered as AP-BFV. There were 36 fatalities, including the ten attackers.
- On March 19, 2015, a 747-SP registered as 7O-YMN used by the president of Yemen, was damaged by gunfire from troops loyal to deposed president Ali Abdullah Saleh. Photos released a few months later showed the remains of the destroyed aircraft.
- On June 16, 2015, Delta Air Lines Flight 159, a 747-400 registered as N664US, was en route from Detroit Metropolitan Airport to Incheon International Airport in Seoul. About two and a half hours from landing, the flight encountered a hailstorm that caused damage to the radome and leading edges on the wings. Additionally there was severe turbulence that caused items to fall inside the cabin, although no injuries were reported. The aircraft eventually had temporary repairs made in order for the aircraft to fly to storage at Pinal Airpark in Marana, Arizona on July 10, 2015. It was determined that it was not economically feasible to complete repairs, and the aircraft was scrapped in 2016.
- On January 16, 2017, Turkish Airlines Flight 6491, a 747-400F operated by ACT Airlines en route from Hong Kong to Istanbul via Bishkek, Kyrgyzstan, overshot the runway on landing in thick fog at Manas International Airport in Bishkek and caught fire; 39 people died, including all four crew members, as well as 35 residents of a village at the crash site.
- On November 7, 2018, Sky Lease Cargo Flight 4854, a 747-400F, overran the runway while landing at Halifax Stanfield International Airport. The aircraft sustained substantial damage but all four occupants survived, three with minor injuries.

== 2020s ==
- On August 27, 2020, A 747SP belonging to Las Vegas Sands Corporation was damaged beyond repair by Hurricane Laura while stored at Chennault International Airport in Louisiana, U.S. The tip of the right wing struck a steel beam, causing the tip to separate. The nose section of the aircraft was also damaged by the wing of another aircraft stored at the airport.
- On February 20, 2021, Longtail Aviation Flight 5504, a Boeing 747-412, suffered an engine failure shortly after departure that caused debris to fall, injuring two people on ground. The plane diverted to Liège Airport, with no injuries among the three occupants.
- On October 20, 2025, A 747-481BDSF operated by AirACT as Emirates SkyCargo Flight 9788, registration TC-ACF, crashed at Hong Kong International Airport upon landing. The aircraft veered off runway 07L and struck a service vehicle before going into the ocean, killing two ground crew members onboard the service vehicle, while all crew members onboard the flight survived.
