= Emirates SkyCargo Flight 9788 =

2025 aviation accident in Hong Kong

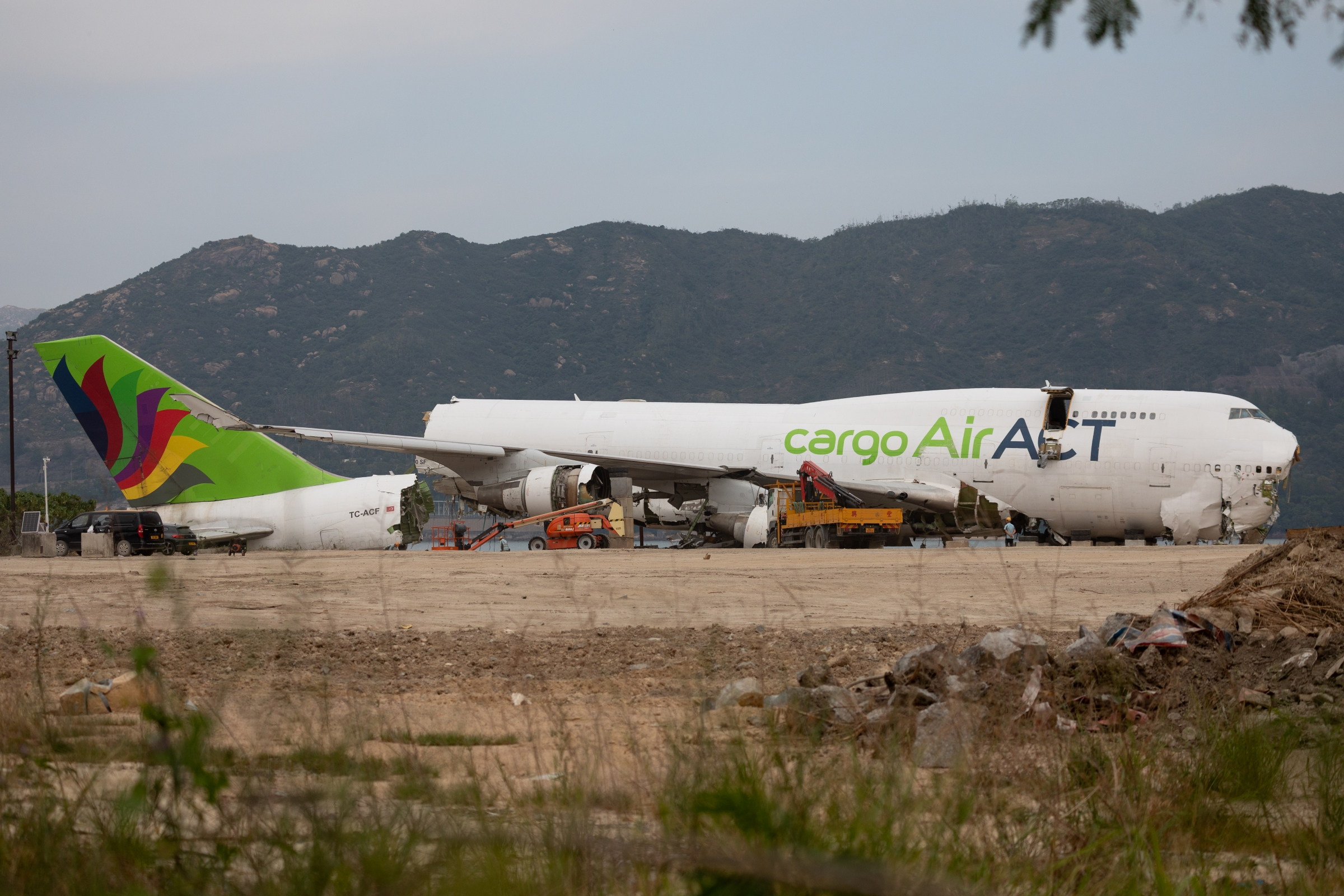
- Wreckage of the aircraft after being recovered from the sea

Accident
- Date: 20 October 2025
- Summary: Runway excursion, collision with ground vehicle on landing, plunged into sea; under investigation
- Site: Hong Kong International Airport, New Territories; 22°19′40.7″N 113°53′48.0″E
- Total fatalities: 2

Aircraft
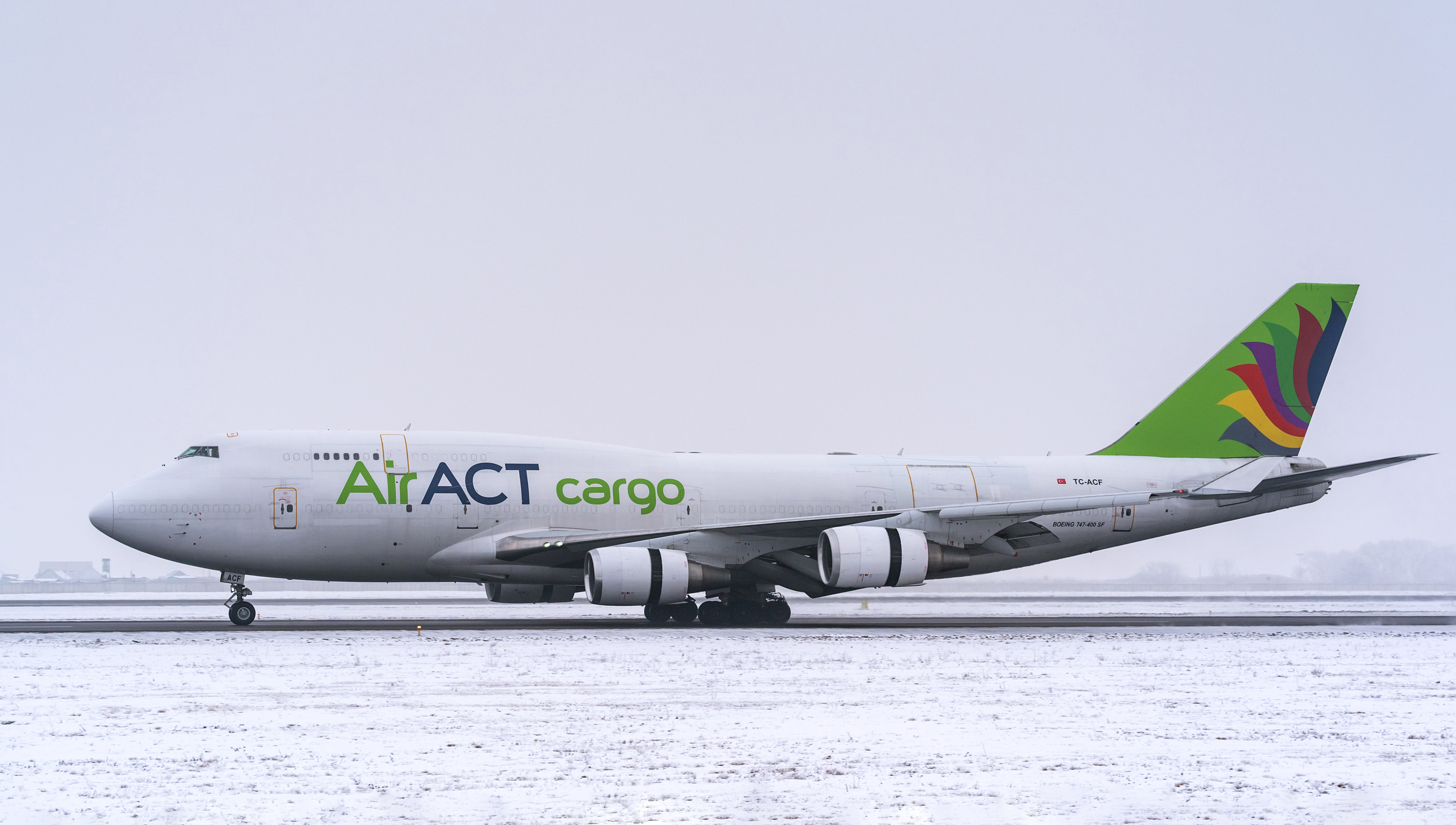
- TC-ACF, the aircraft involved in the accident, pictured in 2021
- Aircraft type: Boeing 747-481BDSF (Note: The aircraft was a Boeing 747-400BDSF; Boeing assigns a unique code for each company that buys one of its aircraft, which is applied as an infix to the model number at the time the aircraft is built, hence "747-481BDSF" designates a 747-400BDSF originally built for All Nippon Airways (customer code 81).)
- Operator: Air ACT on behalf of Emirates SkyCargo
- IATA flight No.: EK9788
- ICAO flight No.: UAE9788
- Call sign: EMIRATES 9788
- Registration: TC-ACF
- Flight origin: Al Maktoum International Airport, Jebel Ali, Dubai, United Arab Emirates
- Destination: Hong Kong International Airport, Hong Kong
- Occupants: 4
- Crew: 4
- Fatalities: 0
- Injuries: 0
- Survivors: 4

Ground casualties
- Ground fatalities: 2

Emirates SkyCargo Flight 9788 was a scheduled international cargo flight operated by Air ACT for Emirates SkyCargo from Al Maktoum International Airport, Dubai, to Hong Kong International Airport, Hong Kong. On 20 October 2025, the aircraft operating the flight, a Boeing 747-400, suffered a runway excursion at Hong Kong International Airport at around 03:53 HKT (19:53 UTC). The aircraft collided with a ground vehicle and subsequently crashed into the South China Sea. The two airport security staff in a ground vehicle were killed, while all four occupants of the aircraft survived. The aircraft, which split into two pieces, was destroyed and written off.

Airport Authority Hong Kong later announced runway 07L, the incident runway, was fit for use after examination. It is the first fatal aviation incident to occur at Hong Kong International Airport since China Airlines Flight 642 in 1999.

== Background ==
=== Aircraft ===
The aircraft involved was TC-ACF, a Boeing 747-481BDSF operated by Air ACT for Emirates SkyCargo. The aircraft was first delivered as a passenger plane to All Nippon Airways (ANA) on 13 June 1993 with registration JA8962, and previously bore a Pokémon special livery during its time with ANA. Following its retirement from ANA, the aircraft was converted to a freighter in 2011 and delivered to Air ACT in 2013. It was one of two aircraft operated by Air ACT at the time of the accident.

=== Flight crew ===
The flight crew consisted of 35-year-old Captain Atilla Yilmaz, 44-year-old first officer Candemir Ulker, 35-year-old loadmaster Caner Durgut and 46-year-old aircraft maintenance engineer Muzaffer Tuydu. All of them were Turkish nationals.

=== Ground crew ===
The two airport security staff killed in the collision were a 41-year-old man and a 30-year-old man.

== Accident ==
The aircraft departed Al Maktoum International Airport in Dubai on 19 October 2025 at about 16:59 local time (12:59 UTC). Takeoff and cruise went uneventfully. On 20 October, at about 03:53 HKT (19 October, 19:53 UTC), the aircraft landed at Hong Kong International Airport on runway 07L. The thrust reverser for engine four was inoperative. Upon landing, thrust reversers for engines one, two and three were activated and the aircraft had decelerated to about 90 knots (170 km/h; 100 mph) when the number four engine spooled to 95% forward thrust, and the aircraft veered off the left side of the runway about 5,000 feet (1,500 m) past the threshold. During the excursion, the aircraft struck a patrol vehicle that was carrying out patrolling duty on the road outside the fenced perimeter of the runway. The aircraft came to rest in the sea with its tail section separated from the rest of the fuselage, being nearly submerged in the water with large cracks clearly visible aft of the rear pressure bulkhead. The Hong Kong Fire Services Department had received notification of the incident at 03:55 HKT and began the rescue operation two minutes later.

Emirates confirmed the aircraft was not carrying any cargo. The ground vehicle was also dragged five metres from shore and trapped seven metres under water. The aircraft did not send an emergency signal and did not respond to air traffic control. According to Flightradar24 data, the aircraft hit the water at about 49 knots (91 km/h; 56 mph). At the time of the crash, the wind speed was 4 knots (7.4 km/h; 4.6 mph; 2.1 m/s) with gusts of up to 21 knots (39 km/h; 24 mph; 11 m/s). At least one of the aircraft's evacuation slides deployed successfully.

All four crew members on the aircraft survived and were transported to a hospital. One man in the vehicle struck was killed, while a second man was sent to North Lantau Hospital where he later died. The ground crew killed were a 41-year-old driver of the vehicle, and a 30-year-old passenger. The two ground staff had 7 and 12 years of experience respectively. At least 210 firefighters and first aid officers, 45 vehicles, ships and a flying service helicopter assisted in the rescue efforts. The affected runway was closed, but the two other runways remained in operation. 12 cargo flights were cancelled throughout the day while passenger flights were not affected.

=== Official response ===
Airport Authority Hong Kong confirmed the deaths of two ground crew members and offered its condolences.

== Investigation ==
Hong Kong's Civil Aviation Department said in a statement it was following up with the airline and other parties involved in the crash. The National Transportation Safety Board said in a Twitter post that they were sending a team of five investigators to assist in the investigation. Turkey's Transport Safety Investigation Center and experts from Boeing were also part of the investigation. The city's Air Accident Investigation Authority said it would release a preliminary report within one month.

All flight recorders were recovered. On 26 October, salvage crews recovered the fuselage and loaded it onto a vessel. The aircraft's tail and other parts including the flight data recorder and the cockpit voice recorder were lifted and sent to a laboratory for preliminary examination. Before the salvage operation, experts conducted an underwater sonar survey.

On 18 November, the AAIA released their preliminary report on the accident. The report found that the thrust reverser on engine four was inoperative at the time of the accident. Upon landing, the flight crew received a message on the engine-indicating and crew-alerting system alerting them that the autobrakes disconnected, prompting the captain to take over control and begin manual braking. Thrust reversers for engines two and three were activated to 90% reverse thrust, while engine one's thrust reverser was selected to idle reverse thrust. 30 seconds after touchdown, engine four spooled up to 95% forward thrust, causing the airframe to swerve left. The crew then deactivated the thrust reversers to try to regain equal engine thrust. The number four engine continued to accelerate to 106% forward thrust. The aircraft then veered off the runway, and thrust reversers were again reactivated. The aircraft then struck the ground vehicle and plunged into the sea.

== See also ==
- China Airlines Flight 605 – 1993 aviation accident in Hong Kong; another Boeing 747-400 that went off the runway at Kai Tak Airport in similar circumstances
- Turkish Airlines Flight 6491 – 2017 aviation accident in Kyrgyzstan; another Boeing 747-400F operated by Air ACT on behalf of Turkish Airlines
- List of accidents and incidents involving the Boeing 747
