= China Airlines Flight 605 =

1993 aviation accident in Hong Kong

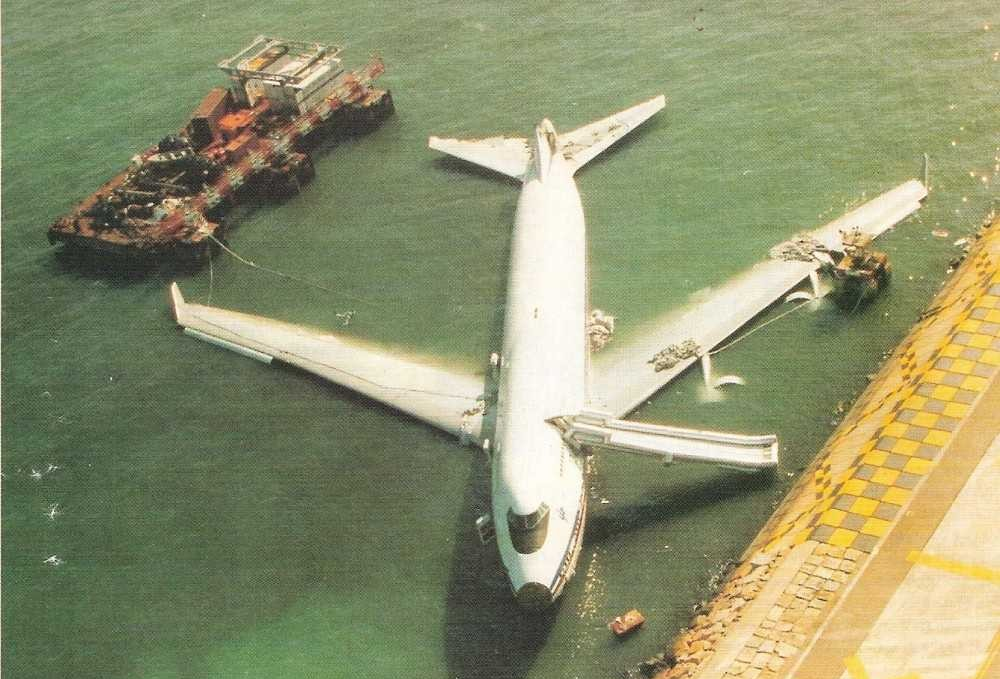
- The aircraft resting in Victoria Harbour; the vertical stabilizer was removed after the accident

Accident
- Date: 4 November 1993
- Summary: Runway overrun due to unstable approach caused by pilot error in bad weather
- Site: Kai Tak Airport, Hong Kong; 22.3183°N 114.1976°E

Aircraft
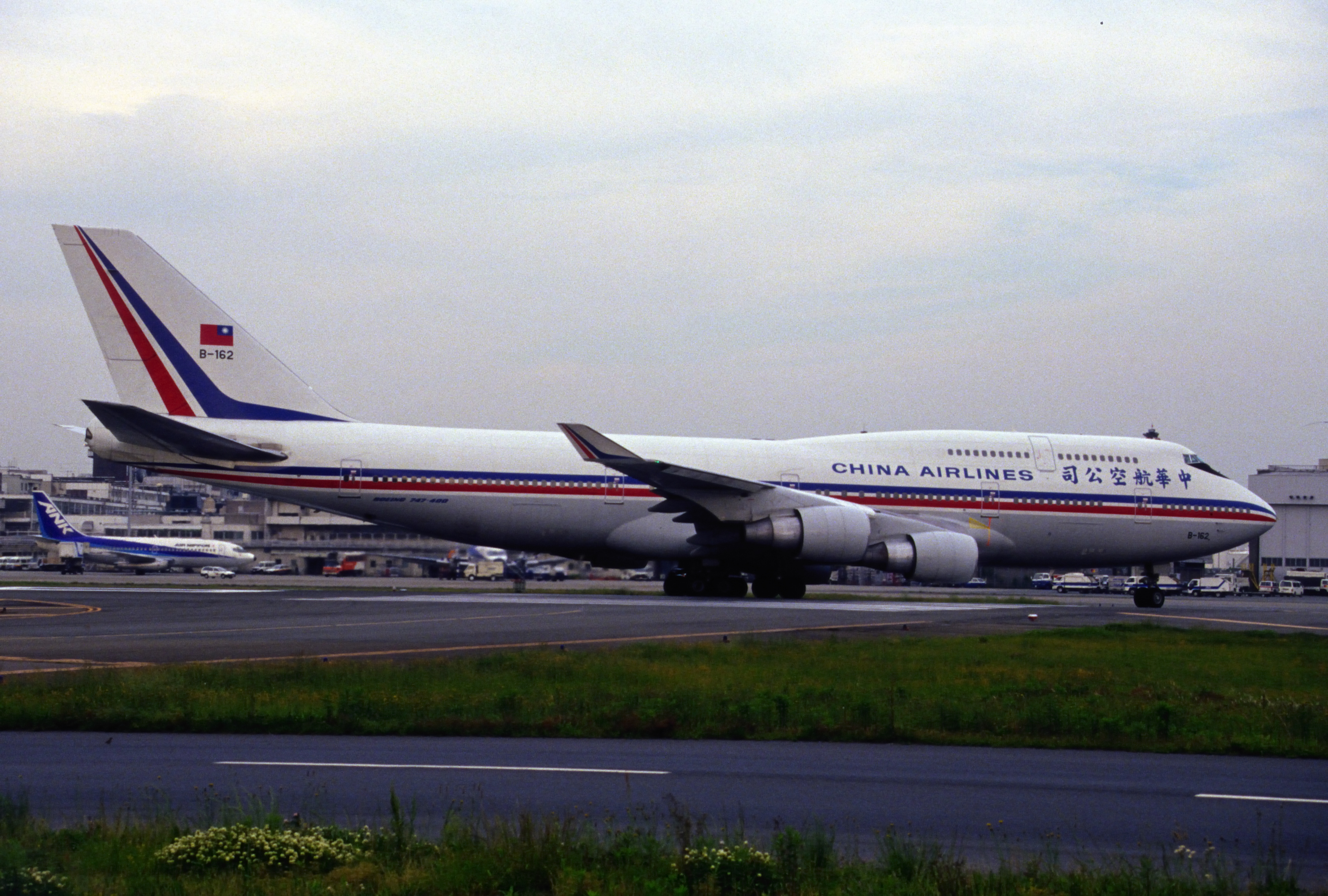
- A China Airlines Boeing 747-409 similar to the one involved
- Aircraft type: Boeing 747-409 (Note: The aircraft was a Boeing 747-400; Boeing assigns a unique code for each company that buys one of its aircraft, which is applied as an infix to the model number at the time the aircraft is built, hence "747-409" designates a 747-400 built for China Airlines (customer code 09).)
- Operator: China Airlines
- IATA flight No.: CI605
- ICAO flight No.: CAL605
- Call sign: DYNASTY 605
- Registration: B-165
- Flight origin: Chiang Kai-shek International Airport, Taipei, Taiwan
- Destination: Kai Tak Airport, Hong Kong
- Occupants: 296
- Passengers: 274
- Crew: 22
- Fatalities: 0
- Injuries: 23
- Survivors: 296

China Airlines Flight 605 was a daily non-stop flight departing from Taipei, Taiwan to British Hong Kong. On 4 November 1993, the Boeing 747-400 operating the flight went off the runway when attempting to land during a storm. It was the first hull loss of a 747-400.

== Background ==
=== Aircraft ===
The aircraft involved, registered as B-165, was a 5-month-old Boeing 747-400 manufactured in June 1993. It was powered by four Pratt & Whitney PW4056 turbofan engines and had only logged 1,969 flight hours in 359 takeoff and landing cycles at the time of the accident.

=== Flight crew ===
The 47-year-old captain had previously served with the Republic of China Air Force and joined China Airlines in 1984. He started flying the 747 (the older -200 variant) in 1988 and was upgraded to a captain of the 747-400 in 1990. At the time of the accident, the captain had logged a total of 12,469 flight hours, including 3,559 hours on the Boeing 747. The 37-year-old first officer joined the airline in 1992, having previously served with the Republic of China Army. He had logged 5,705 hours, though only 953 of them were on the Boeing 747.

== Accident ==
A British Airways pilot had refused to make the approach to Kai Tak runway 13 minutes before the CAL 605 captain decided to attempt it.

At 11:36 am local time, flight 605 touched down more than 2,100 feet (640 m) past the runway's displaced threshold, at a speed of 150 knots (278 km/h; 173 mph), following an IGS runway 13 approach. Typhoon Ira was generating 20-knot (37 km/h; 23 mph) crosswinds on that runway, gusting to 38 knots (70 km/h; 44 mph), from a heading of 070 degrees.

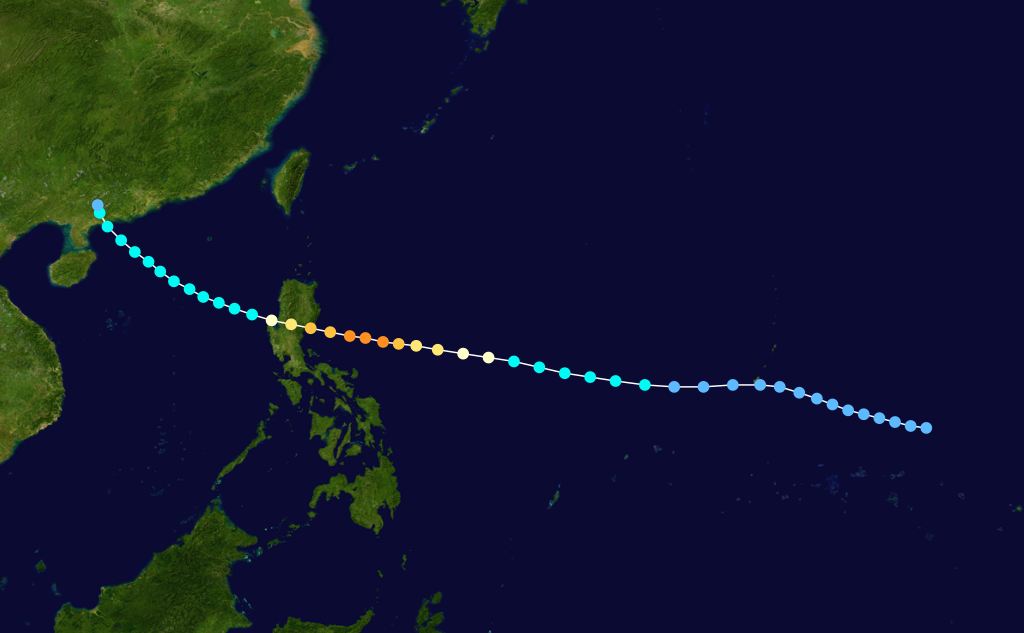
Track of Typhoon Ira

The pilots received several computer-generated wind shear and glide slope deviation warnings and observed severe airspeed fluctuations during the last mile before touchdown. The captain, who was the pilot flying, disconnected the auto-pilot and began flying the plane manually. He also disconnected the auto-throttle as he was dissatisfied with its performance. After the aircraft landed, the first officer took control of the plane and attempted to keep the aircraft on the centerline (of the runway). However, his inputs were too severe and the captain was forced to aid him. Meanwhile, the captain inadvertently increased engine power rather than activating the thrust reversers. The auto-brakes were set at only the number two level and then were turned off seconds after touchdown due to the increase in power. The speedbrakes were extended briefly, but then retracted, also due to the power increase. This caused the plane to "float", making the brakes ineffective until the speed brakes were extended again. When the First Officer finally noticed that the auto-brakes were disarmed and the thrust reversers had not deployed, the captain immediately applied manual braking and thrust reversal.

The captain deliberately turned the plane to the left when he realized the plane would overrun the runway and hit the approach lighting system (ALS) for runway 31. That action caused a "ground loop", making the plane slide off the left side of the runway into Victoria Harbour. The plane came to rest in shallow water, with a heading of almost 180 degrees out from the direction of runway 13.

The flight crew did not warn the cabin crew that the plane was about to overrun the runway. After the aircraft came to rest in the water, the cabin crew performed an unplanned ditching of the aircraft. Communication was hindered as the PA system was damaged and not functional; additionally, megaphones were not used. The captain and first officer performed the emergency checks from memory but did not use a written checklist. Crew members ensured that all passengers donned life jackets, and after permission from the captain, evacuated out of eight of the ten main deck emergency exits. These exits (as on all 747s) are equipped with inflatable evacuation slide/rafts for ditching emergencies. The passenger cabin remained completely above water during the evacuation, although eventually sinking tail-first. Additional damage to the nose and first-class cabin was noted. There were 23 minor injuries among passengers and crew.

== Aftermath ==
One passenger in seat 55J was determined to have not worn their seat belt during the crash and was standing up, causing them to be thrown forward into the seat of 54J and the left side of seat 54K. This resulted in the passenger in 54K being seriously injured, with a dislocated left shoulder and subsequent hospitalisation (for five days). The seat and seatbelt in 55J was found to be undamaged, but 54J and 54K were partially damaged. The passenger in 55J suffered minor leg injuries. Several other minor injuries across the plane were reported, including injuries caused by luggage bins opening during the crash.

The airport fire service was on standby due to the increased wind conditions. After an alarm was raised by the control tower, they immediately responded. The first rescue vehicle arrived within one minute of the plane crashing. Ladders were placed along the seawall, and inflatable life-rafts alongside divers were deployed. Rescue was aided by several nearby vessels including a tugboat, several small private motorised boats, and vessels from the Marine Department and Marine Police (Region). The rescue operation was completed within 30 minutes without any major difficulty.

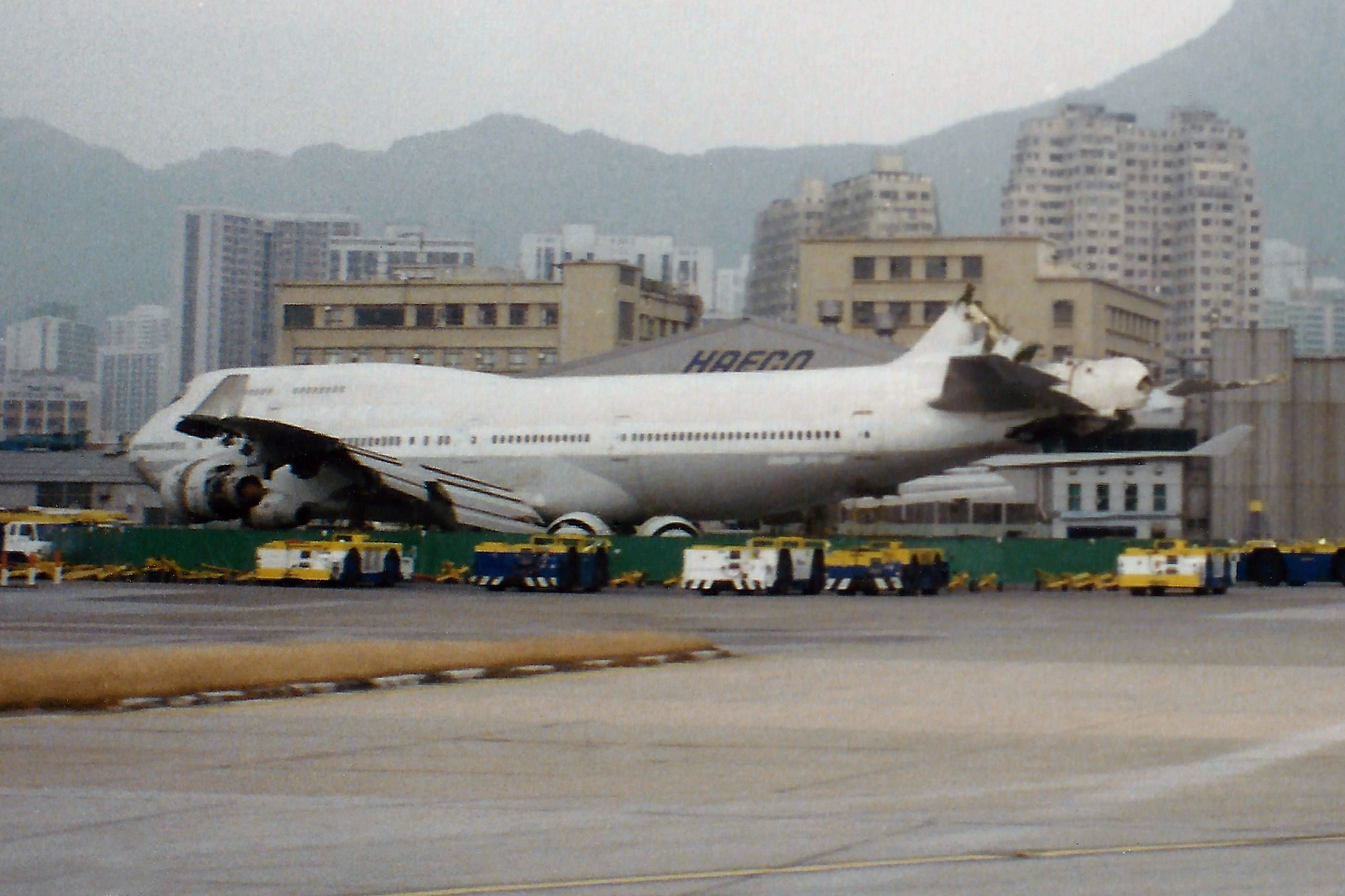
The aircraft photographed a few days after the accident, without its vertical stabilizer.

The aircraft was written off as a total hull loss. Since the aircraft's vertical stabilizer interfered with the accuracy of the instrument landing system signals for runway 31 – which allowed aircraft to make safe ILS approaches whenever the wind patterns mandated the use of runway 31 (the reciprocal direction of runway 13) – the vertical stabilizer was removed with dynamite shortly after the crash. The China Airlines lettering and the Chinese characters were removed, as was part of the livery on the fuselage, to conceal the identity of the aircraft as belonging to China Airlines. After the accident, the aircraft was stored near the HAECO building for use in firefighting practice.

== Cause ==
The investigation indicated that the accident was caused by the captain's failure to initiate the mandatory missed approach procedure when he observed the severe airspeed fluctuations, combined with the wind shear and glide slope deviation alerts. The first officer was also found to not have enough experience to handle the aircraft while landing in crosswind conditions. China Airlines was also criticized for not having a clear crosswind landing procedure in their manuals to aid pilots. The investigation recommended that the airline revise its manuals and flight training.

== See also ==
- Emirates SkyCargo Flight 9788 (2025) – Another Boeing 747-400 which ran off the runway at Hong Kong International Airport (Chek Lap Kok)
