= Turkish Airlines Flight 6491 =

2017 aviation accident in Kyrgyzstan

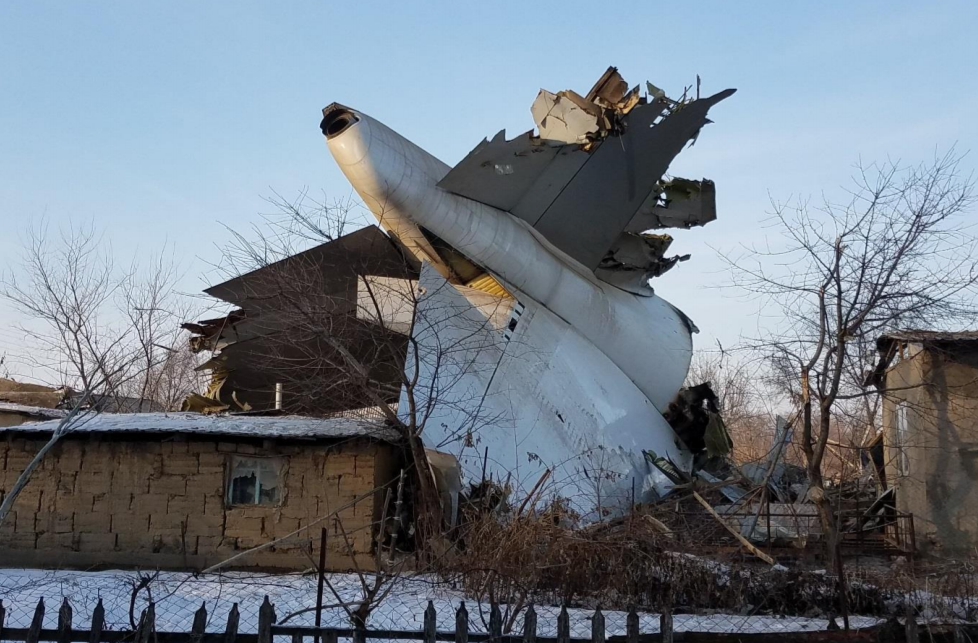
- Wreckage of the aircraft's tail section

Accident
- Date: 16 January 2017
- Summary: Controlled flight into terrain during go-around
- Site: Dacha-SU, Sokuluk District, near Manas International Airport, Bishkek, Kyrgyzstan; 43°03′26″N 74°26′14″E
- Total fatalities: 39
- Total injuries: 36

Aircraft
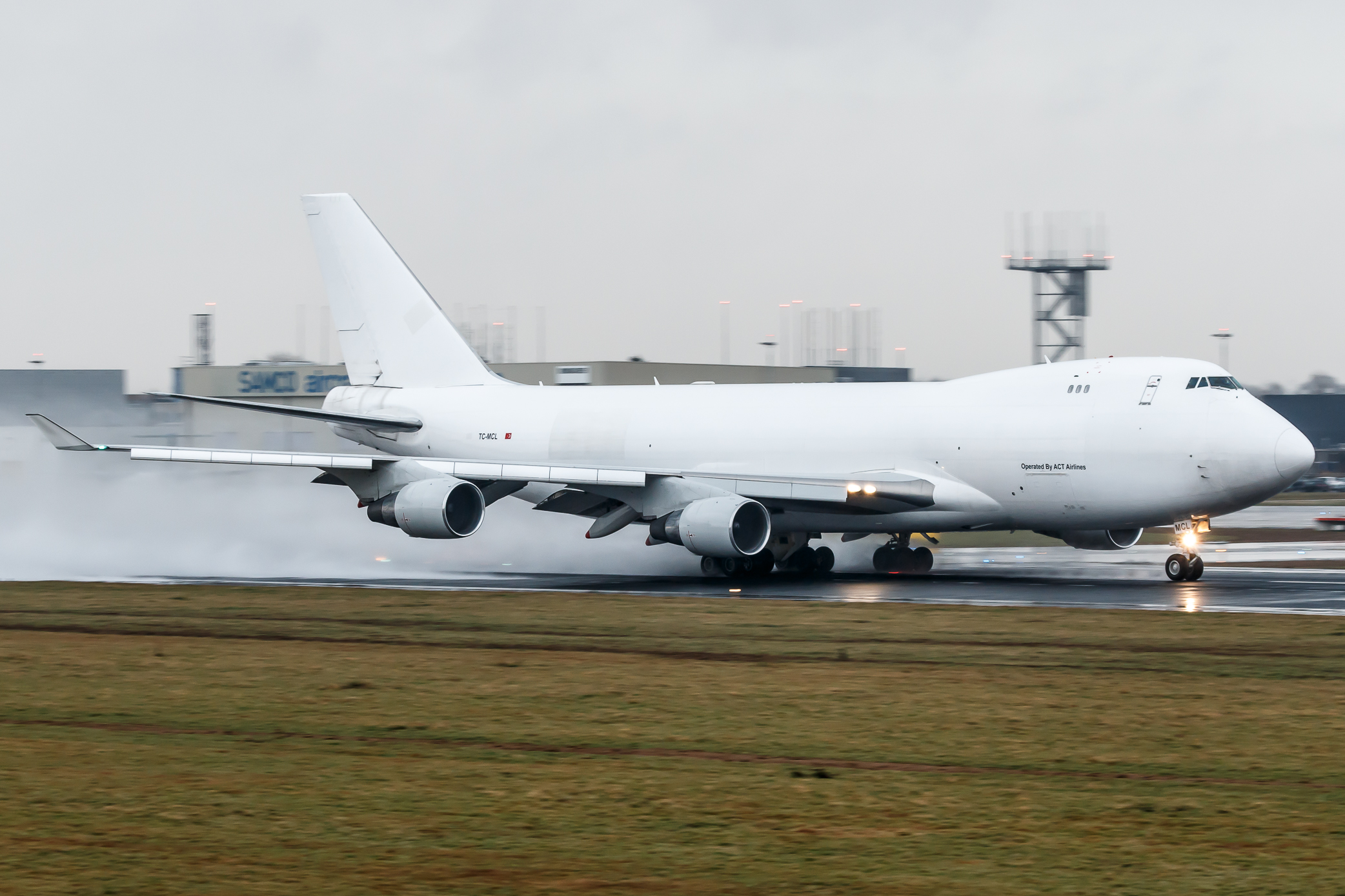
- TC-MCL, the aircraft involved, seen 5 days before the accident
- Aircraft type: Boeing 747-412F/SCD
- Operator: Air ACT on behalf of Turkish Cargo
- IATA flight No.: TK6491
- ICAO flight No.: THY6491
- Call sign: TURKISH 6491
- Registration: TC-MCL
- Flight origin: Hong Kong International Airport, Hong Kong, China
- Stopover: Manas International Airport, Bishkek, Kyrgyzstan
- Destination: Istanbul Atatürk Airport, Istanbul, Turkey
- Occupants: 4
- Passengers: 0
- Crew: 4
- Fatalities: 4
- Survivors: 0

Ground casualties
- Ground fatalities: 35
- Ground injuries: 36

Turkish Airlines Flight 6491 was a scheduled international cargo flight operated by ACT Airlines on behalf of Turkish Cargo, from Hong Kong to Istanbul via Bishkek, Kyrgyzstan. On 16 January 2017, the Boeing 747-400 flying the route crashed in a residential area while attempting to land in thick fog at Manas International Airport, Bishkek. A total of 39 people – all four crew members on board and 35 residents on the ground – were killed. It was Kyrgyzstan's deadliest plane crash since the crash of Iran Aseman Airlines Flight 6895 in 2008.

The subsequent investigation found that the aircraft failed to acquire the correct instrument landing system's signal. Due to a series of errors by the pilots, the aircraft flew significantly higher than the proper altitude for approach. The autopilot then picked up a false glide slope signal. Believing that they had captured the correct glide slope, the pilots let the autopilot put the aircraft into a descent. It then crashed into a residential area past the runway, mere seconds after a go-around was initiated.

== Background ==
=== Aircraft ===
The aircraft involved, manufactured in February 2003, was a Boeing 747-412F, (Note: The aircraft was a Boeing 747-400F model; the "F" denoting that the aircraft was the freighter variant of the 747-400. Boeing assigns a unique code for each company that buys one of its aircraft, which is applied as a suffix to the model number at the time the aircraft is built, hence "747-412F".) registered as TC-MCL with serial number 32897. The aircraft, originally registered as 9V-SFL, was first delivered to Singapore Airlines Cargo. After multiple periods of storage, the aircraft was acquired by LCI Aviation in 2015. It was leased to Istanbul-based cargo company ACT Airlines, which then began operating it on behalf Turkish Airlines Cargo from 2017. The aircraft had logged 46820 airframe hours in 8308 takeoff and landing cycles and its last C-check maintenance check had been completed on 6 November 2015. It was also equipped with four Pratt & Whitney PW4056-3 engines.

=== Crew ===
In command was Captain İbrahim Dirancı, aged 59, who had logged 10,808 hours of flying time, including 820 hours on the Boeing 747. His co-pilot was Kazım Öndül, also aged 59, who had logged 5,894 hours of flying time, 1,758 of which were logged on the Boeing 747. Loadmaster Ihsan Koca and cargo handler Melih Aslan were also on board the aircraft.

== Accident ==
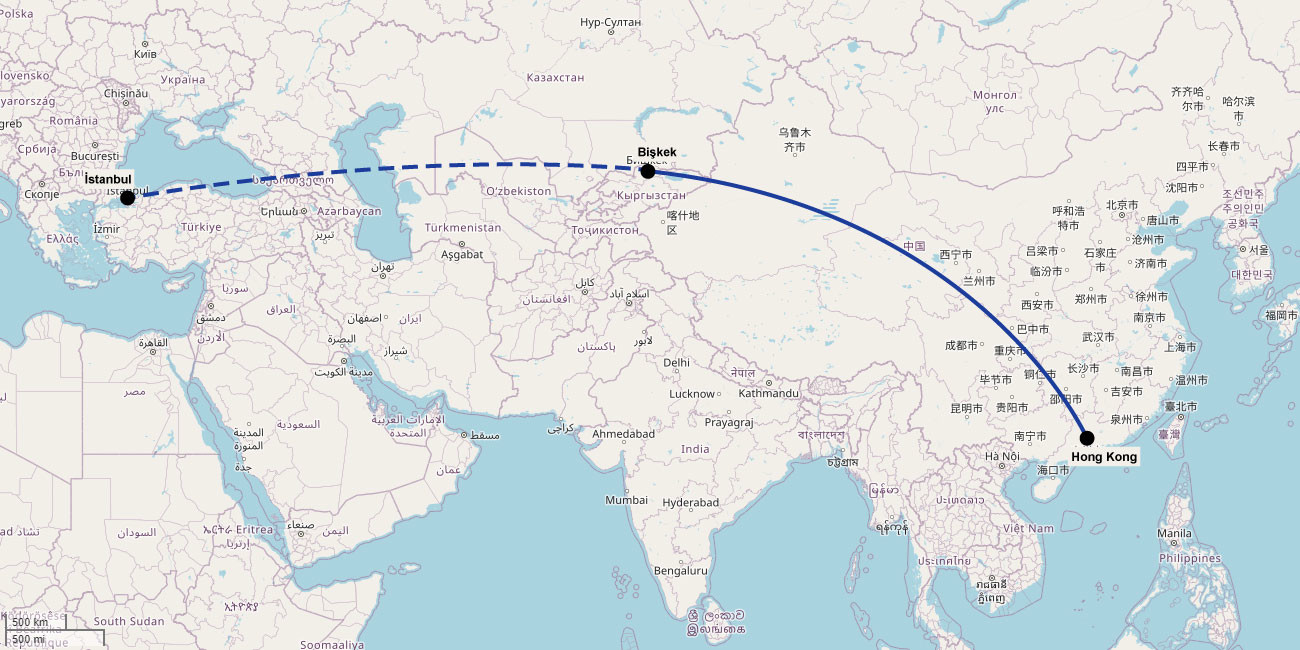
Route of Flight 6491

Flight 6491 was an international freight flight from Hong Kong's Chek Lap Kok Airport to Istanbul's Atatürk Airport with a transit at Bishkek's Manas International Airport. Two airports, Astana and Karaganda, were listed as alternate destinations in case the weather in Bishkek was not suitable for landing. The flight would be flown by ACT Airlines on behalf of Turkish Airlines. After a two-hour delay, the aircraft took off from Hong Kong at 03:12 local time and would be expected to arrive in Bishkek approximately 6 hours later.

=== Approach ===
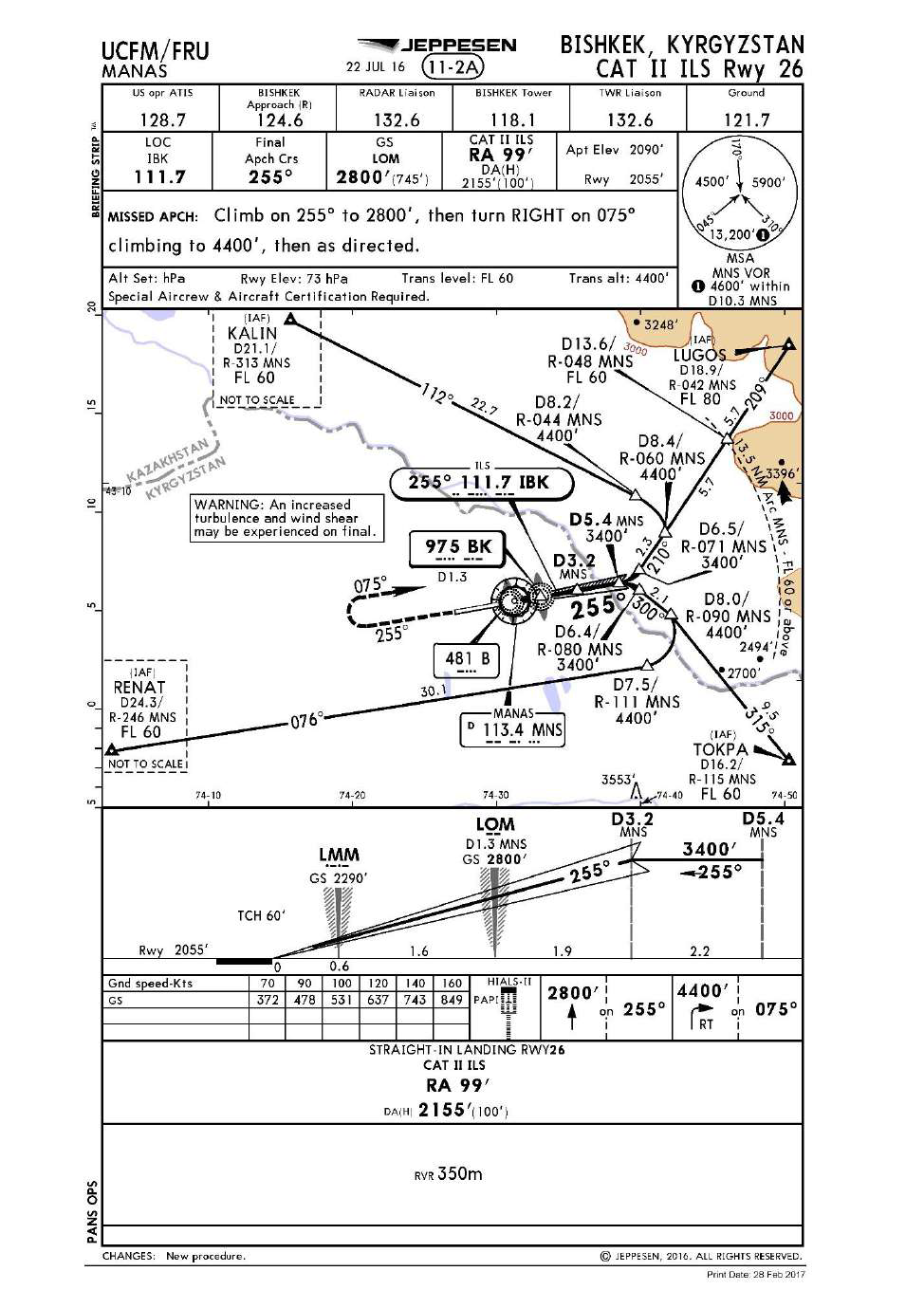
Jeppesen approach chart for Runway 26 of Manas Airport. Flight 6491 approached the airport from the south west. Waypoint TOKPA can be seen on the chart

In order to land in Manas, the crew of Flight 6491 would have needed to fly towards several sets of waypoints beforehand. The first one would be RAXAT, in which the crew would be obliged to fly at a minimum altitude of 17,000 ft due to the high terrain in the area. After passing RAXAT, the crew would then proceed to TOKPA and would be cleared to descend further until the aircraft's instruments managed to capture the ILS signal, which was necessary for a progressive descent to Manas, allowing the crew to safely land despite the mountainous terrain.

As the aircraft got closer to Manas, the pilots started their briefing for the approach. Weather reports indicated that Manas was covered in fog and that visibility had deteriorated. In response to the inclement condition, Captain Dirancı laid out the steps that the crew would take during the approach. Dirancı stated that a landing would only be commenced if they had managed to see the runway lights. If during the approach they had intercepted the ILS signal at an altitude lower than 1,000 ft, then a go-around would be called instead. The rest of the crew followed his instructions and didn't voice any objections.

Having finished with the approach briefing, the crew requested descent clearance to the ATC. The controller approved their request and ordered the crew to descend to 22,000 ft, which pleased Captain Dirancı as he had been aiming to land in Manas as soon as possible. Around eight minutes later, Captain Dirancı asked First Officer Öndül to request another descent clearance. The controller, however, denied clearance and asked the crew to stay on 22,000 ft as they were still flying above the Tian Shan mountains. Captain Dirancı thought that they would be allowed to descend sooner and was surprised to hear this, causing him to curse at the ATC.

Getting anxious with the aircraft's altitude, Captain Dirancı ordered First Officer Öndül to request another clearance. This time, their request was approved, and the crew was cleared to descend to flight level 180 and was not allowed to fly lower due to the mountains. Flight 6491 was eventually handed over to the approach controller. Still not satisfied with their altitude, Captain Dirancı ordered his first officer to ask for another descent clearance, even though they had not reached waypoint RAXAT, the first waypoint for the approach. While contacting the approach controller, the crew immediately asked for permission to descend. The controller did instruct the crew to descend to 6,000 ft to proceed to waypoint TOKPA. Since this procedure required a steep descent, Captain Dirancı responded with dismay.

07:06:26	First Officer Öndül	Bishkek good morning, Turkish six four niner one
07:06:29	ATC	Turkish six four niner one, Approach good morning radar contact descend flight level six zero TOKPA one arrival expect ILS approach for runway two six
07:06:39	First Officer Öndül	Descend flight level six zero TOKPA one approach for runway two six, Turkish six four niner one.
07:06:50	Captain Dirancı	They left us high again.

After passing waypoint RAXAT, the crew initiated their descent from 18,000 ft to 6,000 ft. The autopilot was set with the targeted airspeed of 260 knots, and the engines were set to near idle. The anti-icing was turned off. Due to the high rate of descent, the airspeed soared. In response to this, Captain Dirancı stated that he would maintain such speed and would only correct it later on. Despite the airspeed, the descent was not as quick as Captain Dirancı had hoped, and thus he deployed the airbrakes when the aircraft was at 12,200 ft.

The aircraft eventually reached waypoint TOKPA at 9,200 ft, approximately 3,000 ft higher than the altitude that had been instructed earlier. The crew, however, decided to continue with the approach. ATC eventually cleared them for further descent and to head towards another waypoint to intercept the ILS glideslope signal. Both pilots then tried to find the airport's glideslope signal, but to no avail. Struggling to find the signal, Captain Dirancı ordered First Officer Öndül to look for the runway. They eventually passed the airport's final approach point, but no signal was received from the ILS. Angered by this, Captain Dirancı vented his anger by cursing the ATC again, to the surprise of First Officer Öndül, who tried to calm down Dirancı. Despite not acquiring the ILS signal, the crew still continued their approach to Manas.

While nearing Manas, the ATC worker cleared Flight 6491 to land. On board the aircraft, the crew were still searching for the signal. Suddenly, the aircraft's flight system detected the signal from the ILS. At an altitude of 3,400 ft, the autopilot captured it and finally initiated the descent to Manas.

=== Descent and accident ===
Captain Dirancı immediately engaged the aircraft's autoland system, and the aircraft began its descent with a nose-down attitude of 3 degrees. With their imminent landing, the crew tried to search the runway lights once more. The weather in the surrounding area was still filled with thick fog, hampering their attempts. As the aircraft was descending, its Ground Proximity Warning System (GPWS) suddenly blared, "Glide slope! Glide slope!" which was met with no response from the crew. The alarm eventually ceased when the aircraft reached an altitude of 200 ft.

Getting nearer to the ground, First Officer Öndül stated that the aircraft was approaching the airport's minimum decision altitude, the height at which the pilots needed to decide whether to land or go around unless they had acquired visuals with the runway. Trying to see the runway once more, the crew attempted to locate the runway again. The aircraft reached the minimum decision altitude, but the pilots still weren't able to locate the runway. As such, Captain Dirancı immediately called for a go-around.

07:17:00	First Officer Öndül	Approaching minimums.
07:17:02	Captain Dirancı	Okay, look outside, brother.
07:17:04	Commentary	One hundred
07:17:06	First Officer Öndül	Minimums
07:17:08	Captain Dirancı	Negative, go-around!
07:17:08.8	Commentary	Fifty, minimums
07:17:10	Commentary	Four quick beeping sound

But as the aircraft was starting to climb, rows of trees suddenly came into view. The right wingtip clipped the treetops while the landing gear and engines ploughed through the airport's perimeter fence. The aircraft came back down, touched down, and bounced back into the air before it crashed into another fence. Its right wing then slammed onto houses, causing the wing to disintegrate. The aircraft then turned to the right before flipping over completely, bursting into massive flames and engulfing dozens of houses in the area.

== Response ==
=== Search and rescue operation ===
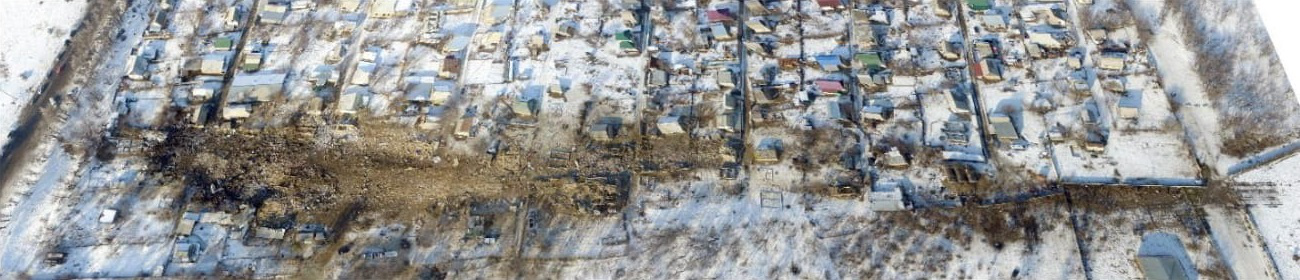
Aerial view of the accident site

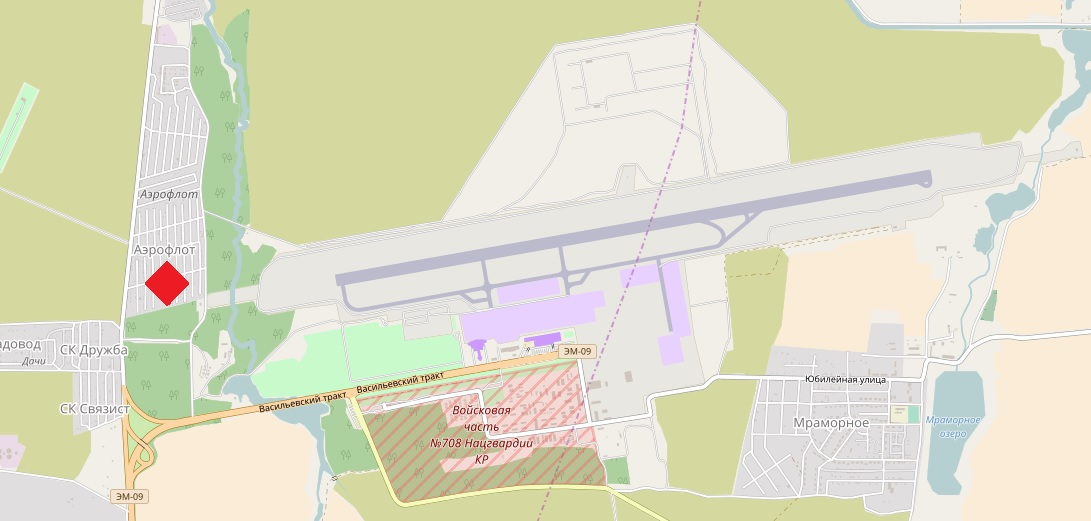
The location of the accident (red square) past the end of runway 26 at Manas Airport

At 07:17 local time (01:17 UTC) on 16 January 2017, the aircraft crashed nearly 1 km (3,300 ft) beyond the end of runway 26 at Manas International Airport, at a residential area known as Dacha-SU (Kyrgyz: Дача-СУ). Minutes after the accident, at 07:23 local time, Manas Airport issued an alert to all rescue personnel. The first airport fire brigade arrived at the accident site on 07:30 local time. Reinforcements from Kyrgyzstan Emergency Control Ministry arrived around 10 minutes later. The accident site was then cordoned off. Residents who were trapped inside their homes were immediately evacuated. About 20 local residents also volunteered in the search and rescue operations. In total, there were 1,308 personnel who took action in the accident removal actions.

Authorities reported that at least 38 structures were destroyed, including 19 homes and 12 outbuildings. A total of 7 houses were partially destroyed by the accident. Some of the outbuildings housed livestock, which were killed by the accident and fire.

A total of 39 people were killed in the accident: all four crew members and 35 residents of Dacha-SU. One of the local volunteers also died of "natural causes" during the search and rescue operation. Among the dead were 17 children. Since the accident happened in the morning, most of the residents at the time were either asleep or preparing for their daily activities. There were reports that entire families had been wiped out by the accident. Autopsies report revealed that some of the victims had died from being trapped inside their homes due to the intense post-impact fire, which spread throughout the neighborhood. Others were killed by collapsing rubble. One of the victims succumbed to their injuries while being treated at a hospital.

Witnesses and rescuers reported that they found the pilot still conscious strapped into his seat, from which he had to be cut free. He later died while en route to a hospital.

Thirty-six people, including 17 children, were injured with varying degree of injuries. Manas International Airport was closed, with all flights cancelled, following the accident.

Two days after the accident, the search and rescue operation was ended, after authorities believed that they had recovered all victims from the accident site.

=== Government response ===
The Ministry of Emergency deployed more than 1,000 personnel to secure the accident site and safely remove the wreckage. The debris was scattered over 1 hectare. High-ranking officials eventually visited the accident site to observe the search and rescue operation, including then-Prime Minister Sooronbay Jeenbekov, Deputy Prime Minister Mukhammedkalyi Abylgaziev, Minister of Emergency Situations Kubatbek Boronov and Minister of Transportation and Roads Zhamshitbek Kalilov. Minister of Health Talantbek Batyraliyev reported that by 11:46 a.m. local time, around 56 doctors and psychologists and 14 ambulance crews had been dispatched to the scene.

The following day was declared a day of national mourning in Kyrgyzstan. The flag of Kyrgyzstan would be flown at half-mast in every public institution and diplomatic building. Accordingly, numerous entertainment programs were cancelled by radio and television stations. Several cultural programs were also cancelled. A number of heads of state expressed condolences, including the presidents of the other members of the Commonwealth of Independent States and the Prime Minister of Turkey.

In response to the accident, there have been concerns regarding the presence of houses near the airport, prompting calls for resettlement from multiple government officials. MPs of the Jogorku Kenesh asked the government to demolish the dachas and relocate the residents to a safer place. Concerns began to grow as an impromptu inspection revealed that the houses had been built illegally, as the dachas were only meant for seasonal dwellings during the summer and spring, but the residents opted to stay permanently. Many residents were unwilling to move due to financial reasons and instead asked the settlement to be given an official status. As issues regarding the dachas remained unresolved, the residents held a rally in front of the Bishkek White House to ensure their safety and the status of their homes.

Documents retrieved from the flight revealed that the owner of the cargo inside the aircraft was not known at all. There had been discrepancies in the documents of the cargo, in which the goods were shipped with instructions in the Kyrgyz language, raising suspicions that the aircraft had been carrying contraband, as no one from Kyrgyzstan had come forward to claim the goods for compensation. Opposition party Ata-Meken was quick to accuse that the aircraft was possibly a part of a corruption scheme and that the cargo actually had belonged to President Almazbek Atambayev, which he denied. Omurbek Tekebayev, leader of Ata-Meken, criticised the government for trying to conceal information regarding the true owners of the cargo. In response to this finding, the parliament established a temporary commission to investigate the matter further. The result of the investigation, however, was never made public.

=== Compensations ===
A commission was quickly established by the Kyrgyz government to provide swift assistance for the relatives of the victims. The Kyrgyz government announced that those affected by the accident would be fully compensated, including costs of treatment for the injured and funerals for the dead. Temporary shelters would also be constructed for the displaced.

Relief funds were set up across the country. Public funds managed to collect a total of more than 100 million Kyrgyz somovs, meanwhile in nearby Kazakhstan aids were also collected for the victims. Those included foods, utensils and clothing for the affected. The funds were taken by the government to be distributed to the victims, though the sum was not undisclosed as per requests from family members due to security reasons. Several family members eventually accused the government of failing to provide the adequate amount of compensation, while the government stated that the collected funds, including the ones collected from the public, had been distributed equally and fairly to the affected.

The Kyrgyz press reported that ACT Airlines had declared the intent to pay the victims compensation for all material and immaterial losses, citing a press release on the ACT Airlines web site. The press release itself, however, stated only that losses were covered by insurance. According to the Kyrgyz press, the Turkish government would take part in the compensations. A seven-day vacation to Turkey was eventually organized for the relatives of the 39 victims, which included a cultural and rehabilitation programme.

== Investigation ==
=== Initial investigation ===
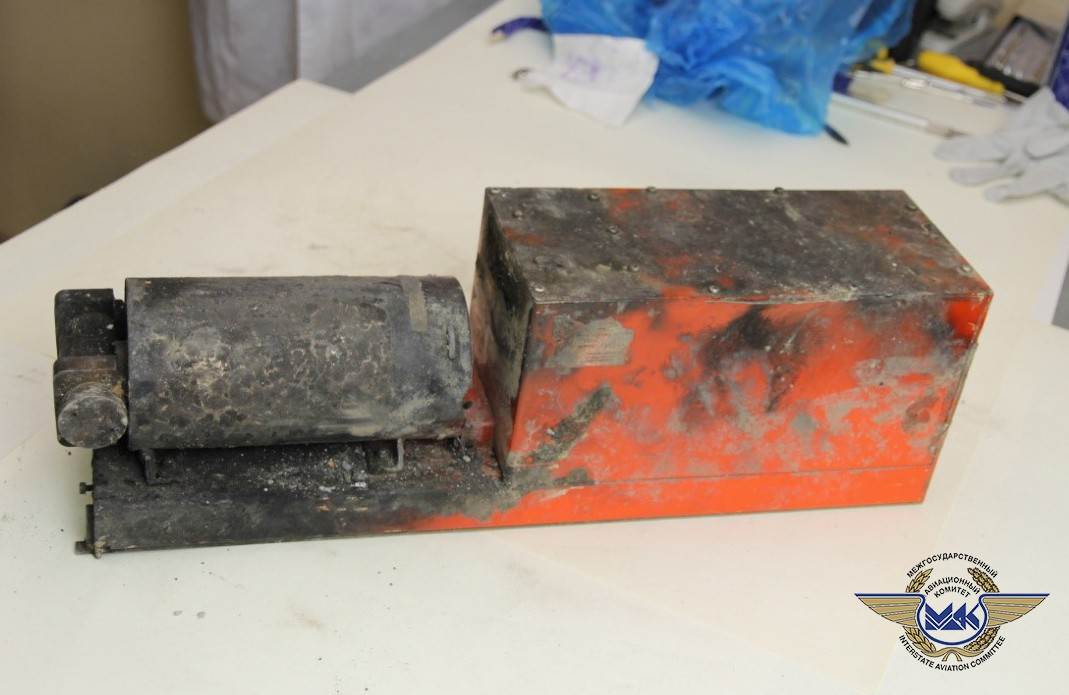
FDR of Flight 6491

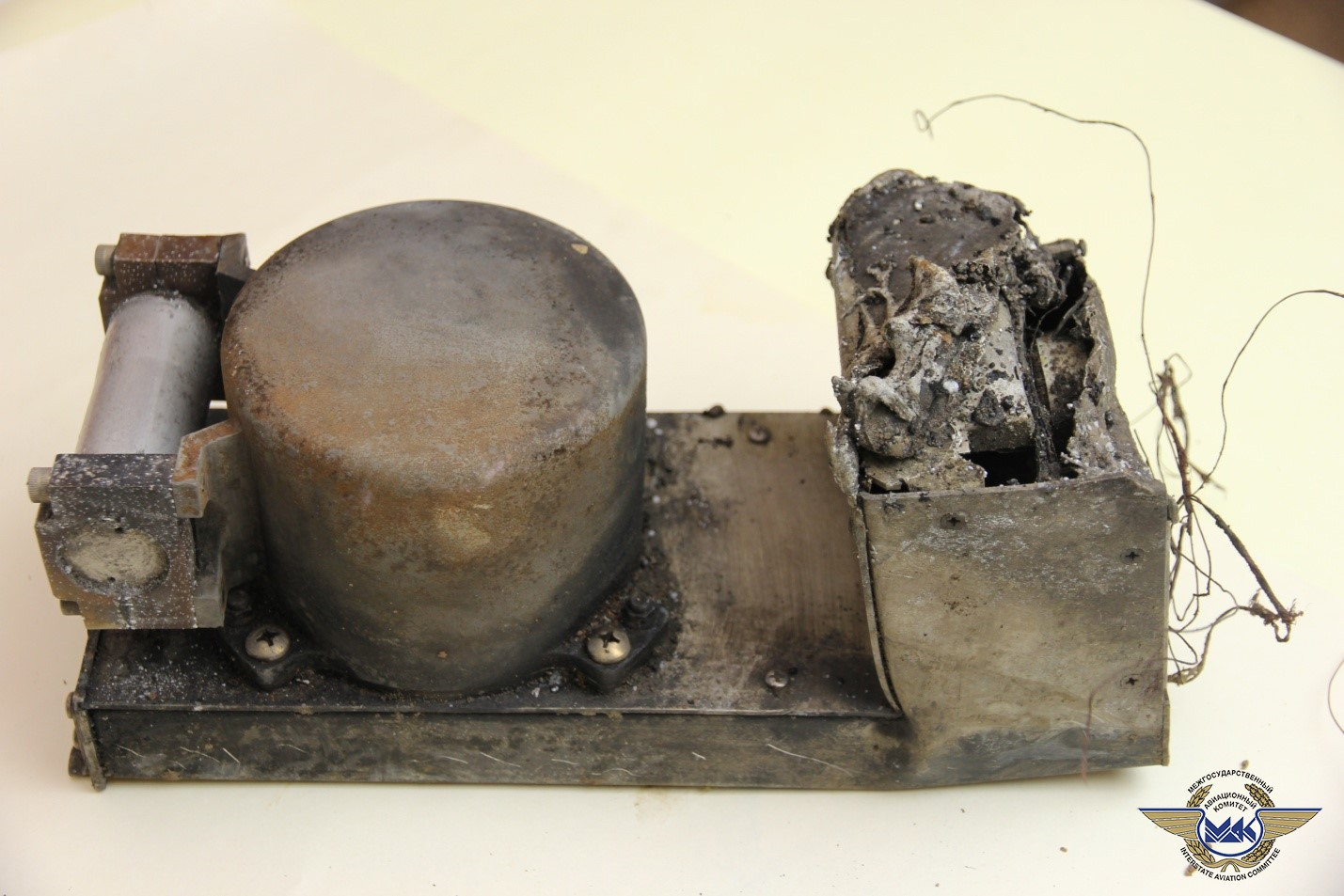
CVR of Flight 6491

The cause of the accident was not immediately clear. Kyrgyzstan's Emergency Situations Minister, Kubatbek Boronov, stated that it was foggy at Manas at the time of the accident, but that weather conditions were not critical. By the afternoon of 16 January, one of the two flight recorders had been found, and the other was located later in the recovery process. Both the flight data recorder (FDR) and cockpit voice recorder (CVR) were damaged in the accident, but investigators were still able to retrieve data from both recorders.

Deputy Prime Minister Abulgaziyev suggested that the cause may have been pilot error, noting that eleven aircraft had landed safely, despite the same weather conditions, on the previous day. He added that the aircraft had attempted to land twice and had damaged the runway lights at one stage. This statement was at odds with another official statement that the aircraft crashed during its first landing attempt, who stated that the crew were making a determined attempt to land the aircraft instead of aborting the landing.

The Interstate Aviation Committee (IAC or MAK) of the Commonwealth of Independent States opened a technical investigation.

The Turkish Transportation Ministry said it had sent two experts from its accident investigation board to Bishkek to assist Kyrgyz authorities. A technical team from Boeing visited the site to offer help and advice, under the auspices of the American accident investigation body, the National Transportation Safety Board.

Many initial press responses stated that a Turkish Airlines aircraft was involved in the accident. In response, Turkish Airlines released a statement saying that neither the aircraft nor the crew were part of the airline, calling it an "ACT Airlines accident". Journalists were threatened by Turkish lawyers claiming reputational damage. Nevertheless, the flight was operated under a Turkish Airlines flight number.

The preliminary investigation report found that the aircraft descended late and captured a false glideslope. On capturing the false glideslope, the three autopilots then initiated the descent of the plane in low visibility conditions. Initially all three autopilots were engaged (LAND 3). The false glideslope was lost 15 seconds after it was acquired and AP CAUTION and FMA FAULT 2 events were recorded, meaning that the autopilots would continue to descend the aircraft on a 3-degree slope using inertial guidance. One autopilot disengaged (LAND 2) and the remaining autopilots flew down to the decision height. The crew did not acquire the required visual reference at the decision height (99 ft (30 m)), and initiated a go-around 0.5 seconds later at 58 ft (18 m) radar altitude by pressing the TOGA switches. Given the slightly up-sloping terrain after the end of the runway, the aircraft did not have sufficient height at that point to climb out safely.

=== Conduct of approach ===
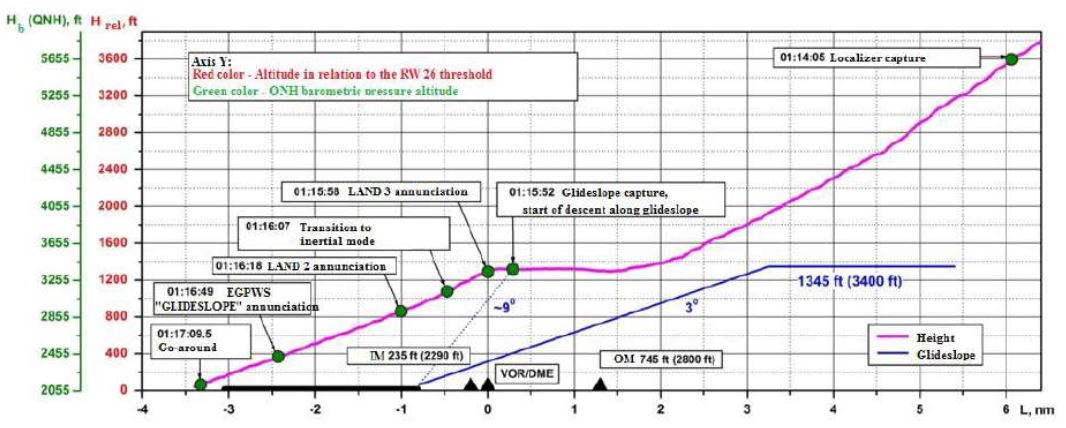
A graph depicting the approach of Flight 6491, with the blue line being the standard approach and the purple line being the actual profile of Flight 6491. Both the actual glideslope angle and the false angle could be seen in the photo.

The location of the accident site, which was located nearly 1 km (0.6 mi) from the runway, suggested that the aircraft had overshot the airport and had approached the airport at an altitude too high for a landing. Data from the flight recorders showed that the sequence of events started when they initiated their descent from 18,000 ft at waypoint RAXAT. Despite their high rate of descent, the aircraft was still flying at an altitude too high for a landing. This was caused by Captain Dirancı's reluctance to immediately deploy the airbrakes when initiating the descent. Without the brakes, the aircraft approached the airport at a tremendous airspeed and a rate of descent lower than it was supposed to be.

The crew eventually realized that the rate of descent was not enough and decided to deploy the airbrakes halfway through the descent, but it was already too late. By the time they reached the next waypoint, the aircraft had failed to reach the instructed 6,000 ft. Instead, it was 3,000 ft higher than the standard approach altitude, flying at approximately 9,000 ft. The crew, however, decided to continue their descent instead of losing more altitude by entering a holding pattern.

As Flight 6491 became nearer to the airport, the ATC worker in Manas cleared them to land. He didn't realize that the aircraft was flying too high as the radar data was not able to be displayed on his screen and that he was not certified to use the radar. He was only required to visually monitor the aircraft through the existing visibility in the airport. Investigators stated that the controller was not at fault as he had been following the established protocol.

Since the aircraft was flying at an altitude higher than it was supposed to, its landing system was unable to catch the airport's glideslope signal properly. The system did capture a signal at 07:15 a.m and the pilots who noticed it immediately engaged the autoland system so they could land as soon as possible. Investigators noted that this was not the actual glideslope but in fact a false glideslope signal that should have not been used by the crew to land. The fake glideslope was captured at an angle of nine degree, while the actual glideslope was at three degree angle.

The signal was captured at a distance of approximately 0.4 nautical miles from the runway, far too short for a landing as the aircraft was still at 3,400 ft. By this time, they should have been flying at 400 ft above the ground and already descending. The crew decided to press on, remaining unaware that they were already close with the airport and would fail their landing.

=== Emotional state ===
Even though the aircraft had picked up the false glideslope signal, it would immediately disappear within two seconds after it had been detected by the flight system. The flight monitor would still display the signal for about 15 seconds before it disappeared as well, and the autopilot would automatically warn the crew that they had lost the glideslope, but the crew somehow didn't notice this and instead decided to continue their descent. Apparently, the crew was not paying much attention to their instruments as they were too fixated on finding the runway to land as immediately as possible and hence didn't notice that the signal had disappeared.

The crew's fixation to land as quickly as possible was likely caused by fatigue, as they had been flying for 11 hours straight, aggravated by the fact that at the time of the accident it was early morning when people were usually asleep. This was evidenced by Captain Dirancı's disregard for his earlier decision to abandon the approach if they had failed to acquire the glideslope properly. With their fatigued state, the crew was eager to land as quickly as possible to get proper rest. As a result, their decision-making was impaired, noted by multiple deviations from the standard procedure during the flight.

Other than their fatigued state, the cockpit voice recording indicated that the crew also became increasingly stressed during the approach, particularly Captain Dirancı, who was the commander of the flight and the one who was in control. Throughout the flight, he could be audibly heard being anxious about the aircraft's altitude and at times even swore at the ATC. As soon as he was cleared to descend, he was relieved but stopped short of it and became upset after being told to hold their altitude again. At around 07:14, the CVR recorded Captain Dirancı saying, "He left us high again, fucking faggot!" to First Officer Öndül's surprise, who eventually tried to calm Dirancı down.

After capturing the glideslope, instead of assessing the situation, Captain Dirancı immediately engaged the aircraft's autoland system. The aircraft's system showed that they had captured the false signal, but the crew elected to ignore it. The aircraft's Ground Proximity Warning System eventually blared, warning the crew that they had even deviated from the false glideslope, but remarkably the crew still ignored the warning. After sounding for some time, the alarm ceased as the system believed that there were no more glideslope to be followed anymore.

Merely hundreds of feet from the ground, Captain Dirancı asked First Officer Öndül to search for the runway, which in itself was another violation of the correct procedure, as per the procedure he was obliged to monitor the cockpit instruments rather than searching the runway. By the time Captain Dirancı asked First Officer Öndül to locate the runway, they had gone way past it and instead were nearing the runway end. A call for a go-around was made by Dirancı at a height of 58 ft, and right when they were at the runway end, but by then there was no more room for recovery.

=== False glideslope ===
While human error played a major part in the disaster, investigators of the IAC noted that they were alarmed by the fact that the Boeing 747's autopilot system kept following the false glideslope signal even though it was incorrect. A test conducted by IAC using the Sukhoi Superjet 100 showed that the aircraft's autopilot immediately stopped engaging when it recognized that it had been following the incorrect glideslope. With the Boeing 747, the system not only activated with the signal but also caused the aircraft to flare and land even when the aircraft was past the runway touchdown zone.

The glideslope signal could be captured at several angles, specifically at 3 degrees, 6 degrees, and 9 degrees. The actual angle that is standard for an approach to an airport is three degrees, while the ones that appear at the remaining angles are deemed as false. However, if the aircraft approaching the airport is too high or deviates from the standard approach, it can capture a false glideslope at an incorrect angle. As per the FAA certification requirements, aircraft systems are required to warn the crew if the aircraft has picked up the wrong signal.

IAC then requested FAA to evaluate whether the aircraft had followed the required certification criteria and requirements, to which the FAA responded by saying that the aircraft had met all the requirements for certification. The FAA insisted that there was no reason to change the aircraft's automation system, stating that all of the system had worked as intended and had meticulously warned the crew on the false signal.

The IAC, however, disagreed with the FAA and stated that future improvements were needed. The IAC noted that the absence of a red light alert, which would have warned the crew of the false glideslope, contributed to the accident. The design of the Boeing 747 automatic approach system was regarded as deficient and needed further changes.

=== Final report ===
On March 3, 2020, the Interstate Aviation Committee (MAK) released its final report on the accident, stating that probable cause was the loss of control by the pilots over the aircraft position in relation of the glideslope during the instrumental approach, carried out at night in weather conditions suitable for ICAO CAT II landing. The report also listed numerous contributing factors.

The cause of the Boeing 747-412F TC-MCL aircraft accident was the missing control of the crew over the aircraft position in relation to the glideslope during the automatic approach, conducted at night in the weather conditions, suitable for ICAO CAT II landing, and as a result, the measures to perform a go-around, not taken in due time with the aircraft, having a significant deviation from the established approach chart, which led to the controlled flight impact with terrain (CFIT) at the distance of ≈930 m beyond the end of the active RWY.

— IAC

Recommendations issued by the IAC include calls for improvements in flight crew and ATC training, changes in the Boeing 747 automation system, and the addition of radar in Manas International Airport.

== Aftermath ==
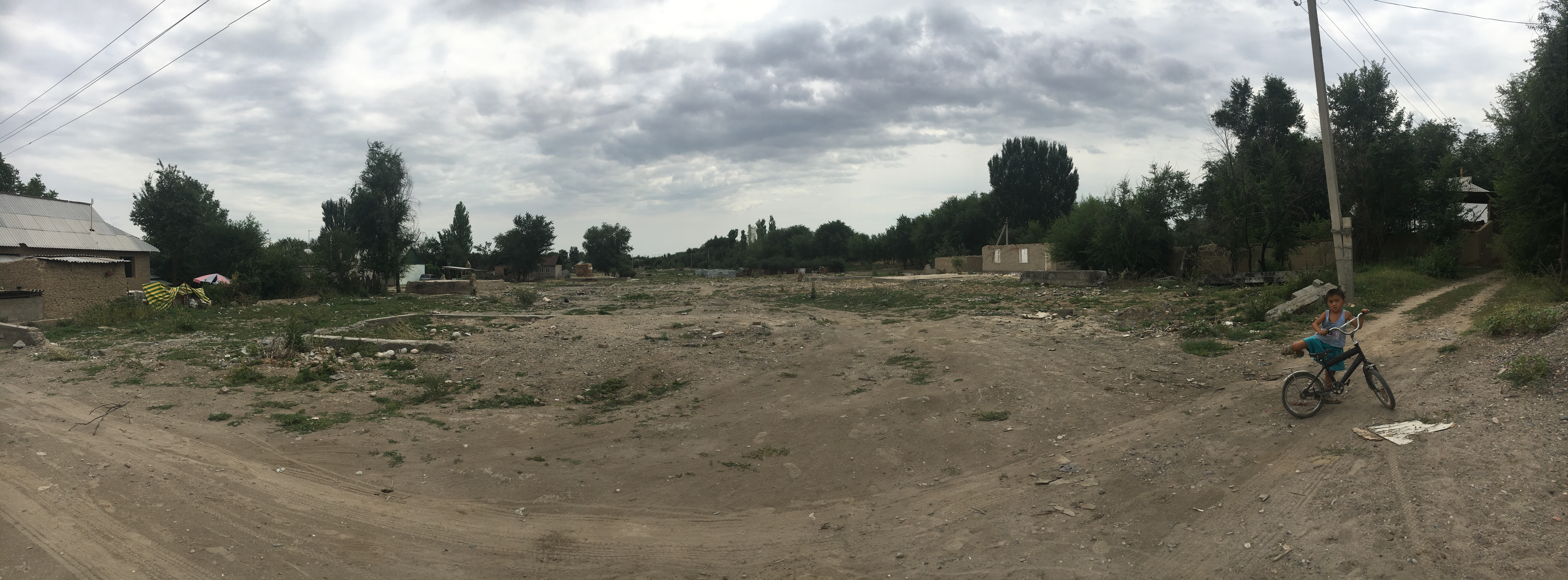
Accident site of Flight 6491, pictured six months after the accident

=== Memorial ===
A plan to erect a memorial at the site of the accident was flaunted by officials, which got approved for construction in the same year. Funding for the memorial monument would rely on the relief funds that had been collected for the relatives. During the one-year anniversary of the accident, the memorial was unveiled to the public, and a commemoration was held, which was attended by the residents of Dacha SU and several government officials.

On the anniversary of the accident, a minute of silence was observed by members of the Jogorku Kenesh. Children of the victims were invited to attend a meeting with Kyrgyz Prime Minister Sooronbay Jeenbekov for the commemoration.

=== Controversy ===
Several months after accusing President Atambayev of probable smuggling, the leader of Ata-Meken was sued for defamation. The Bishkek District Court announced that lawyers of Ata-Meken owed the president 10 million somovs for the case. The investigation regarding the ownership of the cargo was eventually suspended and the result was not made public.

However, approximately two years after the accident, criminal investigation into the accident was resumed by authorities, with the Prosecutor General of Kyrgyzstan, Otkurbek Dzhamshitov, refusing to give out details to the media. As the investigation progressed, approximately 22 personnel who had taken part in the search and rescue operation were charged with theft after being suspected of looting from the accident site. Afterwards, there were no updates on the investigation following the country's political turmoil in 2019–2021, which was marked by protests, civil upheaval, and conflict with Tajikistan.

Other than issues regarding the owner of the cargo and accusations of smuggling, residents of the dachas complained that they had been abandoned by the government. Despite early talks from the government on resettlement plans, most of the residents had not moved at all and remained living at the site. There had been attempts to follow up the result of the plan, but members of the government kept saying that they weren't aware of the final say, and in the end no actions had been taken. First Deputy Akim of Sokuluk District, Ulan Sadaliev, stated that at the time there were no existing plots for relocation. Several plots of lands had been offered to the residents, but the residents didn't accept them for various reasons.

The investigation finally continued in 2022, when then-President of Kyrgyzstan Sadyr Japarov decided to establish a new public commission to investigate the possible criminal nature of the accident and solutions for the relatives affected by it. The commission conducted hearings from family members and government officials for their response to the accident. Various issues including distribution of compensation money, possible misuse of the relief funds, accusations of contraband, and lack of government assistance were raised. In November 2022, the investigation was completed and a full report was submitted to the president. The commission concluded that the aircraft was not carrying illegal goods and compensation issues were to be resolved within a dedicated span of time. The resettlement problem, however, was not resolved.

In February 2023, it was reported that land plots belonging to Kyrgyz politician Maxim Bakiyev had been handed over to the Presidential Property Management Department for the construction of new homes for the planned resettlement.

== See also ==
- Emirates SkyCargo Flight 9788, another AirACT 747 crash
