= Air ACT =

Airline of Turkey

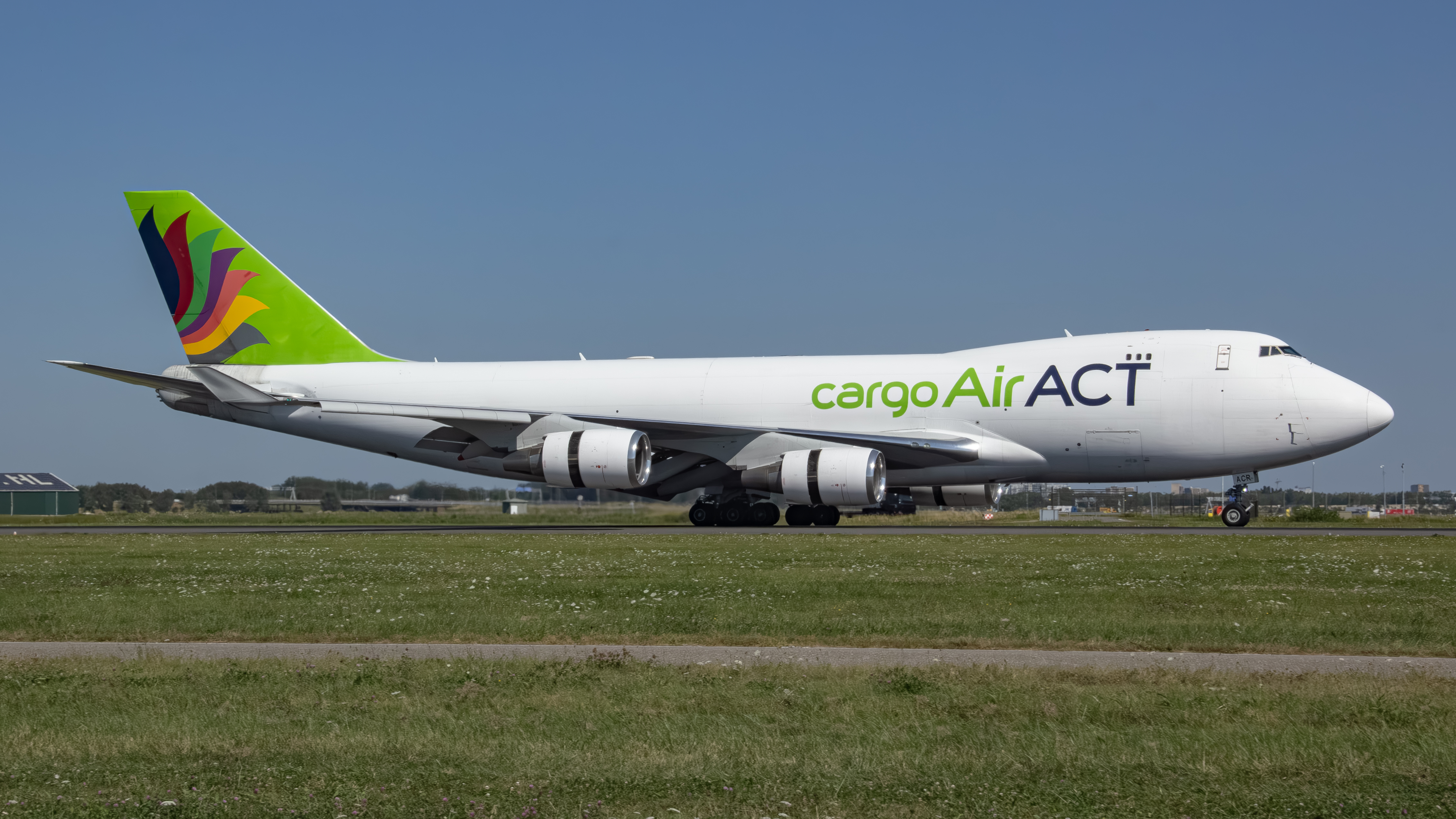
- Air ACT Boeing 747-400ERF
IATA	ICAO	Call sign
9T	RUN	CARGO TURK
- Founded: 2004; 22 years ago
- Hubs: Sabiha Gökçen International Airport
- Focus cities: Istanbul Airport
- Fleet size: 1
- Headquarters: Istanbul, Turkey
- Key people: Daglar Çizmeci (CEO); Gunes Namoler (Managing Director)
- Website: www.actairlines.com

Air ACT, legally ACT Airlines (Turkish: ACT Havayolları) and formerly branded as myCargo Airlines, is a Turkish cargo and passenger charter airline based in Kurtköy, Istanbul. It operates international scheduled and charter air cargo services, as well as wet and dry lease services. Its main base is Sabiha Gökçen International Airport, Istanbul.

== History ==
Established in 2004, the company changed ownership in March 2006 when Turkish aviation veteran Yavuz Çizmeci teamed up with HBK Investments to acquire the company. In February 2008, a 21% equity stake was acquired by Manara Investments Ltd. Manara is an investment vehicle sponsored by four leading Saudi business groups. New partners and existing shareholders expect ACT Airlines to become a leading regional and international player.

ACT received the prestigious SCATA Supply Chain and Transport Award for ‘The Air Cargo Operator of the Year’ in recognition of its exceptional customer service in 2007. The airlines also applied for IATA certification after completing the IATA Operational Safety Audit in 2007.

In 2011, China's HNA Group (partnered with Bravia Capital) bought 49% of the shares of ACT Airlines. 50.9% of the shares remain with Daglar Çizmeci and 0.1% with other Turkish holders. ACT Airlines rebranded as myCargo after this alliance took place. In August 2017 HNA swapped its shares in MyCargo for another subsidiary in Turkey, leading to airline going back to full ownership with its admin and operating as ACT Airlines once again, with fleet gradually being repainted to the brand Air ACT.

== Fleet ==
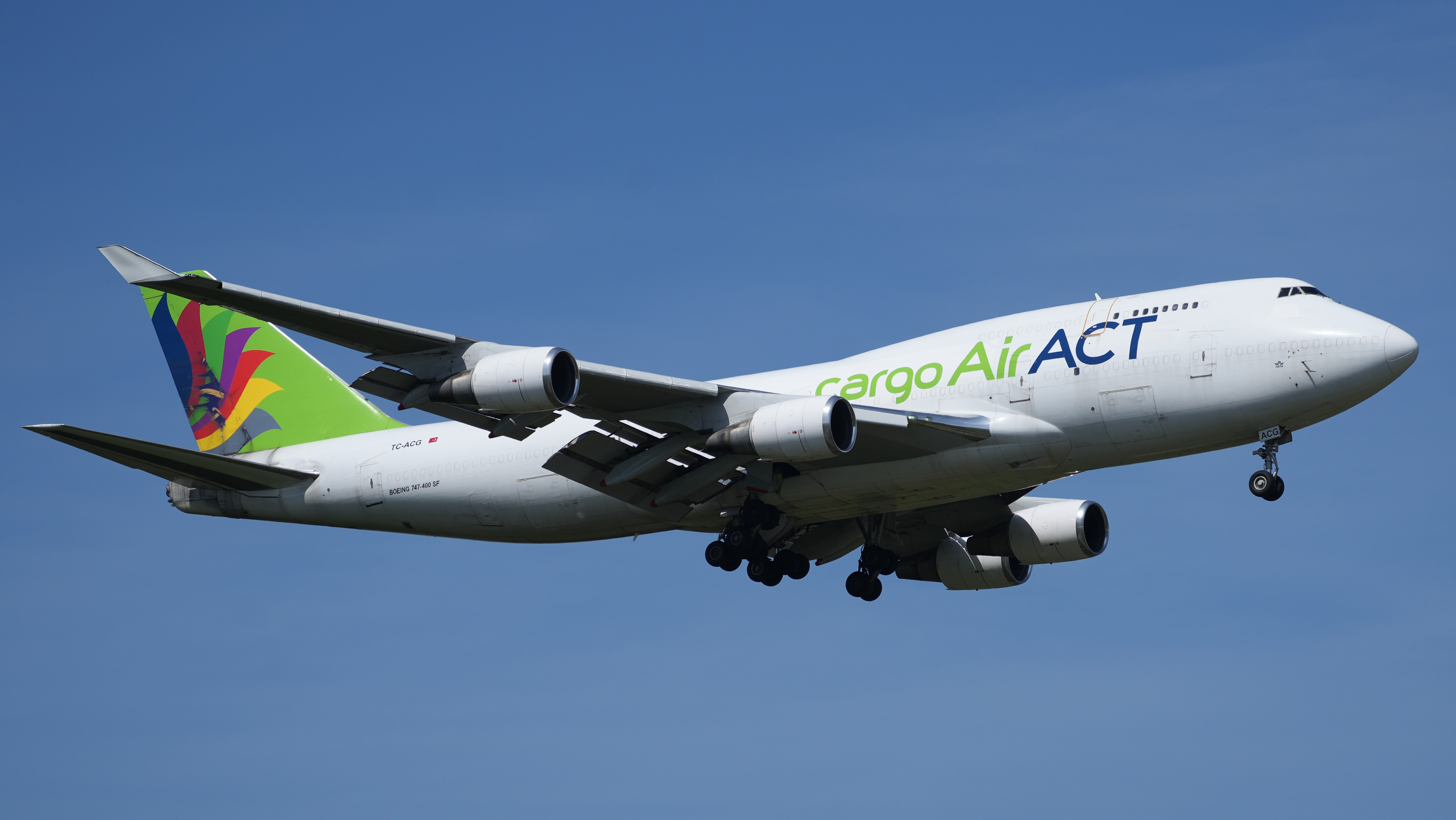
Air ACT Boeing 747-400BDSF

=== Current fleet ===
As of October 2025, Air ACT operated the following aircraft:

Aircraft	In service	Orders	Notes
Boeing 747-400BDSF	1	—	TC-ACG
Total	1	—	

=== Former fleet ===
- 2 Boeing 747-400ERF
- 1 Boeing 747-400BDSF (TC-ACF, which crashed on 20 October 2025 at HKG)

Air ACT formerly operated five Airbus A300 freighter aircraft with 1 hull loss in 2010. All those aircraft were retired in March 2013.

== Incidents and accidents ==
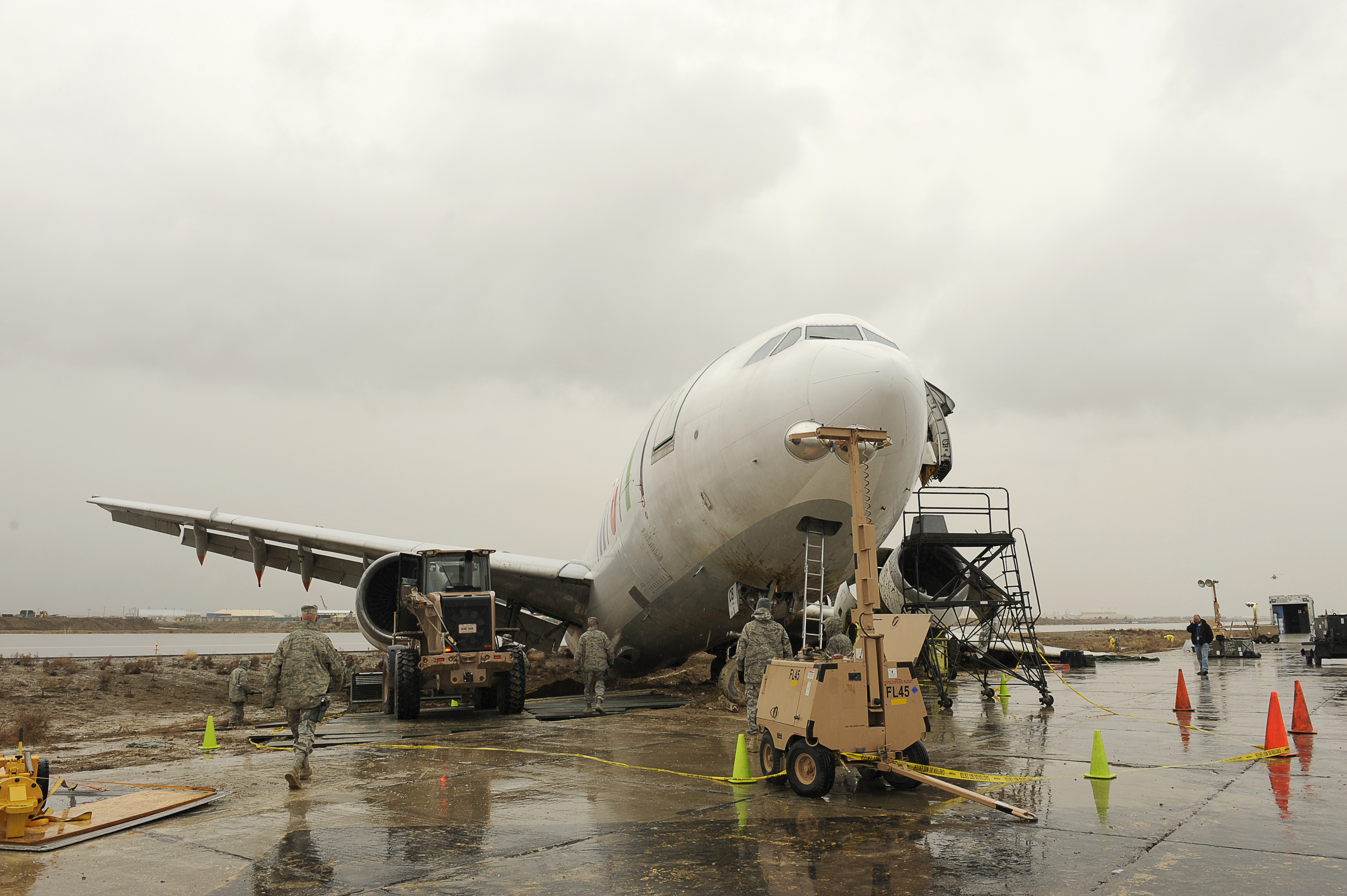
Airbus A300 at Bagram Airfield, two days after its accident in 2010.

- On 1 March 2010, an Airbus A300 registration TC-ACB operating Flight 521 for SNAS/DHL, sustained substantial damage when the port undercarriage collapsed on landing at Bagram Airfield, Afghanistan.
- On 16 January 2017, Turkish Airlines Flight 6491, a wet-leased Boeing B747-412F registration TC-MCL operated for Turkish Airlines, crashed during a go-around attempt from a very low altitude while attempting an approach to Manas Airport, Bishkek, Kyrgyzstan. The accident killed all 4 crew members and 35 people on the ground.
- On 1 February 2020, Saudia Flight 919, a wet leased Boeing B747-412F TC-MCT operated for Saudia, struck its tail onto the runway during departure from King Fahd International Airport, Dammam, Saudi Arabia. The crew stopped the climb initially at 7000 feet, later climbed to FL100 and subsequently decided to divert to King Abdulaziz International Airport, Jeddah, Saudi Arabia.
- On 20 October 2025, Emirates SkyCargo Flight 9788, a wet leased Boeing 747-481(BDSF) bearing registration TC-ACF operated for Emirates SkyCargo crashed in Hong Kong International Airport upon landing. The aircraft veered off runway 07L and struck a service vehicle before going into the ocean, killing two ground crew members onboard the service vehicle, while all crew members onboard the flight survived.
