= List of accidents and incidents involving the Douglas DC-8 =

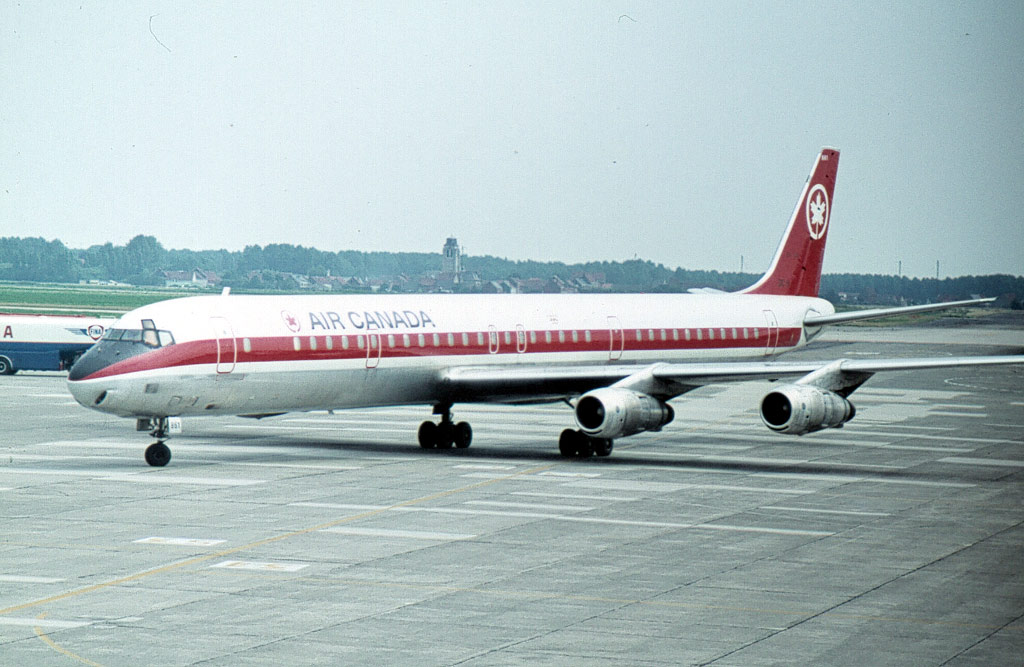
a DC-8 similar to the one involved in the crash of Air Canada Flight 621

Following is a list of accidents and incidents involving Douglas DC-8s from its introduction to commercial service, in September 1959, through the present.

== 1960s ==
16 December 1960
United Air Lines Flight 826, a DC-8-11 (named Mainliner Will Rogers) collided over Staten Island, New York City with TWA Flight 266, a Lockheed Constellation (named Star of Sicily). The 1960 New York mid-air collision killed all 128 people on both aircraft and six on the ground.
19 January 1961
Aeronaves de México Flight 401, a DC-8-21 (XA-XAX, named 20 de Noviembre) was damaged beyond repair following an aborted take off at Idlewild Airport, New York, United States, killing four of 106 on board and injuring one on the ground.
30 May 1961
Viasa Flight 897, a KLM DC-8-53 (named Fridtjof Nansen) was operating on lease to VIASA when it crashed into the sea off Fonte da Telha while en route between Lisbon, Portugal and Santa Maria in the Azores. All 47 passengers and 14 crew on board were killed.
11 July 1961
United Air Lines Flight 859, a DC-8-12, was damaged beyond repair after running off the runway at Denver, Colorado, United States, killing 17 of 122 on board and one person on the ground; the cause was traced to the thrust reversers.
7 July 1962
Alitalia Flight 771, a DC-8-43, crashed on approach to Bombay, India due to a navigation error, killing all 94 on board.
20 August 1962
Panair do Brasil Flight 026, a DC-8-33 (PP-PDT), crashed into the sea after departing from Rio de Janeiro–Galeão International Airport. Of the 120 passengers and crew aboard, 14 died.
29 November 1963
Trans-Canada Air Lines Flight 831 a DC-8-54F, crashed at Sainte-Thérèse-de-Blainville, Canada. All 118 on board were killed; the cause was not determined, but pitot icing, vertical gyro failure, and pitch trim compensator problems were suspected.
25 February 1964
Eastern Air Lines Flight 304, a DC-8-21, crashed into Lake Pontchartrain north of New Orleans. All 51 passengers and 7 crew were killed; the cause was a loss of control in turbulence.
25 November 1965
A Trans Caribbean Airways DC-8-54F (N8784R, named Barbara Henry II) was destroyed by fire at Miami International Airport, Florida, United States.
25 December 1965
Japan Air Lines Flight 813 en route from San Francisco International Airport to Haneda Airport experienced an uncontained engine failure in its number one engine shortly after takeoff. The crew made an emergency landing at Metropolitan Oakland International Airport across San Francisco Bay, and all 41 passengers and crew managed to survive without any injuries.
4 March 1966
Canadian Pacific Air Lines Flight 402, a DC-8-43 (named Empress of Edmonton), crashed on approach to Haneda Airport, Japan due to pilot error. Of the 62 passengers and 10 crew, only 8 passengers survived.
4 July 1966
An Air New Zealand DC-8-52 (ZK-NZB) crashed on takeoff at Auckland, New Zealand during a training flight, with two fatalities of five on board. A design fault of the DC-8 had caused the thrust reverser of #4 engine to engage when the thrust lever was rapidly set to idle.
13 August 1966
An Aeronaves de Mexico DC-8-51 (XA-PEI, named Tenochtitlan) crashed 21 mi from Acapulco after a descent was made while turning during a training flight, killing the six crew.
24 December 1966
An Aeronaves de Mexico DC-8-51 (XA-NUS, named Acapulco) crashed on the dry Lake Texcoco while approaching Mexico City; all 109 on board survived, but the aircraft was written off.
5 March 1967
Varig Airlines Flight 837, a DC-8-33, crashed on approach to Roberts International Airport, Monrovia. Of the 71 passengers and 19 crew on board, 50 passengers and the flight engineer were killed as well as five on the ground.
30 March 1967
Delta Air Lines Flight 9877, a DC-8-51 (N802E), crashed into the Hilton Hotel in New Orleans (Kenner), United States while on a training flight. Of 19 fatalities 13 were on the ground.
19 May 1967
An Air Canada DC-8-54F (CF-TJM) lost control and crashed on approach to Ottawa, Canada while on a training flight, killing the three crew.
21 February 1968
Lawrence Rhodes hijacked a Delta Air Lines DC-8 from Tampa, Florida to Cuba with 108 other crew and passengers aboard, including golfer Barbara Romack. Cuban authorities provided the passengers with lemonade, coffee, cigarettes, and pictures of Che Guevara and the plane was released after three hours. Rhodes surrendered in Spain on February 10, 1970. A January 4, 1971 hijacking charge against him is dismissed; he was committed to a mental institution; on July 8, 1971, he returns to prison; he is sentenced to 25 years for robbery on July 17, 1972.
28 April 1968
A Capitol Airways DC-8-31 (N1802) crashed at Atlantic City, New Jersey, United States during crew training due to crew error; all four crew survived, but the aircraft was written off.
29 June 1968
A KLM DC-8-53 on lease to Viasa (PH-DCH, named Orville Wright) was destroyed in a hangar fire at Schiphol Airport, Amsterdam, Netherlands. The fire was caused by an explosion in a fuel tank while the aircraft was being serviced.
1 July 1968
Seaboard World Airlines Flight 253A, a DC-8-63, was operating a military charter flight when it was forced to land on one of the Soviet-controlled Kuril Islands with all 238 Americans aboard being detained for two days.
2 August 1968
Alitalia Flight 660, a DC-8-43 (I-DIWF, named Antoniotto Usodimare) crashed northwest of Milan while on approach to Malpensa, Italy due to crew error, killing 12 of 95 on board.

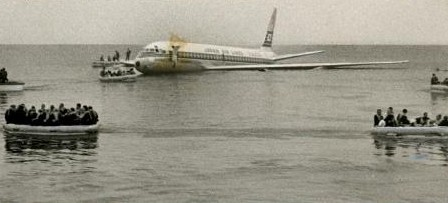
JAL Flight 2 22-November-1968

22 November 1968
Japan Airlines Flight 2, a DC-8-62 (named Shiga) crashed on landing in San Francisco Bay due to pilot error; all 107 on board survived. The aircraft was recovered 55 hours after the incident and repaired by United Airlines; it was returned to JAL (renamed Hidaka) on March 31, 1969, and remained in JAL service until 1983.
13 January 1969
Scandinavian Airlines System Flight 933, a DC-8-62 (named Sverre Viking), crashed in Santa Monica Bay while on approach to Los Angeles International Airport, California, United States due to poor CRM resulting in an unintentional descent. Fifteen of the 45 on board were killed.
17 October 1969
A Seaboard World Airlines DC-8-63CF (registration N8634) was destroyed by fire after it overran the runway at Oakland International Airport, California, United States following an aborted landing during a training flight; all five crew survived, but the aircraft was written off.

== 1970s ==
19 April 1970
Scandinavian Airlines System Flight 986, a DC-8-62 (SE-DBE, Anund Viking), was destroyed by fire at Fiumicino Airport, Rome, Italy while taxiing for take off after the no. 1 engine suffered an uncontained failure; all 65 on board survived.
5 July 1970
Air Canada Flight 621, a DC-8-63, crashed near Toronto Pearson International Airport in Brampton, Ontario, during a go-around after inadvertent deployment of the ground spoilers before touching down. All 109 on board were killed.
27 July 1970
Flying Tiger Line Flight 45, a DC-8-63AF (N785FT), crashed on approach to Naha Air Force Base, Okinawa, Japan due to excessive descent caused by crew error, killing the four crew.
8 September 1970
Trans International Airlines Flight 863, a DC-8-63CF (N4863T), was being ferried from New York City to Washington, DC when it crashed on takeoff from John F. Kennedy International Airport after a piece of asphalt became jammed in the right elevator causing a loss of control, killing the 11 crew.
13 September 1970
Swissair Flight 100, a DC-8-53 (HB-IDD), was hijacked after takeoff on September 6 and flown to Dawsons Field and blown up after the 155 people on board were released.
15 September 1970
Alitalia Flight 618, a DC-8-62 (I-DIWZ, named Gaetano Donizetti), crashed on landing at John F. Kennedy International Airport after the pilot selected reverse thrust on final approach following non-standard vectoring by ATC; all 156 on board survived, but the aircraft was written off.
27 November 1970
Capitol International Airways Flight C2C3/26, a DC-8-63CF (N4909C) crashed on takeoff from Anchorage International Airport after the landing gear wheels failed to rotate due to an unexplained brake problem (though a brake/hydraulic system malfunction or an engaged parking brake were suspected), killing 47 of 229 on board. The aircraft was operating a McChord AFB-Anchorage-Yokota-Can Ranh Bay service for the Military Airlift Command.

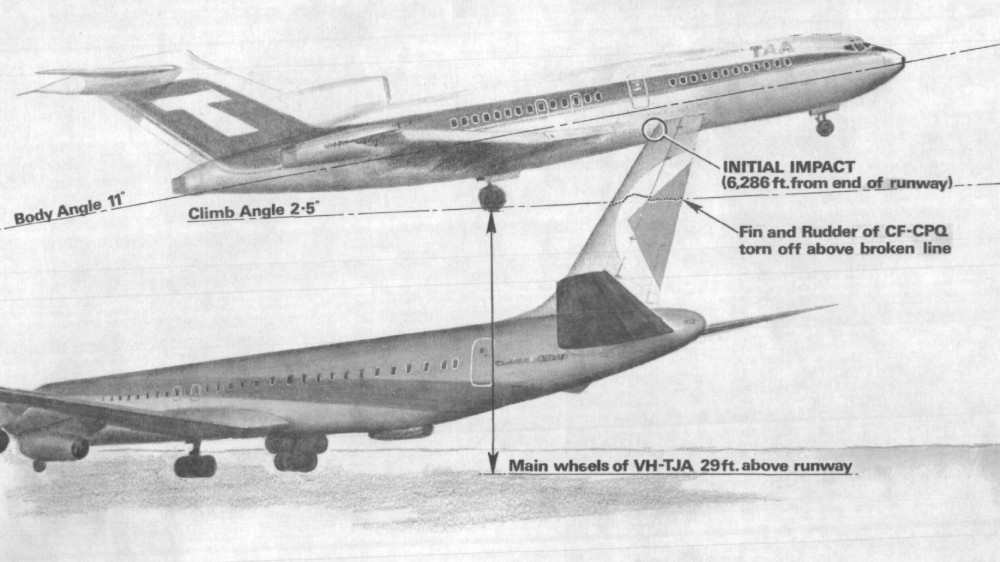
An illustration of the moment of collision between CF-CPQ and VH-TJA

29 January 1971
Canadian Pacific Air Lines Flight 301, a DC-8-63 (CF-CPQ) was struck while taxiing after landing by a Trans Australia Airlines Flight 592 (Boeing 727 VH-TJA) which had been cleared for take-off despite the runway not yet being clear. The DC-8 suffered major damage to its tail and the 727 a tear to its fuselage. The 727 was able to return and land safely and there were no deaths.
5 May 1972
Alitalia Flight 112, a DC-8-43 (I-DIWB, named Antonio Pigafetta), struck Mount Longa while on approach to Punta Raisi Airport after the crew deviated from approach procedures, killing all 115 on board. The crash remains Italy's worst single-aircraft disaster.
14 June 1972
Japan Airlines Flight 471, a DC-8-53 (JA8012, named Akan) crashed in the River Yamuna while on approach to Palam Airport, India, killing 86 of 89 on board and four on the ground. The cause was disputed, with Japanese investigators claiming a false glide path signal leading to a descent, while Indian investigators claimed a disregard of procedure.
6 July 1972
Aviaco Flight 331, a DC-8-52 (EC-ARA, named Velaquez) was being ferried from Madrid to Las Palmas when it crashed in the sea and sank 13 mi off Las Palmas, killing the 10 crew.
31 July 1972
Delta Air Lines Flight 841, a DC-8-51, was en route from Detroit to Miami when it was hijacked and flown to Boston, then Algeria, where authorities seized the plane without injuries.
24 September 1972
Japan Air Lines Flight 472, a DC-8-53 (JA8013, named Haruna), overran the runway on landing at Juhu Airport; all 122 on board survived, but the aircraft was written off. The pilot was cleared to land at Santacruz Airport but landed at Juhu Airport by mistake.
28 November 1972
Japan Airlines Flight 446, a DC-8-62 (JA8040, named Hida), crashed on takeoff from Sheremetyevo International Airport, Soviet Union (now Russia) due to crew error, killing 61 of 76 on board.
10 May 1973
A Thai Airways International DC-8-33 (HS-TGU, named Srisubhan) overran the runway on landing at Tribhuvan International Airport, killing one person on the ground; all 110 on board the DC-8 survived.
21 June 1973
Air Canada Flight 890, a DC-8-53 (CF-TIJ), was destroyed by fire during refueling at Toronto International Airport.
23 June 1973
Loftleidir Flight 509, DC-8-61 (N8960T), was involved in a landing accident due to inadvertent deployment of the ground spoilers in flight.
8 September 1973
World Airways Flight 802, a DC-8-63CF (N802WA) operating on a cargo flight for the Military Airlift Command, crashed into high ground while on approach to Cold Bay Airport, Alaska. All six people on board were killed.
23 March 1974
An Airlift International DC-8-63CF (N6164A) was destroyed by fire while being serviced at Travis Air Force Base, killing one.
4 December 1974
Martinair Flight 138, a DC-8-55F (PH-MBH) crashed into Seven Virgin Mountain Range in Sri Lanka due to crew error. All 191 on board were killed. The aircraft was on lease to Garuda Indonesia.
18 March 1976
Cubana de Aviación Flight 455, a DC-8-43 (CU-T1200), collided in mid-air with an Antonov An-24 (CU-T879) near Havana; the An-24 struck the wing of the DC-8 and crashed, killing all five on board; the DC-8 landed safely with no casualties to the 29 on board. The DC-8 was on lease from Air Canada.
6 October 1976
Cubana de Aviación Flight 455, a DC-8-43 (CU-T1201), crashed in the sea a few minutes after departing from Grantley Adams International Airport after a bomb exploded on board. All 78 on board were killed in the worst air disaster in Barbados.

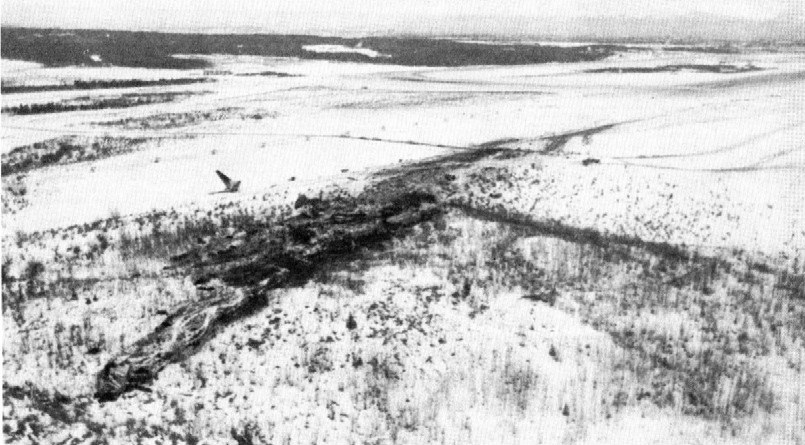
Japan Air Lines Flight 1045 remains

13 January 1977
Japan Air Lines Cargo Flight 1045, a Japan Air Lines DC-8-62AF (JA8054) crashed on climbout from Anchorage International Airport due to pilot error, killing all five on board. The pilot was found to have been drunk.
4 March 1977
An Overseas National Airways DC-8-63CF (N8635) crashed short of the runway at Niamey Airport, killing two of the four crew; the aircraft was operating for UTA French Airlines.
18 April 1977
Philippine Air Lines Flight 421, a DC-8-53 (RP-C803), when during takeoff at Haneda, Japan it lifted off prematurely, banked, touched down, and ran off the runway tearing off the undercarriage and all four engines. There were no fatalities, however the aircraft was written off. The cause was traced to failures in the left elevator and gust lock.
27 September 1977
Japan Airlines Flight 715, a DC-8-62 (JA8051), crashed near Subang International Airport due to pilot error, killing 34 of 79 on board.
11 December 1977
A Charlotte Aircraft Corporation DC-8-33F (N8170A) was destroyed by fire while being refueled at Lake City, Florida, United States.
18 December 1977
United Airlines Flight 2860, a DC-8-54F (N8047U), crashed in the Wasatch Mountains, Utah, due to ATC and crew errors and an unexplained electrical failure, killing the three crew.
3 March 1978
Iberia Flight 575, a DC-8-63 (EC-BMX), slid off the runway on landing at Santiago de Compostela Airport; all 222 on board survived, but the aircraft was written off.
15 November 1978
Icelandic Airlines Flight 001, a DC-8-63CF (TF-FLA), crashed short of the runway at Katunayake International Airport after the crew deviated from procedure, killing 183 of 262 on board.
28 December 1978
United Airlines Flight 173, a DC-8-61 (N8082U), crashed near Portland, Oregon due to fuel exhaustion after the crew became preoccupied with a landing gear problem, killing 10 of 189 on board.

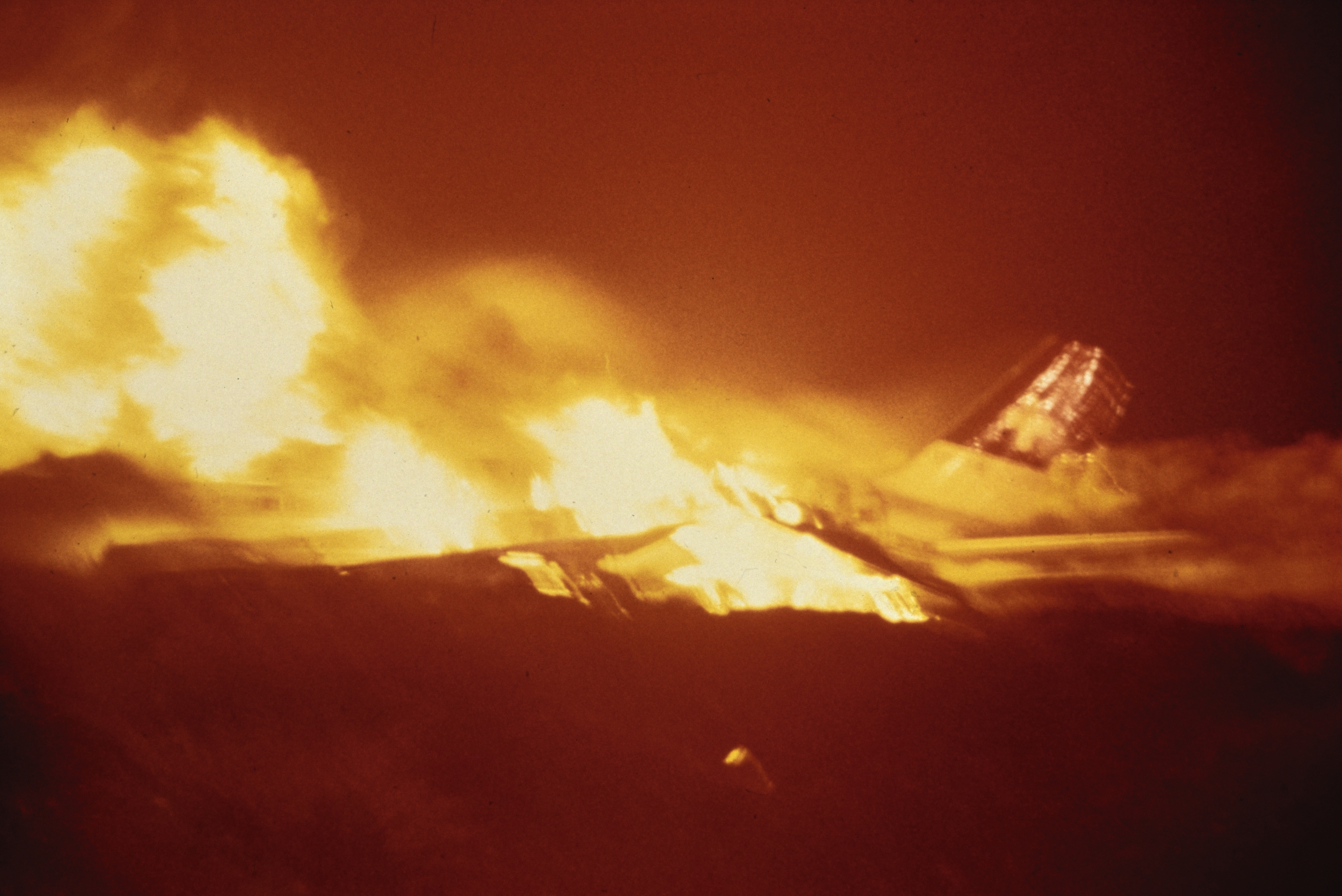
Swissair Flight 316 burning

7 October 1979
Swissair Flight 316 overran the runway on landing at Ellinikon Airport due to crew error, killing 14 Passengers of 154 Passengers and crew on board.

== 1980s ==
1 August 1980
Aeronaves del Peru DC-8-40 OB-R-1143 named San Martin de Porres crashed at Cerro Lilio in Mexico.
12 September 1980
Leased DC-8-33F N715UA of Aeronaves del Peru crashed at Iquitos, Peru.
15 January 1981
Overseas National Airways DC-8-61 N913R on lease to Saudia was destroyed in a hangar fire in Luxembourg.
9 February 1982
Japan Air Lines DC-8-61 JA8061 was operating Flight 350 when it was deliberately crashed by the captain on approach to Haneda Airport. Twenty-four of the 174 on board were killed.
17 September 1982
Japan Air Lines DC-8-61 JA8048, named Hidaka, while operating Flight 792, suffered a mechanical malfunction shortly after takeoff, then made an emergency landing but overshot the runway at Shanghai Hongqiao International Airport. The plane was damaged beyond repair. 39 of 223 on board were injured.
11 January 1983
DC-8-54F N8053U operating United Airlines Flight 2885 crashed on departure from Detroit as a result on an unauthorized seat switch between the copilot and the flight engineer who was in control of the aircraft. The plane crashed 30 seconds after takeoff.
10 March 1984
Union de Transports Aeriens DC-8-63PF F-BOLL was destroyed by a bomb at Ndjamena, Chad.
18 September 1984
AECA Aeroservicios Ecuatorianos Flight 767-103 DC-8-55F HC-BKN crashed on takeoff from Quito, Ecuador.
18 September 1984
LAC Columbia DC-8-53 HK-2380 named Capt Luis C Donaldo V was damaged beyond repair after leaving the runway at Barranquilla, Colombia.
12 December 1985
Arrow Air DC-8-63CF N950JW was operating Flight 1285 when it crashed on departure from Gander, Newfoundland. All 256 on board were killed.
31 March 1988
Arax Airlines DC-8-55F 5N-ARH named Captain Ernie Trapaga crashed on departure from Cairo, Egypt.
7 June 1989
Surinam Airways DC-8-62 N1809E named Anthony Nesty was operating Flight 764 when it crashed on approach to Paramaribo, Surinam. 176 of the 187 on board were killed.
10 August 1989
APISA Air Carga DC-8-33F OB-T1316 named Jesus es Senor was damaged beyond repair after leaving the runway at Iquitos, Peru.

== 1990s ==
12 March 1991
Air Transport International DC-8-62 N730PL was destroyed by fire on takeoff from JFK Airport, New York, United States.
11 July 1991
Nationair Canada DC-8-61 C-GMXQ crashed on departure from Jeddah, Saudi Arabia. It was operating as Nigeria Airways Flight 2120 and all 261 on board were killed, making it the deadliest DC-8 crash.
15 February 1992
MK Air Cargo DC-8-54F 9G-MKB crashed on approach to Kano, Nigeria.
15 February 1992
Air Transport International Flight 805 (operated for Burlington Air Express) DC-8-63 N794AL crashed on approach to Toledo Express Airport, Ohio, United States.
18 August 1993
American International Airways Flight 808, a DC-8-61 N814CK crashed while on approach to Guantanamo Bay when the plane banked to over 90 degrees.
16 February 1995
Air Transport International Flight 782 DC-8-63F N782AL crashed on take-off at Kansas City, Missouri, United States, killing all 3 people on board.
28 April 1995
Millon Air Flight 705, a DC-8-54F N43UA C/n 45677/199 overran the landing runway at La Aurora Intl. Airport at Guatemala City. The runway was wet.
4 February 1996
LAC Colombia Flight 028, a DC-8-55CF HK-3979 crashed after take-off at Asuncion, Paraguay due to a collision against the ground (with post-impact fire) due to loss of control of the aircraft in flight.
22 December 1996
Airborne Express Flight 827 DC-8-63F crashed into the side of the mountain in Narrows, Virginia, United States while conducting tests after going through an overhaul and receiving major modifications. The plane was destroyed by the crash and fire and the 3 crew members and 3 technicians aboard were killed.
7 August 1997
Fine Air Flight 101, a DC-8-61F registration N27UA, crashed on departure from Miami International Airport onto NW 72nd Avenue less than a mile (1.6 km) from the airport. The freight pallets were loaded out of sequence, creating a center of gravity issue, causing the aircraft to stall.

== 2000s ==
16 February 2000
A Emery Worldwide DC-8-71F, registration N8079U, operating Flight 17, crashed after takeoff from Sacramento Mather Airport killing all three crewmembers due to a right elevator control tab detaching during takeoff due to faulty maintenance resulting in a loss of pitch control.

26 April 2001
Emery Worldwide (DC-8-71, registration N8076U) landed with a left main landing gear up at Nashville International Airport in Nashville, Tennessee. The aircraft sustained minor damage and the three crew-members were not injured. Post-accident investigation found improper maintenance to the left main landing gear was at fault.

7 February 2006
UPS Airlines Flight 1307, cargo fire on landing approach to Philadelphia and resultant hull loss, no fatalities.

== 2010s ==
11 August 2010
Douglas DC-8-63F YA-VIC of Afghanistan's Kam Air suffered a tailstrike on take-off, destroying an approach light. The aircraft was operating an international cargo flight from Manston to Buenos Aires via the Cape Verde Islands. The incident was caused by excess fuel, and an underestimation of the mass of the cargo, making the aircraft 25,700 pounds (11,700 kg) overweight. After being informed of the tailstrike, the crew continued the flight to the Cape Verde Islands. Inspection on arrival revealed that a tailstrike had indeed occurred, although the tailstrike indicator was within limits.

== 2020s ==
8 September 2026
The 9S-AJO Douglas DC-8-70 operated by Trans Air Cargo Service suffered a gear collapse and subsequent runway excursion during takeoff at Kinshasa N'djili International Airport, Democratic Republic of the Congo. The aircraft had performed a cargo flight from Mbuji Mayi Airport. Local authorities suspect that an hydraulic failure caused the accident. The aircraft received substantial damage.
