= Flight 827 =

Flight 827 may refer to

- Air Rhodesia Flight 827, shot down on 12 February 1979
- Airborne Express Flight 827, crashed on 22 December 1996
