= Flight 782 =

Flight 782 may refer to:

- Air Transport International Flight 782, crashed on 16 February 1995
- Adam Air Flight 782, made an emergency landing on 11 February 2006
