= LAC Colombia Flight 028 =

1996 aircraft accident in Paraguay

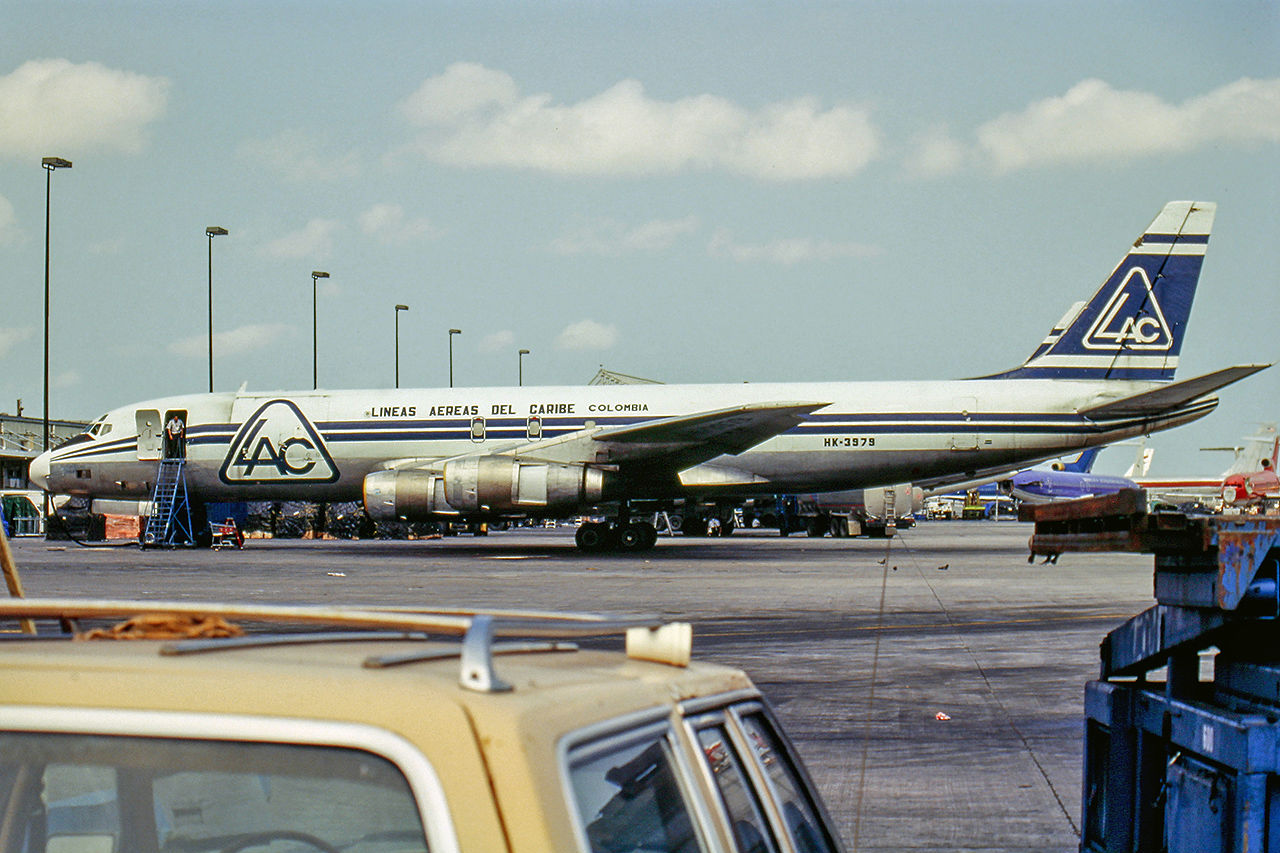
- HK-3979, the aircraft involved in the accident, pictured in 1995

Accident
- Date: February 4, 1996
- Summary: Loss of control and stall caused by pilot error
- Site: Mariano Roque Alonso, near Silvio Pettirossi International Airport, Luque, Paraguay
- Total fatalities: 22
- Total injuries: 2

Aircraft
- Aircraft type: Douglas DC-8-55CF
- Operator: LAC Colombia
- IATA flight No.: LC028
- ICAO flight No.: LCI028
- Call sign: LAC 028
- Registration: HK-3979
- Flight origin: Silvio Pettirossi International Airport, Luque, Paraguay
- Destination: Campinas International Airport
- Occupants: 4
- Passengers: 1
- Crew: 3
- Fatalities: 4
- Survivors: 0

Ground casualties
- Ground fatalities: 18
- Ground injuries: 2

LAC Colombia Flight 028 was a scheduled cargo flight that took off from Silvio Pettirossi International Airport in Luque, Paraguay and was bound for Campinas International Airport in Campinas, Brazil. It is the deadliest aviation accident to occur in Paraguay. The crash was caused by the pilot improperly ceding control to the co-pilot shortly after takeoff, then turning off two of the engines to hinder operation of the plane by the co-pilot.

On February 4, 1996, at 14:12 local time, the plane, a 29-year-old Douglas DC-8 of the now-defunct Colombian airline Líneas Aéreas del Caribe (LAC) stalled and crashed in a neighborhood in the district of Mariano Roque Alonso, about ten kilometres (6.2 mi) north of Paraguay's capital Asunción, a few minutes after takeoff. The crash killed 22 people: the 4 crew members, along with 18 people on the ground, mostly children who were playing on a soccer field. There were also several injuries and damage to several houses in the surrounding area.

== Aircraft and accident ==
The aircraft involved was a McDonnell Douglas DC-8-55CF operated by LAC Colombia. It was built in September 1966 and was originally delivered to Japan Air Lines in 1966 as JA8018. It was later delivered to Aeronaves del Peru as OB-R-1200. In 1994 the aircraft was delivered to LAC Colombia as HK-2632. It was later re-registered to HK-3979.

At the time of the crash, the weather was reported as good, and visibility was optimal. The aircraft was also in excellent technical condition while carrying adequate fuel. The aircraft took off around 2:30 p.m. from Luque Airport, bound for Campinas.

A few minutes after takeoff, the pilot gave control of the plane to his co-pilot, a novice, and began to test the engines. One of the left engines was first turned off, causing the aircraft to bank. Another engine was then turned off at 500 feet. The co-pilot was heard asking the other pilots to stop joking "that way", as the co-pilot retook control of the plane and attempted to climb with two engines turned off.

Subsequently, two carburetion explosions were heard, indicating that the aircraft was forced to climb so that no air could enter the other engines, meaning that the engines could not operate at full power. When they tried to reactivate the two engines, the pilots did not react in time, given that the aircraft had not yet gained much altitude.

The plane fell to the ground, crashing into a playing field around two kilometres (1.2 mi) from the end of the runway in the Mariano Roque Alonso district a few minutes after takeoff. The four Colombian crew members died instantly after the crash, along with 18 other people who died on the ground, 13 of whom were children playing soccer in the playing field in which the plane had crashed. The crash severely damaged the airline's reputation and finances, leading to the airline ending operations later that year.

== Investigation ==
The investigation was carried out by the aeronautical authorities of Colombia (Special Administrative Unit of Civil Aeronautics), Paraguay and the United States (NTSB). After investigators analyzed the flight recorders that recorded the crew's conversations and movements of the plane in the last minutes of the flight, they concluded that the accident was due to pilot error.

The main error occurred when the pilot improperly gave control of the plane to the co-pilot, a prohibited procedure that made the aircraft operation difficult for the co-pilot. Both the pilots and the flight engineer had reportedly expressed excessive confidence about the conditions of the surrounding environment.

The final report came out in 1997, around a year after the crash, concluded the following:

1. Little experience of the pilot in command in this function.
2. Lack of flight safety doctrine in the cockpit at all pre-flight times.
3. Probable execution of unauthorized take-off training under uncontrolled conditions and by a person not qualified as an instructor.
4. Probable lack of knowledge of the flight characteristics with an empty aircraft on the part of the crew.

The "Probable Cause" section stated the following:

Violent collision with the ground followed by post-impact fire, caused by loss of control of the aircraft during flight. This loss of control originated from procedures incorrectly executed by the crew during the critical phase of takeoff, which resulted in an extremely adverse configuration of the aircraft for that phase of flight. This configuration could not be counteracted, leading to a loss of control, a significant reduction in speed, and subsequent loss of lift.

== See also ==
- Airborne Express Flight 827, a DC-8 crash on the same year that crashed in similar circumstances
- Air Transport International Flight 782
