= Aerocosta =

Colombian cargo airline (1965–1976)

| IATA | ICAO | Call sign |
|---|---|---|
| - | CC | AERO |
- Founded: July 12, 1965
- Commenced operations: June 1967
- Ceased operations: 1976
- Hubs: Soledad International Airport
- Focus cities: Barranquilla, Bogotá, Cali, Cartagena, Medellín, San Andrés
- Fleet size: 7
- Destinations: Miami, Panama, Martinique, Guadeloupe, Barranquilla, Bogotá, Cali, Cartagena, Medellín, and San Andrés
- Parent company: Floramerica
- Headquarters: Were located inside Miami
- Key people: Captain Rafael Ángel Visbal Rosales, Captain Luis Carlos Donado Velilla, Enrique Oswaldo Fajardo, Antonio and Alfonso Ballestas, Herman Olarte and Joaquín del Gordo

Aerocosta (Aerovías de la Costa S.A., Aerocosta) was a Colombian air company that transported cargo from 1965 to 1976. It had major stockholders, consisting of Floramerica (40%), Robert Camacho (25%) and private investors.

== History ==
Aerocosta was founded in the city of Barranquilla on July 12, 1965, and began operating itinerary services in June 1967, serving the national territory with Curtiss C-46 aircraft. The company's headquarters were opened at the international airport in Miami, from where international flights with a Curtiss C-46 were opened in the direction of Panama City and Barranquilla in Central and South America, respectively. The founders of the new company were Captain Rafael Ángel Visbal Rosales, Captain Luis Carlos Donado Velilla, Enrique Oswaldo Fajardo, Antonio and Alfonso Ballestas, Herman Olarte and Joaquín del Gordo. The first plane was registered as HK-792 and also operated charter flights to Miami and then established regular services via San Andres.

At the start of 1969, a foreign carrier permit was issued to Aerocosta, authorizing them to engage in foreign air transportation of cargo between Colombia and Miami, and to operate off-route charter trips of property pursuant to part 212 of the American Board of Air Economic Regulations. By the end of 1969, three additional units had been received, which were registered as HK-1281, HK-1282 and later HK-1383. The company further expanded its fleet by acquiring Douglas DC-6 aircraft. In July 1970, the company acquired the three aircraft from the Aerocóndor airline, which were converted to freighters at the Barranquilla airport. With the acquisition of the HK-752, HK-754 and HK-756 services were expanded and by then, regular services were offered from Barranquilla to Bogotá, Cali, Cartagena, Medellin, San Andres, Miami, Panama, Martinique, Guadeloupe and other points of the Caribbean. An additional aircraft, the HK-1291 was received in September of that year.

In the early 1970s, the first of a total of five Douglas DC-6 freighters arrived at Aerocosta, which meant that there was nothing to stand in the way of expansion. So Bogota, Cali, Medellin, San Andres and Cartagena were found in the company's flight plan. In 1970, Floramerica accounted for nearly all of Colombia's cut flower exports out of the country. Floramerica, the former investor was the leading flower exporter in Colombia. Many companies around this time started to use Floramerica's ideas and designs for making it all. The only thing that stood in the way for Floramerica's success was transporting the cut flowers. Floramerica and another company Jardines de los Andes, urged air cargo companies to ship their cut flowers. Aerocosta was the first company to ship their flowers on routes to Miami from various locations in Colombia. Aerocosta then failed and Floramerica had to scramble for a new carrier because not even Avianca wanted to ship cut flowers.

Occasionally, Lockheed Electra aircraft were chartered in order to offer more capacity on flights to Miami, among them, the one identified with registration N and eventually an own Electra was acquired. The company achieved a 15.97% share in the export load in 1971 by transporting more than 1,492,868 kilos. In that same year, it achieved 28.13% by transporting 4,525,891 kilos of import cargo, being second in the market. Being a purely cargo company, it managed to become the most important in the field and competed strongly with Avianca. This is why Aerocosta prided itself on being “The Largest Airline of Colombia Specialized in Cargo”.

For 1972 an additional Douglas DC-6 was acquired first, HK-1294, and then another followed a year later called HK-1360. By then, the Donado Velilla brothers decided to become independent and create a new company by themselves and distanced away from the company. They decided to negotiate with the rest of the shareholders the acquisition of the two Curtiss C-46 of the company, the HK-1282 and the HK-1383. With them they started the operation, but always protected by the Aerocosta company, until the foundation of the company Lineas Aéreas del Caribe. With the departure of the Donados brothers, Roberto Camacho was appointed as the new president of Aerocosta.

=== Downfall ===
On July 10, 1975, the airline suffered another loss when an Electra cargo plane from Aerocóndor took off from El Dorado Airport, went into emergency and fell on an Aerocosta DC-6 that was in front of its hangar, where it was in the process of receiving a wide door to improve cargo access. The engineer Milciades Visbal, brother of the Captain, was in charge of this work. The HK-756, which was owned by Captain Visbal and affiliated with the company, was consumed by the flames in the wake of the accident. On July 10, 1975, a Douglas DC-6F was acquired by Aerocosta from a private owner. In October 1975, a Lockheed Electra freighter aircraft with registration HK-1809 was acquired to compete on equal terms with Aerocondor aircraft. However, the loss of the DC-6, together with a series of financial problems forced the company to suspend operations definitively in 1976. The competition on the route to Miami by Avianca and Aerocóndor, so that the operation was not profitable. The DC-6 HK-1291 owned by Captain Visbal, was then affiliated with the Aerosucre company. Then the company was dissolved in 1976 because it had no planes and no routes to take.

In Ernesto Cortissoz airport due the increment of the drug traffic from La Guajira and the augment of the contraband from clandestine runways. The Colombian Air force, without wait constructed a new Air Base. The Air Force command, across the Rotatory Found, negotiated and bought it on a cost of 2 million pesos, the administrative installations and the parking platform of the Aerocosta company had to cancel its operation there in Ernesto Cortissoz airport and the section of air installations plan were executed to the renewal of these installations to lodge an Air Group in Ernesto Cortissoz airport. These events happened after Aerocosta shut down and was selling its properties.

== Fleet ==
Aerocosta operated the following aircraft during operations:

- (*)=signifies a plane that crashed during service.

Aerocosta operated fleet
| Aircraft | Registration number | Notes |
|---|---|---|
| (*)Douglas DC-6F | HK-756 | A Lockheed Electra operated by Aerovias Condor (HK-1976) suddenly veered to the right shortly after lift-off from runway 12. The Electra sank back and crashed into DC-6 HK-756 on the ground. Fire destroyed both aircraft. |
| Douglas DC-6 | HK-752 | This aircraft was built in 1948 and was acquired by Aerocosta in July 1972. |
| Douglas DC-6A | HK-1294 | The Aircraft was built in January 1954 for the Flying Tigers as N34958. It then served for Aerocosta from February 1972 until it was withdrawn in June 1976. |
| (*)Curtiss C-46F | HK-1383 | Cruising at 288 mph, the first engine caught fire. The fire extinguishing systems was activated and the propeller was feathered. Somehow the propeller didn't feather and began overspeeding. To prevent the Curtiss airplane from stalling, the pilot put the aircraft in a dive. After jettisoning some cargo, the plane was ditched and sank within 4 minutes. |
| Douglas DC-6F | HK-754 | This aircraft was built in March 1948 as a pure DC-6 short fuselage passenger aircraft for KLM as PH-TPI. The aircraft was then sold in 1964 to Aerocosta. It was then converted to a freighter and operated by Aerocosta from July 1970 until withdrawn in August 1972. |
| (*)Douglas DC-7BF | HK-1300 | The aircraft also was damaged beyond repair by a fire. The aircraft was leased from Aeronorte Colombia. |
| Douglas DC-6B | HK-1360 | The aircraft was built in 1952, acquired in 1972, and sold to Trans Mediterranean Airlines. |
| (*)Curtiss C-46D | HK-792 | The Curtiss crashed and caught fire during an emergency landing. |
| Douglas DC-6B | HK-1291 | It was built in 1957 and bought by Aerocosta in September 1970. |
| (*)Curtiss C-46D | HK-1281 | The C-46 cargo plane, HK-1281, departed to Santa Marta Airport, in Colombia at 12:11 on a flight to Guadeloupe. The airplane carried 5000 kg of carcasses. Estimated time of arrival at Guadeloupe was 17:55. Last position report was at 14°58'N, 64W, flying at 7000 feet. It was then found it crashed. |
| Curtiss C-46D-15-CU | HK-1282 | It was built in 1945 and passed through several owners such as LAC Colombia and Aerosucre. It went into service for a brief time in 1972 and 1973. |

== Accidents ==
- A Curtiss C-46 aircraft, registered as HK-1281 had an emergency landing at Barranquilla airport on April 4, 1970. As a result of this accident, the ship was declared a total loss. A few months later, another Curtiss, this time the HK-792 suffered an accident at the Point-a-Pitre airport in Guadeloupe on October 28. The crew reported problems in one of the engines and the plane crashed while attempting to land emergency. Moments later a fire started that completely consumed the aircraft. All occupants, three crew members and a companion died in the accidents.
- A new accident was recorded on October 26, 1973, when HK-1383 fell into the sea when it made a flight between Barranquilla to the island of San Andres, under the command of Captain Fernando León and the "Guajiro" Duran. The plane's crew had reported an emergency when the number one engine ran out and requested authorization to land in Cartagena in an emergency; however he had to moor twenty miles off the coast. Before performing this maneuver there was a need to dump the cargo in flight that consisted of chickens in crates and furniture. However, it was not possible to lighten the aircraft, and the aircraft subsequently landed on the sea. A large storefront served as a lifeline for the three crewmen who were unharmed. The plane sank into the depths.

As a cause of the accident, a fire in one of the engines and the inability to turn it off, led to critical flight conditions over the sea. Among other factors the overload on the plane was discovered in being more than 1200 kilos and the lack of knowledge of this situation led to the crashing of that plane. Floramerica became the majority partner of the company and was given a new corporate image with a logo change. Rafael McCausland Osio was then appointed the president of Aerocosta after those incidents.

== See also ==
- Barranquilla
- List of airlines of Colombia
- List of defunct airlines of Colombia
