= Capitol International Airways Flight C2C3/26 =

1970 aviation accident in Alaska, US

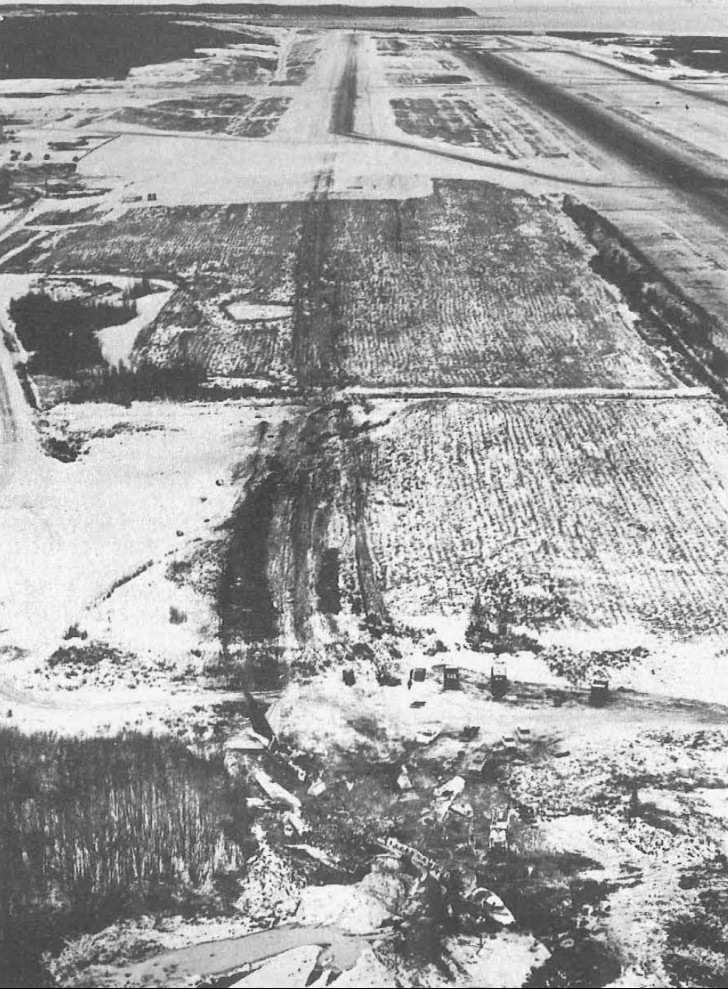
- The wreckage of the DC-8 after the overrun

Accident
- Date: 27 November 1970
- Summary: Runway overrun due to an unintended landing gear brake deployment resulting in weaker acceleration
- Site: Ted Stevens Anchorage International Airport, Anchorage, Alaska, United States; 61°10′4.4″N 149°56′12.6″W

Aircraft
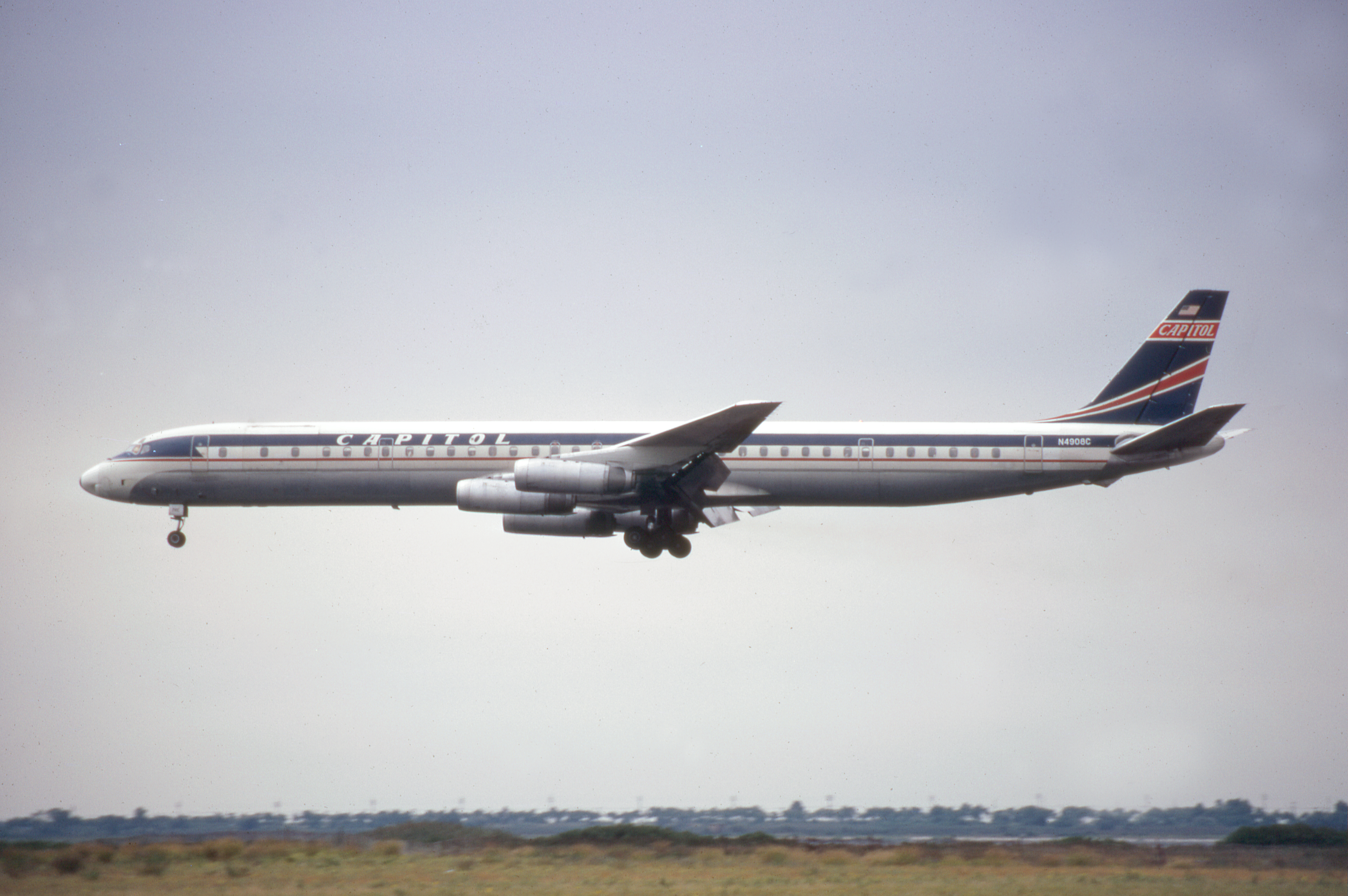
- A Capitol McDonnell Douglas DC-8, similar to that involved in the accident
- Aircraft type: McDonnell Douglas DC-8-63CF
- Operator: Capitol International Airways
- Registration: N4909C
- Flight origin: McChord Field, Tacoma, United States
- 1st stopover: Ted Stevens Anchorage International Airport, Anchorage, Alaska, United States
- Last stopover: Yokota Air Base, Western Tokyo, Japan
- Destination: Cam Ranh Bay, Southern Vietnam
- Occupants: 229
- Passengers: 219
- Crew: 10
- Fatalities: 47
- Injuries: 49
- Survivors: 182

Capitol International Airways Flight C2C3/26 was a chartered Douglas DC-8 Military Airlift Command (MAC) contract flight operated by Capitol Air (then known as Capitol International Airways) from McChord Field in Tacoma to Cam Ranh Bay in Southern Vietnam via stopovers at Anchorage and at Yokota Air Base in Japan. The aircraft crashed after a botched take-off attempt from Runway 06R at Ted Stevens Anchorage International Airport on November 27, 1970. Of the 229 people aboard the jet, 47 perished due to the post-crash fire with 49 people injured.

The National Transportation Safety Board conducted an investigation into the accident. It released its final report on March 29, 1972, and concluded that the probable cause of the accident was the unintended deployment of the brakes on the landing gear which reduced the acceleration of the aircraft preventing rotation. The cause of the brake deployment was disputed, either due to a faulty brake hydraulic system or an inadvertently engaged parking brake.

== Background of the flight ==
The Vietnam War was an ongoing battle between North Vietnam and the North-Vietnamese-backed Viet Cong, and Southern Vietnam, which had been taking place since 1955. North Vietnam was supported by the Soviet Union and China while South Vietnam stood by a coalition led by the United States and supported by South Korea, Thailand, Australia, the Philippines, New Zealand and Taiwan.

The United States had a large number of its troops situated in Vietnam during the war; by January 1969, approximately 543,400 U.S. Army soldiers were stationed in South Vietnam. Commercial aircraft from civil airlines were used for the transportation of U.S. troops. The United States Department of Defense awarded the charter contracts through public tenders. Capitol International Airways had been awarded the contract to transport military personnel on behalf of the Military Airlift Command from McChord Air Force Base, south of Tacoma to Cam Ranh Bay.

Capitol International Airways planned to use a McDonnell Douglas DC-8 to perform the trip to transport 219 military personnel with stopovers for refueling in Anchorage and at Yokota Air Base.

== Aircraft and crew ==
=== Aircraft ===
The aircraft was a one-year old McDonnell Douglas DC-8-63. It was delivered and leased to the airline on July 2, 1969. The airliner had accumulated 4,944 flight hours with its last maintenance check on the day before with the wheel and tire assemblies for Brakes 1, 2, 4, 6, 7 and 8 replaced and the brake assembly for Brake 3 was replaced. The preceding year showed no discrepancies whatsoever with the landing gear or the hydraulics in the vicinity of N4909C apart from regular wear-and-tear. However, an incident was noted when the main landing gear was pulled beyond its external limit during maintenance.

=== Crew ===
Flight C2C3/26 was piloted by:

- Captain William G. Reid (aged 48) who had accumulated approximately 14,650 flying hours, of which included 5,740 flying hours in the DC-8.
- First Officer James A. Downs (aged 55) who had accumulated approximately 13,500 flying hours of experience, of which included 2,057 flying hours in the DC-8.
- Flight Engineer Edward W. Fink (aged 41) who had accumulated approximately 10,000 flying hours of experience, of which included 2,000 flying hours in the DC-8.
- Flight Navigator Robert D. Leonard (aged 53) who had accumulated approximately 14,000 flying hours of experience, of which included 2,500 flying hours in the DC-8.

== Flight ==
Capitol International Airways Flight C2C3/26 was a chartered contract flight by the Military Airlift Command (MAC) from McChord Field in Tacoma to Cam Ranh Bay in Southern Vietnam via stopovers at Anchorage and Yokota. It was scheduled to transport 213 military personnel and 6 military dependents. The flight departed from McChord AFB at 12:04 Alaskan Standard Time, on its way to Ted Stevens. The flight touched down at Anchorage at 15:32. During the flight, the only indications of disorders with the aircraft was a noticeably higher amplitude generated which was indicated by the Airborne Vibration Monitor (AVM) and an unreliable Engine Pressure Ratio (EPR), both detected on Engine #1 (left-outermost engine). A service was done on the engine and it was noted that the EPR on engine one was malfunctioning, though no other discrepancies were noticed. The captain also stated that the braking action was marginal and had to deploy thrust reversers to stop the aircraft. A Boeing 727 pilot landed on Runway 06R at Anchorage and informed the air traffic controller about fair braking action.

Before the aircraft was taken off its chocks, it was de-iced due to a light freezing drizzle noted by the surface weather report:

- 15:45 – Local, estimated 500 feet broken, 2,500 feet overcast, visibility 5 miles, very light freezing drizzle, fog, wind 060° @ 9 knots, altimeter setting 30.01 inches.
- 17:05 – Record Special, measured 400 feet broken, 1,700 feet overcast, visibility 5 miles, very light freezing drizzle, fog, sea level pressure 1016.1 millibars, temperature 23 °F., dew point 22'°F., wind 050° @ 8 knots, altimeter setting 29.98 inches.

The flight departed at 17:02 Alaskan Standard Time on Runway 06R (10,900 ft long and 150 ft wide). Since the EPR on Engine #1 was malfunctioning, the crew attained a relatively stable engine pressure ratio by aligning the #2 engine's RPM, fuel flow, and exhaust gas temperature (BGT) indicators to correspond with those values obtained on the other three engines. The plane accelerated for take-off. When the aircraft reached V_{1} speed (138 knots), the crew reported an unusually sluggish acceleration. When the crew reached V_{R} speed (153 knots), an attempt to take-off was conducted as the aircraft was accelerating at a consistent rate. However, the landing gear failed to rotate, therefore sealing the aircraft to the ground. Two U.S. Air Force passengers and eyewitnesses on the ground reported that as the aircraft passed approximately 2,000 to 3,000 ft of the runway, a series of loud reports were heard which were believed to be the tires on the DC-8 blowing out while none of the crew members recalled hearing any abnormalities associated with the landing gear. The crew tried to bring the plane to a halt but they were unsuccessful in doing so.

The contract flight impacted a four-by-four wooden fence 675 feet past the runway and an ILS localizer 1,002 feet past the runway on its left wing. A third impact soon followed, breaking open the fuselage and shearing off the right wing and subsequently leaking out fuel from it. It skidded to a halt in a 12 feet deep drainage ditch, 3,400 ft past Runway 06R with the break-out of a fire at the left wing, killing 46 passengers and a stewardess while leaving the cockpit area and the aft fuselage of the airframe intact. 43 passengers and 6 other stewardesses suffered severe burn injuries. Past only 560 feet of the runway, were several fragments of the landing gear tires.

== Investigation ==
A formal investigation was conducted by the National Transportation Safety Board with the release of the board's final report and the delivery of two recommendation letters to the Federal Aviation Administration on March 29, 1972. The Cockpit Voice recorder was irretrievable. The Flight Data Recorder, however, was relatively free of damage. An examination of the Flight Data Recorder revealed that the aircraft was at a heading of 064° for 1 minute and 34 seconds. Thereafter, a slight left bank to 058° following a right bank to 062° was observed with an increase of 50 knots of airspeed. Since there was extreme skepticism with the landing gear brakes per the evidence available, the NTSB first pondered upon several parts of the landing gear though most of them severed due to the flames. A microscopic examination of the wheel bearings and the brake assemblies of the landing gear was conducted, but the test showed no discrepancies with them whatsoever.

As mentioned earlier, the crew reported an "unusually sluggish takeoff". The time normally taken for a DC-8 to attain V_{1} speed is 39.2 seconds, covering a distance of 4,500 feet. On the accident flight, according to the Flight Data Recorder, it took 60 seconds, covering 7,700 feet.

The National Transportation Safety Board questioned several major DC-8 operators on whether they experienced any unusual fault with the braking system of the landing gear. While most operators did not, some did complain about a slow or incomplete locking of the brakes mainly due to hydraulic issues and otherwise, due to a malfunction in the anti-skid control valve or suspected air locks. The board then turned its eye towards the tire assemblies. While Flight C2C3/26 was holding in position and waiting for clearance to take-off, trails generated by the left main landing gear when the heat of the tires caused the ice on it to melt with it being cause most likely due to the time taken of the aircraft taxiing from the terminal to the runway. However, the trails was only seen on the left main landing gear. The right main landing gear revealed no evidence of the formation of a footprint which was possibly caused due to the uneven icing on Runway 06R at Anchorage.

The final report concludes that the probable cause of the accident was the unintentional braking force applied to the landing gear, causing it to remain locked and therefore, inadvertently decelerating the plane into a ditch. Per the report, the braking system was the main suspect of the accident, however, the reason for which the brakes applied the unnecessary braking force to the landing gear was not determined and the possible sources for this braking force was either a malfunction in the hydraulics or the braking system or the parking brake being inadvertently engaged.

The National Transportation Safety Board assigned two recommendations to the Federal Aviation Administration which were as follows:

- Determine and implement takeoff procedures that will provide the flight crew with time or distance reference to appraise the aircraft's acceleration to V_{1} speed.
- Initiate action to incorporate in its airworthiness requirements, a provision for fuel system fire safety devices which will be effective in the prevention and control of both in-flight and post-crash fuel system fires and explosions.

== See also ==
- World Airways Flight 802, another chartered Military Airlift Command DC-8 which crashed three years later, also in Alaska
- Arrow Air Flight 1285R, another chartered Military DC-8 which crashed on take-off
