= Mount Dutton =

Mountain in Alaska

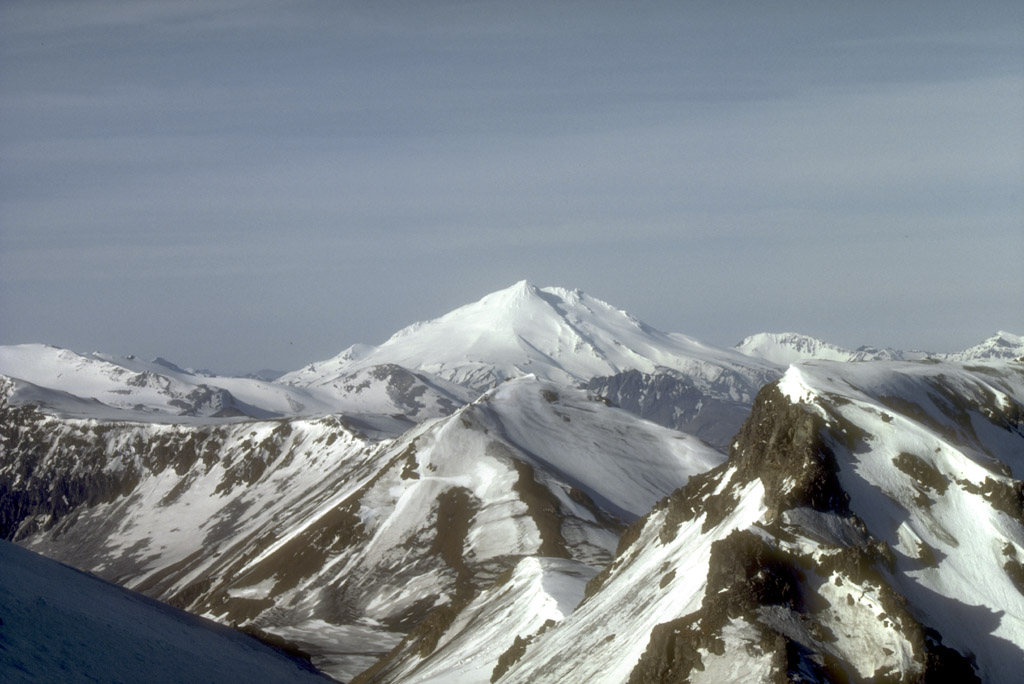
- Mount Dutton lies 14 km (9 mi) north of the community of King Cove on the Alaska Peninsula

Highest point
- Elevation: 4,941 ft (1,506 m)
- Listing: Mountain peaks of Alaska
- Coordinates: 55°10′05″N 162°16′19″W

Geography
- Location within Alaska
- Interactive map of Mount Dutton
- Location: Alaska Peninsula, Alaska, U.S.
- Parent range: Aleutian Range

Geology
- Formed by: Subduction zone volcanism
- Mountain type: Stratovolcano
- Volcanic arc: Aleutian Arc
- Last eruption: Unknown

Mount Dutton is a stratovolcano in the Aleutian Range of the U.S. state of Alaska, on the Alaska Peninsula. It is also the crash site of a World Airways DC-8.

== Geography ==
Dutton lies just short of 9 miles (14 km) from King Cove, a fishing headquarters for the locality.

== Geologic activity ==
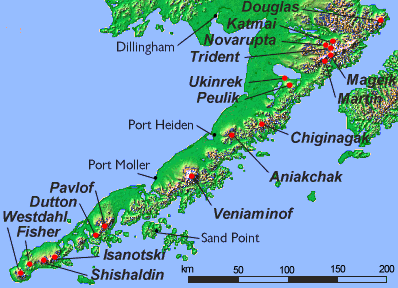
Map showing volcanoes of Alaska Peninsula.

Dutton is a highly glaciated volcano. Its summit is composed of a series of lava domes which form a complex stratovolcano. The mountain's recent history is marked by at least avalanche which removed andesitic lava flows and several lava domes from the flank of its body and swiftly cascaded westward and southward towards Belkofski Bay.

Between 1984 and 1985, a series of earthquake swarms took place in the volcano's vicinity. Another swarm took place in the summer of 1988.

== See also ==
- List of volcanoes in the United States

== Sources ==
- Volcanoes of the Alaska Peninsula and Aleutian Islands-Selected Photographs
- Alaska Volcano Observatory
