= MK Airlines Flight 1602 =

2004 aviation accident in Canada

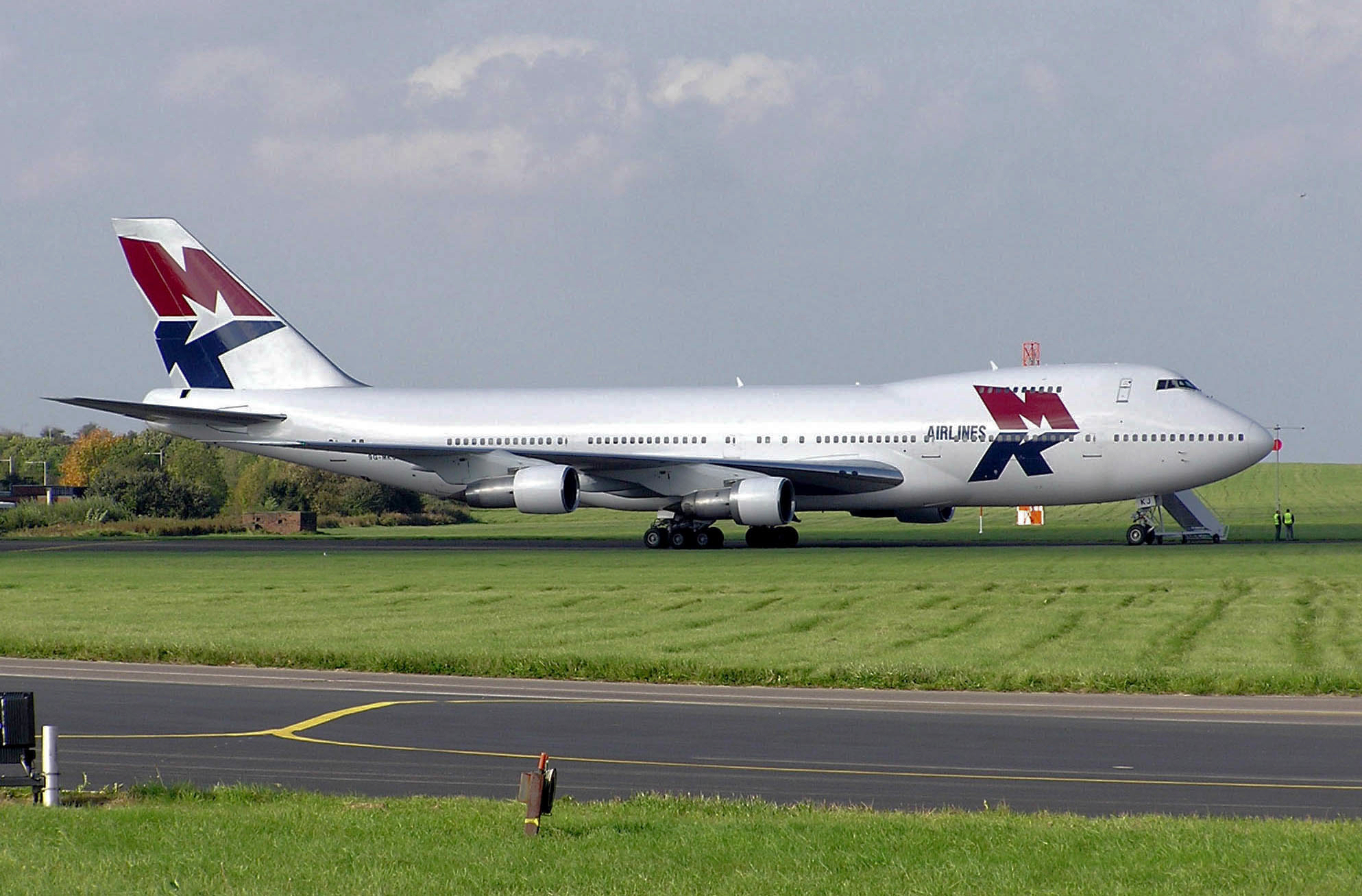
- 9G-MKJ, the aircraft involved, seen four days before the accident

Accident
- Date: 14 October 2004
- Summary: Runway excursion due to incorrect takeoff speed caused by pilot error
- Site: Halifax Stanfield International Airport, Nova Scotia, Canada; 44°51′44.7″N 63°31′49.83″W

Aircraft
- Aircraft type: Boeing 747-244B/SF
- Operator: MK Airlines
- IATA flight No.: 7G1602
- ICAO flight No.: MKA1602
- Call sign: KRUGER AIR 1602
- Registration: 9G-MKJ
- Flight origin: Bradley International Airport, Windsor Locks, Connecticut, United States
- Stopover: Halifax Stanfield International Airport, Enfield, Nova Scotia, Canada
- Destination: Zaragoza Airport, Zaragoza, Spain
- Occupants: 7
- Crew: 7
- Fatalities: 7
- Survivors: 0

MK Airlines Flight 1602 was an MK Airlines Boeing 747-200 cargo aircraft en route from Halifax Stanfield International Airport, Nova Scotia, Canada, to Zaragoza Airport, Spain. On 14 October 2004, it crashed on take-off from Halifax, killing the crew of 7. It was the fourth accident for MK Airlines.

== Background ==
=== Aircraft ===
The aircraft involved was a Boeing 747-244B/SF, registered as 9G-MKJ, manufactured in 1980. It had logged 80,619 airframe hours and 16,368 takeoff and landing cycles and was equipped with four Pratt & Whitney JT9D-7Q engines.

=== Crew ===
In command was Captain Michael Thornycroft, who had been with MK Airlines since its establishment in 1990. He had 23,200 flight hours including 4,000 hours on the Boeing 747. The first officer was Gary Keogh, who had 8,537 flight hours. The flight engineer was Peter Launder, who had 2,000 flight hours. There was also a relief captain (David Lamb), and flight engineer (Steven Hooper), who had 1,600 and 1,990 flight hours respectively. The ground engineer was Mario Zahn, and the loadmaster was Chris Strydom. Five of the seven crew members were from Zimbabwe; the remaining two (Thornycroft and Zahn) were from South Africa.

== Accident ==
At 00:03 local time, on 14 October 2004, MK Airlines Flight 1602 took off from Windsor Locks-Bradley International Airport, Connecticut. The aircraft was loaded with a cargo of lawn tractors and made an intermediate stop at Halifax at 02:12 to be loaded up with approximately 53,000 kilograms (53 t; 117,000 lb) of lobster and fish.

Flight 1602 taxied to Runway 24 (now Runway 23), and the takeoff roll was commenced at 06:53:22. When the aircraft reached 130 knots (240 km/h; 150 mph), the control column was moved aft to 8.4° to initiate rotation as the aircraft passed the 5,500-foot (1,700 m) mark of Runway 24; with 3,300 feet (1,000 m) left on the runway, the aircraft began to rotate. The pitch attitude stabilized briefly at approximately 9° nose-up, with an airspeed of 144 knots (267 km/h; 166 mph). Because the 747 still had not lifted off the runway, the control column was moved further aft to 10°, and the aircraft responded with a further pitch up to approximately 11°; at this time, a tailstrike occurred. The aircraft was approximately at the 8,000-foot (2,400 m) mark and slightly left of the center-line. The control column was then relaxed slightly, to 9° aft. The pitch attitude stabilized in the 11° range for the next four seconds, and the tailstrike abated as a result. With approximately 600 feet (180 m) of runway remaining, the thrust levers were advanced to 92% and the engine pressure ratios (EPRs) increased to 1.60. With 420 feet (130 m) remaining, a second tailstrike took place. As the aircraft passed the end of the runway, the control column was 13.5° aft, pitch attitude was 11.9° nose-up, and airspeed was 152 knots (282 km/h; 175 mph). The highest recorded nose-up pitch of 14.5° was recorded at one minute and two seconds after takeoff initiation after the aircraft passed the end of the runway at a speed of 155 knots (287 km/h; 178 mph). The aircraft became airborne approximately 670 feet (200 m) beyond the paved surface and flew a distance of 325 feet (99 m). The lower aft fuselage then struck an earthen berm supporting an instrument landing system (ILS) localizer antenna 300 metres (980 ft) beyond the end of the runway, separating from the plane. The plane then headed forwards in a straight line for another 1,200 feet (370 m), breaking into pieces and bursting into flames when it struck the ground.

== Emergency response ==
About 60–80 firefighters and 20 pieces of apparatus from Halifax Regional Fire and Emergency responded to the call. It took nearly three hours to extinguish the post-crash fire.

== Investigation ==
An investigation into the crash revealed that the flight crew had used the incorrect speeds and thrust setting during the take-off attempt, with incorrect take-off data being calculated when preparing the flight (incorrect V speed calculation, as the result of the crew re-using a lighter take-off weight of 240,000 kilograms or 530,000 pounds from the aircraft's previous take-off at Bradley, instead of the correct weight of 353,000 kilograms or 778,000 pounds). The official report blamed the company for serious non-conformance to flight and duty time with no regulations or company rules governing maximum duty periods for loadmasters and ground engineers resulting in increased potential for fatigue-induced errors. Additionally, the report pointed to the crew's unfamiliarity with the use of the Boeing Laptop Tool, which calculated the proper power requirement based on the crew inputting the cargo weight, runway length and weather conditions.

MK Airlines disputed the findings citing that the cockpit voice recorder (CVR) was too heavily damaged in the post-crash fire to yield any information.

== See also ==
- Boeing 747 hull losses
- National Airlines Flight 102
