= LAC Colombia =

Colombian airline

Líneas Aéreas del Caribe
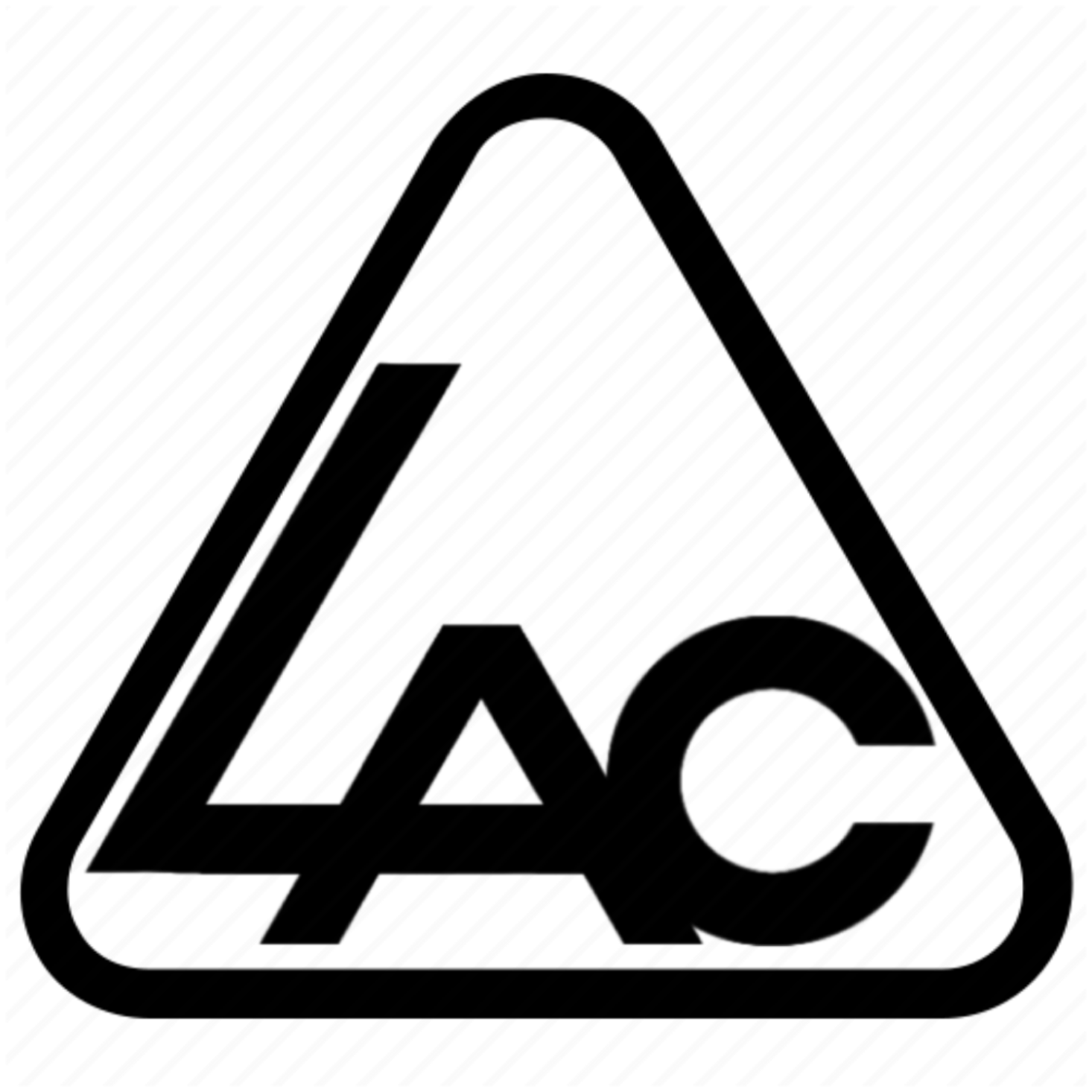

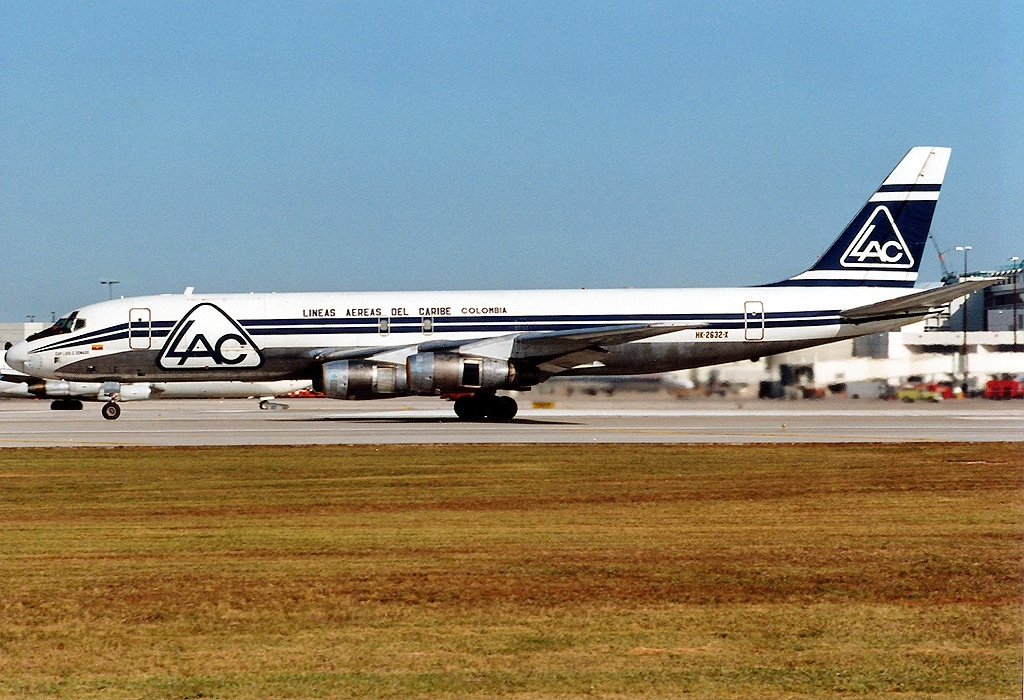
- A LAC Douglas DC-8-54F taxiing at Miami International Airport in 1992
IATA	ICAO	Call sign
LC	LIC	LAC
- Founded: February 28, 1974; 52 years ago
- Ceased operations: June 28, 1996; 30 years ago
- Hubs: Ernesto Cortissoz International Airport
- Secondary hubs: Rafael Nuñez International Airport
- Fleet size: 15
- Headquarters: Barranquilla, Colombia
- Key people: Luís Carlos Donado Velilla (Founder and CEO)

LAC (Líneas Aéreas del Caribe) was a Colombian airline that was founded in Barranquilla in 1974.

== History ==
Driven by the initiative of Captain Luís Carlos Donado Velilla, who wanted to withdraw from Aerocosta and set up a new family owned-airline, LAC was founded on February 28, 1974. LAC started as a limited company and Luis's first partners were his wife, María Fajardo de Donado, and his two brothers Orlando and Raúl Donado Velilla. Captain 'Lucho' Donado already had experience in the creation and development of airlines, as he had co-founded LATCO, Aerocóndor Colombia and Aerocosta. Barranquilla excel at achieving strong positioning and leadership in both of the passengers and air cargo markets.

In 1972 and despite, being Aerocosta at its best, Captain Luis Carlos Donado (one of the majority shareholders) was tired of non-family members and decided to sell this airline to Floramerica. The new managers of this company did not like the C-46 much and that is how Lucho Donado made a proposal to buy them for a price slightly higher than what they had acquired, but with the condition that they let them operate under the banner of Aerocosta until LAC had the approval of the Aerocivil. This was the case and the Donado Velilla brothers flew their two Curtiss planes through the Eastern Plains with the Aerocosta flag, but billing the flights as Donado Velilla Brothers (DOVEL) until February 28, 1974, when they already started operating with the Colombian Aerocivil as Caribbean Airlines.

"If the cargo does not speak and presents so many problems, how will one be passengers?" - Captain Donado Velilla said once wisely.

The company was born with two Curtiss C-46s which were painted purple and the Barranquilleros nicknamed them "The Bishops." These planes covered national routes between the Atlantic Coast, the Eastern Plains and the capital city of Bogotá. In mid-September of the same year 74, the company became closed anonymous and the wives and children of the Donado Velilla brothers were included as partners. Raúl Donado Velilla moved to Bogotá with his family and Carlos Alberto Donado Fajardo (finishing his university studies) is linked to the company in Barranquilla. In August 1974, the company acquired a Douglas DC-6 in Damascus (Syria) and began international operations to Panama, Margarita Island and some Caribbean Islands. In the middle of that year, LAC signed an important agreement with the KLM by means of which Colombian flowers were transported from Bogotá to Curaçao where they made connections to Amsterdam. At that time the leading freight agencies in the market were Colcarga (today UTI) and Florcarga (today DHL Global Forwarding).

== Routes ==
LAC signed an important contract with El Tiempo and El Espectador to transport the press every night from Bogotá to Barranquilla, Cali and Medellín. In August 1977, LAC sold the Curtiss and renewed its fleet by acquiring four DC-6s in auction in Tucson, Arizona of which two were operated (HK-1702 and HK-1703) and the rest were scrapped for spare parts. With these two new Douglas DC-6B, the newly approved route to Miami began operating in October with three new weekly frequencies, weekly flights to Panama are increased to three, and the new route to Caracas is opened. In March 1978 the fifth DC-6B arrives and the company restructures its flying routes:

- Three weekly frequencies on the Bogotá–Barranquilla–Miami route
- Three weekly frequencies to Caracas
- Four weekly frequencies to Panama
- Three weekly frequencies to Curaçao
- A weekly flight to Pointe-à-Pitre
- Six weekly flights Bogotá–Cartagena–Barranquilla–Bogotá
- Six weekly flights Bogotá–Medellín–Bogotá

== Fleet ==
LAC Colombia consisted of the following fleet:

LAC Colombia fleet
Aircraft	Total	Introduced	Retired	Notes
Boeing 707-320C	1	1986	1988	Leased from Southern Air Transport
Curtiss C-46 Commando	1	1975	1976	
Douglas C-47 Skytrain	1	Unknown	Unknown	Leased from an unknown airline and was the only C-47 in their fleet
Douglas DC-6B	6	1975	1988	Operated in Santa Marta, Bogotá, Subachoque, and Sierra Nevada del Cocuy
Douglas DC-8-33F	1	1985	1992	
Douglas DC-8-52F	1	1994	1995	
Douglas DC-8-54F	2	1980	1996	
Douglas DC-8-55F	2	1992	1996	Both were written off

== Accidents and incidents ==
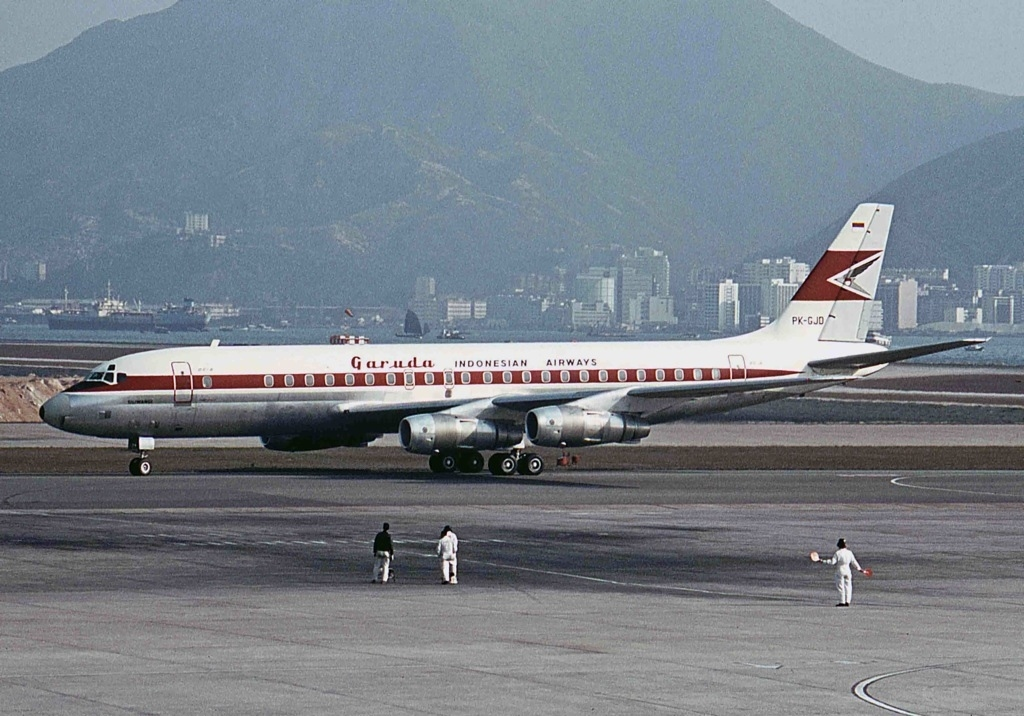
A Douglas DC-8 (registered HK-3753X) in 1967 at Kai Tak Airport, being operated by Garuda Indonesian Airways

- On February 4, 1976, a Douglas DC-6B (registered HK-1389) crashed into the sea following engine trouble while flying from Santa Marta, Colombia to Curaçao. All three crew members on board were killed.
- On April 29, 1978, a Douglas DC-6B (registered HK-1705) crashed shortly after takeoff from El Dorado International Airport. All three crew members and five of the nine passengers were killed. The aircraft reportedly failed to gain sufficient height on takeoff from runway 30, as it struck a tree and broke up.
- On October 15, 1992, a Douglas DC-8-55F (registered HK-3753X) lost its directional control on landing at Olaya Herrera Airport. It veered off the left side of the runway and subsequently, the nose landing gear collapsed. All three crew members on board survived.
- On February 4, 1996, LAC Colombia Flight 028, a Douglas DC-8-55CF (registered HK-3979), flying to São Paulo, Brazil lost lift, speed, and fell on a neighborhood in Asunción, Paraguay due to the negligence and recklessness of its crew, causing the death of the four crew members on board, as well as 18 people on the ground. This accident practically caused the airline's liquidation a few months later. It became the worst air tragedy in Paraguay.

== See also ==
- List of defunct airlines of Colombia
