= Worldways Canada =

Canadian charter airline (1973–1990)

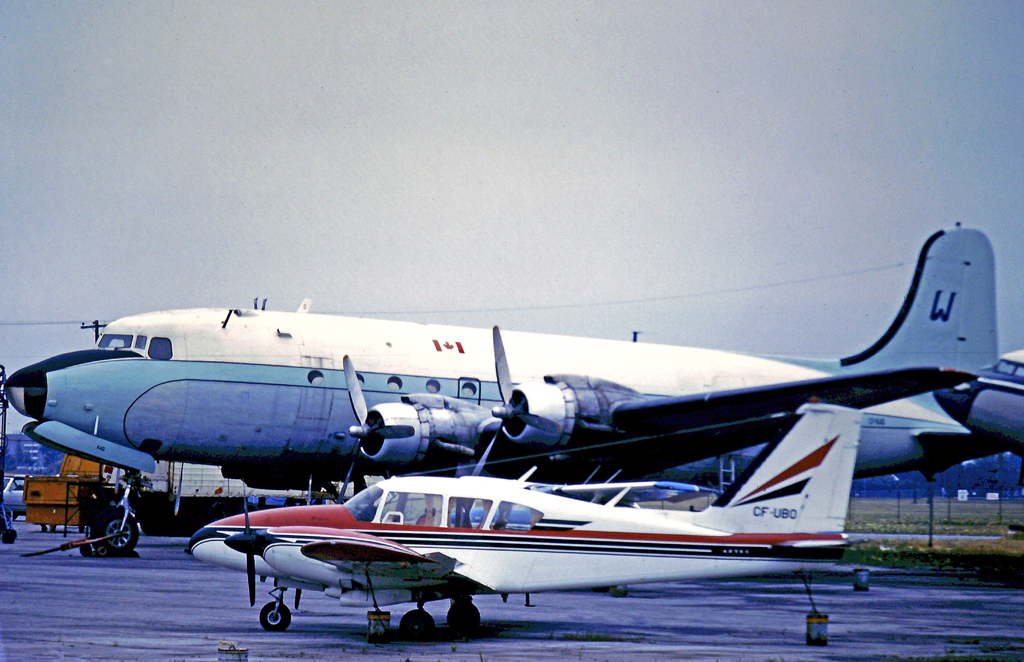
- Douglas DC-4 of Worldways at Toronto Airport (July 1975)
IATA	ICAO	Call sign
WG	WWC	—
- Commenced operations: 1973
- Ceased operations: 11 October 1990
- Key people: Roy Moore

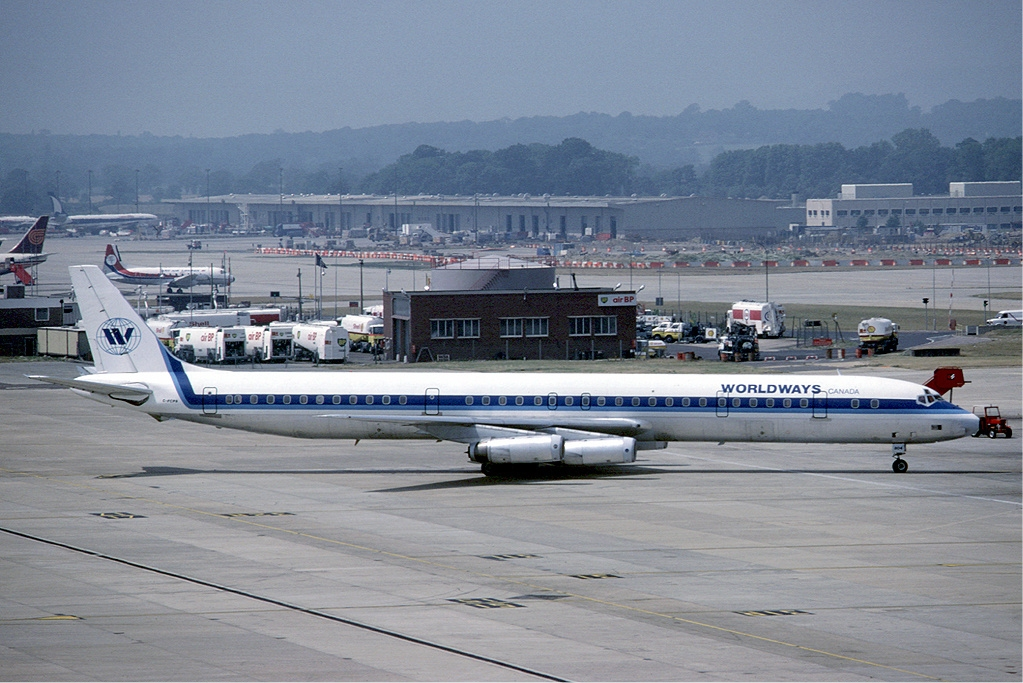
Douglas DC-8-63 at London Gatwick Airport (June 1983)

Worldways Canada was a Canadian charter airline that started in operations in 1973, ceased its operations on 11 October 1990 and went out of business in 1991. The airline was created by Roy T. Moore with the assistance of Dennis Lewis.

== Operations and fleet ==
Worldways Canada's fleet of aircraft started with Lockheed L-188 Electras, later adding Douglas DC-4's. The Electras were replaced with Convair 560s. The company later added Convair 640s, which were put on charter serving Canada's East Coast offshore oil industry.

When international passenger charter company Ontario Worldair folded in 1981, Worldways bought its fleet of three Boeing 707-320 aircraft and entered that segment of the charter market. In 1983, Worldways sold the B707s to the Royal Australian Air Force and bought four Douglas DC-8-63s from CP Air.

In 1985, Worldways added two Lockheed L-1011-385-1s (later upgraded to L-1011-50). These were initially operated by Pacific Southwest Airlines in 1974–75, then sold to AeroPerú. These L-1011s were two of the five built by Lockheed where the front cargo hold was removed and a windowless lower deck lounge was added, complete with seating for 12 additional passengers, stowage space for their carry-on bags, and external air stairs for direct boarding to the lounge from the tarmac. (Note: German airline LTU International operated the remaining three "cargo lounge" L-1011s.) Worldways had winter leases with Eastern Air Lines and British Caledonian, by which Worldways brought in additional L-1011s for the winter charter season. In 1989, Worldways purchased three Boeing 727-100s from TAP Air Portugal.

== See also ==
- List of defunct airlines of Canada
