= Air Transport International Flight 782 =

1995 aviation accident in Missouri

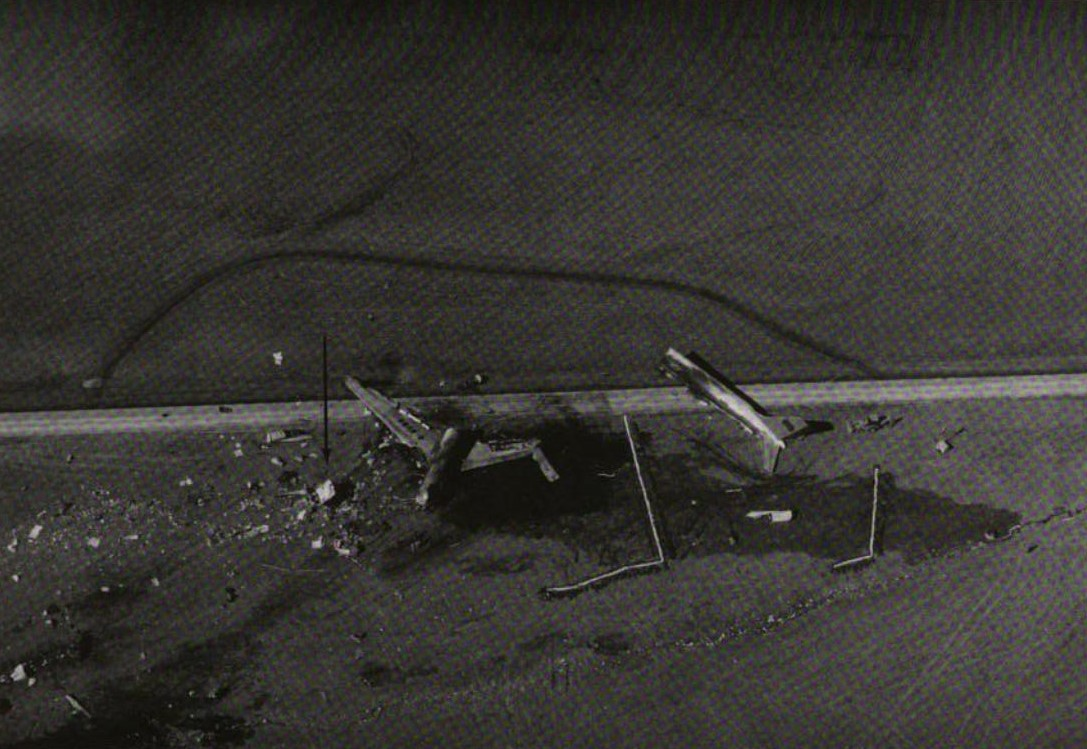
- Aerial view of the aircraft wreckage

Accident
- Date: February 16, 1995
- Summary: Loss of directional control on takeoff due to pilot error; improper training
- Site: Kansas City International Airport, Kansas City, Missouri, United States; 39°18′50.4″N 094°43′51.8″W

Aircraft
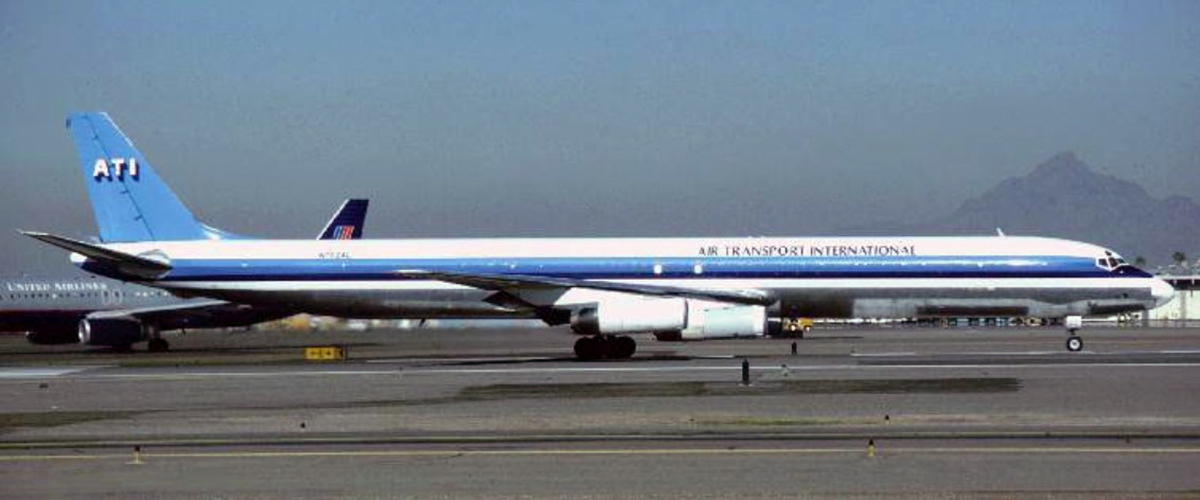
- N782AL, the aircraft involved in the accident
- Aircraft type: McDonnell Douglas DC-8-63F
- Operator: Air Transport International
- Call sign: AIR TRANSPORT 782
- Registration: N782AL
- Flight origin: Kansas City International Airport, Kansas City, Missouri
- Destination: Westover Metropolitan Airport, Springfield, Massachusetts
- Occupants: 3
- Passengers: 0
- Crew: 3
- Fatalities: 3
- Survivors: 0

Air Transport International Flight 782 was a ferry flight from Kansas City International Airport in Missouri to Westover Metropolitan Airport in Springfield, Massachusetts using a Douglas DC-8 with one of its 4 engines inoperative. On February 16, 1995, the aircraft failed to take off from Kansas City, overran the runway, and crashed. All three flight crew members, the only occupants on board, were killed. The cause was deemed to be improper training, which resulted in the crew failing to understand a three-engine takeoff procedure. In addition, the Federal Aviation Administration (FAA)'s oversight of rest regulations and the airline were both poor.

== Aircraft and crew ==
The aircraft involved in the accident was a McDonnell Douglas DC-8-63F (registration N782AL, serial number 45929) and was the 367th DC-8 built. It was manufactured in 1968 and previously had been owned by Canadian Pacific Air Lines, Flying Tiger Line, Worldways Canada, which leased the aircraft to Icelandair and Air Algérie in 1985. In 1990 the aircraft was purchased by Aerolease Financial Group and converted into a freighter. The aircraft was then leased to Burlington Air Express and then in 1994, it was leased to Air Transport International (ATI). The aircraft had made 77,096 flight hours with 22,404 take-off and landing cycles at the time of the accident.

The captain was 48-year-old Walter Miga, Sr., who had been hired by ATI in 1994 and had 9,711 hours of flight experience, of which he had completed 4,483 hours on the DC-8. He had previous experience flying aircraft for Trans Air Link and Fine Air.

The first officer was 38-year-old Mark Ulmer, who was on probation from ATI and was undergoing training for the DC-8, but had not received his type rating for that aircraft at the time of the accident. He had only 171 hours on the DC-8 but had 4,261 flight hours altogether.

The flight engineer was 48-year-old Kerry Hardy, a former United States Air Force C-141B flight engineer who had 4,460 hours of flight experience, though only 218 of them on the DC-8. He was also on probation at the time of the accident.

== Accident ==
On the day of the accident, N782AL landed at Kansas City Airport after a scheduled cargo flight from Denver, Colorado. The aircraft was loaded with new cargo and prepared for a flight to Toledo, Ohio. The flight was intended to be operated by another crew, but they were unable to start the No. 1 (outer left) engine. Maintenance workers examined the engine and found that its gear ratio had failed. The repair could not be performed on-site, so ATI decided that the aircraft would perform a ferry flight to Westover Metropolitan Airport (CEF) in Chicopee, Massachusetts for repairs. Another ATI DC-8-63F with registration N788AL, flown by the accident crew, arrived from Germany via Dover, Delaware. The cargo and N782AL's original crew were transferred to N788AL and the accident crew were assigned to the ferry flight.

During engine startup, N782AL experienced engine problems for a second time. The No. 4 (outer right) engine initially failed to start as its ignition circuit breaker was accidentally left open. The breaker was closed and the crew began to start the No. 4 engine again, though this time, a ground crew worker told the flight crew that the engine was emitting smoke and the crew shut down the engine. The crew then followed the starter duty cycle and started the No. 2 engine. The crew then started the No. 4 engine a third time, this time without incident.

At 20:20 local time, Flight 782 began its first take-off roll from runway 01L. According to the cockpit voice recorder (CVR), the takeoff appeared normal. At 20:20:23, first officer Ulmer called out "hundred knots," only for captain Miga to say one second later, "ah [expletive]. Abort." The take-off was aborted, and the aircraft exited the runway. The tower controller instructed the flight to switch back to the ground control frequency and asked the crew if they needed assistance, to which they declined. Miga told the crew he had trouble with maintaining the aircraft's directional control during takeoff, saying, "it [the power on the No. 4 engine] just came up too fast is what it did." At 20:21 the flight crew decided to attempt a second takeoff.

At 20:27, Flight 782 began its second takeoff attempt. After traveling 3,220 feet (980 m) down the runway, the aircraft began to roll towards the left. At 3,810 feet (1,160 m), the aircraft prematurely rotated and a tailstrike occurred, with the tail scraping the runway for 820 feet (250 m). Having used up 5,200 feet (1,600 m) of the runway, the DC-8 finally became airborne, only to climb to 98 feet (30 m). The aircraft then banked left, entered a stall and crashed into the ground. The aircraft skidded and broke apart, with the wreckage stopping after 7,500 feet (2,300 m). The three flight crew members were killed.

== Investigation ==
The National Transportation Safety Board (NTSB) launched an investigation into the crash of Flight 782. The NTSB noted several events during captain Miga's training at American International Airways and ATI. One training captain wrote in a logbook that Miga "would make a good captain." However, another stated that Miga did "not exhibit the confidence and command authority necessary to function as a pilot in command. I do not recommend he be considered for an upgrade at this time."

Another check captain noted that Miga had good control of aircraft and cross-checking the instruments, but also recommended that Miga should only conduct domestic flights. Despite the recommendation, Miga continued to fly international flights, with an observer providing positive remarks during a flight to Germany on February 14, 1995, two days before the crash. Even though his simulator training on three-engine ferry flights was marked "satisfactory" and he had flown two previous three-engine ferry flights as a first officer, Flight 782 was Miga's first three-engine ferry flight as captain.

First officer Ulmer had failed three flight checks in 1989, 1992, and 1993, and received three notices of disapproval from the Federal Aviation Administration (FAA). On all three occasions, Ulmer underwent retraining and passed on the second time.

Flight engineer Hardy had entered an incorrect minimum control speed of 107 knots (123 mph; 198 km/h) instead of the required 116 knots (133 mph; 215 km/h) using the Fahrenheit scale instead of Celsius. Further, the captain and first officer did not verify the speeds as required.

The NTSB determined that the accident was caused by the flight crew violating standard operating procedures by inappropriately deciding to continue takeoff when the aircraft was below the calculated rotation airspeed. ATI had provided improper training, which resulted in them failing to understand a three-engine takeoff procedure. The airline had also provided inadequate rest, resulting in the flight crew being fatigued at the time of the accident, though the NTSB could not conclude if it had degraded their performance. In addition, the FAA's oversight of rest regulations and the airline were both poor.

== In popular culture ==
The crash of Air Transport International Flight 782 was featured in the 2024 episode "Deadly Departure", of the Canadian-made, internationally distributed documentary series Mayday.

== See also ==
- Airborne Express Flight 827, another DC-8 that crashed during a non-scheduled flight one year later
- MK Airlines Flight 1602, another accident involving incorrect speed calculations and premature aircraft rotation
- Emirates Flight 407, another accident involving incorrect speed calculations, based on an incorrect aircraft weight
