= MK Airlines =

Cargo airline from Ghana

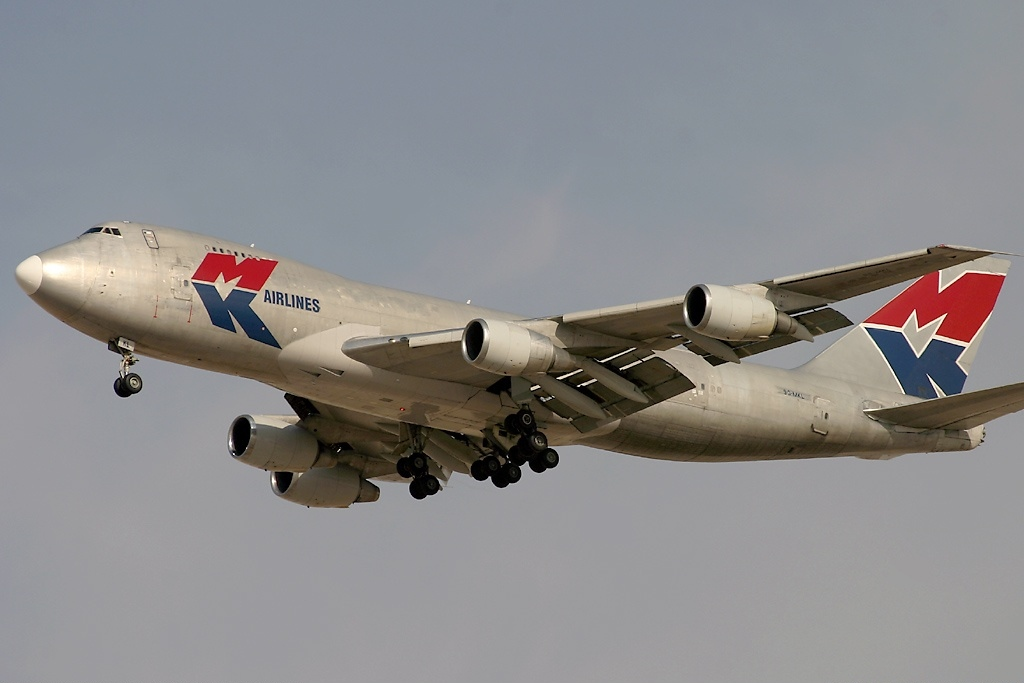
- Boeing 747-200
IATA	ICAO	Call sign
7G	MKA; BGB	KRUGER AIR; BRITISH GLOBAL
- Founded: 1990; 36 years ago
- Commenced operations: 1991; 35 years ago
- Ceased operations: 2010; 16 years ago
- Hubs: Accra; Johannesburg–O. R. Tambo; London–Gatwick; Luxembourg; Manston; Ostend/Bruges
- Alliance: Cargo d’Or (Ghana), Flash Airlines (Nigeria)
- Headquarters: Ghana (1990–1995 and 1996–2006); Nigeria (1995–1996); United Kingdom (2006–2010)
- Key people: Michael Kruger (founder and CEO)
- Website: mkairlines.com

MK Air Cargo, trading as MK Airlines, was a cargo airline based in Ghana from its inception until 1996, when it relocated in Nigeria. It was duly registered in the United Kingdom in 1990, and its headquarters were in Hartfield, East Sussex, mastering freight services to and from Africa.

== History ==
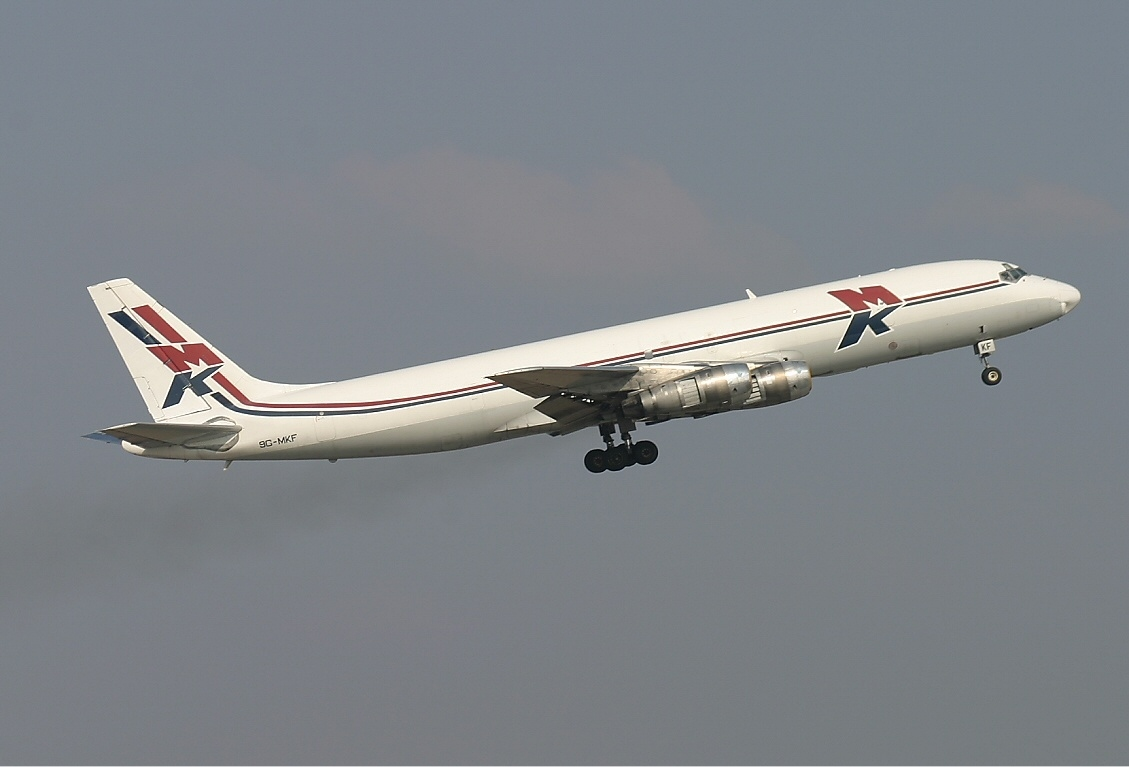
MK Airlines Douglas DC-8, 2004

MK Air Cargo was founded by Michael C. Kruger on 14 March 1990 (MK stands for its founder's initials). It was a British concern but was headquartered in Ghana from the very first beginning. Flight operations started in early 1991 and these also incorporated those of (UPS handling agent) Cargo d'Or of Ghana itself and Flash Airlines of Nigeria. A network of cargo flights with hubs at Accra International Airport and Gatwick Airport was set up, which was served with only one aircraft, a Douglas DC-8 freighter. The airline routed most of its transported freight via its European bases at Gatwick Airport, Kent International Airport, Ostend–Bruges International Airport or Luxembourg-Findel International Airport. The African hub was located at OR Tambo International Airport, close to Johannesburg.

In 1993, the same year Cargo d'Or left the partnership, MK Airlines brand was adopted. From 1996, the headquarters of the airline were relocated in Nigeria and at the same time Flash Airlines operations were fully absorbed. From 1999 onwards, MK Airlines expanded its fleet with full-cargo Boeing 747-200 jetliners. The last of its DC-8s was put out of service in 2006.

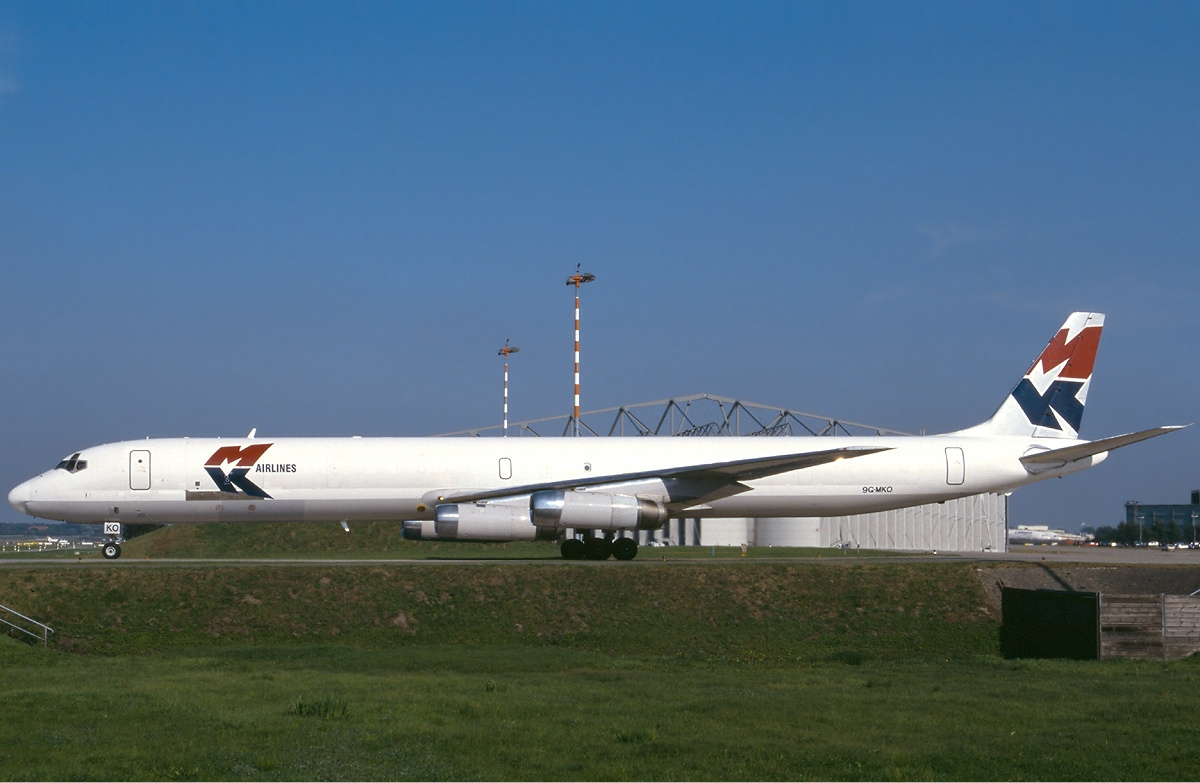
Douglas DC-8-63F

In September 2006, MK Airlines was issued a new airline licence by the United Kingdom Civil Aviation Authority. In November of the following year, plans for a rebranding as British Global were announced. The company had its ICAO identification code changed to BGB accordingly, but in March 2008, the rebranding was postponed indefinitely.

Due to financial problems, MK Airlines had to suspend all flight operations on 10 June 2008, and went into administration. After an investment had been received from Trans Atlantic Aviation, a subsidiary of the Belfairs Group, limited operations could resume on 20 June. Following a reorganization of the airline's funding, bankruptcy administration could be left on 24 June 2009 but plans for the acquisition of more fuel-efficient aircraft of the Boeing 747-400 type could not be realized.

The financial burdens of the company could not be alleviated in the short term. On 9 April 2010, all operations ceased with the surrender of the Air Operators Certificate to the UK CAA on the same day. An attempt was made to secure a company voluntary arrangement (CVA) in order to be in a position to apply for a relaunch of operations. The CVA was successfully challenged by creditors as having been irregularly conducted and was rejected by the High Court of Justice on 5 October 2010.

== Accidents and incidents ==
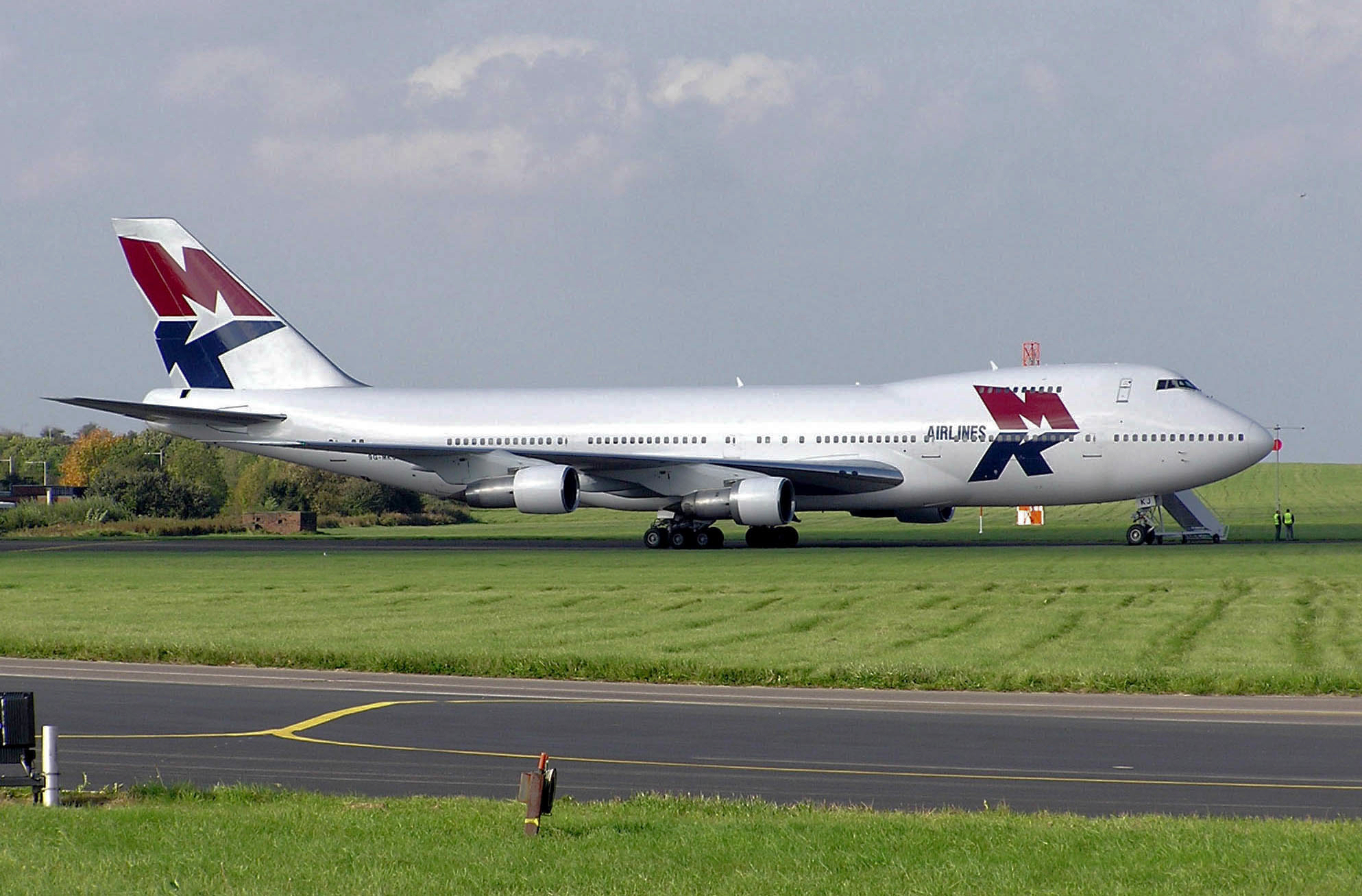
The Boeing 747-200 which was destroyed in the crash of Flight 1602, seen at Filton Airfield four days before the fatal accident

- 17 December 1996 – A Douglas DC-8F struck trees upon approaching Port Harcourt International Airport in Nigeria. The pilots did not manage to perform a go-around, and the aircraft touched down without being fully controlled, causing it to veer off the runway, thus being destroyed beyond economical repair. The four crew members were uninjured.
- 27 November 2001 – A Boeing 747-200 crashed when descending to Port Harcourt (Nigeria) after a cargo flight in bad weather. Nigeria's Ministry of Aviation produced a Civil Aviation Accident Report (FMA/AIPB/389) which found the pilot was using a nonstandard final approach on autopilot below 2,000 feet (610 m). Of the 13 persons on board, one died in the ensuing fire.
- 14 October 2004 – The crash of Flight 1602 with its seven fatalities marked the worst accident in the history of the airline. The Boeing 747 did not get airborne upon take-off from Halifax Stanfield International Airport after a fuel stop. The runway was overshot, and the airliner broke up and burst into flames. There were no survivors. The TSB investigation into the accident revealed that the crew had used a wrong aircraft weight for calculating the necessary take-off thrust.

== See also ==
- List of defunct airlines of the United Kingdom
