= World Airways Flight 802 =

1973 aviation accident in Alaska

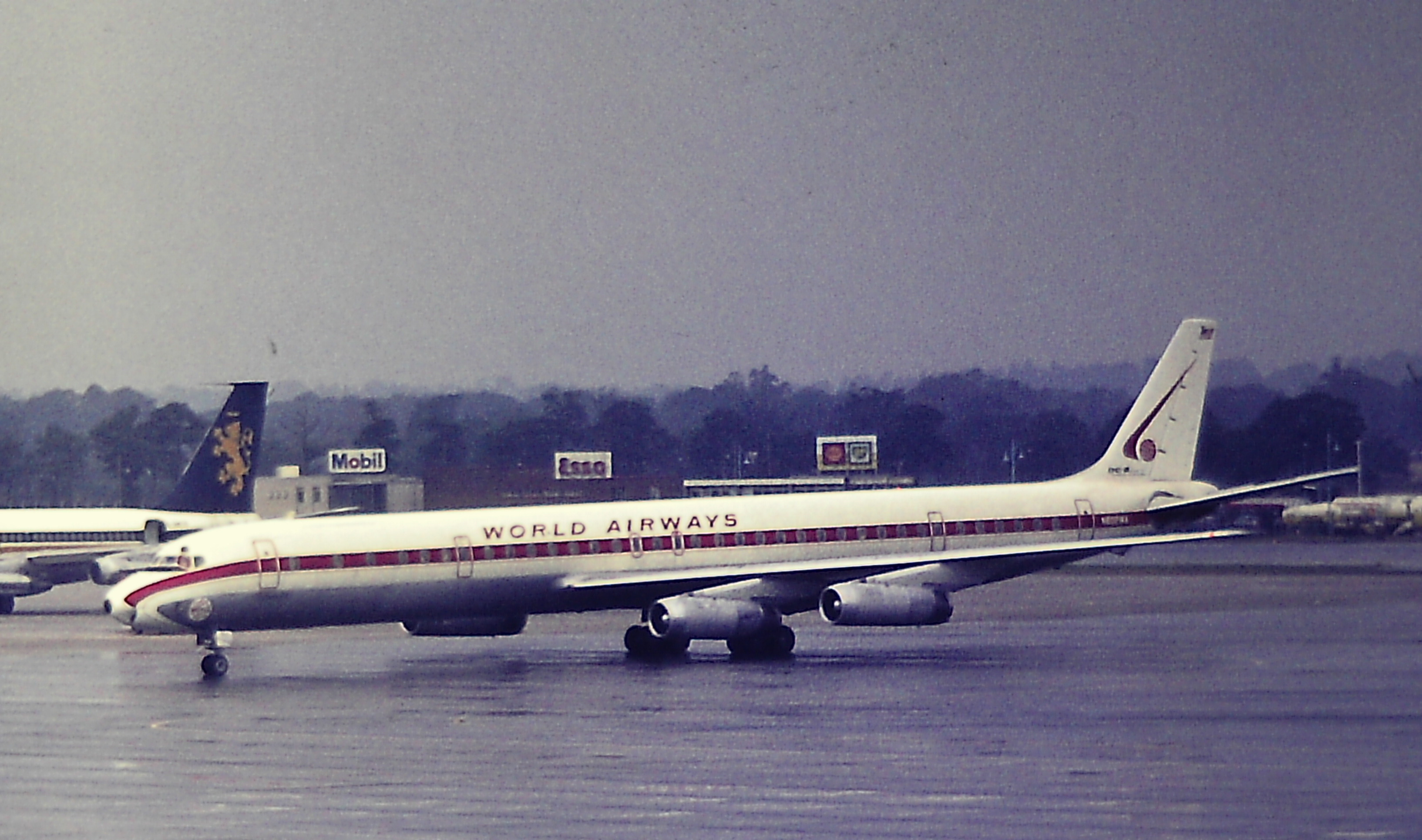
- N802WA, the aircraft involved in the accident, seen in 1972

Accident
- Date: 8 September 1973
- Summary: Controlled flight into terrain
- Site: Mount Dutton, King Cove, Alaska; 55.1893°N 162.2645°W

Aircraft
- Aircraft type: Douglas DC-8-63CF
- Operator: World Airways
- Call sign: WORLD 802
- Registration: N802WA
- Flight origin: Travis AFB, California
- 1st stopover: Cold Bay Airport, Alaska
- Last stopover: Yokota AFB, Japan
- Destination: Clark AFB, Philippines
- Occupants: 6
- Passengers: 3
- Crew: 3
- Fatalities: 6
- Survivors: 0

On September 8, 1973, a Douglas DC-8 operated by World Airways as World Airways Flight 802 crashed on high ground while on approach to Cold Bay Airport, Alaska, killing all six people on board.

The official accident investigation concluded that the probable cause was the captain's non-adherence to published instrument approach procedures for the destination airport.

== History of the flight ==
Flight 802 was a contract cargo flight for the US Military Airlift Command from Travis AFB, California, to Clark AFB, Philippines; Cold Bay was the first planned stopover. The flight crew consisted of Captain John A. Weininger (52), First Officer Gregg W. Evans (27), and Flight Engineer Robert W. Brocklesby (46), while on board were also three non-revenue passengers, including two company employees.

The aircraft operating flight 802 was a four-engine Douglas DC-8-63CF jetliner, registration N802WA, which had entered service two years earlier, in 1971. Maintenance records for the aircraft did not highlight any significant problem.

== Final descent and crash ==
After an uneventful flight from Travis, the aircraft descended in cloud towards Cold Bay Airport, straying significantly off-course and into an area of poor radio navigation reception, until at 05:42 AKDT it struck Mount Dutton at an altitude of 3,500 ft (1,100 m).
