= Airborne Express Flight 827 =

1996 aviation accident in Virginia

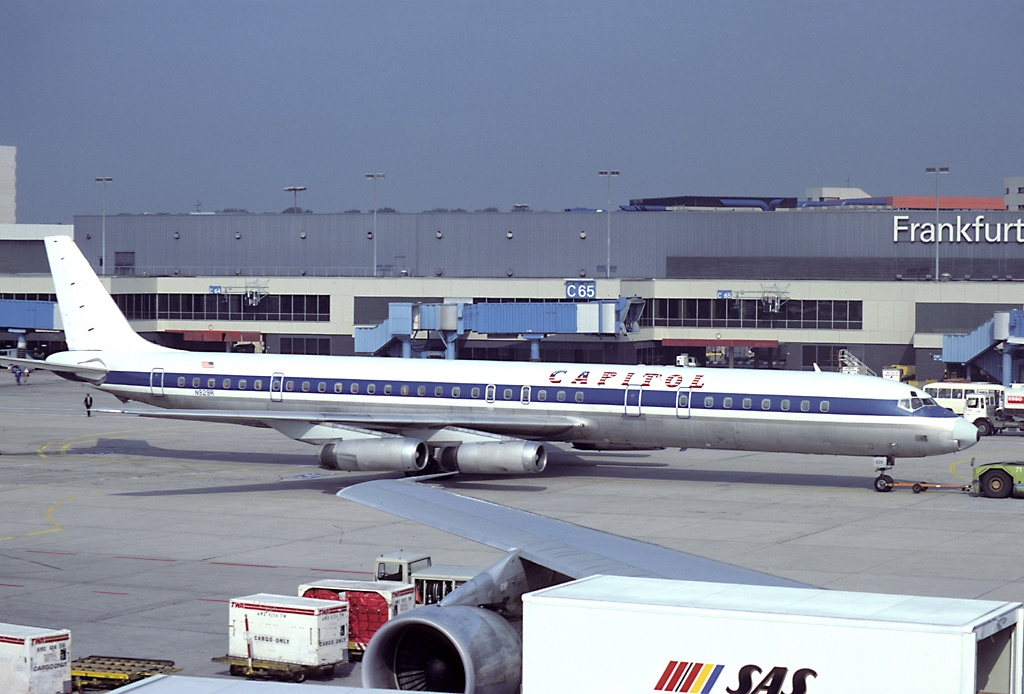
- The aircraft involved in the accident, while still in service with Capitol Air in 1984

Accident
- Date: December 22, 1996
- Summary: Failed stall recovery test; pilot error; ABX's failures in flight programming and pilot training
- Site: East River Mountain, Narrows, Virginia, United States; 37°19.30′N 80°53.06′W

Aircraft
- Aircraft type: Douglas DC-8-63F
- Operator: ABX Air operating under Airborne Express
- IATA flight No.: GB827
- ICAO flight No.: ABX827
- Call sign: ABEX 827
- Registration: N827AX
- Flight origin: Piedmont Triad International Airport, Greensboro, North Carolina
- Destination: Piedmont Triad International Airport, Greensboro, North Carolina (Return flight)
- Occupants: 6
- Passengers: 3
- Crew: 3
- Fatalities: 6
- Survivors: 0

Airborne Express Flight 827 was a functional evaluation flight (FEF) of an ABX Air (operating under Airborne Express) Douglas DC-8 that had undergone a major modification. On December 22, 1996, during the test flight, the aircraft stalled and crashed, killing all six people on board. Accident investigators determined the causes of the accident was improper crew control inputs and ABX's failures to establish a formal functional evaluation program, relying instead on inadequate flight program guidelines, inadequate requirements, and inadequate and misleading pilot training.

== Background ==
=== Aircraft ===
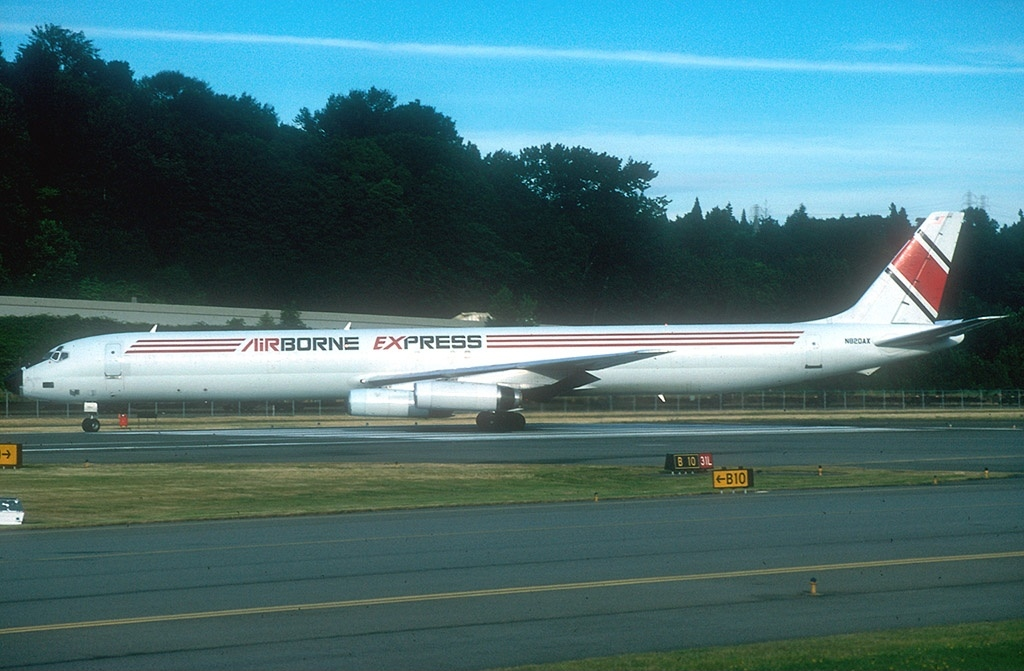
An Airborne Express Douglas DC-8-63F, similar to the one involved in the accident

The aircraft involved was a Douglas DC-8-63 freighter registered as N827AX. The aircraft had been built in 1967 and was previously owned by KLM as a passenger aircraft (with registration PH-DEB) and then Capitol Air and National Airlines (registration N929R). In January 1986 the aircraft was converted into a freighter and delivered to Emery Worldwide (with the same registration). ABX Air (a subsidiary of Airborne Express at the time) purchased the aircraft on June 17, 1996, more than six months before the accident. The aircraft was re-registered as N827AX. It underwent a major overhaul and was delivered to ABX Air on December 15 the same year, just a week before the accident. The aircraft was powered by four Pratt & Whitney JT3D-7 turbofan engines. At the time of the accident, the aircraft had flown 62,800 hours and nine minutes with 24,234 take off and landing cycles.

==== Overhaul ====
The aircraft's overhaul was performed by the Triad International Maintenance Corporation (TIMCO) at Piedmont Triad International Airport in Greensboro, North Carolina. During the major overhaul, the aircraft received major avionic upgrades, including the installation of an electronic flight instrument system (EFIS). All four engines were removed. Two of them were overhauled and reinstalled on the aircraft, while the other two were completely replaced by different JT3D-7 engines from ABX Air. Hush kits were installed on all of the engines for noise reduction. The aircraft's stall warning system was tested and declared functional.

=== Crew ===
Rather than a captain, a first officer and a flight engineer, Flight 827 was crewed by two captains (one flying, one monitoring), and a flight engineer. There were also three aircraft technicians on board.

The captain who was the pilot monitoring (though acting as pilot in command (PIC)) was 48-year-old Garth Avery, who had worked for Airborne Express since 1988 and had 8,087 flight hours, including 869 hours on the DC-8. He was seated in the right seat. Avery was also the airline's Boeing 767 flight manager as well as a flight instructor.

The captain who was the pilot flying (though acting as a co-pilot) was 37-year-old William "Keith" Leming, who had worked for Airborne Express since 1991 and had logged 8,426 flight hours, with 1,509 of them on the DC-8. He was seated in the left seat. Leming was the manager of Airborne Express' DC-8 flight standards (the position previously having been held by Captain Avery) and had previously been a pilot for Trans World Airlines.

The flight engineer was 52-year-old Terry Waelti who, like Captain Avery, had been with Airborne Express since 1988. Waelti had 7,928 flight hours, including 2,576 hours on the DC-8. He was also a DC-8 examiner designated by the Federal Aviation Administration (FAA). Waelti had previously served in the United States Air Force (USAF) and was one of the USAF's first flight engineers to be qualified on the Boeing E-4B.

The three technicians were 48-year-old Edward Bruce Goettsch, 39-year-old Kenneth Athey, and 36-year-old Brian C. Scully. Goettsch and Athey both worked for Airborne Express, while Scully worked for TIMCO.

== Accident ==
Initially, Flight 827 had been scheduled to depart from Piedmont Triad International Airport on December 16, but was delayed due to maintenance. An attempt on December 21, (operated by the same crew) was cut short due to a hydraulic problem. Flight 827 finally departed at 17:40 Eastern Standard Time (EST) at nighttime on December 22, 1996, after being delayed due to additional maintenance. The flight climbed to 9,000 feet (2,700 m) and then to 14,000 feet (4,300 m).

Flight 827 was operating under instrument flight rules (IFR). After departing Greensboro, the aircraft was to fly northwest over New River Valley Airport's VOR, in Pulaski County, Virginia, then to Beckley, West Virginia, followed by other way points in Kentucky and Virginia, and then return to Greensboro. The flight was expected to last two hours.

Shortly after reaching 14,000 feet (4,300 m), the aircraft experienced atmospheric icing, which was indicated when the cockpit voice recorder (CVR) recorded captain Lemming saying, "we're gettin' a little bit of ice here," and "probably get out of this," at 17:48:34 and 17:48:37 respectively.

Several landing gear, hydraulic, and engine tests were performed without incident. At 18:05, flight engineer Waelti said, "next thing is our stall series." The next item was a clean stall maneuver test. The crew would slow the aircraft down until the stick shaker activated, record the stall speed and that of the stick shaker activation, and then recover control of the aircraft. In other words, the flight crew would deliberately stall the aircraft. Captain Avery stated that the crew would stop trimming the aircraft at 184 knots (212 mph; 341 km/h) and that the stall speed (V_{S}) was 122 knots (140 mph; 226 km/h). Flight engineer Waelti stated that the stick shaker would activate at 128 knots (147 mph; 237 km/h), which was 6 knots (6.9 mph; 11 km/h) higher than the calculated stall speed. The flight crew began gradually slowing the aircraft down by 1 knot (1.2 mph; 1.9 km/h) per second.

At 18:07, engine power was increased. One minute later at 18:08, a buffeting sensation was experienced at 149 knots (171 mph; 276 km/h). The following was recorded on the CVR:

18:07:55	Commentary	Sound similar to engine increasing in RPM.
18:08:06	Captain Lemming	Some buffet. (Note: At the time of this comment, the aircraft's speed was 240 knots (280 mph; 440 km/h).)
18:08:07	Captain Avery	Yeah. That's pretty early. *. (Note: The NTSB uses an asterisk to indicate unintelligible words in CVR transcripts.)
18:08:09	Commentary	Sound of rattling.
18:08:11	Flight Engineer Waelti	That's a stall right there… * ain't no [stick] shaker.

At this time, according to the flight data recorder (FDR), the aircraft was at 145 knots (167 mph; 269 km/h). However, the stick shaker had failed to activate. The speed then decreased to 126 knots (145 mph; 233 km/h) and the aircraft entered a real stall. At 18:08:13, captain Lemming decided to terminate the test, called "set max power," and applied full engine power in an attempt to recover from the stall. Although all four engines started to accelerate, engine no. 2 accelerated more slowly. This engine subsequently experienced a compressor stall. Ground witnesses also noted that the aircraft was making "skipping or missing" sounds. At 18:09, Air Traffic Control (ATC) asked the flight if they had initiated an emergency descent, with captain Avery replying, "yes sir." This was the last communication (and only distress call) from Flight 827.

At 18:09:35, the ground proximity warning system (GPWS) activated and sounded "terrain terrain, whoop whoop pull up." Three seconds later at 18:09:38, the aircraft crashed into a mountain travelling over 240 knots (280 mph; 440 km/h) in a nose-down wings-down position of 26 and 52 degrees, respectively. The crash site elevation was 3,400 feet (1,000 m) mean sea level (MSL). The aircraft exploded on impact. All six people on board were killed and the aircraft was destroyed.

== Investigation ==
The National Transportation Safety Board (NTSB) launched an investigation into the accident and arrived at the crash site the same day. Both flight recorders were recovered the next morning. Rescue teams also recovered all six bodies. Efforts to reach the accident site were initially hampered due to its remote location.

The aircraft's flight controls were destroyed in the crash, but the NTSB recovered two trim jackscrews from the horizontal stabilizer.

The NTSB recreated the stall in a simulator. In the simulation, the stick shaker activated at 144 knots (166 mph; 267 km/h). Despite deepening the stall, no unexpected nose-down pitches or lateral rolls occurred in the simulator. The decreasing airspeed caused the nose to pitch up.

In 1991, another Airborne Express DC-8 had entered a real stall during an FEF, but the flight crew was able to recover and test continued with no further incidents. In the 1991 incident, the stick-shaker activated the same time the buffeting sensation occurred. The Federal Aviation Administration (FAA) issued a revised stall recovery procedure to Airborne Express, which they agreed to incorporate. However, the airline had only partially incorporated the procedure at the time of the Flight 827 accident.

Airborne Express' flight operation manual contained only a short section labeled "Test Flights" and the requirements for FEF's read:

...night test flights may be conducted only when the reported ceiling is 800 feet or above and the reported visibility is 2 miles or greater, and the weather forecast indicates that the ceiling and visibility will remain at or above those limits for the duration of the flight. Night test flights flown by flight supervisory personnel may be operated with lower minimums when circumstances warrant.

— Airborne Express, Flight Operations Manual

At the time of the accident, there were scattered showers of light rain and the cloud ceiling was between 14,000 feet (4,300 m) and 15,000 feet (4,600 m). The reported surface weather at Mercer County Airport in Bluefield stated that visibility was two miles.

Because of the aircraft experiencing icing, it experienced a buffet 12 knots (14 mph; 22 km/h) before the stall speed. The FDR indicated that the aircraft had entered a real stall at 126 knots (145 mph; 233 km/h), four knots before the stall speed. The NTSB concluding that the icing, regardless of amount, (along with flight control rigging) did not contribute to the accident.

Despite Captain Lemming's timely decision to terminate the stall test, he subsequently pulled back on the control column from five to ten degrees, allowing the aircraft to enter a real stall. The NTSB notes that he likely did this in an attempt to establish an appropriate pitch attitude and power setting.

Captain Avery did not notice the incorrect flight control inputs made by Captain Lemming, though he did attempt to instruct Lemming on how to recover the airplane from the roll, but not how to recover from the stall. In addition he did not enhance his instructions or take over control of the aircraft himself. The NTSB noted that since both pilots were captains, had manager positions at the airline, and had similar backgrounds, they would have difficulty challenging each other because of a lack of command authority. Captain Avery, as PIC, should have monitored and challenged captain Lemming's actions, but both his PIC and instructional roles were informal on the accident flight.

According to both flight recorders and the recovered horizontal stabilizer trim jackscrew, Captain Lemming had trimmed the aircraft's horizontal stabilizer at 175 knots (201 mph; 324 km/h) instead of the intended 184 knots (212 mph; 341 km/h). Airborne Express' procedures required the aircraft to be trimmed 1.5 knots (1.7 mph; 2.8 km/h) before the stall speed. Despite the incorrect trim setting, the aircraft would still have been recoverable from the stall. The NTSB concluded that Captain Lemming's incorrect trimming of the horizontal stabilizer was not a factor in the accident.

The NTSB examined N827AX's maintenance records and reviewed Airborne Express' procedures for testing the stall warning system, but could not determine why the stick shaker was inoperative during the accident flight. In addition, the flight crew's situational awareness that the aircraft was in a stall was short, as they were distracted by the compressor stall on the no. 2 engine and communications with ATC. The NTSB also stated that an angle of attack display on the flight deck could have helped the crew's situational awareness. The fact that the crew lacked a visual horizon at nighttime was another factor due to the aircraft being in instrument meteorological conditions (IMC) from the time the stall maneuver was performed until impact.

Neither Captain Avery nor Captain Lemming had ever flown a DC-8 post modification on an FEF until December 21 (the initial FEF that was aborted), though the director of flight technical programs authorized Avery to serve as a pilot in command on post modification FEF's.

=== Final report ===
The NTSB released the final report on July 15, 1997. The "probable cause" section stated the following:

The National Transportation Safety Board determines that the probable causes of this accident were the inappropriate control inputs applied by the flying pilot during a stall recovery attempt, the failure of the nonflying pilot-in-command to recognize, address, and correct these inappropriate control inputs, and the failure of ABX to establish a formal functional evaluation flight program that included adequate program guidelines, requirements and pilot training for performance of these flights. Contributing to the causes of the accident were the inoperative stick shaker stall warning system and the ABX DC-8 flight training simulator's inadequate fidelity in reproducing the airplane's stall characteristics.

— National Transportation Safety Board

The accident had been caused by pilot error due to captain Lemming's improper flight control inputs and captain Avery's failure to notice them. Another cause was Airborne Express failing to set up a proper program for FEFs, resulting in inadequate training. Contributing factors included the stick shaker being inoperative, inaccuracies in Airborne Express' flight simulators when simulating a stall, the compressor stall on the no. 2 engine which distracted the flight crew, the accident occurring at night (which resulted in the flight crew's lack of a visual horizon and other exterior cues), and Airborne Express not requiring flight tests to be completed before nightfall.

== Aftermath ==
The NTSB issued seven safety recommendations to the FAA. The NTSB also reiterated a previous recommendation regarding the angle of attack following the crash of American Airlines Flight 965 on December 20, 1995:

Require that all transport-category aircraft present pilots with angle of attack information in a visual format, and that all air carriers train their pilots to use the information to obtain maximum possible climb performance.

— National Transportation Safety Board

Lynn Scully, the wife of Brian Scully, filed a lawsuit against Airborne Express for $20 million.

Brian Scully's sister, Maureen DeMarco, was killed in the crash of Comair Flight 3272 on January 9, 1997. Maureen was headed to Brian's funeral.

== Dramatization ==
This accident was featured in season 25 of Mayday, titled "Fatal Test Flight".

== See also ==
- Air France Flight 447
- Air Transport International Flight 782, another non-scheduled DC-8 flight that crashed one year previously
- Colgan Air Flight 3407
- West Caribbean Airways Flight 708
- XL Airways Germany Flight 888T, another flight test where the aircraft stalled and crashed
- LAC Colombia Flight 028
