= Jaro International =

Romanian charter airline

- Founded: 1991
- Ceased operations: 2001
- Hubs: Aurel Vlaicu International Airport
- Headquarters: Bucharest, Romania

Jaro was a charter airline based in Băneasa, Romania. It operated from 1991 to 2001, when it was bankrupted.

== History ==
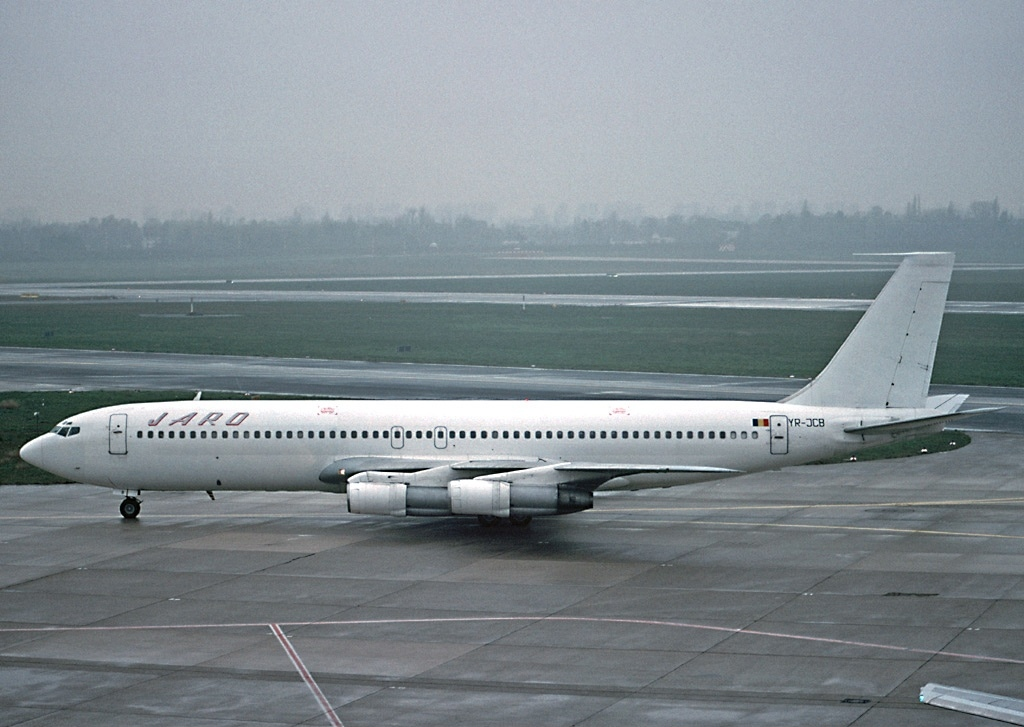
Jaro International 707 photographed at Düsseldorf in 1995

Jaro started operations in 1991 at Aurel Vlaicu International Airport, Bucharest's second airport, with one Boeing 707. In the same year, Jaro International started services to JFK International Airport, being the first Romanian airline apart from TAROM to fly over the Atlantic. In July 1997, the airline introduced weekly flights between Aurel Vlaicu and Montreal-Mirabel International Airport and Aurel Vlaicu and Toronto Pearson International Airport, where they stayed until 2000. These routes were abandoned because of the high competition from Tarom which was operating at Dorval and Pearson. In September 2001, the airline declared bankruptcy and made its last long haul flight and its last one from New York City.

== Services ==
In July 1997, Jaro was flying to three intercontinental and 17 European destinations:

North America: Montreal, New York City and Toronto

Europe: Bucharest, Düsseldorf, Vienna, Frankfurt, Girona, Hanover, London, Ostend (cargo only), Hamburg, Skopje, Palma de Mallorca, Berlin, Malta, Cologne, Southend (cargo only), Stockholm

== Fleet ==
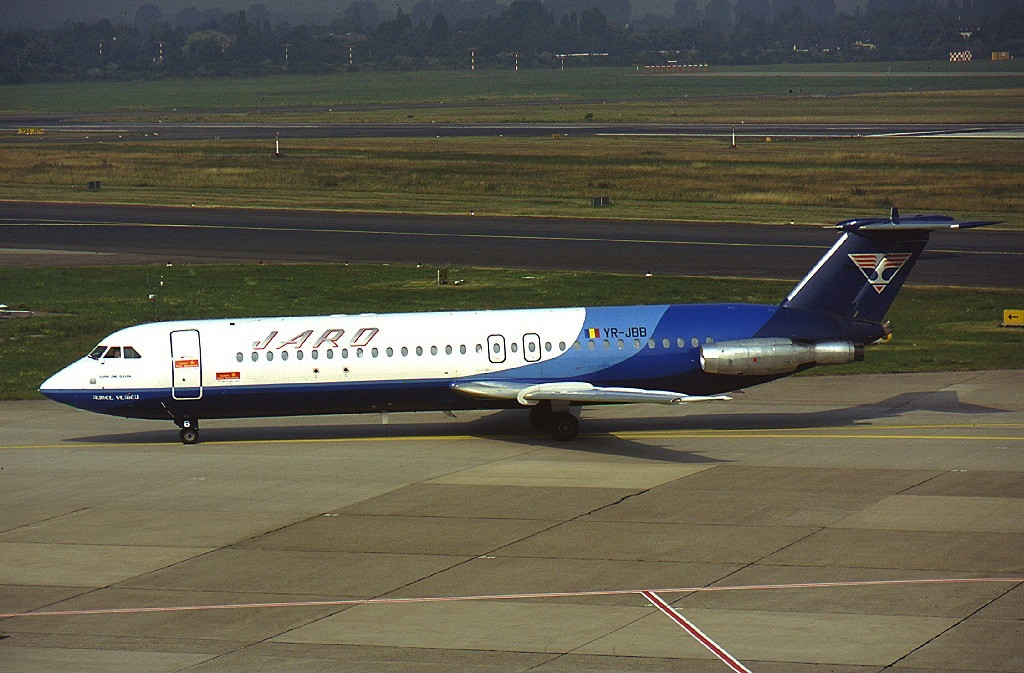
Jaro BAC 1-11 at Düsseldorf in 1996

(at July 2000)

- 3 Boeing 707 (one cargo)
- 2 BAC 1-11
- 1 Yakovlev Yak-42
