= Hispania Líneas Aéreas =

Spanish charter airline

IATA	ICAO	Call sign
HI (1982–1986); XF (1987–1989)	HSL	Sunbeam
- Founded: 1982
- Ceased operations: 1989
- Operating bases: Palma de Mallorca Airport

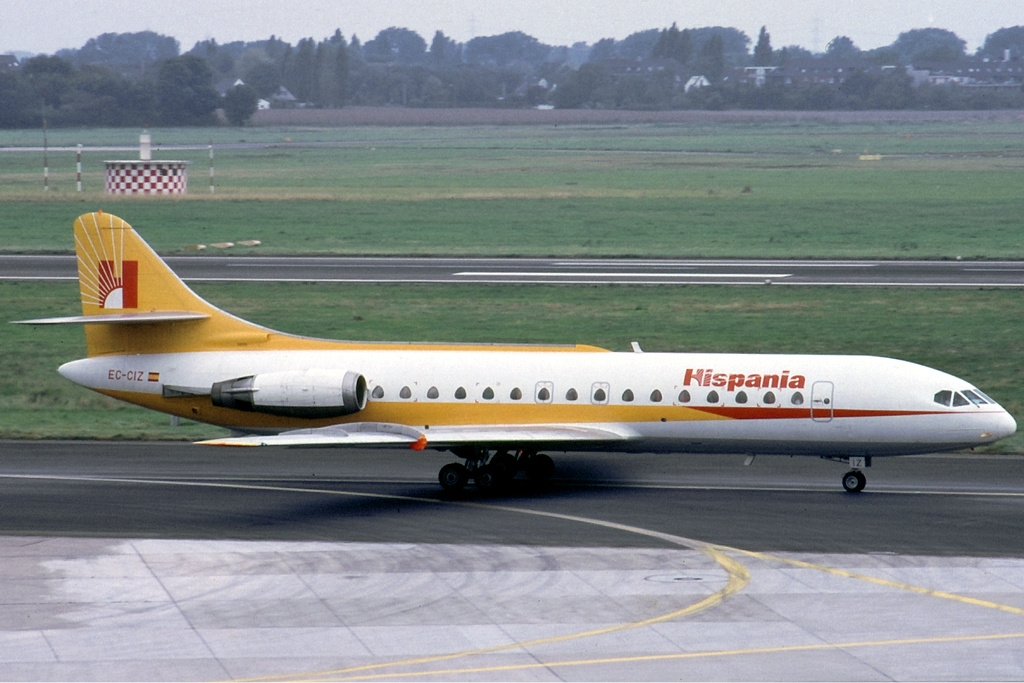
Sud Aviation Caravelle

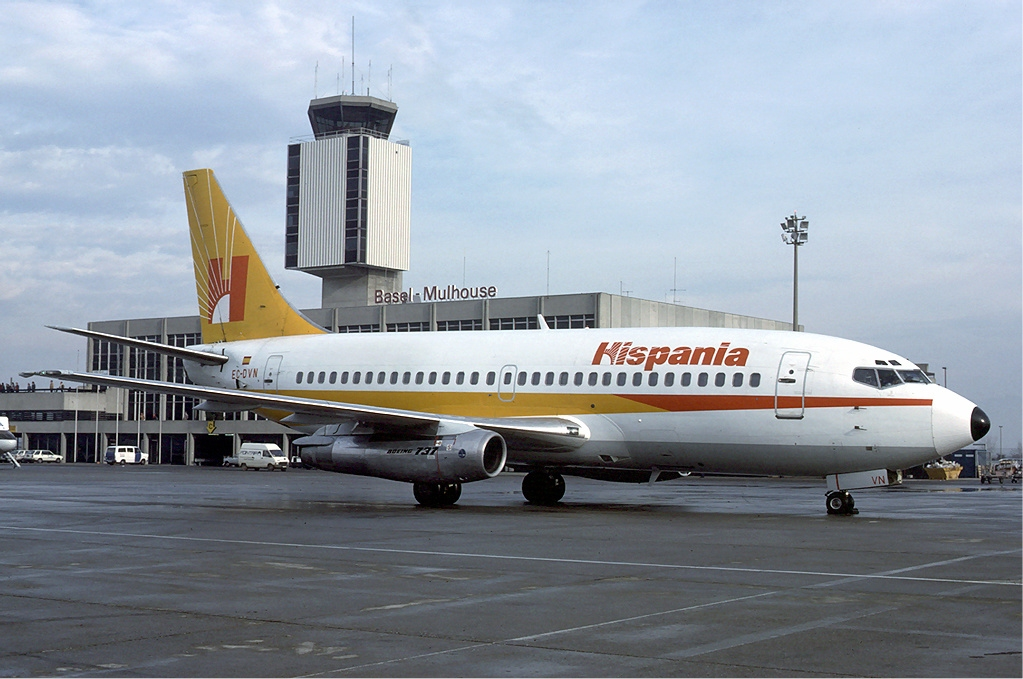
Boeing 737-200

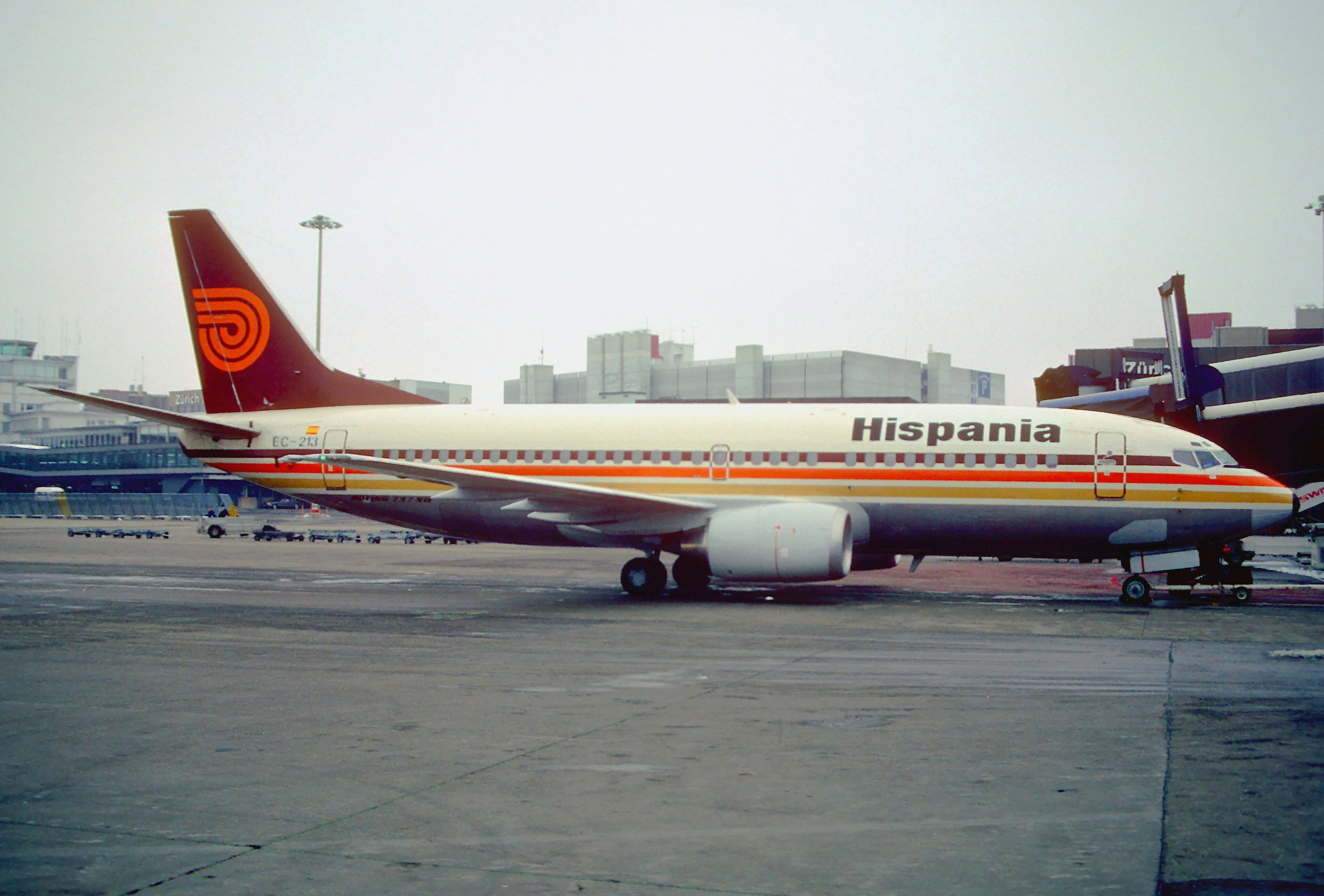
Hispania Boeing 737 in hi-brid Orion Airways colour scheme

Hispania Líneas Aéreas was a Spanish charter airline.

== Company history ==
Hispania was founded in 1982 as an on-demand charter operator and began operations using two SE 210 Caravelle aircraft on charter flights to the Spanish resorts from Great Britain, Germany, France and other countries. In 1985 three Boeing 737-200 were added and those eventually replaced all the Caravelles. As business increased, Hispania acquired a new fleet consisting of Boeing 737-300 and Boeing 757-200, however, the aircraft lease payments were too expensive for the carrier to sustain and in 1988 it was nearly acquired by Air Europa. After the attempted takeover and other cash-investment schemes failed, Hispania ceased operations in July 1989.

== Fleet details ==
- 3 - SE 210 Caravelle
- 3 - Boeing 737-200
- 8 - Boeing 737-300
- 2 - Boeing 757-23A(ER)
- 2 - Douglas DC-8-61 (leased from Nationair Canada)

== See also ==
- List of defunct airlines of Spain
