= Robert Obadia =

Canadian businessman

- Born: September 10, 1942 (age 84); Casablanca, Morocco
- Occupation: Businessman
- Status: Pled guilty to 8 counts of fraud
- Criminal charges: Fraud

Robert Obadia is the former owner of Nationair Canada and its parent company Nolisair. Obadia was charged with fraud after the bankruptcy of Nationair in 1993. Nationair was responsible in 1991 for the deadliest aviation disaster involving a Canadian-registered aircraft and the 15th-worst aviation disaster in history.

Obadia was born in Casablanca, Morocco in 1942 and graduated with a degree in electronics engineering from University of Grenoble in 1965. He immigrated to Montreal in 1967 after working for Royal Air Maroc and Air France. After arriving in Canada, he joined Quebecair, where he eventually became vice-president of charters before leaving in 1980 to start Nationair.

== Fraud and controversy ==
Obadia's company Nationair was declared bankrupt in May 1993. Controversy surrounded the fact that at the time of bankruptcy the company owed CDN$75,000,000 to the Canadian government, hundreds of creditors and employees due back wages. The controversy was further exacerbated by reports that Obadia had paid himself lavish dividends and salary, and taken low interest loans from the company.

After Nationair's bankruptcy, Obadia was indicted and pleaded guilty to eight counts of fraud in relation to the company's activities. Obadia was ordered by a Quebec court in 1993 to repay investors and creditors $234,000. Obadia never served any time in prison despite pleading to 8 counts of fraud.

Controversy also surrounded Nationair with reports and allegations of sub-standard safety practices. Media reports revealed that the carrier regularly flew aircraft that were not airworthy. This controversy was further exacerbated by media reports that Transport Canada was aware of these practices but did nothing about it. The Canadian federal government declared after an investigation, in 1998, that there were deficiencies in a number of operational and management areas at Nationair, especially in maintenance work. Twenty years after the crash of Nigeria Airways Flight 2120 (operated by a wet-leased Nationair Douglas DC-8), further reports of sub-standard aircraft maintenance emerged with Lina Colacci (whose 23-year-old sister Dolores Colacci, a flight attendant, died in the disaster) stating in a CTV News interview in July 2011 that her sister "had kept a journal, and she had written how she was scared that the safety of Nationair was lacking." In the same 2011 CTV News interview Lina Colacci recounted her deceased sister's journal entries that described Nationair's "staff implementing makeshift repairs, such as plugging up holes in the bathroom with rags".

Some of the surviving family members launched a wrongful death class-action lawsuit against Obadia's Nationair. But their efforts were fruitless in recouping any damages as Obadia declared his company bankrupt in 1993, leaving the surviving families with no legal recourse.

As of 2011, Obadia's whereabouts are unknown.
