= Montréal–Mirabel International Airport =

Airport serving Montreal, Quebec, Canada

Montréal–Mirabel International Airport Aéroport international Montréal-Mirabel

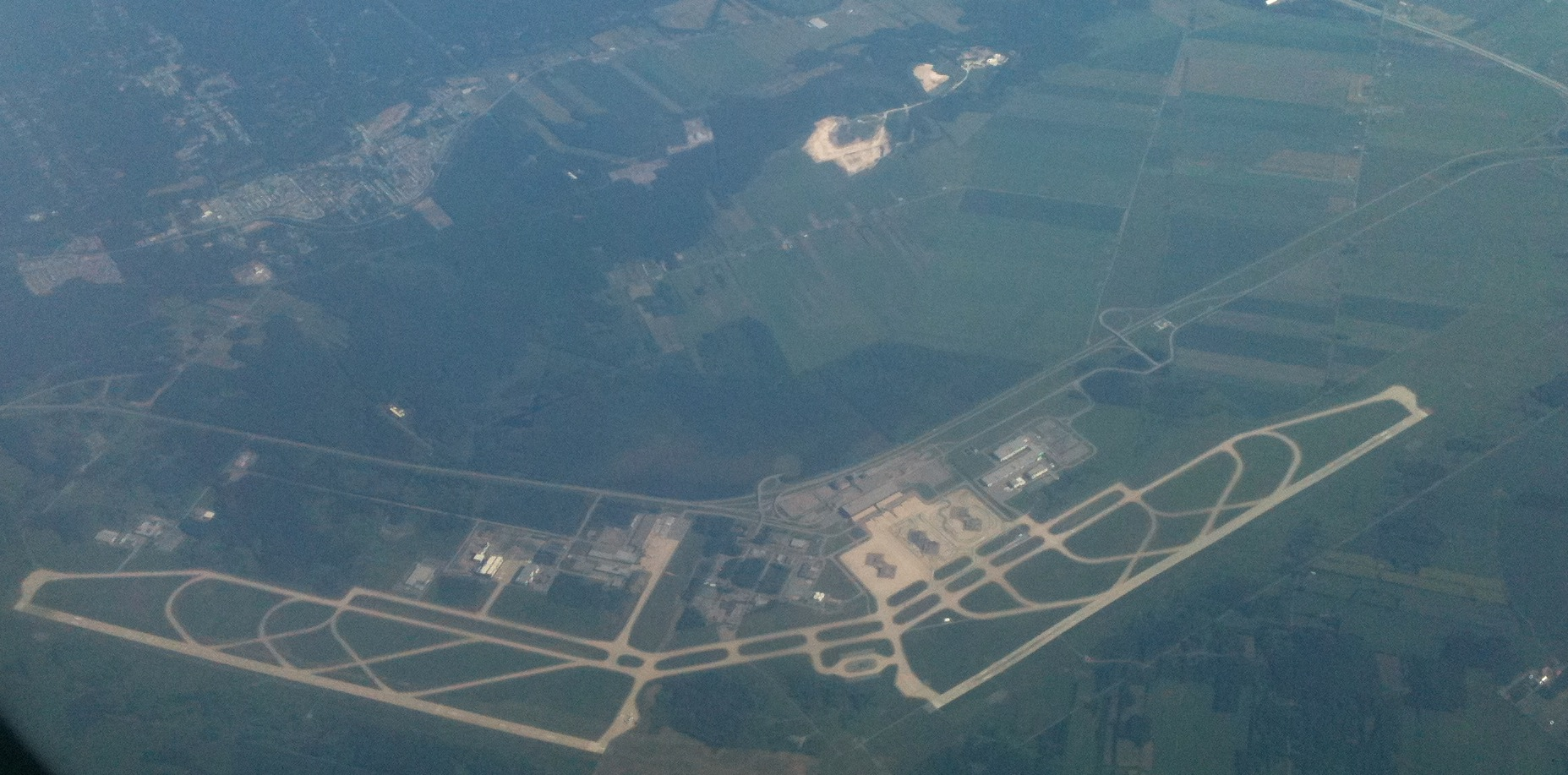
- IATA: YMX; ICAO: CYMX

Summary
- Airport type: Public
- Owner: Transport Canada
- Operator: Aéroports de Montréal
- Serves: Greater Montreal
- Location: Mirabel, Quebec, Canada
- Opened: October 4, 1975; 51 years ago
- Passenger services ceased: October 31, 2004; 22 years ago
- Time zone: EST (UTC−05:00)
  - Summer (DST): EDT (UTC−04:00)
- Elevation AMSL: 271 ft (83 m)
- Coordinates: 45°40′47″N 074°02′19″W
- Website: www.admtl.com

Map
- Location in Quebec Location in Canada Location in North America

Runways
Direction	Length		Surface
Direction	ft	m	Surface
06/24	12,000	3,658	Concrete
11/29	12,000	3,658	Concrete

Statistics (2022)
- Aircraft movements: 42,604
- Total cargo (metric tonnes): 87,746
- Sources: Canada Flight Supplement; Movements from Statistics Canada; Cargo from Aéroports de Montréal

Montréal–Mirabel International Airport (IATA: YMX, ICAO: CYMX), originally called Montréal International Airport, widely known as Mirabel and branded as YMX International Aerocity of Mirabel, is a cargo and former international passenger airport in Mirabel, Quebec, Canada, 21 nautical miles (39 km; 24 mi) northwest of Montreal. It opened on October 4, 1975, and the last commercial passenger flight took off on October 31, 2004.

The airport is mainly used for cargo flights, but it is also home to medevac and general aviation flights, and hosts a manufacturing plant for Airbus, where final assembly of the Airbus A220 (formerly Bombardier CSeries) is conducted. Bombardier Aviation produced the Bombardier CRJ700 series of regional jets at the factory until early 2021. The former passenger terminal apron is now a racing course, and the terminal building was demolished in 2016.

Prior to the demolition of the passenger terminal, Montréal–Mirabel International Airport was classified as an airport of entry (AOE) by Nav Canada and was staffed by the Canada Border Services Agency (CBSA). A smaller AOE for general aviation with no more than 15 people on board is still available from Hélibellule, Nolinor, and Mirajet. In addition it is one of ten Canadian airport classified as an airport of entry for cargo flights. It is part of the National Airports System and it was one of two airports in Canada with sufficient right-of-way that can be expanded to accommodate 50 million passengers per year, the other being Toronto Pearson International Airport. A lack of traffic meant that Mirabel was never expanded beyond its first phase. As a result of a controversial land expropriation, Mirabel would have been the largest airport in the world by surface area, with a planned area spanning a property totaling 39,660 hectares (396.6 km^{2}; 98,000 acres). In 1989, 32,780 hectares (81,000 acres) of that were deeded back to their original owners.

The airport was intended to replace the existing Dorval Airport (currently known as Montréal–Trudeau International Airport) as the eastern air gateway to Canada. Accordingly, from 1975 to 1997, all international flights to and from Montreal (except for flights to and from the United States) were required to use Mirabel. Mirabel's distant location, its inadequate transport links to urban centres, and the continued operation of domestic flights from Dorval Airport made Mirabel very unpopular with travellers and airlines. It did not help that Montreal's economy declined relative to that of Toronto during the 1970s and 1980s, while newer long-range airliners no longer needed to refuel in Montreal prior to trans-Atlantic flights, so passenger levels never approached the levels that had been anticipated. The original plan to eventually close Dorval was discarded, and Mirabel thus turned out to be a white elephant.

A decision was made to consolidate Montreal's passenger traffic at Dorval, with scheduled flights and charter flights being shifted in 1997 and 2004, so Mirabel was relegated to the role of a cargo airport. In 2004, Dorval Airport was renamed Montréal–Pierre Elliott Trudeau International Airport, after the Canadian prime minister whose government initiated the Mirabel project, the aim of which was to close and replace the Dorval airport. During the 2000s, Dorval was renovated and expanded, which enabled it to handle the passenger levels that the Trudeau government initially claimed would require two airports. Between 2008 and 2018, Mirabel's air traffic more than tripled due to the use of private passenger flights, helicopter flights and flight schools, leading to Aéroports de Montréal renaming the airport to YMX International Aerocity of Mirabel to emphasize it as a business facility.

== Development ==
=== Background ===
In the 1960s, Montreal experienced a tremendous economic boom. Massive construction projects, including the Montreal Metro and those linked with the hosting of Expo 67, brought the city international status. More and more visitors were arriving to the city, especially by airplane but not always by choice. The federal government required European airlines to make Montreal their only Canadian destination. That resulted in 15–20% annual growth in passenger traffic at the city's Dorval Airport. As noise levels rose due to the increased flights, a nighttime restriction on flights was imposed as a temporary measure to placate nearby residents, but this would not be a long-term solution. At the time runway expansion at Dorval would have required the expensive acquisition of land.

Optimistic about the city's future and its continuing ability to attract more and more visitors, government officials decided to build a new airport that would be more than able to absorb increased passenger traffic well into the 21st century.

The Canadian Department of Transport studied five possible sites for Montreal's new airport: Saint-Jean-sur-Richelieu (50 km (31 mi) to the southeast), Vaudreuil-Dorion (40 km (25 mi) to the west), Joliette (70 km (43 mi) to the north), St-Amable (30 km (19 mi) to the southeast), and Ste-Scholastique (60 km (37 mi) to the northwest).

The federal government proposed that the airport should be located at Vaudreuil-Dorion. Not only was it well served by existing road and rail routes, but it was close enough to both Ottawa and Montreal to serve as the gateway for both cities. However, Quebec Premier Robert Bourassa, who had a frosty relationship with Prime Minister Pierre Trudeau, reportedly did not want such an important project to be placed so close to the provincial border fearing the exodus of airport workers to Ontario. The Bourassa government preferred that the new airport be situated in Drummondville (100 km (62 mi) to the east) where it could be a gateway to Quebec City as well as Montreal.

=== Expropriation ===
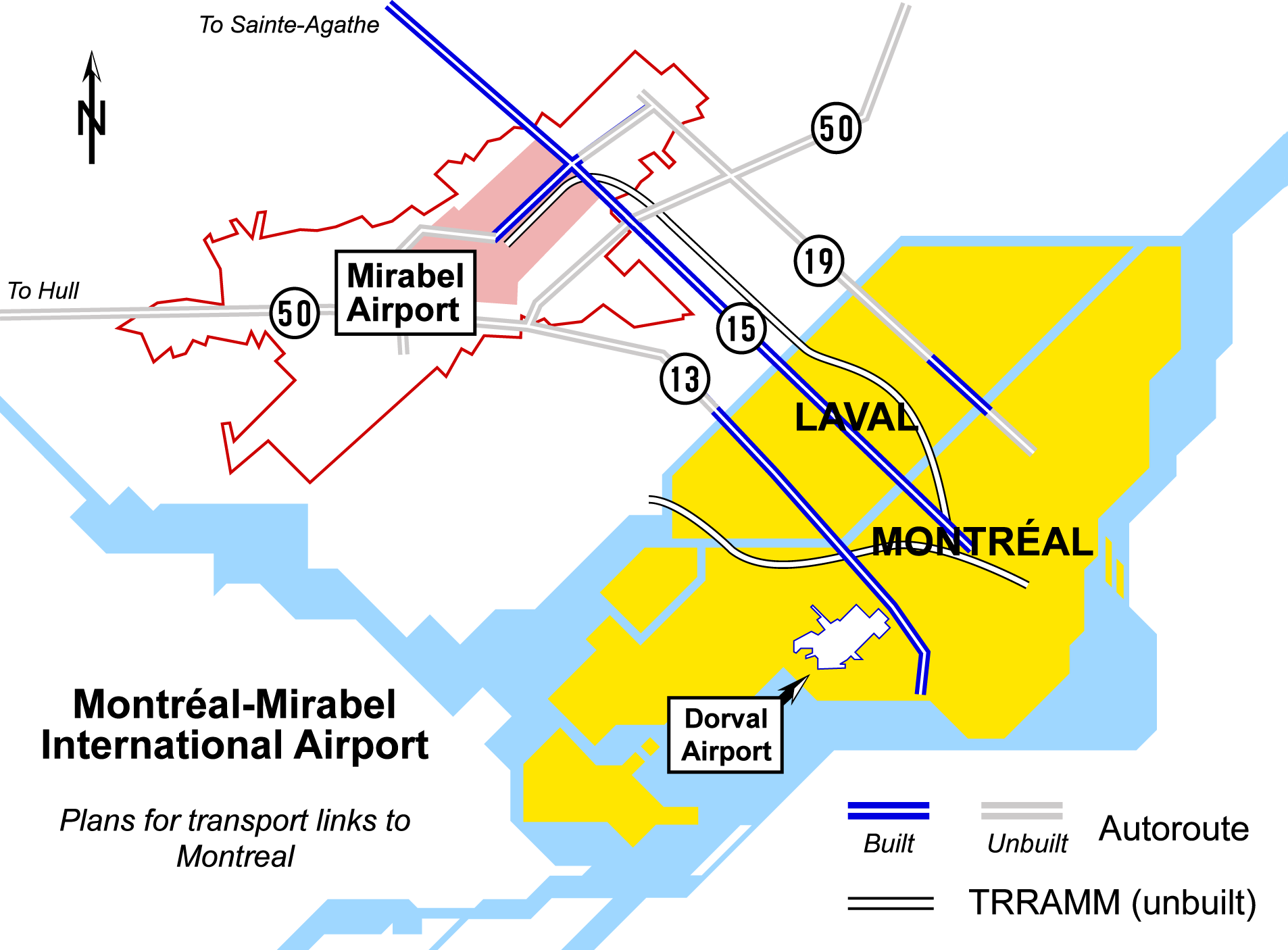
Diagram of planned transport links serving Mirabel Airport

In March 1969, the federal and provincial governments reached a compromise to locate at the St. Scholastique site, and proposals were drawn up to expropriate 39,250 hectares (97,000 acres), an area larger than the entire city of Montreal. This area is served only by a long road link via Autoroute 15 and Autoroute 50. An additional link via Autoroute 13 was planned but never completed. Also planned was the connection of Autoroute 50 to the Ottawa/Gatineau area, a goal which would not be achieved until decades later, in 2012.

The federal government expropriation resulted in making Mirabel the world's largest airport by property area. The airport's planned operations zone, which encompassed what was eventually built plus expansion room, amounted to only 6,880 hectares (17,000 acres), about 19% of the total area of the property. The federal government planned to use the excess land as a noise buffer and as an industrial development zone (which was never started). This attracted the ire of the people of St. Scholastique who protested vehemently against the expropriation of their land. Nevertheless, construction started in June 1970 under the auspices of BANAIM, a government organization formed to build the airport. The architects charged with the design were Papineau, Gérin-Lajoie, LeBlanc, Edwards.

Urban rail transit – the system was to be capable of speeds from 100 to 120 kilometres per hour (62 to 75 mph) for the Montréal–Mirabel run – initially to be called TRRAMM (Transport Rapide Régional Aéroportuaire Montréal–Mirabel), was intended to be completed at a later date. However, it never got beyond the drawing board. The TRRAMM system was also intended to eventually be expanded to other parts of the Montreal region. The major stumbling block for the TRRAMM project was funding. The federal, provincial, and municipal governments never managed to find enough cash to fund the highly ambitious and expensive rapid transit project. Thus, Mirabel was forced to cope with an inadequate road system and non-existent rail transit, supplemented only by express buses.

== Operational history and decline ==
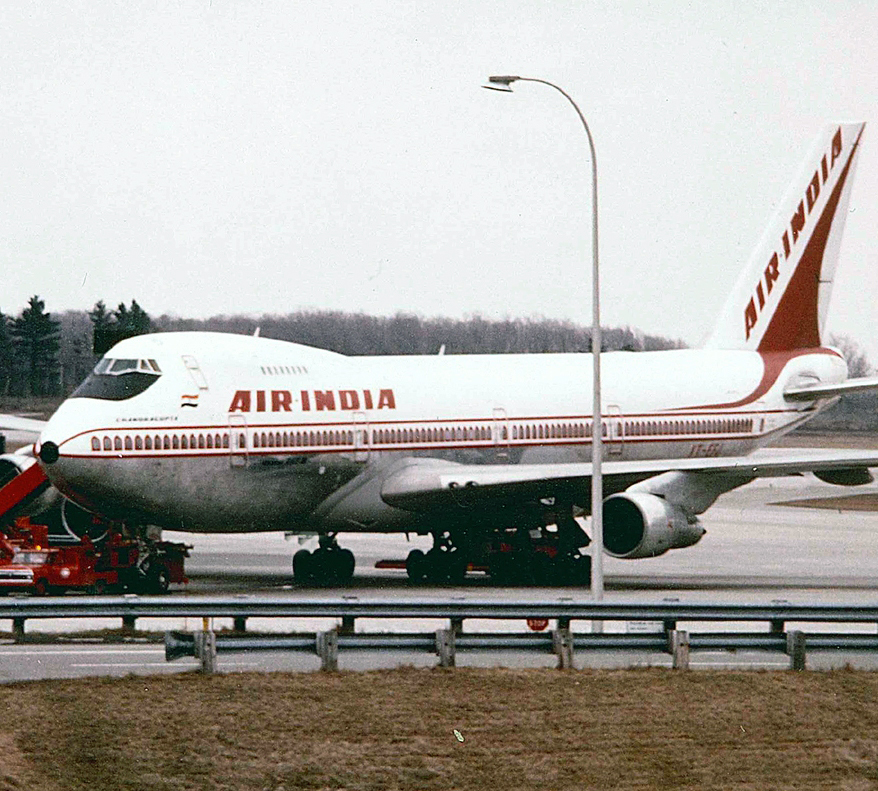
Air India Boeing 747-200 at Montréal–Mirabel International Airport in 1983

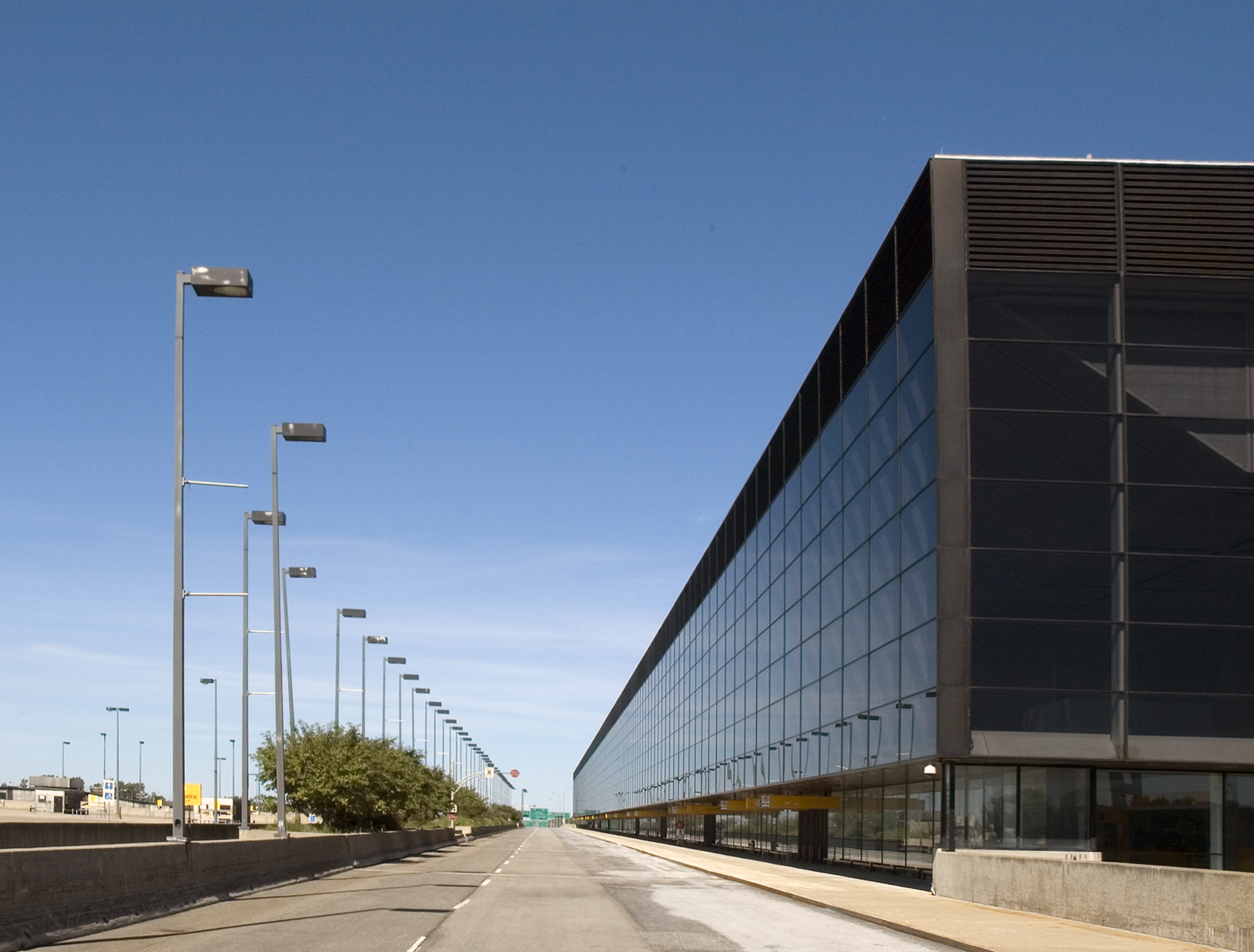
The passenger terminal before its demolition

Montréal–Mirabel International Airport opened for business on October 4, 1975, in time for the 1976 Summer Olympics. In the rush to get the airport open in time for the Olympics, it was decided to transfer flights to Mirabel in two stages. International flights were transferred immediately, while domestic and US flights would continue to be served by Dorval airport until 1982. To ensure Mirabel's survival, all international flights for Montreal were banned from Dorval from 1975 to 1997.

The federal government originally predicted that Dorval would be completely saturated by 1985 as part of its justification for building Mirabel. They also projected that 20 million passengers would be passing through Montreal's airports annually, with 17 million of those through Mirabel. However, several factors dramatically reduced the amount of projected air traffic into Dorval.

Montreal began to decline in importance as an aviation hub after 1974 because of the increasing use of longer-range jets that did not need to refuel in Montreal before crossing the Atlantic from the major Western North American cities. The use of longer-range aircraft was made more attractive by national energy policies that provided Montreal refineries with feedstock at prices substantially below world prices, starting in 1975 and ending in the 1980s with the drop in world oil prices. Montreal was also overtaken by Toronto as Canada's main business centre around this time, due to the Quebec nationalism and French-only language laws that caused numerous companies and non-French residents to move to Toronto.

More importantly, the simultaneous operation of Mirabel solely for international flights and Dorval only for continental flights made Montreal less attractive to airlines and travelers alike, in contrast to other cities with multi-airport systems (New York City, Tokyo) where each airport operates independently in allowing international flights to connect to domestic flights. The planned but unbuilt highways and incomplete train routes connecting Mirabel to Montreal compounded the problem. Montrealers grew to resent Mirabel as they were forced to travel far out of town for international flights, as while Dorval was only 20 minutes away from the city core, it took 50 minutes to get to Mirabel even in ideal traffic conditions. International passengers who used Montreal in transit to another destination in Canada or to the United States had to take hour-long bus rides for connections from their international flights at Mirabel to their domestic flights at Dorval, unnecessarily complicating their journeys. Many international airlines, faced with the stark economic reality of operating two eastern Canadian points of entry, opted to bypass Montreal altogether and shifted their routes to Toronto Pearson with its straightforward domestic and US connections.

By 1991, Mirabel and Dorval were handling only a total of 8 million passengers and 112,000 tons of cargo annually, while Toronto Pearson was handling 18.5 million passengers and 312,000 tons of cargo. Mirabel alone never managed to exceed 3 million passengers per year in its existence as a passenger airport. It soon became apparent that the additional capacity from the opening of Mirabel became redundant. Although this redundancy would have been resolved if Dorval was decommissioned as originally intended, public pressure in support of Dorval prevented its planned closure. Another obstacle of the planned transfer from Dorval to Mirabel was Air Canada's desire to keep flights in Dorval, with its proximity to AVEOS workshops, and the connections in Pearson Airport.

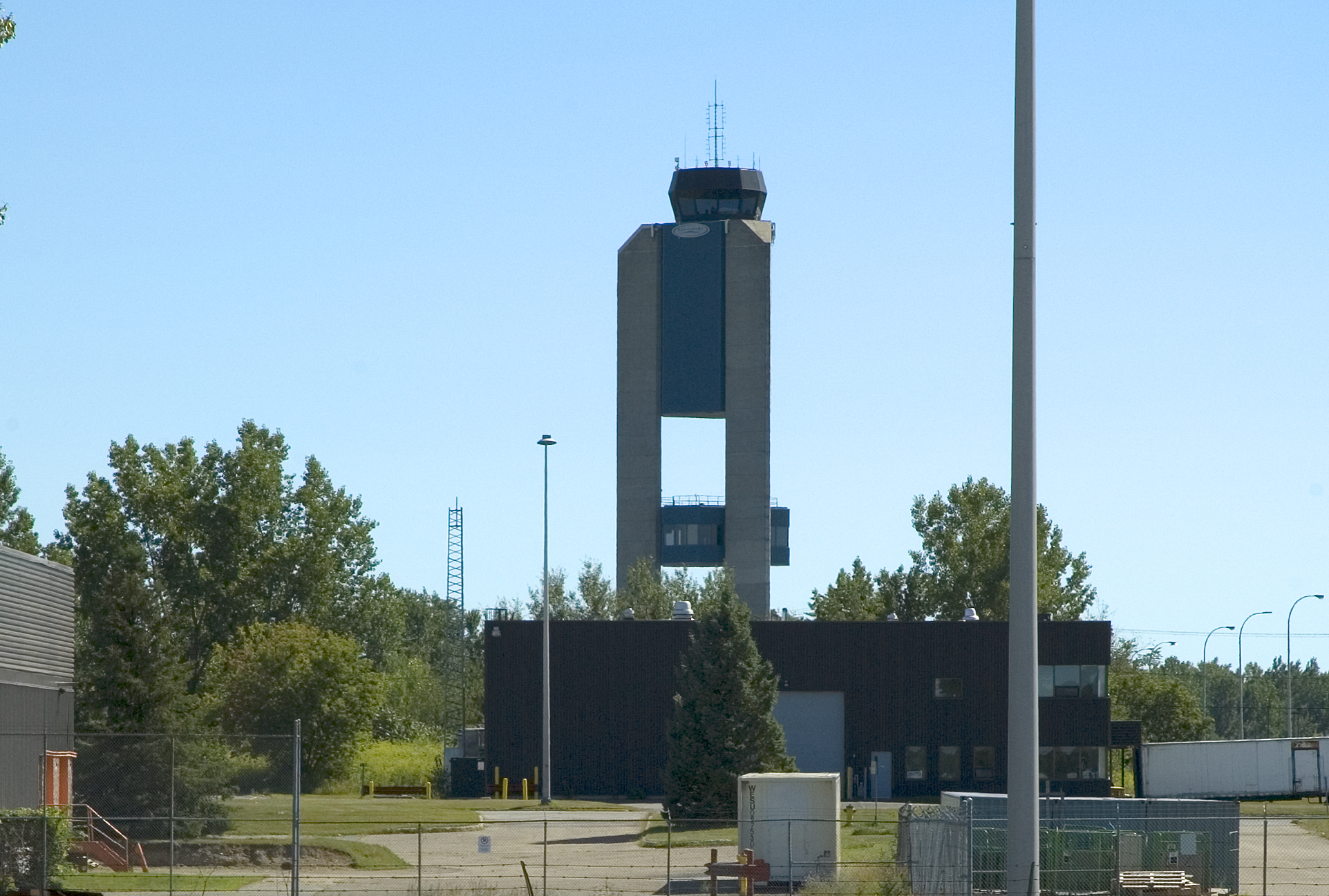
The control tower, Mirabel Airport

The simultaneous operating of both Montreal airports without permitting connections resulted in Dorval being overtaken in traffic first by Toronto, then Vancouver and then relegated to fourth by Calgary for a period of time, as international airlines were slow to return to Dorval after it resumed handling international flights in 1997. Only Air Transat held out at Mirabel until the very end, operating the last commercial flight which departed to Paris on October 31, 2004.

Over time, the decreasing passenger flights began to take a toll on businesses within Mirabel. Particularly notable was the 354-room Chateau Aeroport-Mirabel hotel adjacent to the terminal, which was forced to shut down in 2002 after 25 years of operation.

=== Debate ===
In the late 1990s, Maclean's magazine interviewed one resident whose farm was expropriated, who said that his land was sacrificed to save the city. He was particularly critical of the Trudeau government for not closing Dorval as well as failing to recognize Mirabel's potential, as no legislation similar to the Wright Amendment in the United States was enacted that would force airlines to use Mirabel instead of Dorval.

Supporters of making Mirabel the sole international airport of Montreal pointed out that it had the capacity to be expanded significantly to meeting growing future demand, unlike Dorval. They also noted that Dorval could be closed and its land be developed for prime real estate, and some of the profits could go towards improving access routes to Mirabel and/or the airport itself.

The initial location of Mirabel was supposed to be a major justification for the project not only because of its expansion room but also the afforded buffer, which would significantly reduce noise pollution in urban areas.

=== 21st century ===
The C$716 million expansion of Dorval from 2000 to 2005 gave it the ability to serve 20 million passengers a year, accomplishing one of the goals that was to be met with the construction of Mirabel. (In the 1970s, the federal government had projected that 20 million passengers would be passing through Montreal's airports annually by 1985, with 17 million through Mirabel.) Aéroports de Montréal financed all of these improvements itself, with no government grants.

Today, Montréal–Mirabel International Airport is used almost exclusively for cargo flights, with passenger operations having ceased on October 31, 2004, 29 years after the airport's opening and many years of limited, primarily charter service. Bombardier Aerospace launches newly constructed units from its factory at Mirabel.

With very little and then no airline service, and with many empty spaces inside its terminal, Mirabel was the setting of several movies, TV series, and commercials for many years. The 2004 film The Terminal features the mezzanine overlooking the immigration desks and the baggage carousels directly behind them, the tarmac and the main terminal entrance (with a digitally added New York skyline reflection). All other terminal scenes were shot on a soundstage.

In 2006, I-Parks Creative Industries, a French firm that specializes in the creation of urban tourist attractions, and Oger International SA, the global engineering company owned by the family of slain former Lebanese prime minister and entrepreneur Rafik Hariri, entered into an agreement to turn Mirabel into a theme park. The proposed concept of the park is based on the theme of water and outer space. By August 2008, negotiations, market research, and technical assessments were continuously delayed, and construction not started.

In December 2006, in a move he called "correcting a historical injustice", Prime Minister Stephen Harper announced the return of 4,450 ha of farmland expropriated to build Mirabel airport. About 125 farmers, who rent their land from the federal government, were permitted to buy it back. Harper said he was pleased to finish the work started by former prime minister, Brian Mulroney, who unlocked a major parcel of expropriated land during his first term in office in 1985.

In May 2007, it was reported that the International Center of Advanced Racing had signed a 25-year lease with Aéroports de Montréal to use part of the airport as a race track. At the same time, fixed-base operator Hélibellule opened a facility at the site to cater for the private jets that were expected. The company also provides a passenger service from Mirabel to destinations in Canada and the United States. They operate three different types of helicopters; Bell 222, Robinson R22 and Aérospatiale Gazelle. As of 2019, international passengers and crew can be processed at the Hélibellule FBO. A total of 15 people can be processed from general aviation aircraft. In August 2007, AirMédic moved from its base at Montréal/Saint-Hubert Airport to Mirabel. AirMédic is a non-profit humane foundation serving the population of Quebec and its visitors with the service of air ambulances. It offers MEDEVAC flights using a Eurocopter Dauphin.

In August 2008, the former Agence métropolitaine de transport said it was willing to extend its commuter rail service to the airport if passenger traffic were to return. The Deux-Montagnes station is only some 12 km (7.5 mi) from the airport.

In July 2010, the ADM confirmed that I-Parks Creative Industries's long-delayed AeroDream project was dead, officially cancelling it. At present there are no plans for any alternative development at the site.

From 2011, the NASCAR Canadian Tire Series, drag racing, and other forms of motorsport began running on the airport's runways and surrounding areas, on what is known as Circuit ICAR.

On September 16, 2013, the Bombardier CS100 took its maiden flight for the first time, making the inaugural flight of the CSeries, from Mirabel Airport, accompanied by a Global 5000 chase plane.

=== Demolition of terminal building ===
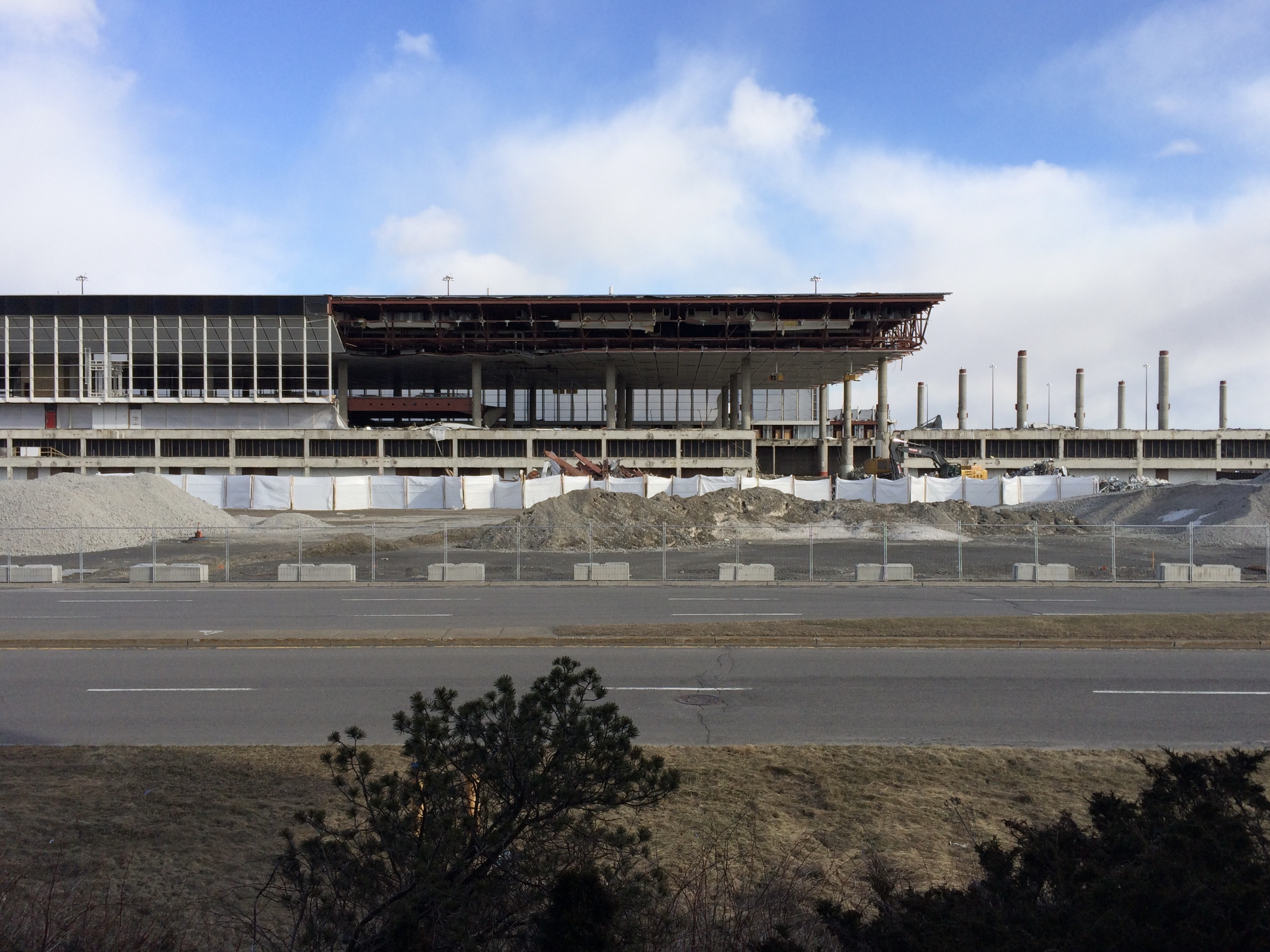
Terminal demolition in progress

On May 1, 2014, Aeroports de Montréal confirmed that Mirabel Airport's terminal building would be demolished, citing its high maintenance cost as a reason, as well as its facilities being unfit for commercial aviation needs and lacking any economic viability. Aéroports de Montréal had spent $30 million in maintenance over a decade, while renovations to keep it operational were estimated at $25 million. Several reports suggested that it would simply be less expensive to rebuild a new smaller budget terminal to attract the interests of ultra low cost carriers, such as Flair Airlines, Lynx Air or Swoop, however no plans for a return to commercial air services at Mirabel ever materialized. Mirabel Mayor Jean Bouchard was disappointed as the demolition would result in a significant loss of tax revenues for his municipality.

A demolition contract was awarded to Delsan on September 16, 2014, which proceeded with the demolition of the terminal building and surrounding parking structures. Demolition costs had been estimated up to $15 million and were expected to take less than a year to complete. Demolition of the terminal building began in mid-November 2014 and was completed in August 2016. The adjacent abandoned Chateau Aeroport hotel, and its connecting terminal skyway, were left standing, albeit in a deteriorating state.

=== Renewal of airport activity ===
Between 2008 and 2018, Mirabel airport's air traffic more than tripled. The trend rose sharply as of 2016 with the increase of use of the terminal by private passenger flights, helicopter flights and a rise in nearby flight schools. Nolinor offers daily flights abroad for employees of various companies, and many medical airplanes now use Mirabel airport as well. Consequently, the airport's air traffic control tower was refurbished and reopened with air traffic controllers specifically trained for it, following a decision in early 2019.

On July 11, 2016, Aéroports de Montréal announced that Pama Manufacturing planned to build a medical supply plant on a part of the 400,000 m^{2} (4,300,000 sq ft) site of the former passenger terminal complex, and that Mirajet was building an airpark at the foot of the air traffic control tower with 20 hangars available for lease to civil and business aviation clients. Other tenants at the time included Bombardier Aerospace, Pratt & Whitney Canada's Mirabel Aerospace Centre, Stelia Aerospace (formerly Aerolia), L3 Communication Mas, Avianor and Nolinor, as well as specialized services, creating a total of 3,700 direct jobs at the airport. The Bombardier CSeries (now the Airbus A220 series) continues to be assembled at Mirabel.

On May 9, 2019, Aéroports de Montréal announced that the airport would be renamed as 'YMX International Aerocity of Mirabel' as part of ADM's new branding. Under this brand, business will be the main focus of Mirabel while Montréal-Trudeau will be branded as a travel destination.

On January 30, 2020, Mirabel airport became a Class C airspace twelve years after becoming a flight service station due to a resurgence in air traffic volume. More than 69,000 movements were reported in 2017, and 72,000 in 2018. The air traffic control service is in service 16 hours a day, from 6:00 AM to 10:00 PM local time. The Class C control zone becomes an advisory Class E — Mirabel was a Class E airspace since 2008 — when the tower is not in operation.

== Architecture and layout ==
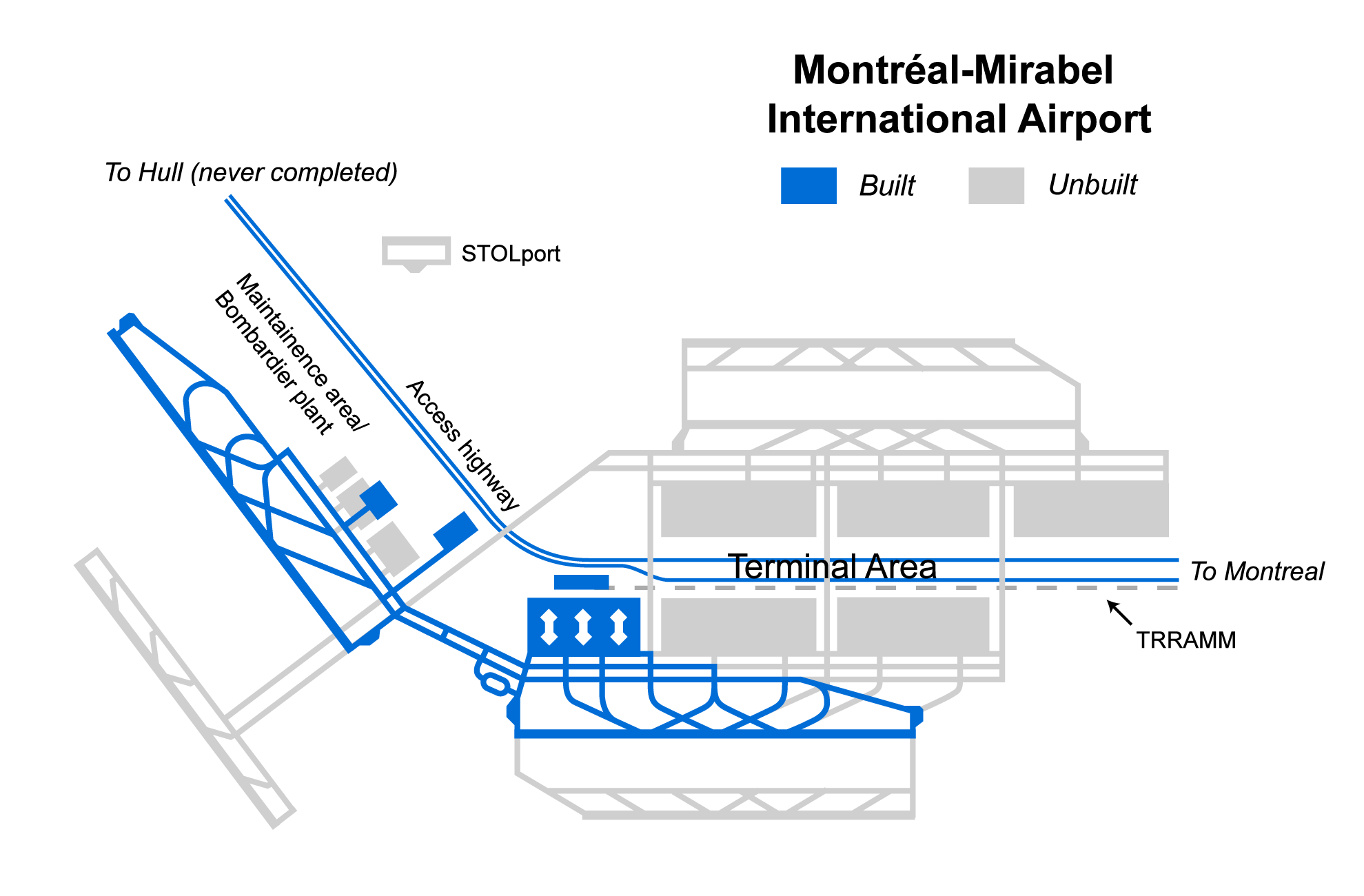
Plan of Mirabel Airport showing built and unbuilt facilities

Mirabel was designed to be eventually expanded to six runways and six terminal buildings, with a separate STOLport also planned. The expansion was supposed to occur in a number of phases and be completed by 2000, with the expectation of serving at least 60 million passengers by the year 2025. However, the airport never got beyond the first phase of construction, and by October 2005 runway 11/29 was closed leaving only runway 06/24 operational. In December 2009 runway 11/29 reopened with a length of 2,700 m (8,800 ft) and in April 2012 was restored to its 3,700 m (12,000 ft) length.

From the farthest reach of the parking lot to the airplane seat, one could walk as little as 200 m (656 ft). A train station was also built in the basement for the planned TRRAMM commuter rail service by Société de transport de Montréal (STCUM), right below the main passenger concourse (and more recently Agence métropolitaine de transport, successor to STCUM, had planned to extend the Saint-Jérôme line to the airport.).

The airport was designed by architects Papineau Gérin-Lajoie Le Blanc, who met at McGill's School of Architecture in the 1950s (under the tutelage of John Bland), founded their company in 1960, and parted ways in 1973 before the airport opened its doors after Papineau and another architect, Gordon Buchanan Edwards, left the firm. Mirabel's terminal carried over the bureau's award-winning Expo 67 Quebec pavilion design. A minimalist dark glass box sitting on top of a concrete bunker housing maintenance services, the terminal was hailed as an architectural triumph when it first opened.

Passengers walked as little as 100 m (328 ft) going from the curb to the gate. Once there, passengers would be transported to their aircraft by Passenger Transfer Vehicles (PTVs), rather than walking through jetways. The PTVs, similar to those at Washington Dulles International Airport, ran from the terminal to the aircraft parking spot on the ramp. It was reported by Radio-Canada/Canadian Broadcasting Corporation that each of these vehicles had cost up to C$ 400,000 at the time. To eventually make connections between flights easier, the terminal also included a few jetways, in a smaller concourse called the Aeroquay, accessible via a tunnel and later connected directly to the main concourse.

The planners were inspired by Dallas Fort Worth International Airport's planned design scheme, which utilized a central "spine road" through the middle of the airport, bringing the main surface transport artery through the center of the airport, with decentralized terminals arranged along the spine road. This spine road was planned to have four lanes, with the capacity to expand to eight lanes, and room made in the median for an automated people mover to connect the terminals.

The six planned runways were to be arranged in three pairs of parallel runways. Two pairs were to be oriented northeast–southwest (the prevailing wind direction), and one pair would be oriented east–west (crosswind). These were to provide capacity for 160 takeoffs and landings every hour, allowing 630,000 annual movements. The runways' lengths would have varied, with the shortest being 3,048 meters (10,000 feet), and the longest being 4,572 meters (15,000 feet). The separate STOLport would have a 610-meter (2,000 feet) runway.

The airport had provisions for large cargo areas, aircraft maintenance an area for general aviation, and an airport industrial park.

== Unbuilt passenger rail service (TRRAMM) ==
TRRAMM (Transport Rapide Régional Aéroportuaire Montréal-Mirabel) was a planned airport rail link between Mirabel and downtown Montreal. It was intended to have been completed by 1980, and to eventually be expanded to serve other parts of the greater Montreal region. Trains were to reach speeds of 160 km per hour (100 miles per hour), and to travel between the airport and downtown Montreal in 30 minutes.

== Airlines and destinations ==
=== Passenger ===
There are no longer any scheduled public operations at the airport. As of 2019, Mirabel does have a passenger terminal for private flights as well as helicopter flights. In addition, Mirabel airport was used for daily flights transporting employees for various mining companies by the Nolinor airline company.

==== Former passenger operations ====
Mirabel opened with service from local airlines Air Canada, Canadian Pacific Airlines and Nordair, as well as airlines from more than fifteen countries, including Aer Lingus, Aeroflot, Air France, Alitalia, British Airways, Czechoslovak Airlines, El Al, Iberia, KLM, Lufthansa, Olympic Airways, Sabena, Scandinavian Airlines, Swissair and TAP Air Portugal. These airlines had their national country flags posted in front of the terminal on the inauguration of Mirabel.

Other airlines that served Mirabel at some point included Aerolíneas Argentinas, Aeroméxico, Air India, Air Liberté, Allegheny Airlines, Business Express Airlines (operating as Northwest Airlink), Continental Airlines, Corsairfly, Cubana de Aviación, Eastern Air Lines, Finnair, Jaro International, Jat Airways, LAN Chile, LOT Polish Airlines, Northwest Airlines, Pan Am, People Express Airlines, Presidential Airways, Royal Air Maroc, Royal Jordanian, TAROM, USAir and Varig. Most gradually lost faith in Mirabel and either transferred to Dorval in 1997 or pulled out of Montreal altogether.

Several charter airlines also served Mirabel, such as Wardair, Nolisair, Canada 3000 and Royal Aviation. All four have either merged or gone bankrupt. In 2004, Skyservice and Air Transatlantic were the only charter airlines still in operation at Mirabel when passenger service ended. Air Transat is the only charter airline that started operations at Mirabel and stayed until the end of passenger service in 2004.

=== Cargo ===
Airlines	Destinations
Cargojet	Calgary, Cincinnati, East Midlands, Edmonton, Hamilton (ON), Halifax, Moncton, Vancouver, Winnipeg
Castle Aviation	Hamilton (ON), Plattsburgh
DHL Aviation	Cincinnati
FedEx Express	Indianapolis, Memphis, Ottawa
Morningstar Air Express	Halifax, Moncton, Quebec City, Toronto–Pearson
Pascan Aviation	Quebec City
UPS Airlines	Louisville

== Statistics ==
Passenger statistics and aircraft movements for Mirabel International Airport
Year	Total passengers	Aircraft movements
2000	1,276,227	48,696
2001	1,410,910	44,887
2002	982,511	41,153
2003	973,953	40,376
2004	921,926	36,720
2005		31,505
2006		29,707
2007		26,227
2008		
2009		27,225
2010		35,087
2011		37,362
2012		32,141
2013		31,968
2014		38,588
2015		35,490
2016		33,906
2017		53,268
2018		55,421
2019		71,656
2020		56,877
2021		66,572
2022		42,604
2023		40,480

== Other facilities ==
- Airbus (formerly Bombardier Aerospace) houses its A220 assembly line on the property of Mirabel Airport.
- Bell Helicopter manufactures all its commercial helicopters at a plant located adjacent to the airport. It once served as the assembly plant for Bell 505 helicopters.
- Nolisair (Nationair), during its existence, had its head office in the Nationair Building on the airport property.

== Incidents and accidents ==
The following accidents or notable incidents occurred either at the airport, or involved aircraft using the airport:

- June 23, 1985: Air India Flight 182, a Boeing 747-200B flying from Toronto Pearson International Airport to Mumbai's Sahar International Airport, with stopovers at Mirabel and London Heathrow, was bombed while flying the Mirabel-Heathrow segment over the Atlantic Ocean, All 307 passengers and 22 crew were killed. It was the deadliest terrorist attack in Canadian history and the world's deadliest act of aviation terrorism until the September 11 attacks.
- January 21, 1995: Royal Air Maroc Flight 205, a Boeing 747-400 preparing to depart for New York City and Casablanca, was being de-iced by Canadian Airlines groundcrew, while its engines were running. Due to a communications error, the pilot believed de-icing was complete and started taxiing forward. Two deicing vehicles that were still in place in front of both horizontal stabilizers were knocked down, killing three de-icing crew members and seriously injuring the two drivers.
- June 18, 1998: Propair Flight 420, a Fairchild Swearingen Metroliner flying from Dorval International Airport (now Montréal-Trudeau International Airport) to Peterborough Airport in Peterborough, Ontario, experienced a wing/engine fire during the initial climb. It attempted an emergency landing at Mirabel, but crashed near the beginning of the runway, in part due to a landing gear failure. The two pilots and the nine passengers on board were killed.
- September 11, 2001, Mirabel International Airport participated in Operation Yellow Ribbon and took in 10 diverted flights that had been bound for the closed airspace over the United States.

== See also ==
- List of airports in the Montreal area
- Mirabel Aerospace Centre
- Air India Flight 182
- Kertajati International Airport — another "white elephant" airport with similar premise to Montreal Mirabel airport.
- Pickering Airport Lands, a cancelled proposal for a second airport serving Toronto, conceived around the same time that Mirabel was built
- Rickenbacker International Airport — another airport that primarily serves cargo flights

== Notes ==
- Financial Times of Canada. (1975). Mirabel. Special ed. Don Mills, ON: Financial Times of Canada.
- Aeroports de Montréal ADM History
- Durivage, Simon."Mirabel, airport of the year 2000." Montreal, Montreal. September 8, 1992. Video Archive.
- Radio-Canada, "De Mirabel à Dorval", May 14, 1999, Web archive (in French)
