= Mirabel Aerospace Centre =

Coordinates: 45.6765°N 74.0563°W

The Mirabel Aerospace Centre (MAC), in Mirabel, Quebec, supports flight testing for Pratt & Whitney Canada engines, including turboprops and turbofans up to 90,000 pounds (41,000 kg) of thrust. A 300,000-square-foot (28,000 m^{2}) facility, the Mirabel Aerospace Centre represents a $360-million investment. Approximately 300 people are employed at the facility located within Montréal–Mirabel International Airport.

== Phase I ==
The first phase of the project, a flight test operations centre, was expected to be completed at a cost of $100 million. The province of Quebec contributed $7.5 million on the first phase.

== Phase II ==
Phase II of the Mirabel Aerospace Centre includes construction of a highly advanced assembly and test facility. At the new facility, P&WC assembles and tests the PurePower PW1524G for the Bombardier CSeries and the PW800 engine family for the next generation of large business jets.

== See also ==
- Pratt & Whitney PW1000G
