= Nigeria Airways Flight 2120 =

1991 aviation accident in Saudi Arabia

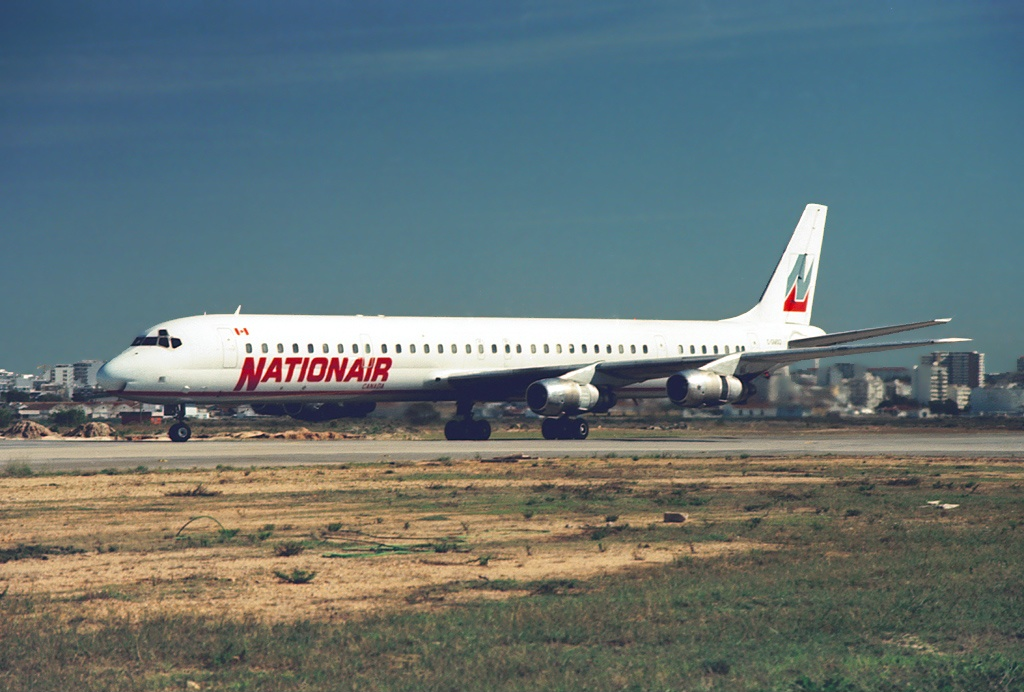
- C-GMXQ, the aircraft involved in the accident, seen in 1989

Accident
- Date: 11 July 1991
- Summary: Under-inflated tyre overheating, leading to an uncontrolled in-flight fire
- Site: King Abdulaziz International Airport, Jeddah, Saudi Arabia; 21°38′13″N 39°10′23″E

Aircraft
- Aircraft type: Douglas DC-8-61
- Operator: Nationair Canada on behalf of Nigeria Airways
- IATA flight No.: WT2120
- ICAO flight No.: NGA2120
- Call sign: NIGERIAN 2120
- Registration: C-GMXQ
- Flight origin: King Abdulaziz International Airport, Jeddah, Saudi Arabia
- Destination: Sadiq Abubakar III International Airport, Sokoto, Nigeria
- Occupants: 261
- Passengers: 247
- Crew: 14
- Fatalities: 261
- Survivors: 0

Nigeria Airways Flight 2120 was a chartered passenger flight from Jeddah, Saudi Arabia, to Sokoto, Nigeria. On 11 July 1991, the Douglas DC-8 operating the flight, registered as C-GMXQ and operated by Nationair Canada for Nigeria Airways, caught fire shortly after takeoff from King Abdulaziz International Airport, and crashed while attempting to return for an emergency landing, killing all 247 passengers and 14 crew members on board. The investigation traced the fire to underinflated tyres which overheated and burst during takeoff, and subsequently discovered that a project manager had prevented those tyres from being filled as the aircraft was behind schedule.

Flight 2120 is the deadliest accident involving a DC-8, and the deadliest accident involving a Canadian airline.

== Background ==
=== Aircraft ===
The aircraft involved was a Douglas DC-8-61, registered as C-GMXQ and owned by the Canadian company Nolisair, usually operated by Nationair Canada. The aircraft was manufactured in 1968. At the time of the accident, it was being wet-leased to Nigeria Airways, which had in turn subleased it to Holdtrade Services to transport Nigerian pilgrims to and from Mecca for the Hajj.

=== Crew ===
William Allan, the 47-year-old captain and former Royal Canadian Air Force pilot, had logged 10,700 total flight hours and 1,000 hours in the DC-8. Kent Davidge, the 36-year-old first officer, had logged 8,000 flight hours, of which 550 hours were in the DC-8. Victor Fehr, the 46-year-old flight engineer, had logged 7,500 flight hours, of which 1,000 hours were in the aircraft type.

== Accident ==
The aircraft took off from King Abdulaziz International Airport, bound for Sadiq Abubakar III International Airport in Sokoto, but problems were reported shortly after takeoff. Unbeknownst to the crew, the tyres had caught fire during takeoff, though the fire was not immediately obvious, since the landing gears and wheel wells were not equipped with fire warning systems. Pressurization failed quickly, and the crew received various warnings caused by fire-related failures. In response to the pressurization failure, Captain Allan decided to remain at 600 m (2,000 ft), although the flight was cleared to 900 m (3,000 ft) as a result of the controller mistaking Flight 2120 for a Saudia flight that was also reporting pressurization problems. This mix-up, caused by Captain Allan mistakenly identifying as "Nationair 2120" rather than "Nigerian 2120," lasted for three minutes but was ultimately found not to have had any effect on the outcome.

During this miscommunication with ATC, First Officer Davidge, who was the pilot flying, reported losing hydraulics, prompting the crew to request a return to the airport for an emergency landing. The flight crew only became aware of the fire when in-flight director Kay Smith rushed into the cockpit reporting "smoke in the back ... real bad". Allan informed Smith of the situation on the flight crew's end and, in reply to something not intelligible on the tape, told her "Yeah, just tell [the passengers] we'll be returning to, ah, Jeddah." Shortly afterwards, Davidge reported that he had lost ailerons, forcing Allan to take control; shortly after Allan took over, the cockpit voice recorder failed. At this moment, the air traffic controller realised that Flight 2120 was not following the flight plan and contacted it to tell the crew to return to the plan, only for Allan to respond that he was unable to climb due to flight control problems. Realising his mistake and that Flight 2120 was in trouble, the controller began directing it towards the runway. Allan subsequently contacted air traffic control multiple times, declaring an emergency, reporting flight control difficulties, and telling the controller the plane was on fire.

Conditions in the cabin are not precisely known, but have been deduced by investigators. In-flight Director Smith's report implied that the passengers were being exposed to heavy smoke, that there were injuries among the passengers, and that melted over-wing emergency exits meant that flames had entered the cabin. When the aircraft was about 18 km (11 mi; 10 nmi) from the airport and at an altitude of 670 m (2,200 ft), it began to experience an inflight breakup and the bodies of a number of people on board fell from it, indicating that the fire by that time had consumed, at least partially, the cabin floor. Unlocked doors found in the wreckage suggest that passengers attempted to open the doors in flight, something which would have been impossible due to the speed of the aircraft. As the plane came in to land, Allan communicated to the tower, "Require emergency vehicles immediately, we have a fire. We will be ground evacuating." In his last communication with the tower, he reported that the plane was lining up with the center runway rather than the left, prompting the controller to authorize the use of any runway. Just 2,875 m (9,432 ft) short of the runway, the melting aircraft finally became uncontrollable and crashed, killing all on board who had not already suffocated or fallen out of the aircraft. Nine of the 14 crew were identified, but "no attempt was made to identify the passengers".

As of February 2025, the accident remains the deadliest crash involving a Douglas DC-8, as well as the second-deadliest accident taking place on Saudi Arabian soil, after Saudia Flight 163.

== Cause ==
Prior to departure, the lead mechanic had noticed that the "No. 2 and No. 4 tyre pressures were below the minimum for flight dispatch", and attempted to inflate them, but no nitrogen gas was readily available. The project manager, unwilling to accept a delay, dismissed the problem and readied the aircraft for dispatch. As the aircraft was taxiing, the transfer of the load from the underinflated No. 2 tyre to the No. 1 tyre on the same portside axle resulted "in overdeflection, overheating, and structural weakening of the No. 1 tire". "The No. 1 tire failed very early on the take-off roll," followed almost immediately by the No. 2. The latter stopped rotating "for reasons not established", and the subsequent friction of the wheel assembly with the runway generated sufficient heat to start a self-sustaining fire. Given the catastrophic consequences of taking off with the landing gear in this condition, the plane was retroactively deemed to have been unairworthy.

The crew realised they had a problem, but not the nature or seriousness of it. The aircraft was not equipped with fire or heat sensors in the wheel assembly. The first officer was recorded remarking, "We got a flat tire, you figure?" According to Transportation Safety Board of Canada members interviewed for an episode of Mayday about the accident, standard procedures regarding tyre failure during the takeoff roll on the DC-8 did not include rejecting takeoff for tyre or wheel failures, so the captain proceeded with the takeoff.

After takeoff, the landing gear was retracted into the wheel wells. When this occurred, "burning rubber was brought into close proximity with hydraulic and electrical system components," causing both hydraulic and pressurization systems to fail. When the hydraulic system burned through, flammable hydraulic fluid leaked and ignited with the burning tyre, intensifying the fire. The Transportation Safety Board later concluded, "had the crew left the landing gear extended, the accident might have been averted." Fuel, "probably introduced as a result of 'burn through' of the centre fuel tank", intensified the fire even further, which eventually consumed parts of the cabin floor and weakened the rest of the aft fuselage structure.

The investigation discovered that the mechanics had known about the underinflated tyres since July 7, but that the project manager, lacking the relevant training to make an informed decision, had prevented maintenance on the tyres because the aircraft was behind schedule, requiring them to record false pressure readings in the log to make the aircraft seem airworthy. This meant that Nationair Canada executives had pressured the colleagues of the cockpit crew to withhold information that had serious safety implications.

== Aftermath ==
Soon after the accident, a group of Toronto-based Nationair Canada flight attendants pooled funds to create a memorial plaque, inscribed with the names of the victims. The memorial, complete with a cherry tree planted to commemorate their colleagues who died in Jeddah, was given a permanent home at the head office of the Greater Toronto Airports Authority.

The air crash, combined with Nationair Canada's poor reputation for on-time service and mechanical problems, led to serious problems with public image and reliability among tour operators. These difficulties were compounded when Nationair Canada locked out its unionised flight attendants and proceeded to replace them with strikebreakers on 19 November 1991. The lock-out lasted 15 months, and by the time it ended in early 1993, Nationair Canada was in severe financial trouble. At the time, Nationair Canada owed the Canadian government millions of dollars in unpaid landing fees. Creditors began seizing aircraft and demanded cash up front for services. The company was declared bankrupt in May 1993, owing CDN$75 million.

In 1997, Robert Obadia, owner of Nationair Canada and its parent company Nolisair, pleaded guilty to eight counts of fraud in relation to the company's activities.

== In popular culture ==
An episode of Mayday in 2012, titled "Under Pressure", covered the accident.

== See also ==
- Aviation safety
- List of accidents and incidents involving airliners by location
- List of aircraft accidents and incidents resulting in at least 50 fatalities
