= Nolisair =

Canadian air transport company

Nationair Canada
IATA	ICAO	Call sign
NX	NXA	NATION AIRWAYS
- Founded: 1986
- Ceased operations: 1993
- Operating bases: Montréal–Mirabel; Toronto–Pearson
- Fleet size: 30
- Headquarters: Montréal-Mirabel International Airport; Mirabel, Quebec

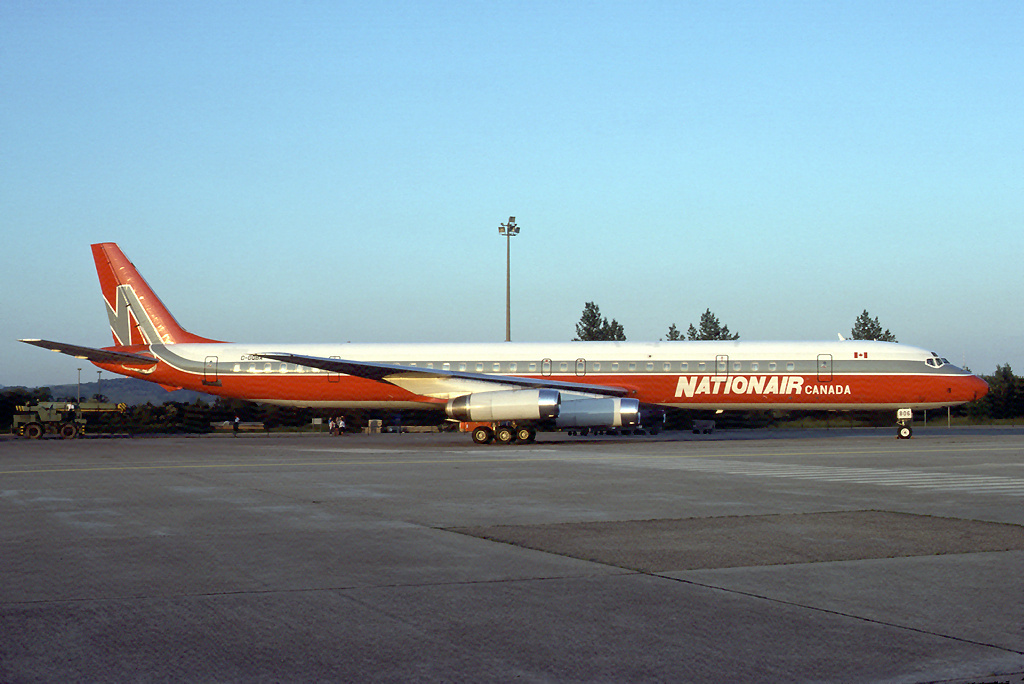
A Nationair Canada Douglas DC-8-63 in 1987 at EuroAirport Basel Mulhouse Freiburg in the old livery.

Nolisair was a Canadian company, the parent company of Nationair Canada, a Canadian airline, and of Technair, an aircraft maintenance company. The company was owned by Robert Obadia. The headquarters were located in the Nationair Canada Building on the property of Montréal-Mirabel International Airport in Mirabel, Quebec.

Nationair was not related to a separate defunct airline based in the U.S. with a similar name, Nations Air, which was not established until after Nationair had ceased operations.

== Nationair Canada ==
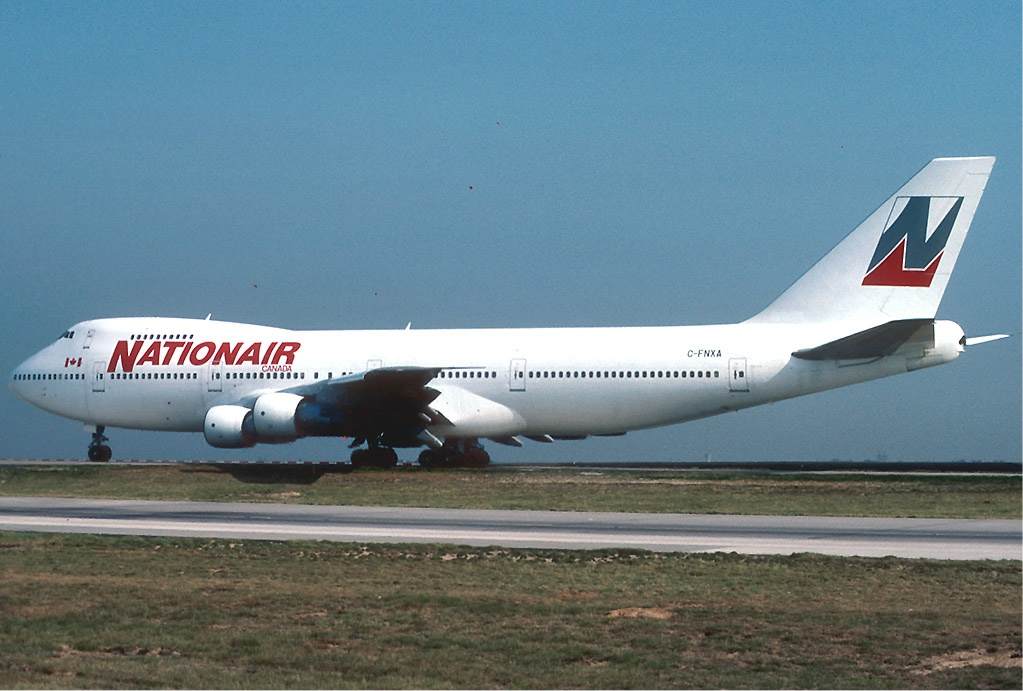
A Nationair Canada Boeing 747-200 at Paris-Charles de Gaulle Airport in April 1990 in the new livery.

Nationair Canada operated charter as well as scheduled passenger services in the late 1980s and early 1990s from bases in Montreal and Toronto, with seasonal bases in Quebec City as well as flights out of Hamilton, Ontario to London, England. At one point, Nationair Canada was Canada's third largest airline, after Air Canada and Canadian Airlines International.

Destinations during the winter months consisted mostly of sunny destinations in Florida, California, the Caribbean, Mexico and South America. Summer destinations included Vancouver and Calgary but had a heavy emphasis on European destinations - mainly England, Scotland, Portugal and France. The airline also had year-round scheduled service between Montreal Mirabel Airport and Brussels, Belgium, serving the route up to daily. In 1988, the airline was operating nonstop service on a scheduled basis between Toronto and London Gatwick Airport. According to the Official Airline Guide (OAG), in 1989 Nationair Canada was operating scheduled nonstop service from Hamilton to London Gatwick as well as nonstop flights from Montreal Mirabel to Brussels with both services being flown with Douglas DC-8 ( stretched "Super DC-8") aircraft.

The airline also tried going head-to-head with Air Canada and Canadian Airlines International operating scheduled flights between Toronto and Montreal, offering low fares and flexible ticketing conditions. However, this scheduled domestic service was fairly short-lived.

During shoulder periods and in order to maximize use of its aircraft, Nationair Canada did a number of sub-contracts. These would sometimes, but not always, include flight attendants as well. This enabled Nationair Canada aircraft to see duty in the Middle East during the run-up to the Gulf War doing evacuations, work for the United Nations moving troops into Namibia as well as flights for Nigerian Airways in 1991, in which one flight ended in disaster.

Nationair Canada also did a number of sub-charters for airlines such as Hispania Líneas Aéreas, British European Airlines, Garuda Indonesia, Union des Transports Aériens (UTA) and LTU International (LTU). Nationair Canada had been operating some flights for UTA in 1989 during the period when UTA Flight 772 was destroyed in-flight.

== Accidents and incidents ==
Nationair Canada operated a number of sub-contracts all over the world, including Nigeria Airways Flight 2120 for Nigeria Airways which crashed at Jeddah, Saudi Arabia on 11 July 1991, killing all 247 passengers and 14 crew members on board. It was and remains the deadliest aviation accident involving a Canadian airline and a McDonnell Douglas DC-8.

The cause of the crash was found to be under-inflated tires, which in turn caused overheated tires to catch fire, and failure of hydraulic systems and the eventual in-flight break-up of the aircraft just short of an emergency landing.

The safety of the airline was often called into question but the president, Robert Obadia, vehemently denied the accusations. Eventually, it would be discovered that the airline often flew aircraft that were unairworthy, and that Transport Canada knew this, but did nothing about it, "losing" a safety review that cast the airline in a negative light. It was later found that the aircraft that crashed in Saudi Arabia had been unairworthy for several days prior to the crash, and that staff had altered documentation in order for the flight to depart on time. In an interview for an episode of Mayday covering the accident, Nolisair executive William Fowler opined that the project managers Nolisair assigned to charter operations, including Flight 2120 victim Aldo Tetamenti, had unintentionally degraded safety culture by placing excessive pressure on maintenance crews.

By the time it was publicly disclosed that the cause of the crash was negligence on the part of the company, the company had already been dissolved for several years.

== Bankruptcy ==
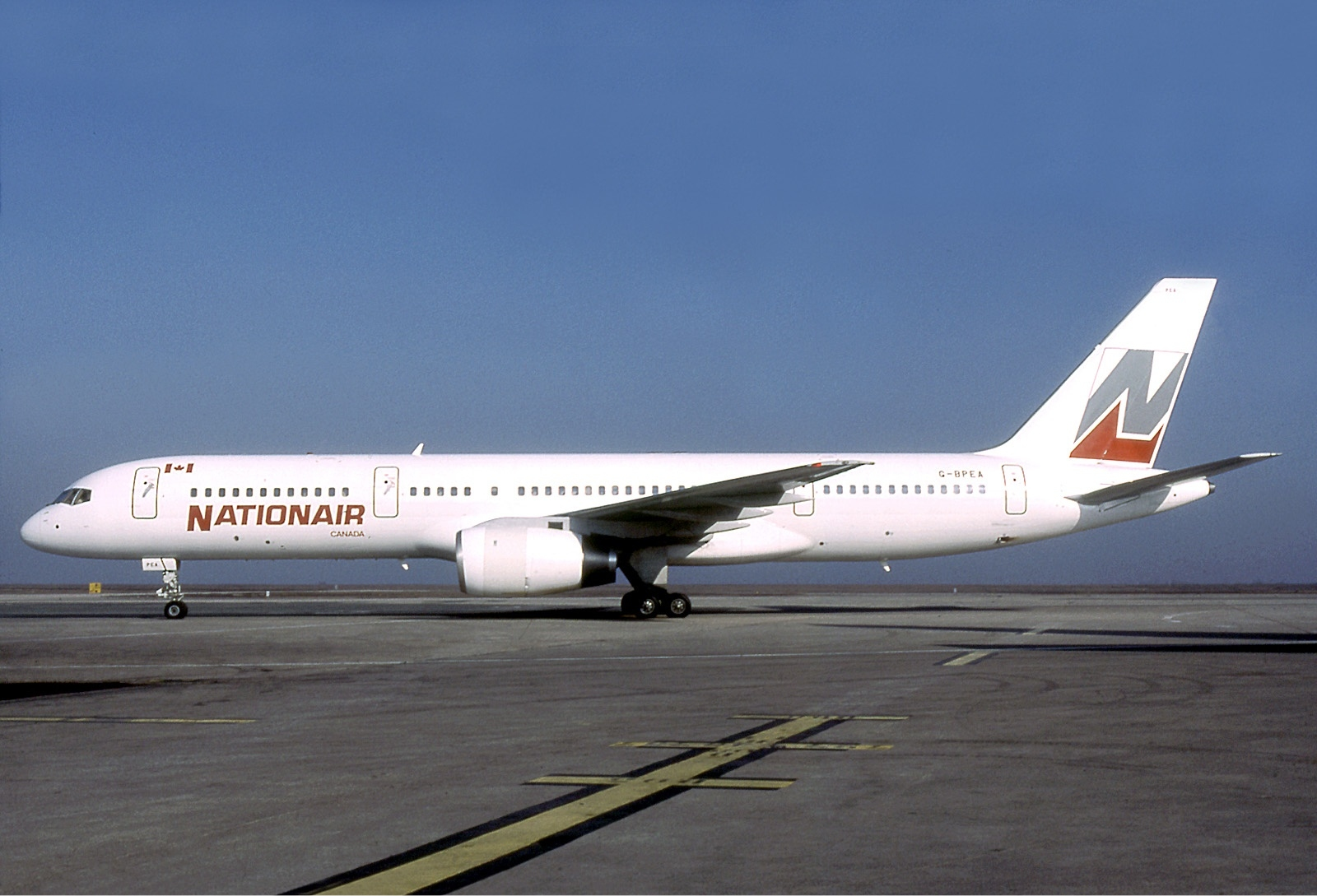
A Nationair Canada Boeing 757-200

The aircrash, combined with Nationair Canada's poor reputation for on-time service and mechanical problems led to serious problems with public image and reliability among tour operators. These difficulties were compounded when Nationair Canada locked out its unionized flight attendants and proceeded to replace them with strikebreakers on November 19, 1991. The lockout lasted 15 months and by the time it ended in early 1993, Nationair Canada was in severe financial trouble, and filed for bankruptcy protection.

The company went bankrupt in the spring of 1993 after it was discovered that it owed the government millions of dollars in unpaid landing fees. Creditors began seizing airplanes and demanded cash up front for services.

The company was declared bankrupt in May 1993, owing CAD$75 million. In 1997 Robert Obadia pleaded guilty to eight counts of fraud in relation to the company's activities.

== See also ==
- List of Canadian disasters by death toll
- Douglas DC-8
- List of defunct airlines of Canada

== Fleet ==
Aircraft	No.	Notes
Douglas DC-8-50CF	1	Sole aircraft used as a freighter for the airline.
Douglas DC-8-60	10	C-GMXQ, DC-8-61, was written off as Flight 2120 while operating for Nigeria Airways. N22UA and N23UA were leased from United Aviation Services
Boeing 747-100	5	
Boeing 747-200	4	N303TW and N304TW were leased from Trans World Airlines
Boeing 757-200	10	
Total:	30	

== Incidents and accidents ==
In July 1991, a wet-leased Nationair Canada Douglas DC-8 operating as Nigeria Airways Flight 2120 caught fire shortly after takeoff and crashed just seconds short of an emergency landing, killing all 261 on board. During the investigation, investigators discovered that the project manager for that flight had pressured the Technair crew into releasing the aircraft with underinflated tyres. Two tyres on the left bogie lost structural integrity due to heat build-up and ended up failing during the takeoff roll, leading to the tyre remnants bursting into flames and compromising the aircraft when the landing gear was retracted. The accident exposed several operating problems with the airline and was a major contributing factor to the company's collapse in 1993.
