= Ryan International Airlines =

US charter, cargo and contract airline (1973–2013)

Ryan International Airlines; PHH Air; Ryan Aviation; DeBoer Aviation
IATA	ICAO	Call sign
RD	RYN	RYAN INTERNATIONAL
- Founded: June 7, 1973 incorporated in Kansas as DeBoer Aviation; January 17, 1977 as Ryan Aviation; January 20, 1988 as PHH Air; May 5, 1989 as Ryan International Airlines
- Ceased operations: January 11, 2013
- Fleet size: See Fleet
- Parent company: PHH Group (1986–1989); Rubloff Development Group (2004–2013)
- Key people: George Ablah
- Founders: Ronald D. Ryan; Jack P. DeBoer

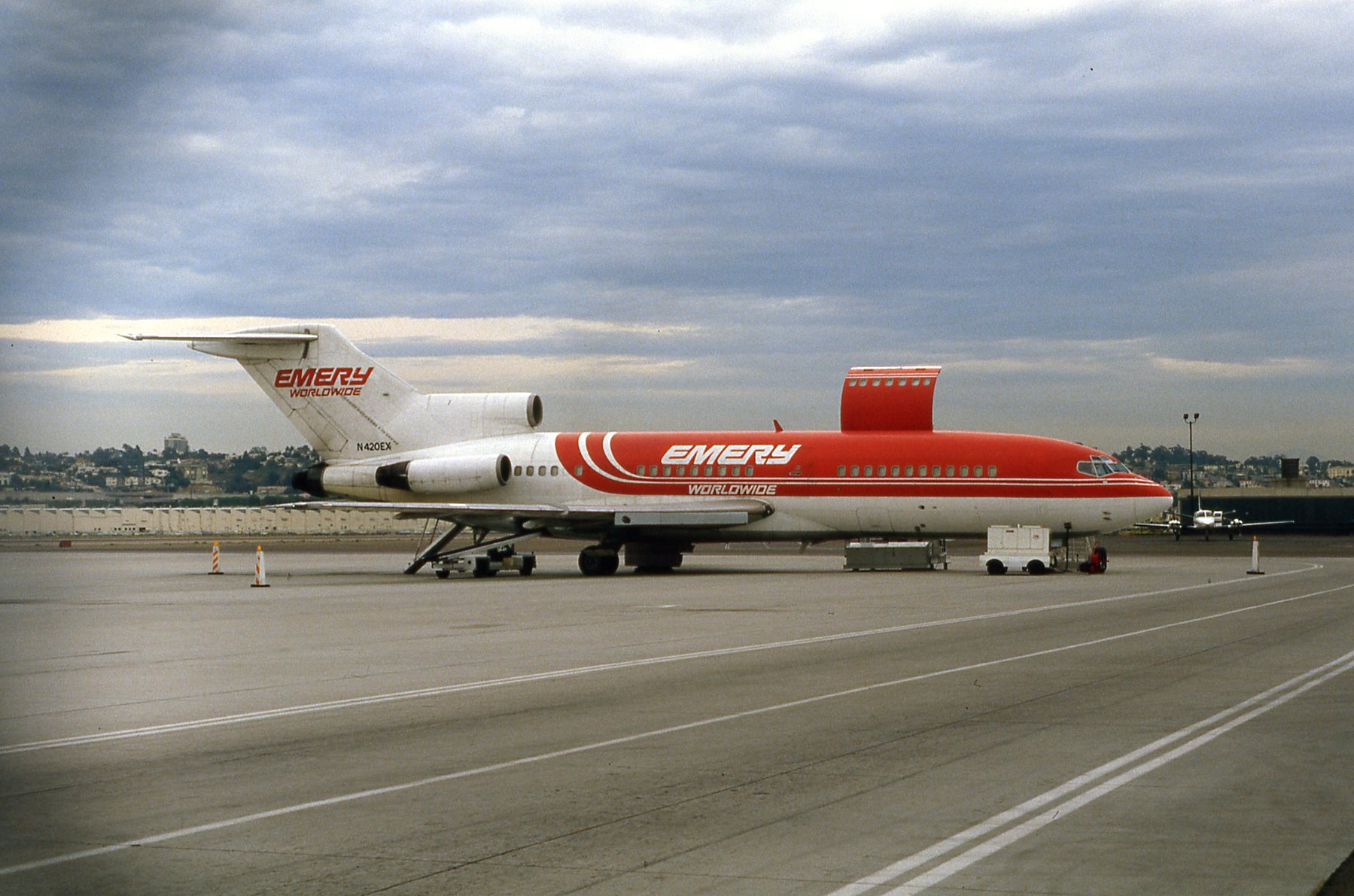
Flying 727-100 N420EX for Emery 1985 San Diego

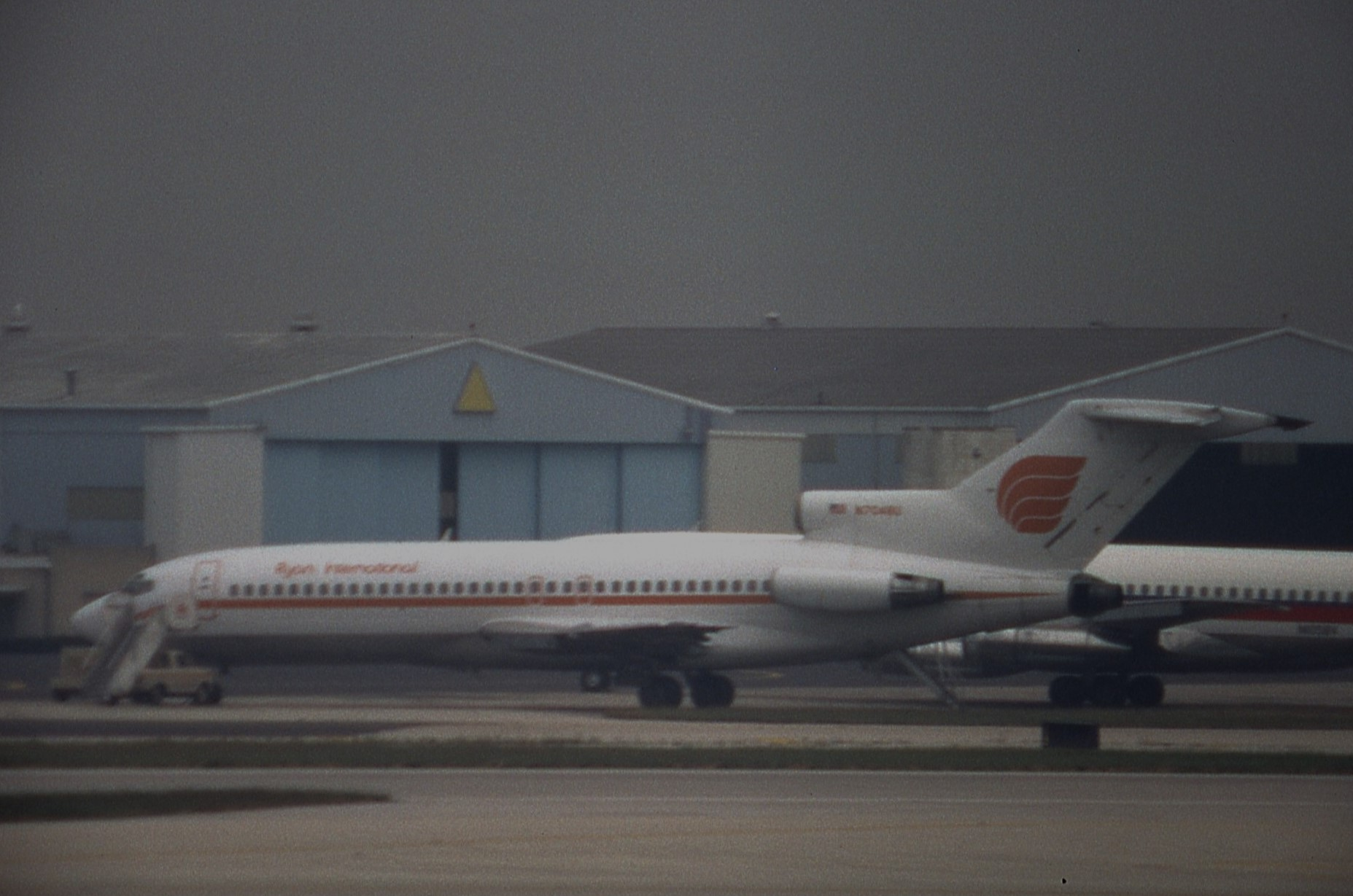
Passenger charter Boeing 727 September 1984 Philadelphia

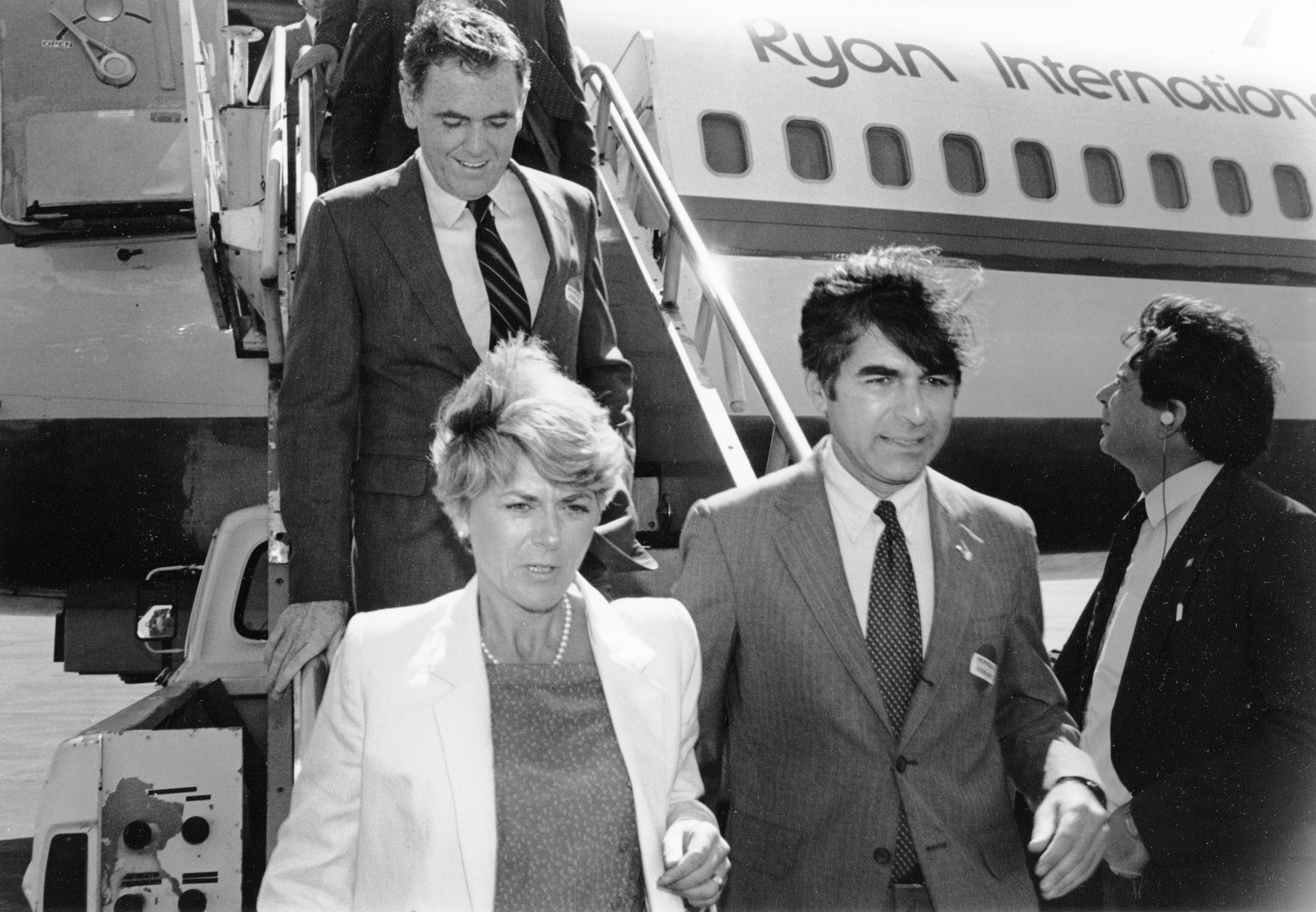
Charter customers Vice Presidential candidate Geraldine Ferraro with Boston Mayor Raymond Flynn and Massachusetts Governor Michael Dukakis 1984

Ryan International Airlines (RYN) was an American contract, cargo and charter airline that at one time had a fleet of over 40 commercial jet aircraft. The company originated as a modest 1973 spin-off of a single Learjet (as DeBoer Aviation) from the business activities of Wichita entrepreneur Jack P. DeBoer under the leadership of DeBoer's former corporate pilot, Ronald D. Ryan. In 1977, after a change of ownership, the business was renamed Ryan Aviation and started flying Cessna Citations for Emery Air Freight later that year, upgrading to Boeing 727s in late 1981. The airline was sold to PHH Group in 1986 and briefly named PHH Air in 1988–1989, but after losing all its business, PHH sold the moribund airline back to Ryan in 1989, who quickly resuscitated it as Ryan International Airlines, again flying for Emery, this time subcontracting for a United States Postal Service (USPS) contract. The USPS subcontract came to an end in 2001, significantly reducing the size of RYN. In this period, Ryan generally sought to take no asset risk, operating aircraft controlled by others.

In 2004, Ryan sold the business to Rubloff Development Group, which moved the airline to Rockford, Illinois in 2006, continuing to operate it as a conventional charter airline, mostly focused on military and other US government charters, until its 2013 demise.

== History ==
=== Startup ===
Ronald D. Ryan was a former Western Electric tool and die maker turned corporate pilot who came to Wichita, Kansas in 1968 to work for entrepreneur Jack P. DeBoer. In 1971–1972, DeBoer had financial troubles, leading him to spin off his corporate aviation department (as DeBoer Aviation) to his wife with Ryan as a minority shareholder, incorporated 6 July 1973, initially offering charters with a single Learjet 24B. Continued DeBoer liquidity needs resulted in real estate developer George Ablah taking part of the DeBoer stake. In 1976, disagreements between the shareholders were resolved by the DeBoers selling out to Ryan and Ablah, with the company renamed Ryan Aviation (RYN), official as of 17 January 1977. RYN started flying for Emery Air Freight later in 1977 with a Cessna Citation. In 1979, RYN started flying a small fleet of Citations in support of an Emery hub in Smyrna, Tennessee. In 1980, the Civil Aeronautics Board provided Ryan Aviation with economic certification as a cargo airline for the purpose of flying under contract to Emery Air Freight. In November 1981, RYN upgraded to Boeing 727s for Emery in conjunction with Emery consolidating Smyrna hub operations with those at Dayton, Ohio. By December 1982, RYN was flying eight 727s for Emery.

=== Passenger service, UPS, PHH Air ===
In December 1983, RYN started east-coast passenger charters, doing business as Ryan International Airlines, with two 727-100s, adding a 727-200 in January 1985. However, RYN exited the passenger business by 1986, selling the related aircraft. Also in 1985, United Parcel Service (UPS) selected Ryan to fly eight 727-200 freighters. In 1986, UPS designated Ryan to fly its new Boeing 757s when delivered. RYN would ultimately fly five 757s for UPS. However, in July 1986, RYN was sold to PHH Group for $17 million (about $50 million in 2026 terms) to accommodate George Ablah, who wished to exit his investment. RYN had 16 727s, 300 employees and $30 million in annual revenue at the time. On 20 January 1988, Ryan Aviation was officially renamed to PHH Air.

=== Zero to 42 aircraft ===
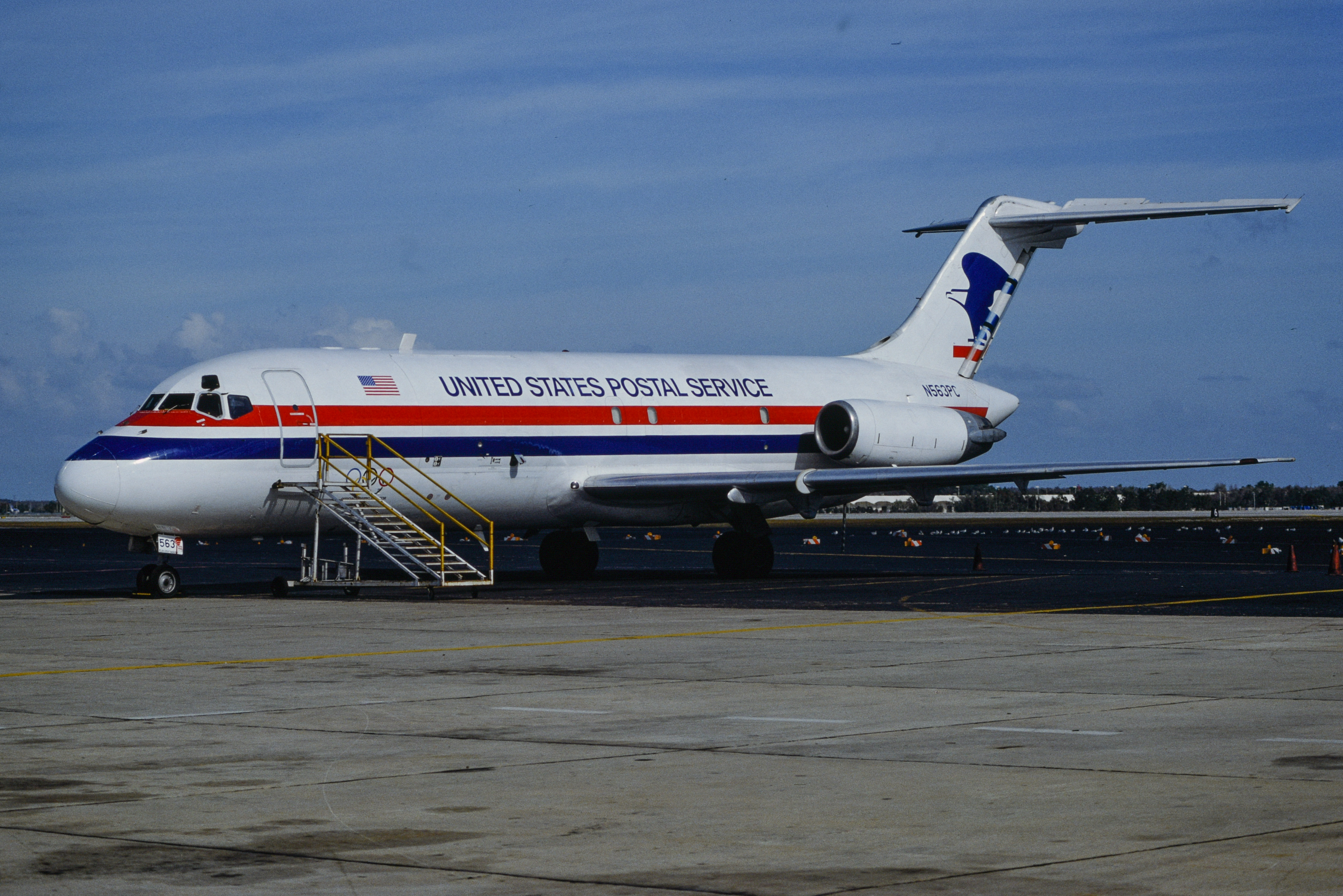
Operating DC-9 for the United States Postal Service, Orlando 1990

However, PHH lost the entire business over the next few years. In August 1987, UPS announced it would insource its flying, which was wrapped up by the end of 1988. PHH also lost the Emery business in June 1988, leaving the airline essentially moribund by the end of 1988. Ryan bought the business back in stages, paying about $2 million in total (financed by industrial revenue bonds of the Wichita airport), first the Wichita business jet business in July 1988, then the remains of the airline in February 1989, legally named Ryan International Airlines as of 5 May 1989, and had to reapply for its Federal Aviation Administration (FAA) certification. Resumption of operation occurred in conjunction with a subcontract with Consolidated Freightways (CF) subsidiary Air Train to fly for the United States Postal Service (USPS) starting August 1989. The subcontract, initially to fly eight Douglas DC-9s from CF's new postal hub in Indianapolis, increased at short notice to add nine 727s when Air Train was unable to handle them itself. CF renamed Air Train to Emery Worldwide Airlines (EWA) later that year.

In October the parent of another Emery/CF contractor, Orion Air, announced it was getting out of aviation. Ryan originally passed on the opportunity to also pick up Orion's assets, but changed his mind when the price came down, and on 2 January 1990 RYN started flying a further 25 727s previously operated by Orion, for which RYN paid only a $3.5 million note, guaranteed by Emery. RYN thus went from moribund to operating 42 aircraft within less than six months.

=== Passengers and fish ===
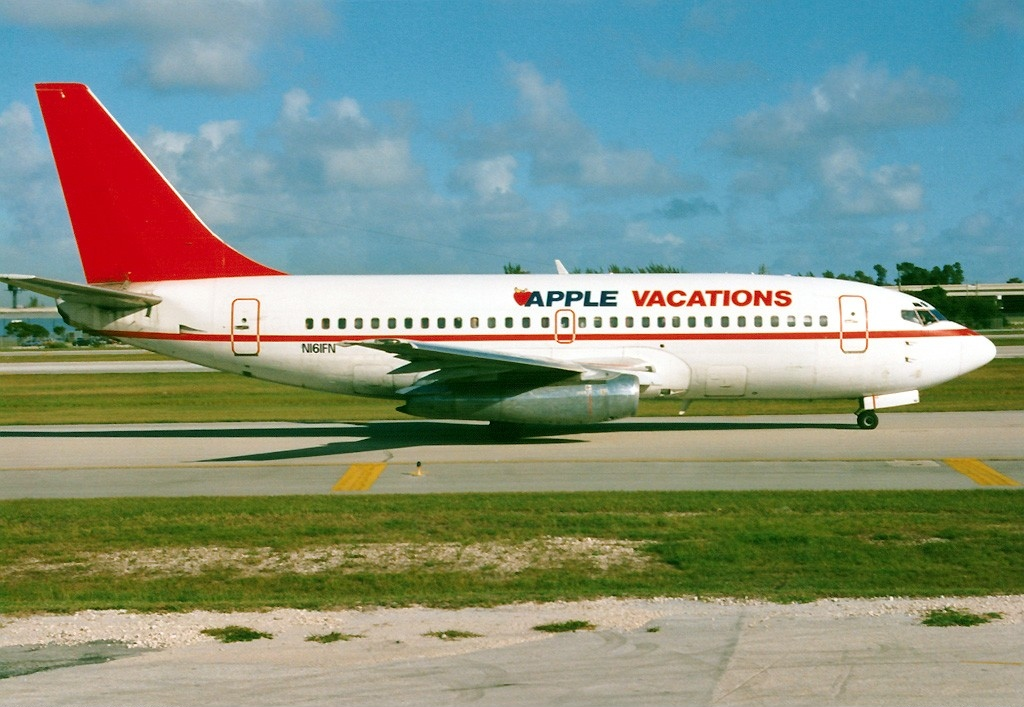
Operating 737-200 for Apple Vacations Fort Lauderdale 1994

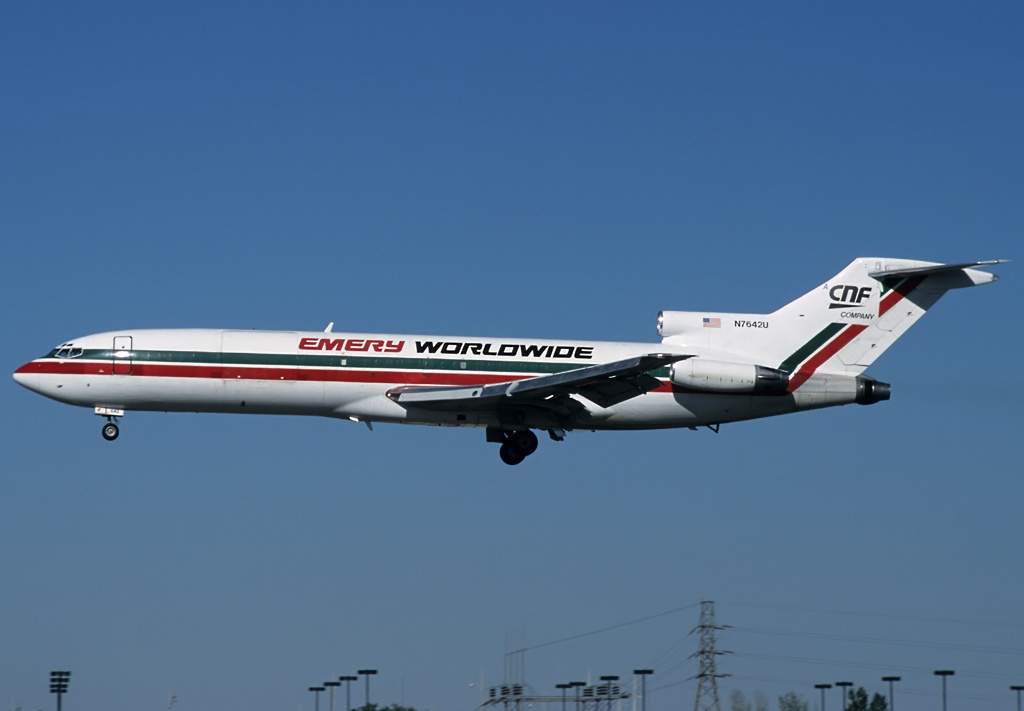
Operating 727-200F for Emery, Minneapolis 2000

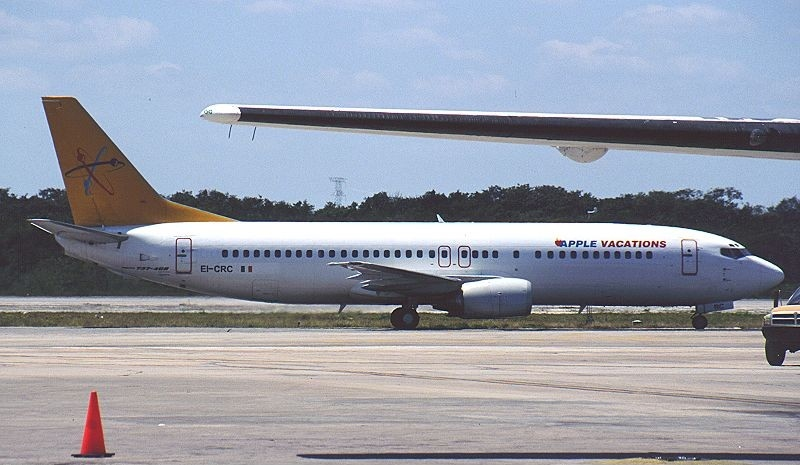
Operating 737-400 for Apple Vacations Cancún 2000. Note non-US registration

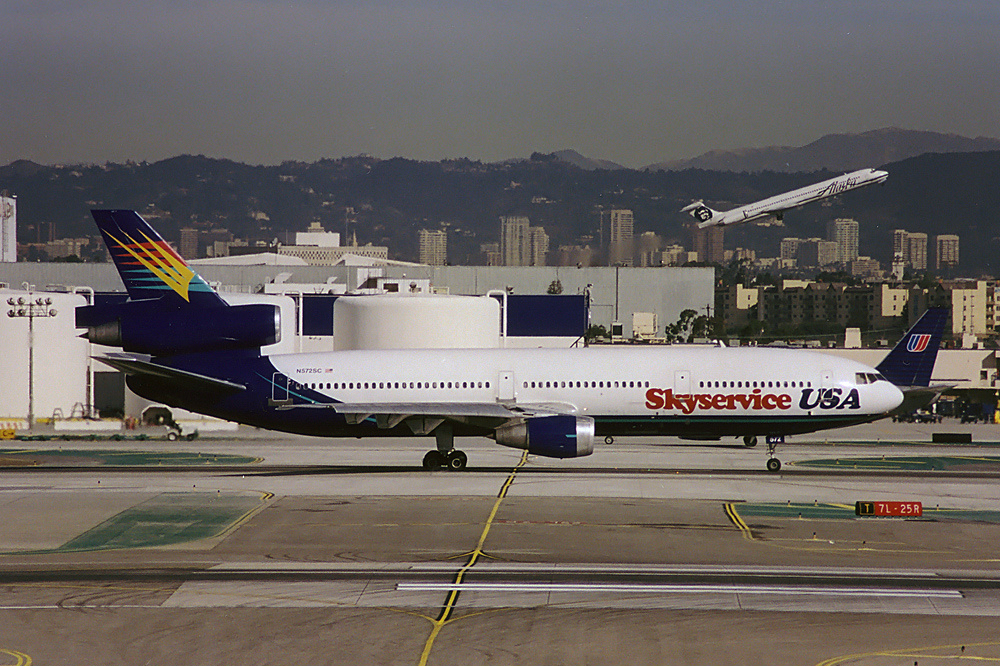
Operating DC-10-10 for Skyservice USA, 2000

As well as the Emery/USPS business, RYN of this era flew a wide variety of other smaller programs, including passenger service. For instance, from June 1992 to January 1993, RYN flew scheduled passenger service with 737-300s for Morris Air from Salt Lake City. In the winter of 1993–1994, RYN flew 737-200s for Apple Vacations (see photo). Programs included activities as diverse as transporting fish in Micronesia and flying passengers to Hawaii in McDonnell Douglas DC-10s (see photo). Another scheduled program was operating Airbus A320s for AirTran in the early 2000s (see photo) to fly long-haul routes AirTran's Boeing 717 fleet could not reach. What all of these had in common was that RYN did not take asset risk; RYN flew aircraft provided by others.

=== End of USPS and Emery ===
In February 2000, EWA suffered the fatal crash of a Douglas DC-8 near Sacramento. Subsequent National Transportation Safety Board (NTSB) and FAA investigations revealed wide-ranging safety violations and in August 2001, the airline agreed to "voluntarily" suspend operations. In December, EWA's parent company, now called CNF Transportation, decided to ground EWA permanently. In the same timeframe, USPS cancelled its contracts with EWA (for which RYN subcontracted) in favor of a new contract with Federal Express. CNF used RYN to backfill for EWA in its own freight business, a silver lining for RYN relative to the substantial loss of business represented by the lost USPS contract. But the net result was still significantly negative. By early 2002, RYN was flying 15 aircraft for CNF, down from 30 a year earlier. These events occurred against a backdrop of extremely poor conditions for airlines generally but particularly for contract airlines and 727 freight operators. The USPS business (previously the largest source of demand for contract carriers) was now held by Federal Express, signs of distress included: Kitty Hawk and Fine Air were bankrupt and had reduced operations, Express One had grounded almost its entire fleet of 20 Boeing 727 freighters and BAX Global had reduced capacity by a half.

=== Rubloff Development Group ===
Between June and August 2004, Ronald D. Ryan completed the sale of almost all of RYN to Rockford, Illinois-based Rubloff Development Group (RDG). Ryan noted he was 65 years old and wanted to take time to "smell the roses." He also said that RDG planned to take asset risk (own or lease their own aircraft), which he had avoided "like the plague." Timing was fortuitous, as CNF sold off the remains of the former Emery business to UPS later that year. The new RDG-owned RYN offered its own scheduled service from Rockford to Cancún in early 2005 as SunShip 1 Airlines (see photo). SunShip 1 did not last beyond 2005, however.

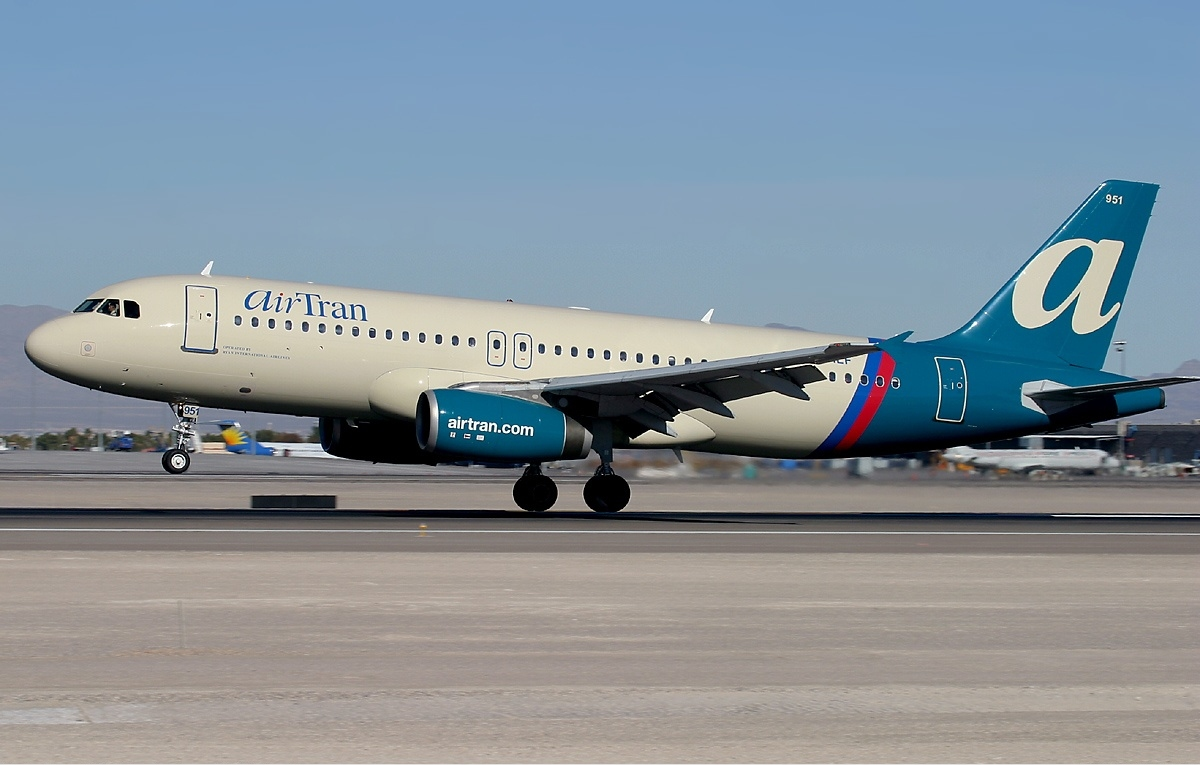
Operating an A320 for AirTran in 2003 at Las Vegas

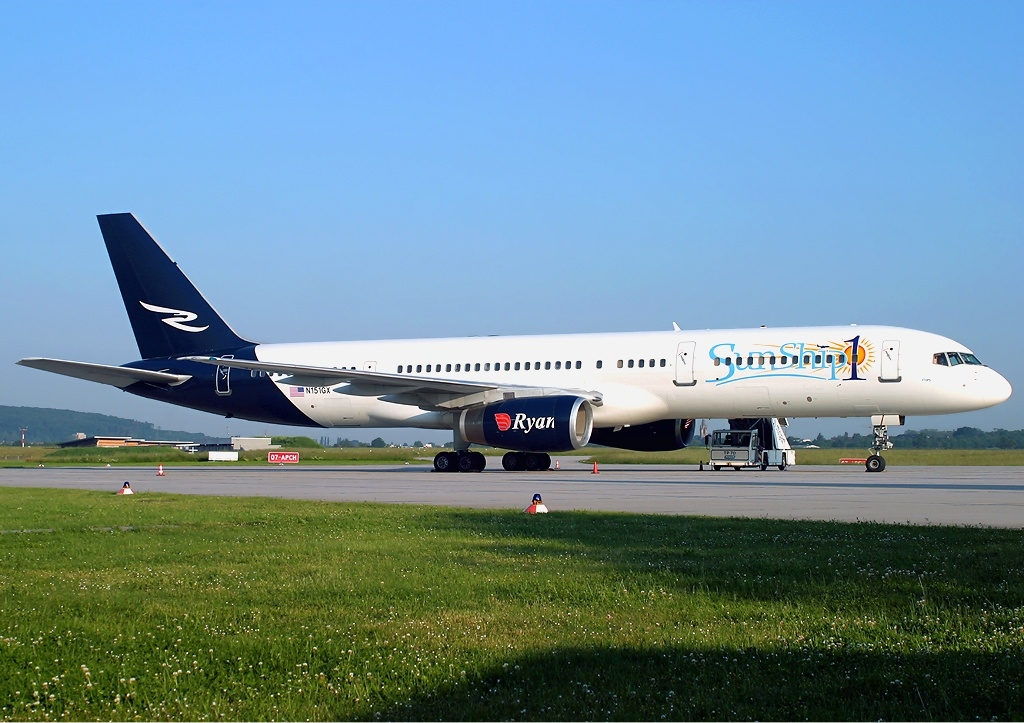
Boeing 757 in 2005. "SunShip 1 Airlines" was a Rubloff-era in-house virtual airline

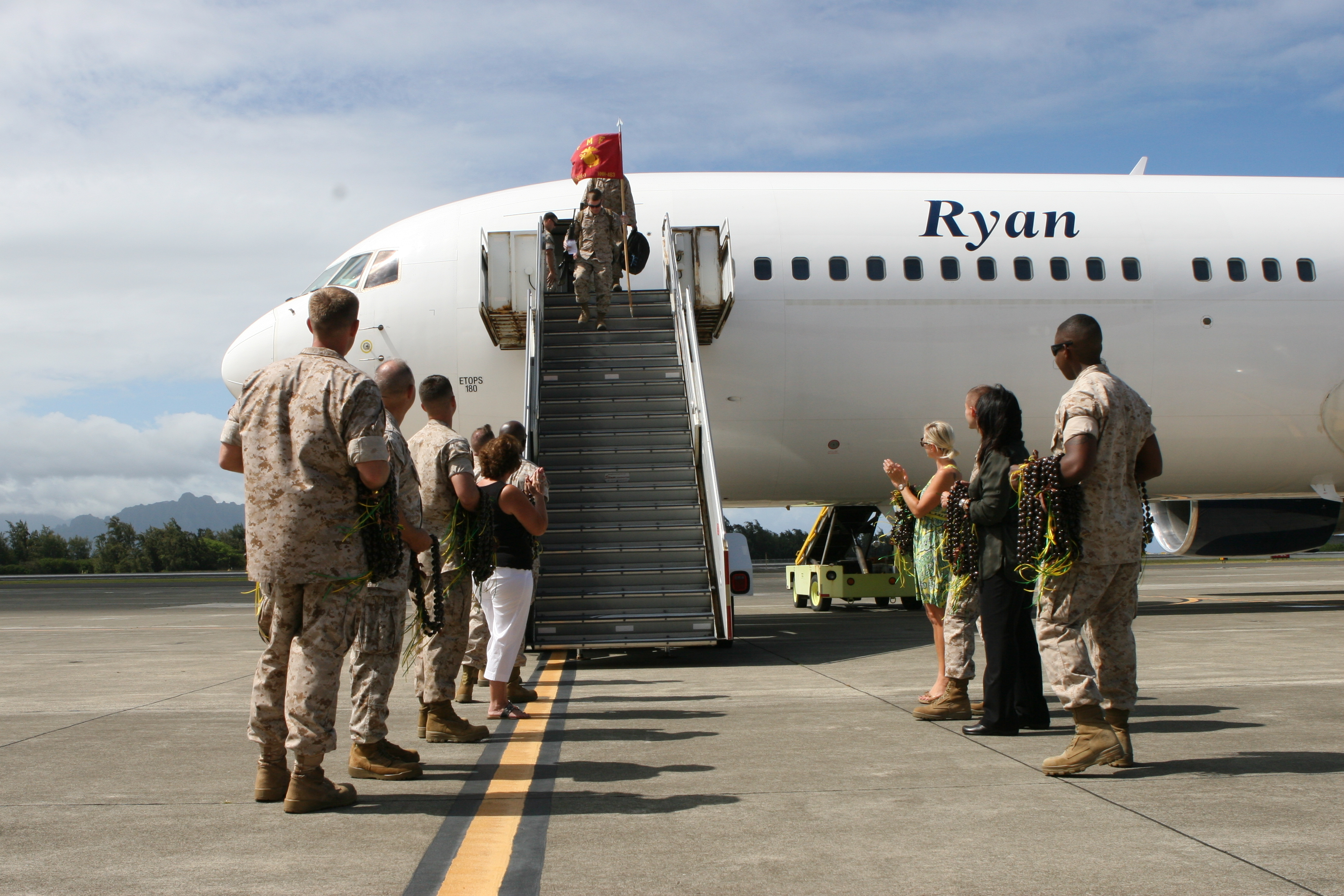
767 returning Marines from Afghanistan, MCAS Kaneohe Bay September 2011

RDG-era RYN relied heavily on military and government charters. The drawdown of the US from the Iraq war resulted in substantial reduction in demand for military charters. RYN was one of many similar airlines affected. For instance, the largest military contract airline of the era, Global Aviation Holdings, parent of North American Airlines and World Airways, declared bankruptcy in February 2012, citing the drawdown, turning back 16 (of 30) aircraft to creditors and lessors, and Evergreen International Airlines liquidated at the end of 2013, with the reduction of military business cited as a reason. Remaining military demand prioritized large long-range aircraft. A contract to acquire a Boeing 777 fell through and while RYN was able to source an A330 to replace it, it took longer than expected to make the aircraft operational. On March 6, 2012, Ryan filed for Chapter 11 bankruptcy, citing "unexpected and dramatic reductions in military flying." Creditors were able to install a third-party CEO in restructuring to isolate RYN from RDG's problems, which was also having trouble. However, the airline was unable to transition to other business and entered liquidation 11 January 2013.

== Fleet ==
31 March 1981 AvData showed Ryan Aviation with:

- 9 Cessna 500 Citation I
- 2 Gates Learjet 25B
- 1 Gates Learjet 35

1987-88 World Airline Fleets (copyright 1987) shows Ryan Aviation (dba Ryan International Airlines) with (client shown in parentheses):

- 8 Boeing 727-100C (Emery Worldwide)
- 1 Cessna 550 Citation II

While not reflected in the World Airline Fleets listing, RYN was also flying eight Boeing 727-200Fs for United Parcel Service (UPS). The airline would also fly five Boeing 757s for UPS.

Ryan International operated a diverse fleet of jetliners during its existence including the following aircraft:

- Airbus A320
- Airbus A321
- Airbus A330-200
- Airbus A330-300
- Boeing 727-100
- Boeing 727-200
- Boeing 737-200
- Boeing 737-300
- Boeing 737-400
- Boeing 737-500
- Boeing 737-800
- Boeing 757-200
- Boeing 767-300
- McDonnell Douglas DC-9-10, including N565PC
- McDonnell Douglas DC-10-10
- McDonnell Douglas MD-82
- McDonnell Douglas MD-83
- McDonnell Douglas MD-87

== Accidents ==
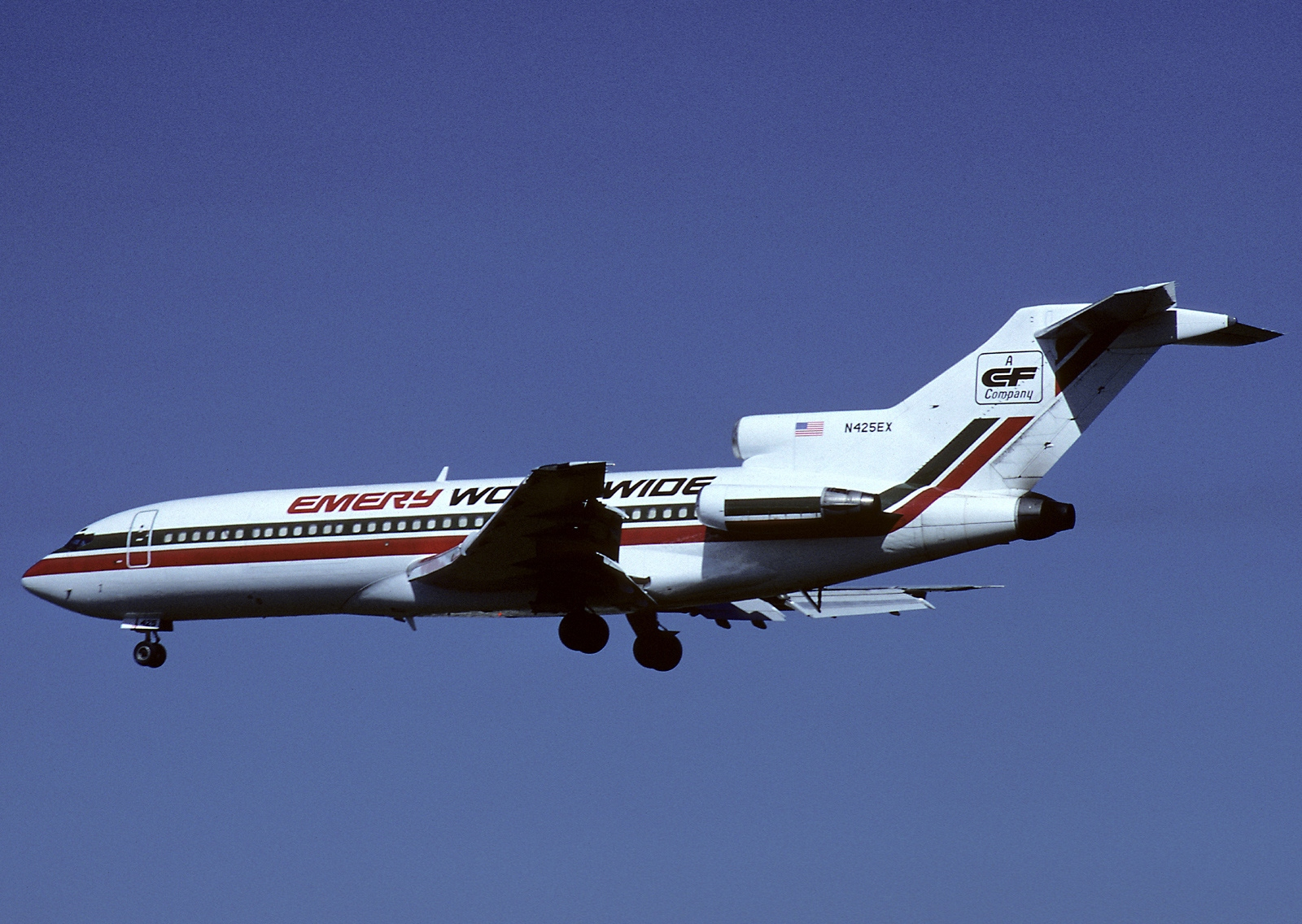
N425EX, the 727 destroyed in May 1991 in Windsor Locks, Connecticut

- 17 February 1991 – Douglas DC-9-15 N565PC performing Flight 590 from Cleveland to Indianapolis, flying mail under subcontract to Emery Worldwide Airlines, crashed after takeoff. Both pilots, the only occupants, died. Probable cause was icing, with Ryan, the FAA and McDonnell Douglas cited for not properly emphasizing a known icing issue with the DC-9-10 series.
- 3 May 1991 – An uncontained engine failure during takeoff caused a fire on Boeing 727-100QC N425EX on a flight from Bradley International Airport in Windsor Locks, Connecticut to Boston carrying mail on behalf of Emery Worldwide Airlines. The crew survived with minor injuries. While firefighters prevented fuel tanks from igniting, the cargo of priority mail repeatedly ignited, with the aircraft a write-off.
- 1 October 1997 – A shuttle bus failed to give way to Boeing 727-51C N414EX, operating as Flight 607, at Denver and caused substantial to the cockpit. All three crew members survived, but the captain and first officer were injured, the captain severely. The aircraft was a writeoff.

== See also ==
- List of defunct airlines of the United States
- Emery Worldwide Airlines
- Emery Worldwide
- Consolidated Freightways
- CNF Transportation
- UPS Airlines
