= Rosenbalm Aviation =

US contract freight airline (1960–1991)

Flagship Express Services Rosenbalm Aviation
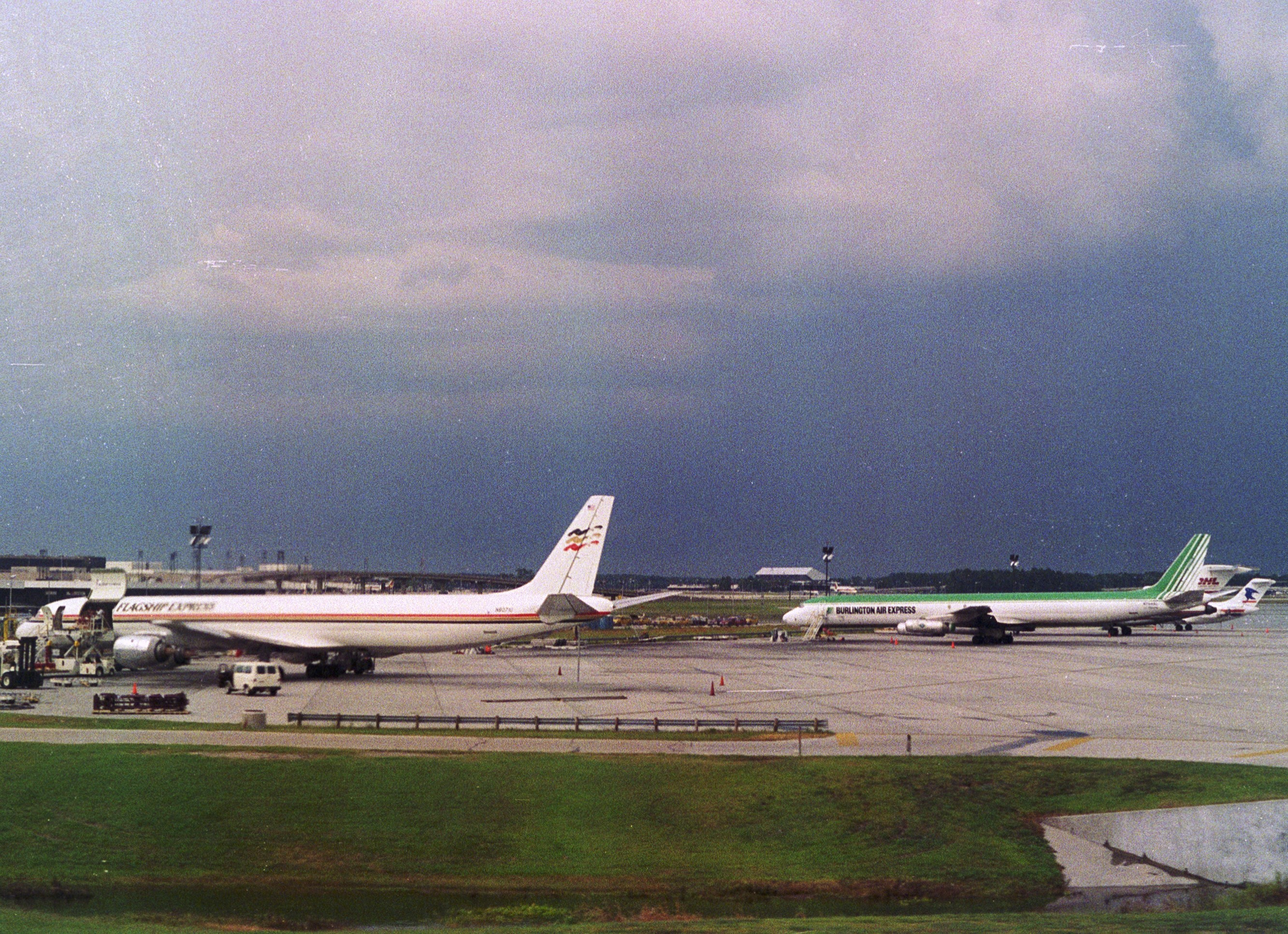
- Flagship Express DC-8-71F Houston July 1991
IATA	ICAO	Call sign
9R	FSX; RAX	FLAG; ROSIE
- Founded: 1960
- Commenced operations: November 1973 as an uncertificated carrier
- Ceased operations: December 2, 1991
- Operating bases: Ypsilanti, Michigan
- Fleet size: See Fleet
- Parent company: Flagship Express (1989–1991)
- Headquarters: Bannockburn, Illinois; Ypsilanti, Michigan; Medford, Oregon
- Key people: Eli Jacobs
- Founder: William E. "Bill" Rosenbalm, Jr.

Rosenbalm Aviation (Rosenbalm) flew cargo in the 1980s for freight and package express companies like Emery Worldwide, Burlington Air Express and CF Airfreight, with a fleet of ultimately over 25 Douglas DC-8s. The company started in Oregon in 1960 crop dusting and flying for the United States Forest Service (USFS), including performing aircraft modifications necessary to support USFS activities. In late 1973, Rosenbalm bought the Michigan-based auto parts transportation business from Intermountain Aviation, an airline then secretly owned by the Central Intelligence Agency (CIA). Rosenbalm also had a business converting DC-8s to carry cargo. In the 1980s, the company's business transitioned to flying freight for airfreight/package express companies.

The airline changed hands in 1987 and again in 1989, the latter of these to financier Eli Jacobs, then-owner of the Baltimore Orioles major league baseball team. The airline was briefly known as Flagship Express Services (FSX) and flew scheduled freight service under that brand before it abruptly ceased service in December 1991 about two months after losing its Emery contract. Creditors forced FSX into bankruptcy and it left large debts unpaid, including wages.

== History ==
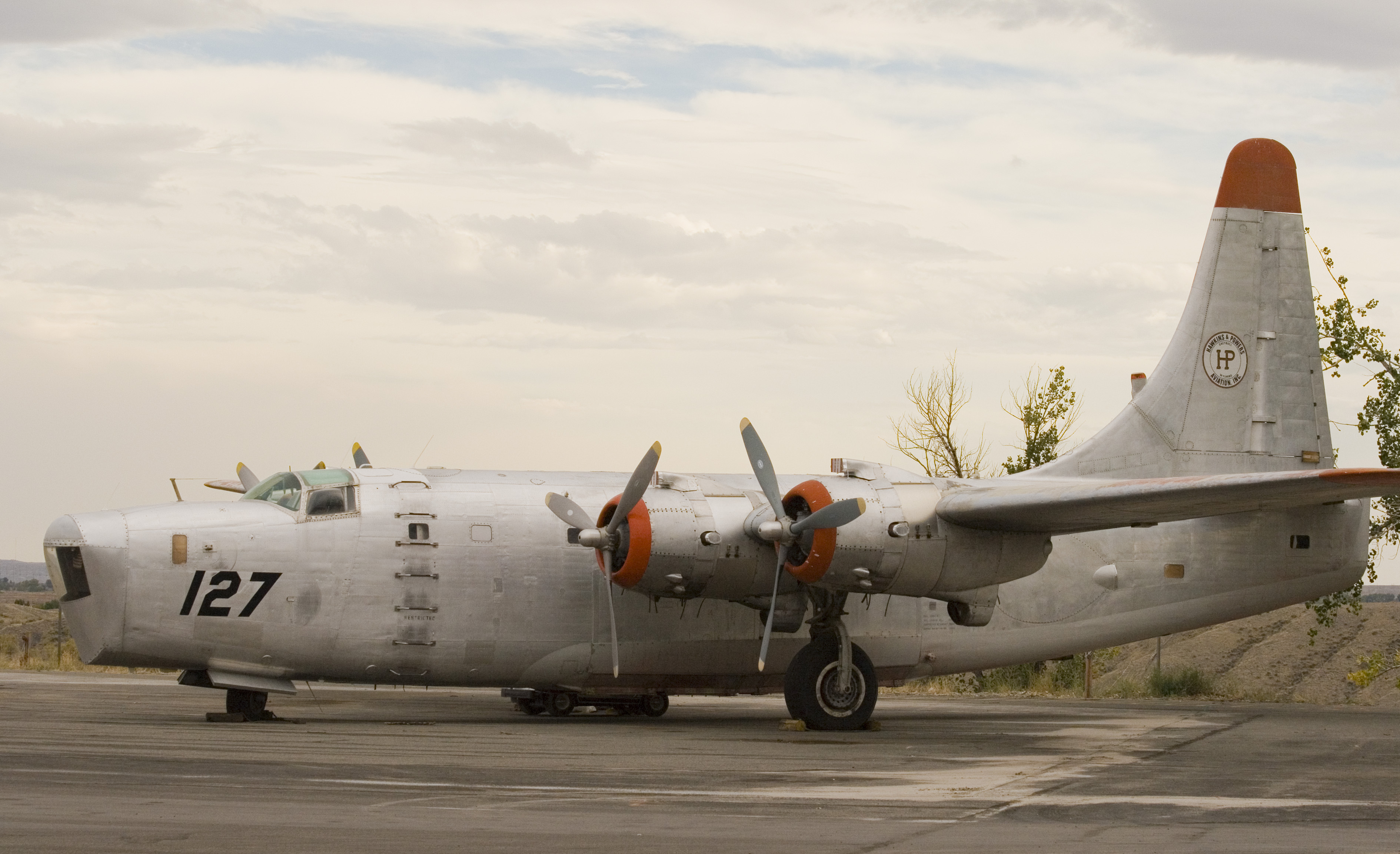
In the 1960s Rosenbalm operated this Consolidated PB4Y-2 (N6884C serial 59701, shown here in 2007)

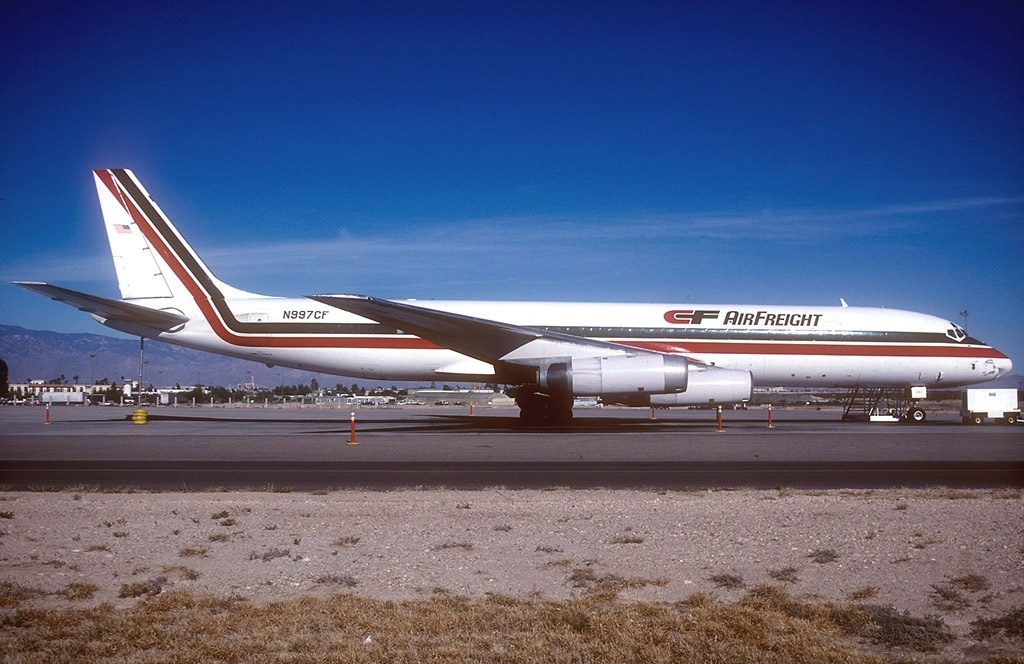
Operating for CF Airfreight DC-8-62F Tucson 1989

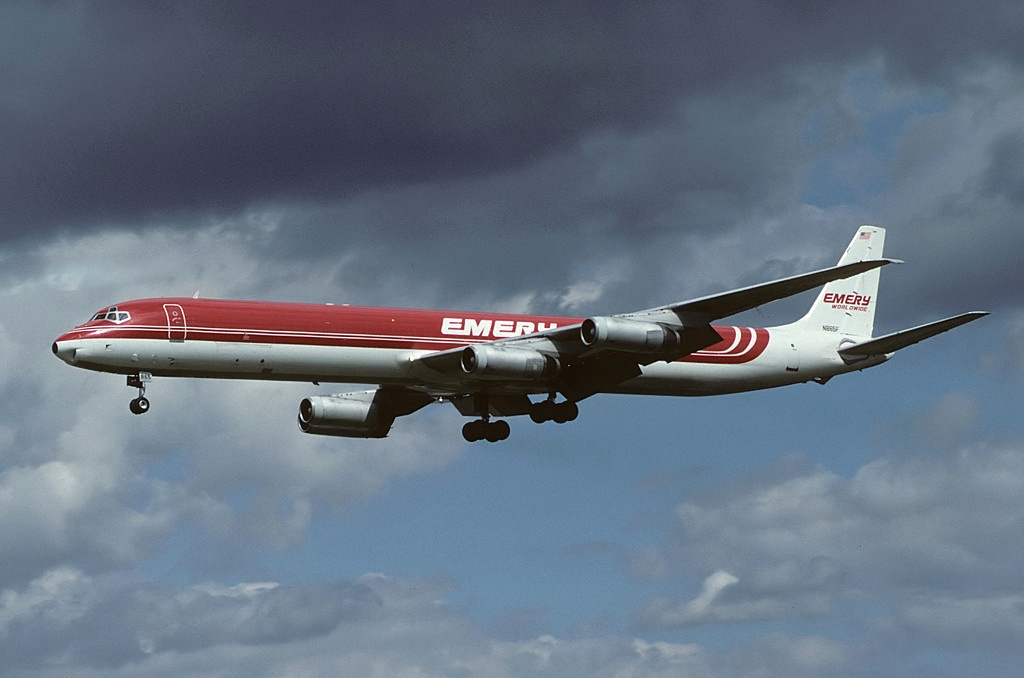
Operating for Emery DC-8-63F RAF Mildenhall 1985

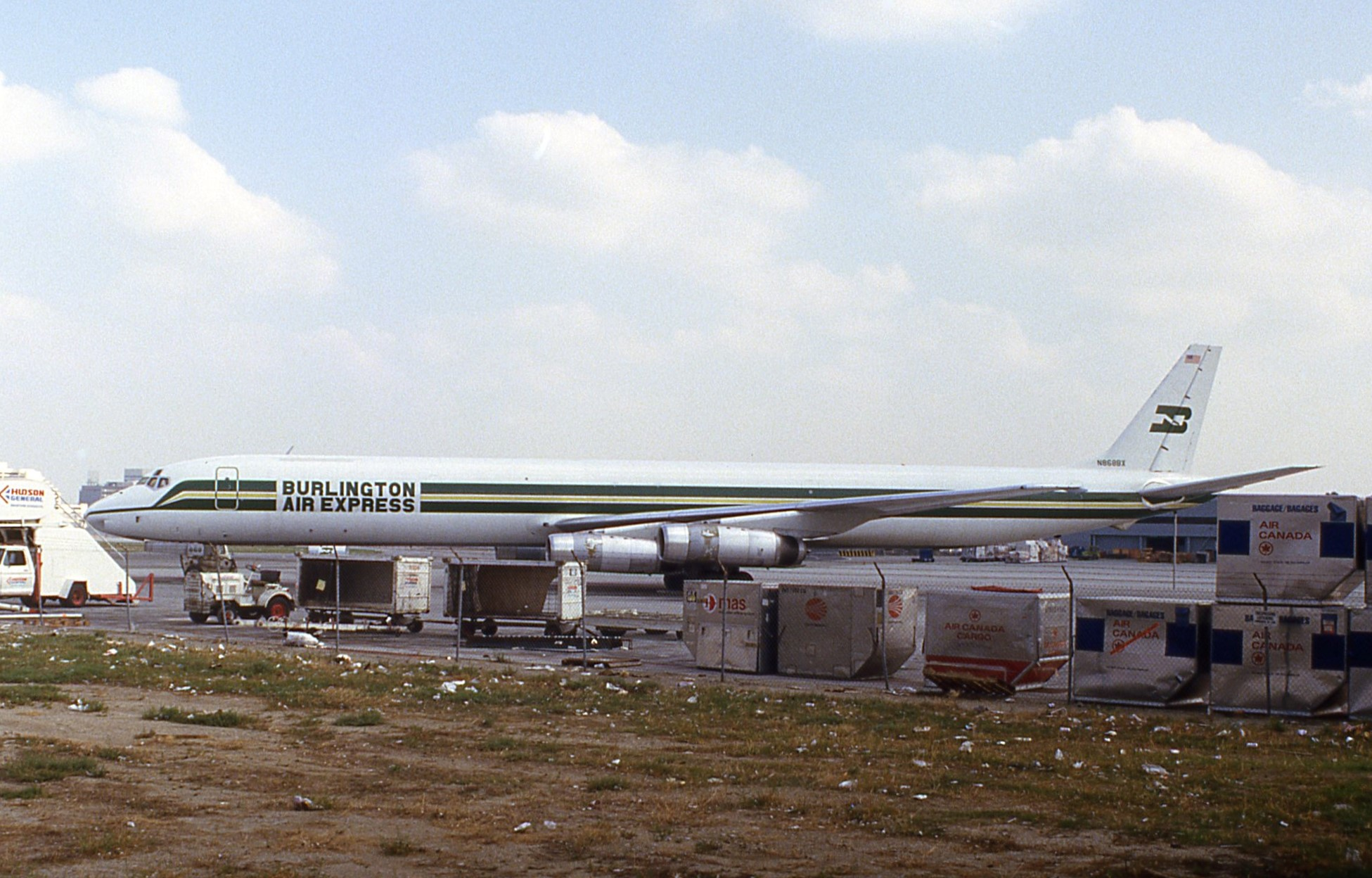
Operating for Burlington DC-8-63F Los Angeles 1986

=== Fire fighting ===
In 1960, pilot William E. "Bill" Rosenbalm, Jr., incorporated Rosenbalm Aviation in Medford, Oregon, to crop dust and bid on United States Forest Service (USFS) business such as spraying pesticides, seeding land and fighting fires. In 1961, Rosenbalm bought and converted five B-26s, two PB4Y-2s and a PV-2 to drop fire retardant. The company, which won fire-fighting contracts nationwide, also flew the Kaman H-43A helicopter. In 1973 , Rosenbalm became a Part 121 commercial operator, otherwise known as an uncertificated carrier—authorized to fly large commercial aircraft by the Federal Aviation Administration (FAA) but only on a contract basis, not as a common carrier.

=== Auto parts ===
In November 1973, Rosenbalm bought the Willow Run Airport (Ypsilanti, Michigan), business of Intermountain Aviation, flying auto parts for the Big Three automakers, including four Curtiss C-46s. Rosenbalm's financials were poor but significantly improved after the purchase. In 1988, Bill Rosenbalm refused to discuss how he had afforded the acquisition. In 1974, Intermountain was revealed to be owned by the Central Intelligence Agency (CIA). Rosenbalm would later "piggyback" on the airline certificate of Evergreen International Airlines (EIA), paying a commission to operate aircraft as a common carrier under EIA's authority. Evergreen had similar origins to Rosenbalm, i.e., it was Oregon-based and operated for the USFS. Evergreen bought the remaining Intermountain assets in early 1975. In 1975, Rosenbalm acquired its first Douglas DC-8. It was also the year that Rosenbalm obtained a supplemental type certificate to convert DC-8s to cargo configuration.

=== Contract flying ===
The Air Cargo Deregulation Act passed in late 1977, deregulating the US domestic cargo market. As a result of this, Rosenbalm received a domestic cargo certificate in May 1979, making it a common carrier. By the mid 1980s, Burlington Air Express, CF AirFreight, Emery Worldwide, Purolator Courier and United Parcel Service (UPS) all had air freight and/or package express operations, all of which used contract airlines to operate the aircraft. Rosenbalm was one such airline. In this model, Rosenbalm operated "client-owned" aircraft, supplying crew and maintenance. By the mid-1980s, Rosenbalm flew for Emery and Burlington and later added CF AirFreight. The airline grew strongly and profitably during this period; annual revenues increased from $12 million in 1985 to $57 million in 1989, and the company reported annual profits of $4 million in mid-1990. The relationship with Emery was long-standing and prominent. Rosenbalm first flew DC-8s for Emery in July 1979 and came to operate Emery's entire DC-8 fleet (the largest and only long-haul aircraft that Emery had at the time) including flying to Asia and Europe and participating in the Civil Reserve Air Fleet on Emery's behalf.

=== Ownership and name changes, scheduled service and abrupt end ===
Bill Rosenbalm sold Rosenbalm in November 1987 to a Rosenbalm executive allied to an investment group. In August 1989 the airline was again sold, this time to a public company, Westronix, controlled by Eli Jacobs, a financier and at the time the owner of the Baltimore Orioles. Westronix changed its name to Flagship Express in July 1990. In early 1991 the airline predicted further strong growth. In April 1991, Rosenbalm's name changed to Flagship Express Services (FSX). In July 1991, FSX started scheduled service, the "Flagship Express Network," from Chicago to New York, Los Angeles and San Francisco using three DC-8-71F aircraft leased for the purpose, while continuing its contract work.

In October 1991, FSX stopped operating for Emery. Emery had accounted for 60% of FSX revenue, but FSX said reduced hours under the contract were not providing a sufficient return. The decision moved 17 DC-8s to Emery Worldwide Airlines; Emery said it would save money on the move. Employees came to work December 3, to learn, by phone, that FSX ceased operations at midnight December 2 and was liquidating. Creditors forced the airline into involuntary bankruptcy, then found it hard to find the assets listed on the bankruptcy filing. Employee wage checks bounced.

The airline of this era was headquartered in Ypsilanti, except for the last three months when executives moved to an expensively-appointed office in Bannockburn, Illinois, north of Chicago.

The airline environment was extremely poor in the wake of the Gulf War. Moreover, contract flying demand had diminished substantially. In 1988, UPS transitioned all flying in-house from four airlines it had previously contracted with. In 1987 and 1989, two mergers reduced Purolator, CF AirFreight and Emery Worldwide to a single organization (with the Emery name) under Consolidated Freightways (CF) ownership. In 1989, CF also bought an airline, AirTrain, which it renamed to Emery Worldwide Airlines and said that in the long run it intended to transition all flying in-house.

== Fleet ==
Year-end 1973:

- 4 Curtiss C-46s

Year-end 1977:

- 8 Douglas DC-6
- 2 Douglas DC-8

World Airline Fleets 1979 (copyright 1979) shows Rosenbalm with:

- 2 Douglas DC-8-21F
- 1 Douglas DC-8-32F
- 3 Douglas DC-8-33F

1987-88 World Airline Fleets (copyright 1987) shows Rosenbalm with (client shown in parentheses):

- 3 Douglas DC-8-63F (Burlington)
- 7 Douglas DC-8-63F (Emery)
- 7 Douglas DC-8-73F (Emery)

JP fleets 1989 (copyright May 1989) shows Rosenbalm with (client shown in parentheses):

- 4 Douglas DC-8-63F (Burlington)
- 5 Douglas DC-8-62F (CF Airfreight)
- 10 Douglas DC-8-63F (Emery)
- 7 Douglas DC-8-73F (Emery)

As mentioned in the text, Flagship Express Services also leased three DC-8-71F in 1991 for use in own-branded scheduled service.

== See also ==
- List of defunct airlines of the United States
- Intermountain Aviation
- Evergreen International Airlines
- Burlington Air Express
- CF AirFreight
- Emery Worldwide
- Emery Worldwide Airlines
- Eli Jacobs
