= Emery Worldwide Airlines =

US Ohio-based cargo airline (1989–2001)

IATA	ICAO	Call sign
EB	EWW	EMERY
- Founded: 1985
- Commenced operations: October 1989
- Ceased operations: August 13, 2001
- AOC #: RRXA558B
- Hubs: Dayton, Ohio
- Fleet size: See Fleet
- Parent company: CNF Transportation
- Headquarters: Dayton, Ohio

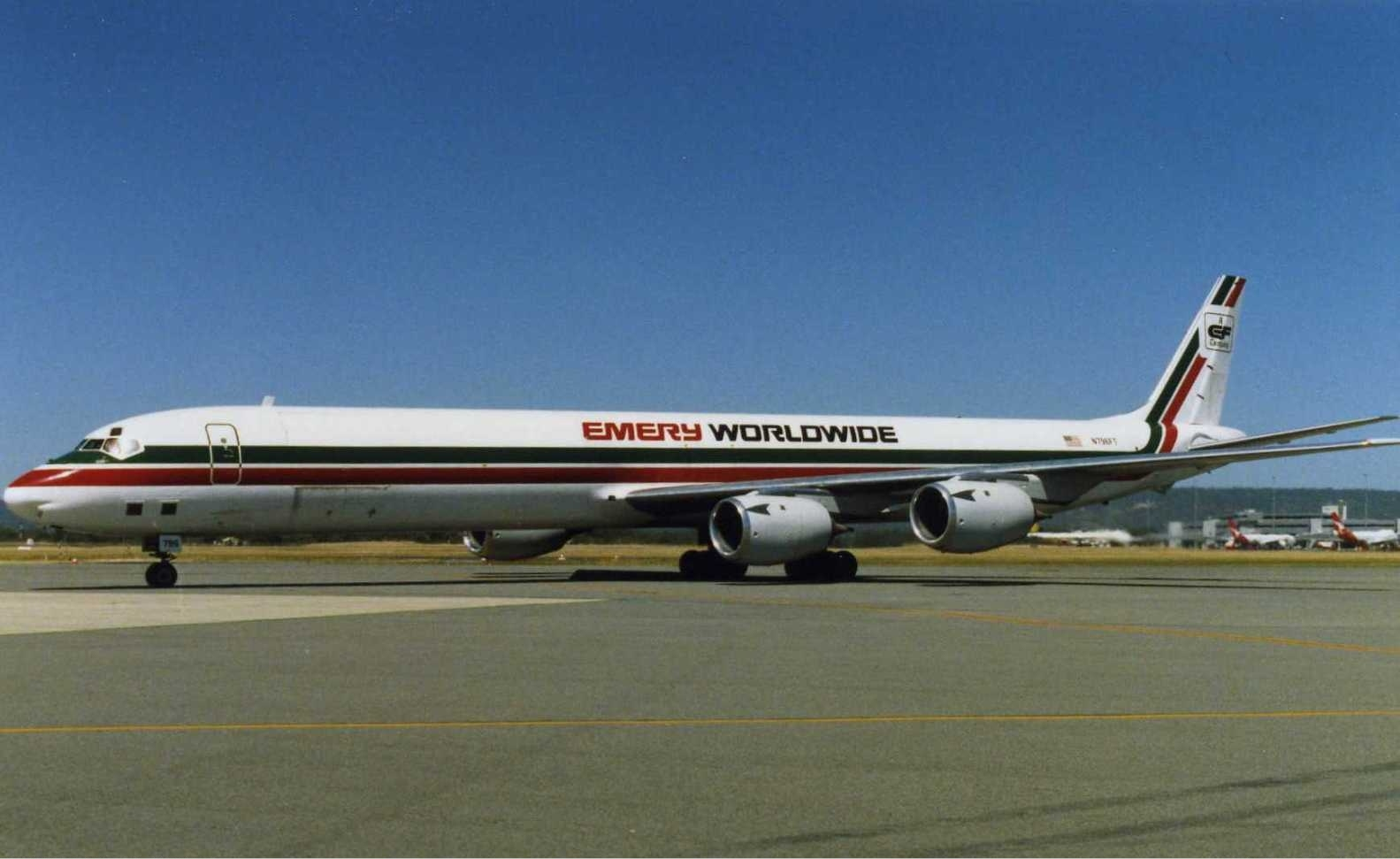
DC-8-73CF Perth Airport early 1990s

Emery Worldwide Airlines (EWA) was the cargo airline subsidiary of CNF Transportation, a US trucking and logistics company. EWA's primary business was carrying high-priority mail, but it also flew air freight. In 1989, CNF-predecessor Consolidated Freightways bought a small freight airline called Air Train, later renaming it to EWA, to bid on a contract to fly for the United States Postal Service (USPS). CNF's air freight business operated under the Emery Worldwide brand and focused on heavy freight (i.e. not small packages or overnight letters) through a hub at Dayton, Ohio, where EWA was also headquartered. By the mid-1990s, EWA was one of the top 10 largest all-cargo airlines in the world by ton-miles carried.

In February 2000, an EWA aircraft crashed on takeoff near Sacramento, California. Ensuing investigations resulted in discovery of widespread safety violations. EWA agreed to suspend operations 13 August 2001. In the same timeframe, EWA suffered the loss of its USPS contracts. In December 2001, CNF chose to not resume EWA operations.

== History ==
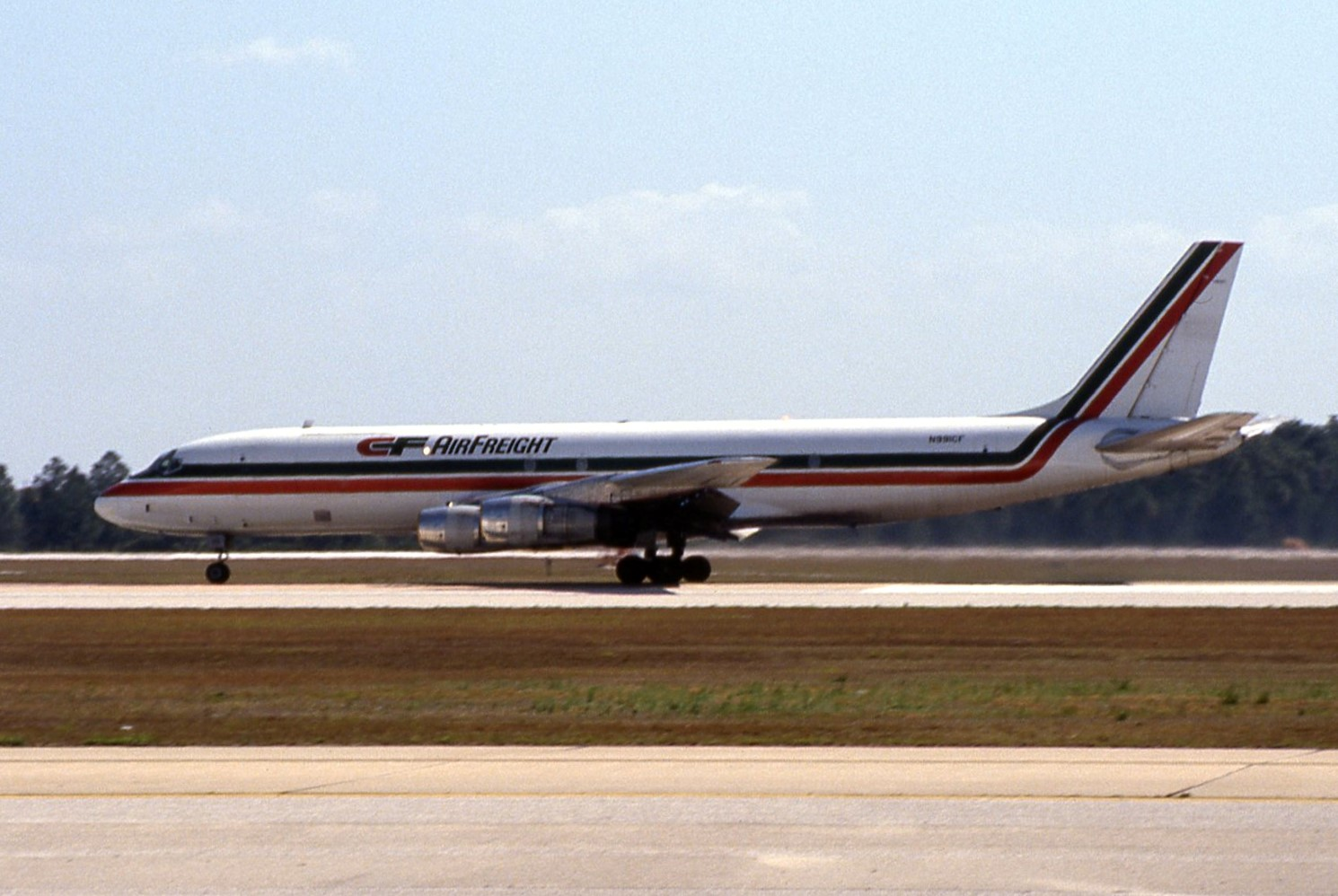
Air Train-operated CF AirFreight DC-8-54F Orlando March 1989

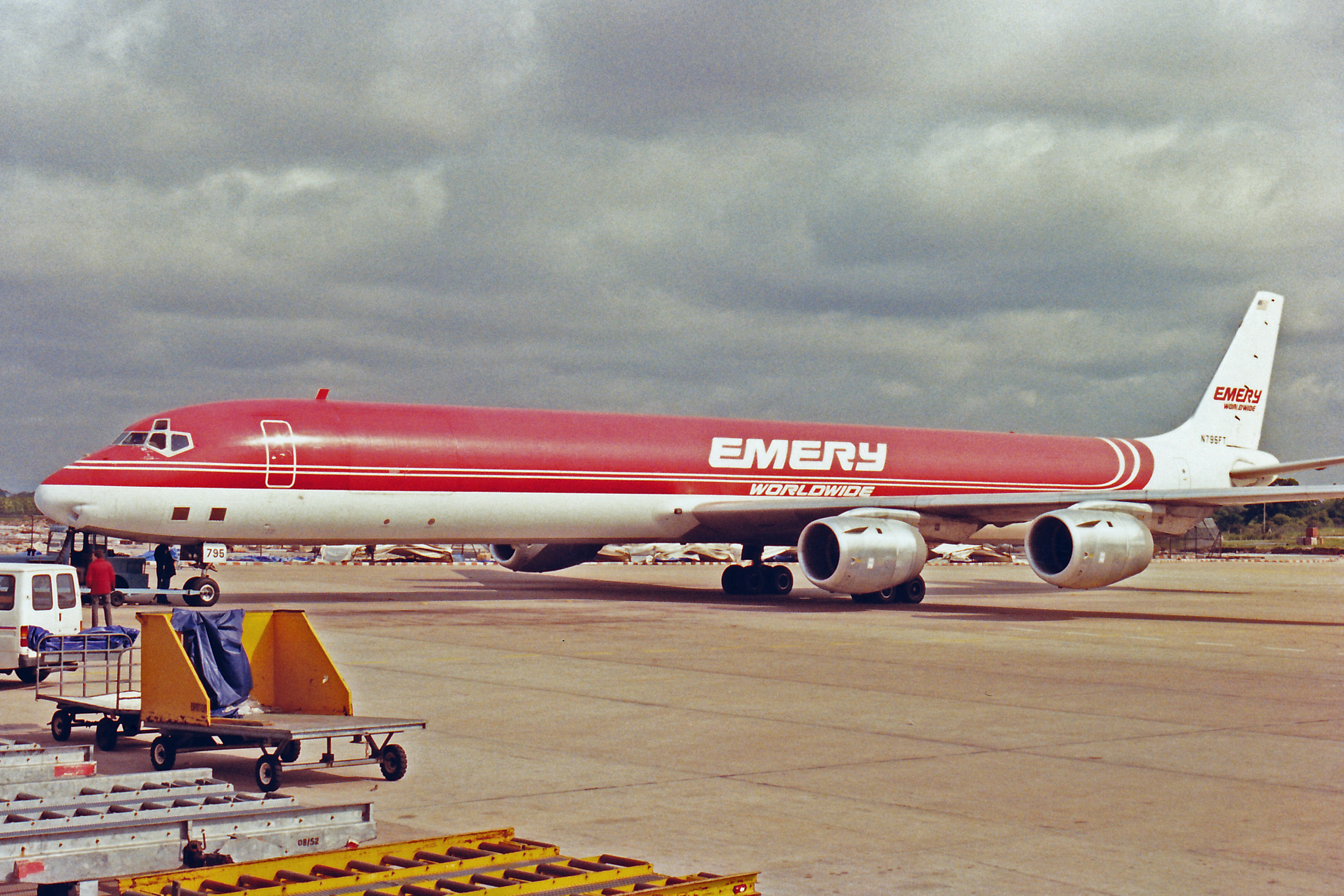
DC-8-73F in Manchester 1987. Although branded Emery Worldwide, this aircraft was operated by Rosenbalm Aviation in the period prior to the existence of Emery Worldwide Airlines. The red-and-white livery was designed by Landor Associates

=== Emery Air Freight and CF AirFreight ===
Emery Air Freight (EAF) was an air freight forwarder that started chartering aircraft in 1976 to serve a hub at Dayton Airport. In December 1981, EAF adopted the Emery Worldwide brand as part of a new image to compete in overnight delivery with Federal Express. In 1989, Consolidated Freightways (CF), a trucking and logistics company, bought Emery. CF had its own air freight operation, CF AirFreight, but adopted the Emery name for the combined operation. At the time, CF AirFreight and the air operations of Emery Worldwide were both virtual airlines; the aircraft were operated by third parties.

=== Air Train ===
Air Train (IATA: GJ, ICAO: ATF, call sign: AIR TRAIN) was a small, San Jose, California, freight airline founded in 1985 and certificated in May 1987. CF AirFreight bought Air Train, then flying four Douglas DC-8s, in May 1989 because it needed to have its own certificated air carrier so that later that year it could bid (and win) a contract to fly for the United States Postal Service (USPS), which would use the former CF AirFreight sort facility in Indianapolis.

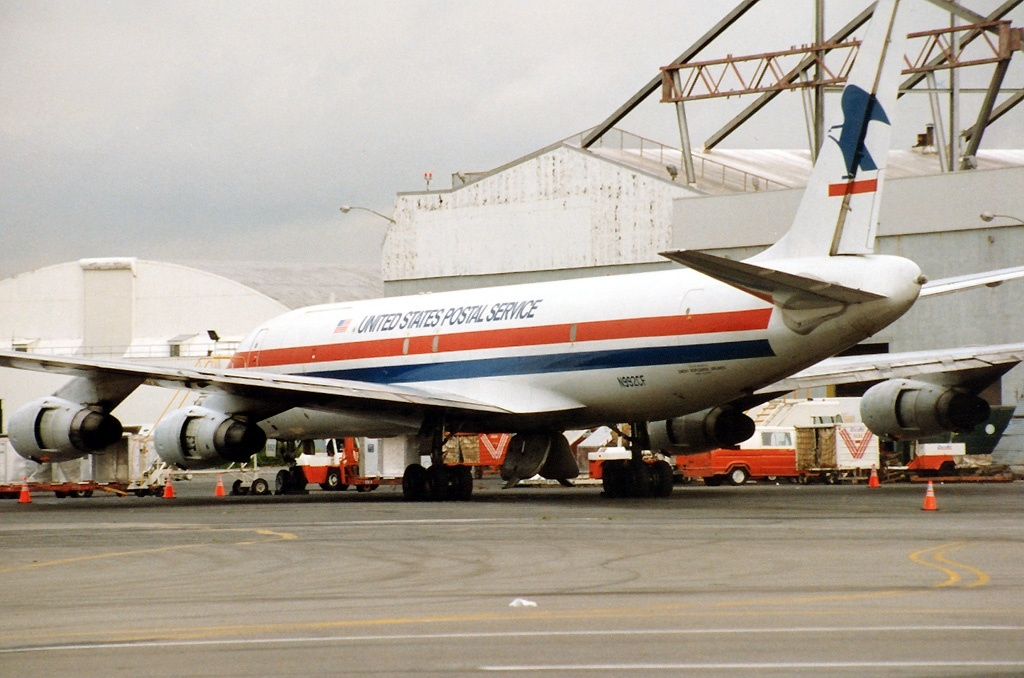
DC-8-54F in USPS service, JFK Airport New York 1993

Air Train became Emery Worldwide Airlines (EWA) in October 1989. In 1990, EWA headquarters transferred from Redwood City, California to Dayton, Ohio. EWA had 31 aircraft by year end 1993.

Table 1: Emery Worldwide Airlines financial results, 1992–2000
USD millions		1992	1993	1994	1995	1996	1997	1998	1999	2000
Op revenue	Mail^{(1)}	141	138	135	203	143	182	620	699	860
Op revenue	Other	47	51	59	93	70	79	145	260	152
Op revenue	Total	187	188	195	296	213	262	766	958	1,013
Operating result		0.8	(2.1)	7.5	15.6	23.7	39.2	12.7	13.5	1.4
Op margin (%)		0.4	-1.1	3.9	5.3	11.1	15.0	1.7	1.4	0.1
(1) Year 2000 includes $60 million termination payment.

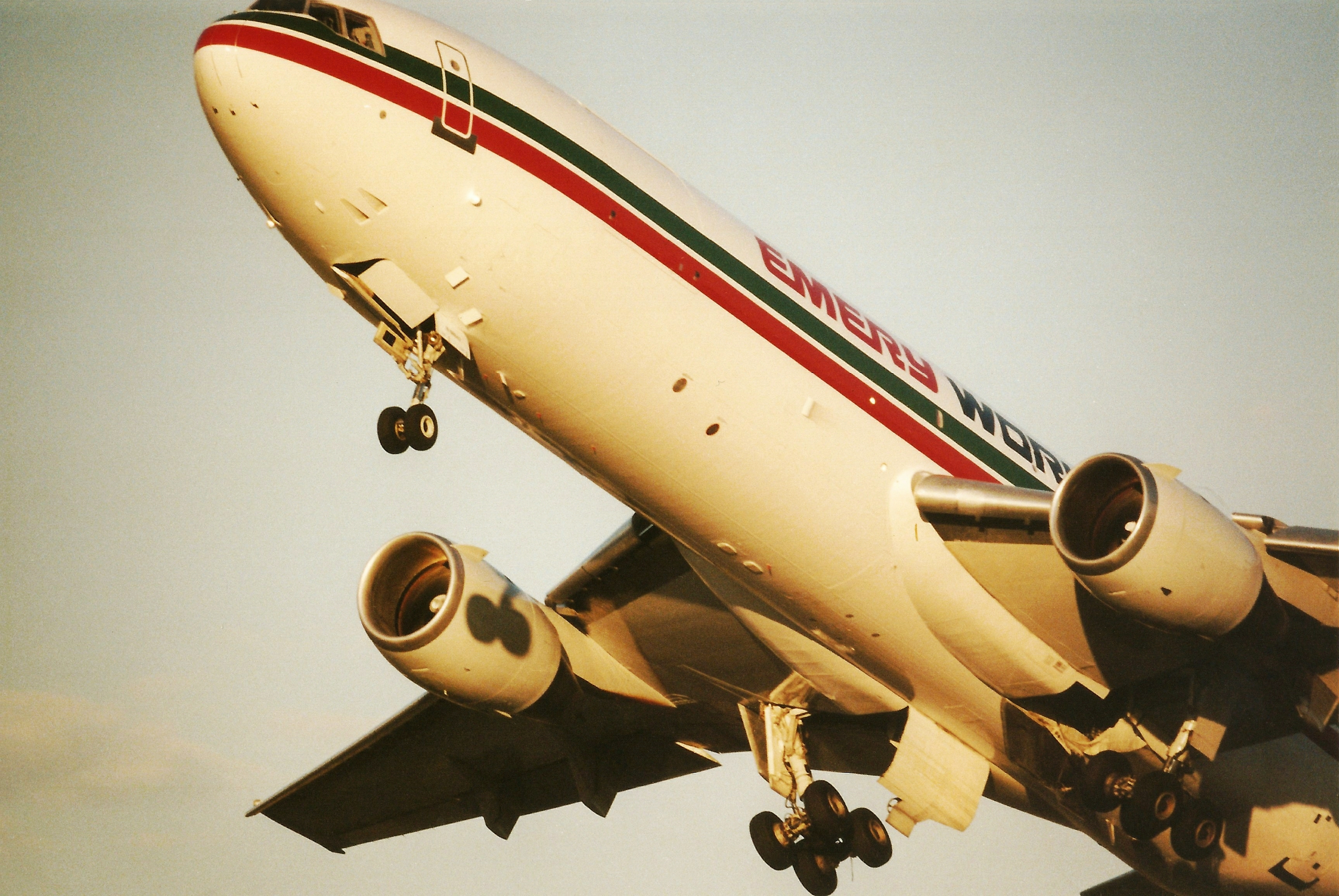
McDonnell Douglas DC-10

=== Postal contracts and heavy freight ===
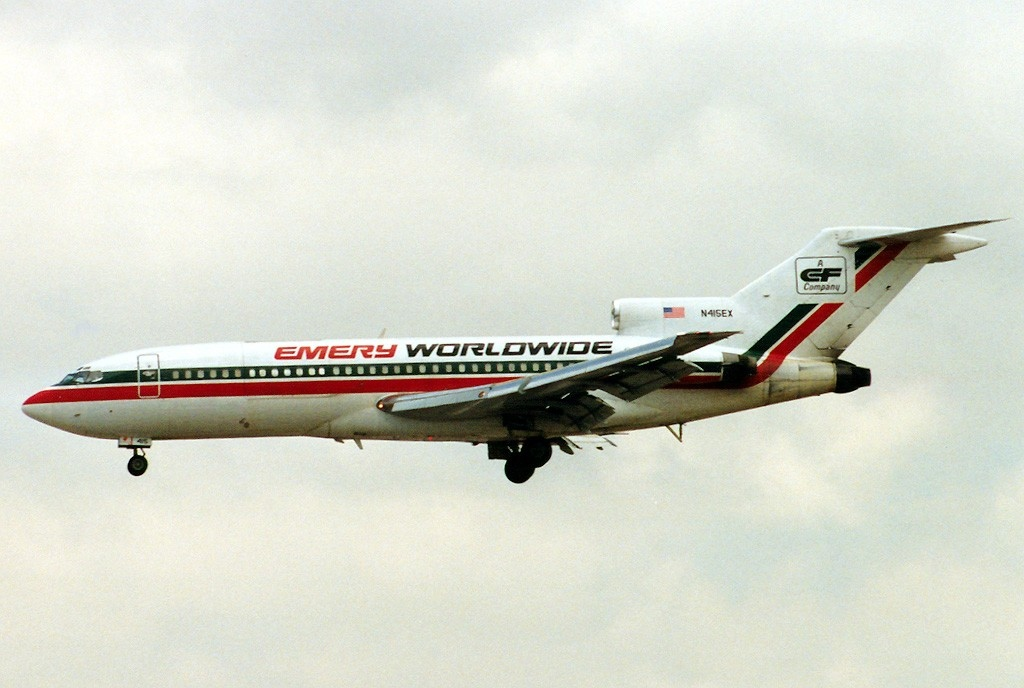
"A CF Company" on the tail. Boeing 727-51C Los Angeles 1991. Operated by Ryan International

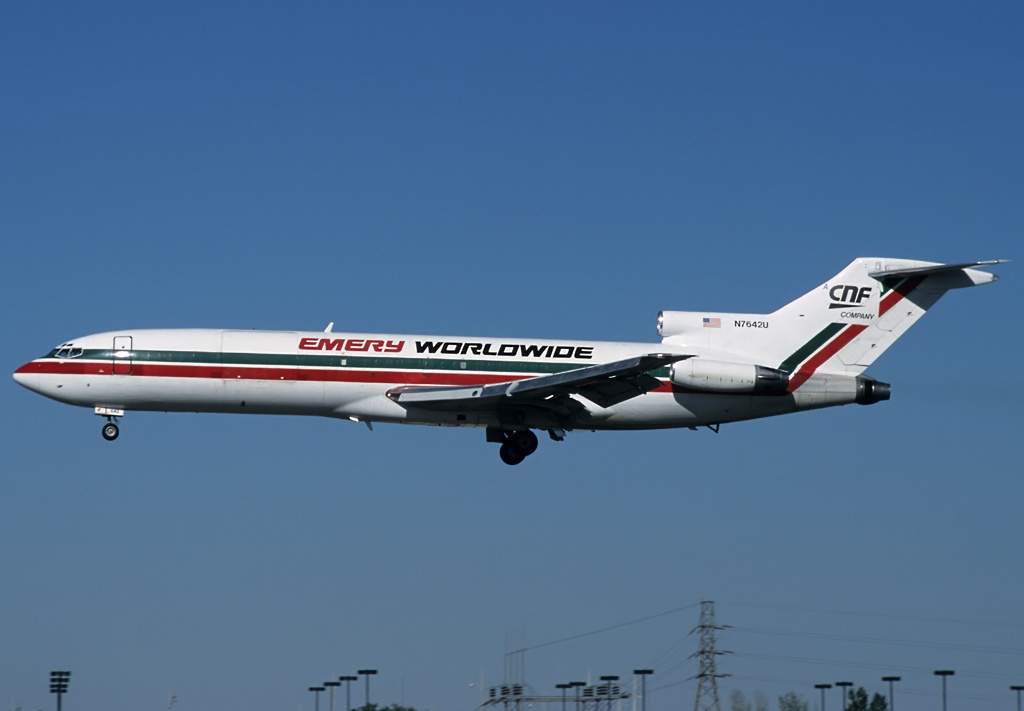
"A CNF Company" on the tail. Boeing 727-200F Minneapolis in 2000

EWA had the USPS contracts to transport (next-day delivery service) Express Mail (from 1989) and (two-day delivery service) Priority Mail (from 1997). Table 1 shows USPS dominated EWA revenue. At year-end 2000, Emery Worldwide leased or owned 74 aircraft, EWA operated 54 of these (see also Subcontractors below). Of the 74, 25 were dedicated to Express Mail network. EWA dedicated two aircraft to Priority Mail and shared a further 19 between Priority Mail and non-USPS business, flying daylight trips for Priority Mail and at night for non-USPS business.

Priority Mail included substantial ground operations. The Priority Mail contract required EWA to establish, equip and staff ten east coast processing centers, ranging in size from 120,000 to 300,000 square ft, and to provide ground transportation between them and other USPS facilities. At year-end 1998, EWA employed 3,800 full time employees for its Priority Mail operations. At year-end 1999, EWA was using 900 trucks, tractors and trailors to support Priority Mail.

Under CF/CNF ownership, Emery Worldwide, concentrated on heavy freight for its non-USPS business. In 1998, the average air freight shipment weighted 248 lbs. In 1996, EWA's corporate parent was re-named CNF Transportation, reflecting the spin-off of the heritage Consolidated Freightways long-haul trucking business to a separate company. The airline's livery changed slightly; the livery before the split had "A CF Company" in a square on the tail. After the split, that changed to "A CNF Company."

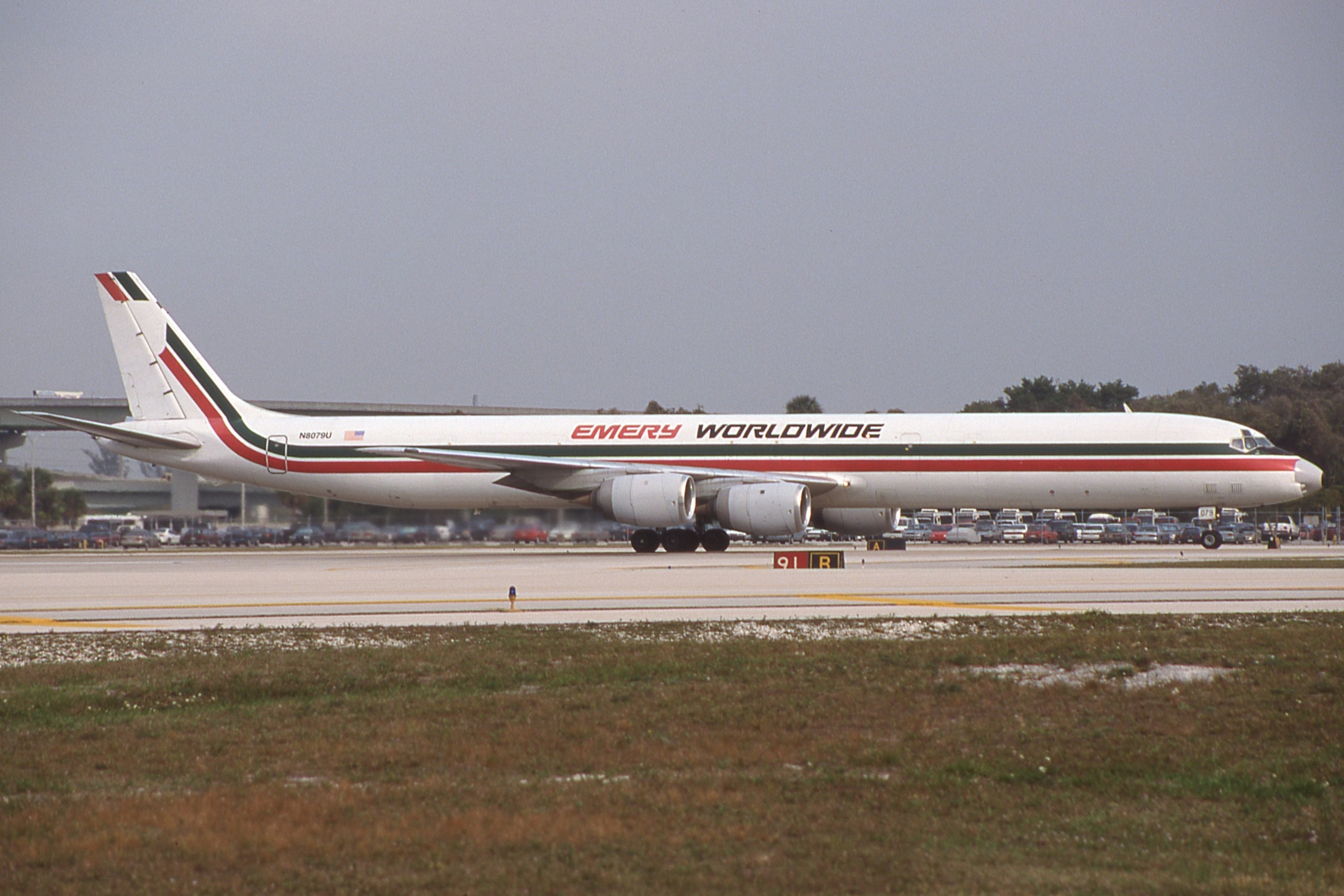
Flight 17 aircraft a year prior to the crash at Fort Lauderdale

In 1996, EWA ranked number 7 in the world among all-cargo carriers by ton-miles.

=== Events of 2000 and 2001 ===
On 16 February 2000, EWA suffered the fatal crash of Flight 17 on takeoff from Sacramento Mather Airport. FAA investigations in 2000–2001 uncovered widespread safety violations.

In November 2000, USPS and EWA announced the termination of the Priority Mail contract. The USPS took over ground services as of January, EWA provided some air service through April.

In response to an FAA request, EWA suspended operations on 13 August 2001. USPS notified EWA that it was cancelling the Express Mail contract as of August.

On 4 December 2001, CNF informed the FAA that it would not resume EWA operations. A year later it turned in its operating certificate to the FAA. The Dayton hub continued to operate with contractors.

On its last day of operation, EWA had a fleet of 37 aircraft: 29 DC-8s and 8 DC-10s.

== Subcontractors ==
Ryan International Airlines was a subcontractor for Emery Worldwide from the beginning, when it stepped in to fly Boeing 727s that Air Train had been scheduled to fly. It was there at the end when it stepped in to fly for Emery Worldwide when EWA suspended operations. Express One is another airline known to have worked for EWA.

At year-end 2000, Emery Worldwide, overall, had 74 aircraft. EWA was operating 54, implying 20 were at subcontractors.

== Fleet ==
January 1998:

- 9 Boeing 727-100F
- 8 Boeing 727-200F
- 2 Douglas DC-8-54F
- 7 Douglas DC-8-62F
- 9 Douglas DC-8-63F
- 10 Douglas DC-8-71F
- 13 Douglas DC-8-73F
- 1 Douglas DC-9-15F
- 4 Lockheed L-1011-200F

== Accidents and incidents ==
- February 16, 2000: Flight 17, a Douglas DC-8-71F (registered N8079U) crashed on take-off on a scheduled cargo flight from Sacramento Mather Airport in California with three crew members aboard. Bound for Dayton, Ohio, the aircraft was destroyed by impact forces and post-crash fire; there were no survivors. The accident was caused by a detached elevator control arm, which was believed to be due to a missing cotter pin. More broadly, the safety culture of the airline was poor.

== See also ==
- List of defunct airlines of the United States
- Emery Worldwide
- CF AirFreight
- Consolidated Freightways
