= Sacramento Mather Airport =

Airport in Sacramento County, California, United States

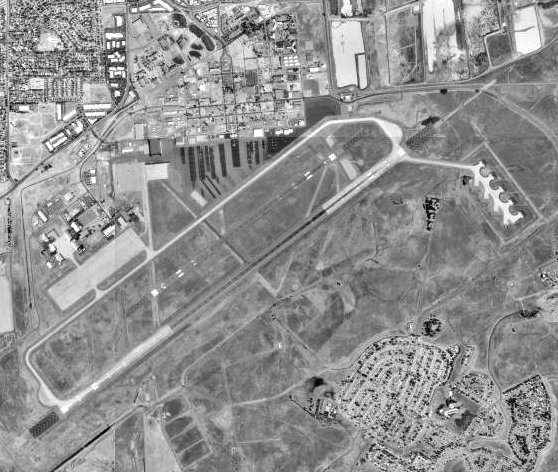
- USGS photo, 17 August 1998
- IATA: MHR; ICAO: KMHR; FAA LID: MHR

Summary
- Airport type: Public
- Owner: Sacramento County
- Serves: Sacramento, California
- Elevation AMSL: 98 ft / 30 m
- Coordinates: 38°33′14″N 121°17′51″W
- Interactive map of Sacramento Mather Airport

Runways
Direction	Length		Surface
Direction	ft	m	Surface
04R/22L	11,301	3,445	Asphalt/concrete
04L/22R	6,081	1,853	Asphalt

Helipads
Number	Length		Surface
Number	ft	m	Surface
H1	30	9	Asphalt
H2	100	30	Asphalt

Statistics (2018)
- Aircraft operations: 99,467
- Based aircraft: 52
- Source: FAA and airport web page

Sacramento Mather Airport (IATA: MHR, ICAO: KMHR, FAA LID: MHR) (Mather Airport) is a public airport 11 miles east of Sacramento, in Sacramento County, California, United States. It is on the site of Mather Air Force Base, which closed in 1993 pursuant to BRAC action. The airport is one of 4 airports serving Sacramento, the others being Sacramento International Airport, Sacramento Executive Airport, and Franklin Field.

== Facilities ==
Sacramento Mather Airport covers 2,875 acres (1,163 ha) at an elevation of 98 feet (30 m). It has two runways: 04L/22R is 6,081 by 150 feet (1,853 x 46 m) asphalt; 04R/22L is 11,301 by 150 feet (3,445 x 46 m) concrete/asphalt. The airport has two helipads: H1 is 30 x 30 ft. (9 x 9 m); H2 is 100 x 100 ft. (30 x 30 m).

For the year ending December 31, 2018, the airport had 99,467 aircraft operations, an average of 272 per day: 51% general aviation, 13% air taxi, 5% airline, and 32% military. Fifty-two aircraft were then based at this airport: 10 single-engined, 1 multiengined, and 41 military.

== Cargo airlines ==
Airlines	Destinations
DHL Aviation	Cincinnati, Salt Lake City
UPS Airlines	Chicago-Rockford, Louisville, Oakland, Ontario, Portland (OR), Reno/Tahoe, Sioux Falls

== Incidents ==
On February 16, 2000 Emery Worldwide Flight 17, a DC-8 cargo plane crashed shortly after takeoff from this airport, killing all three crewmembers. This incident was profiled on the Canadian TV show Mayday (known as Air Disasters in the United States) on the Smithsonian Channel.
