= Jack DeBoer =

American entrepreneur, hotel innovator, builder, and businessman (1931–2021)

Jack Peter DeBoer (January 15, 1931 – March 12, 2021) was an American entrepreneur, hotel innovator, builder, and businessman. He was a founder of five national brands of extended-stay hotels (apartment hotels): Residence Inn, Summerfield Suites, Candlewood Suites, Value Place, and WaterWalk hotels and apartments.

== Early life ==
DeBoer was born and raised in Kalamazoo, Michigan. He graduated in 1952, from what is now Michigan State University with a degree in business. He served for the next two years as a military police officer. Then he joined his father's real estate business.

== Business career ==
DeBoer and his father built homes. By 1973, his company had built more than 16,000 apartments in 30 cities across 25 states. National Real Estate Investor magazine recognized him as the "second-largest multi-family developer in the United States".

In 1976, Robert L. Brock and he opened the first Residence Inn in Wichita, Kansas. Designed for people who might need a room for a few weeks or months, it grew into a chain and was sold to Marriott Corporation in 1987. It was renamed Residence Inn by Marriott.

In 1995, he founded Candlewood Hotel Company (today's Candlewood Suites). In 2003, he founded the hotel chain Value Place. Today it is known as WoodSpring Hotels and owned by Choice Hotels. He also founded Summerfield Suites (now Hyatt House Hotels) and WaterWalk hotels and apartments.

His other ventures included Grand Champions Club, a tennis facility and health club in Aspen, Colorado, and Hix Corporation, a manufacturer of printing equipment, electric and gas dryers, and machines for the food industry based in Pittsburg, Kansas.

== Personal life ==
In 1953, DeBoer married Marilyn Sanders. He was survived by his wife, two children and three grandchildren.

DeBoer was an avid aviator. At the time of his death, he held three-kilometer world speed records for jet aircraft under 18,000 pounds.

While flying around the world, he and his wife saw chaos and poverty in Myanmar that left deep impressions. They funded World Vision healthcare programs and sponsored fellowships to nurture leaders in the country.

In 2011, he published the book Risk Only Money: Success in Business Without Risking Family, Friends and Reputation, which discussed the lessons he learned in life.

He died after a long battle with cancer.
