= Express One International =

IATA	ICAO	Call sign
EO	LHN	LONGHORN
- Founded: 1983; 43 years ago
- Ceased operations: 2014; 12 years ago
- Hubs: Orlando Sanford International Airport
- Fleet size: 1 (at time of bankruptcy)
- Headquarters: Orlando, Florida, United States
- Website: www.flyexpressone.com

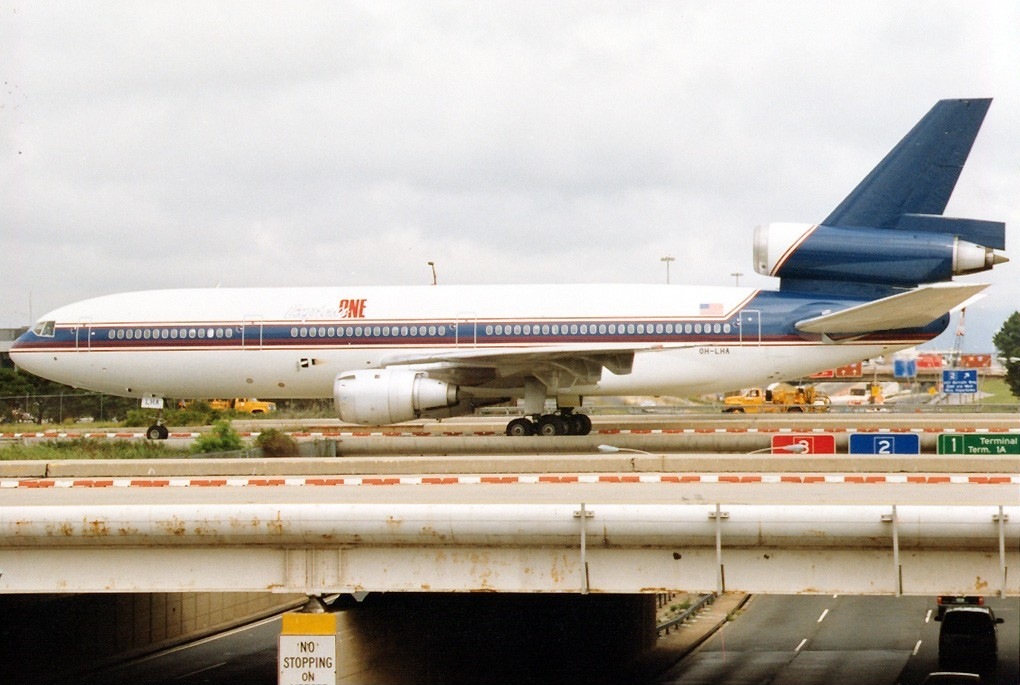
A DC-10 leased from Finnair at John F. Kennedy International Airport in August 1993.

Express One International was an airline based in Orlando, Florida, USA. It operated domestic and international cargo services, and charter passenger services throughout the U.S., Canada, Mexico, and the Caribbean, as well as wet and dry leasing. Its main base was in Orlando Sanford International Airport.

== History ==
The airline was established in 1983 by Alinda and Jim Wikert as Jet East International, flying one Boeing 727-100 on a contract from DHL. It started operations that same year. At its peak, the company was flying freight with over 20 Boeing 727s and passengers in several Douglas DC-9s from hubs in Austin, Texas, Indianapolis, Indiana, Atlantic City, New Jersey, and Brussels, Belgium, when it was purchased by Orchard Capital in 2000. Express One also leased two Boeing 727-200 jetliners in passenger configuration to a new start-up air carrier, Western Pacific Airlines.

According to the April 2, 1995 edition of the Official Airline Guide (OAG), Express One International was operating scheduled passenger service round trip between Las Vegas (LAS) and Minneapolis/St. Paul (MSP) with Boeing 727-200 aircraft.

2001 was a difficult year for the company, and by July, several key contracts expired without renewal. A severe blow was dealt in August 2001 when the United States Postal Service cancelled its contracts with its existing carriers, and turned these duties over to FedEx. The company saw a short reprieve when Emery Worldwide suddenly eliminated its own airline in favor of using contract carriers, and Express One received a short-term contract to carry freight until the end of 2001.

Having secured little new business by the end of the year, the company removed most of its aircraft from service, and furloughed the vast majority of its employees to conserve resources. However, this was not enough to prevent it from filing for bankruptcy, and ceasing operations by mid-2002.

In 2002, a group of six investors, headed by Richard C. Byers and Larry Brinker, purchased all the company's common stock, assets, training programs, and intellectual properties, as well as its name, logo, property, and operating certificate, and the company was moved to Orlando Sanford International Airport in Florida.

In February 2008, Express One and Joseph Kuchta were debarred from government contracting as a result of collusive bidding conduct and fraud. Express One's debarment expired on January 31, 2010, and Joseph Kuchta's debarment continued until Jan 31, 2013.

== Fleet ==
The Express One International fleet consisted of the following aircraft (at April 2014):

- 1 Piper Navajo PA-31-350 Chieftain

=== Previously operated ===
In August 2006, the airline also operated:

- 3 Boeing 727-200F
- 1 Boeing 727-100F
- McDonnell Douglas DC-10
- McDonnell Douglas DC-9

== See also ==
- List of defunct airlines of the United States
