= BAX Global =

Airline of the United States

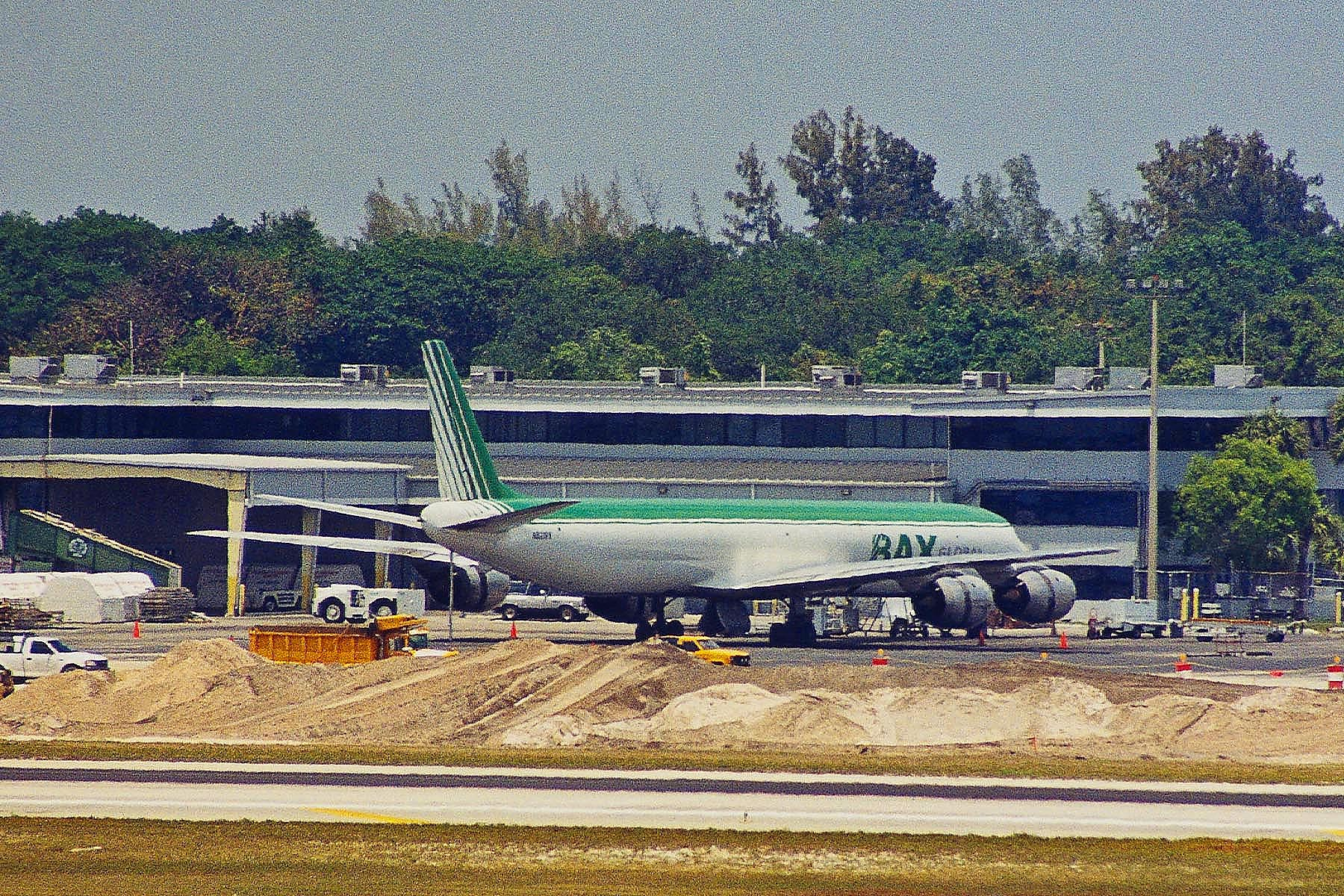
- A BAX Global Douglas DC-8-71(F) (N821BX) at Fort Lauderdale–Hollywood International Airport.
- Formerly: Burlington Northern Airfreight, Inc. (1972–1982); Burlington Air Express (1982–1997)
- Type: Air transport
- Industry: Logistics
- Founded: June 15, 1971; 55 years ago
- Defunct: 2011; 15 years ago
- Fate: Operations ceased
- Headquarters: Irvine, California
- Areas served: Worldwide
- Services: Package delivery
- Parent: BAX Global

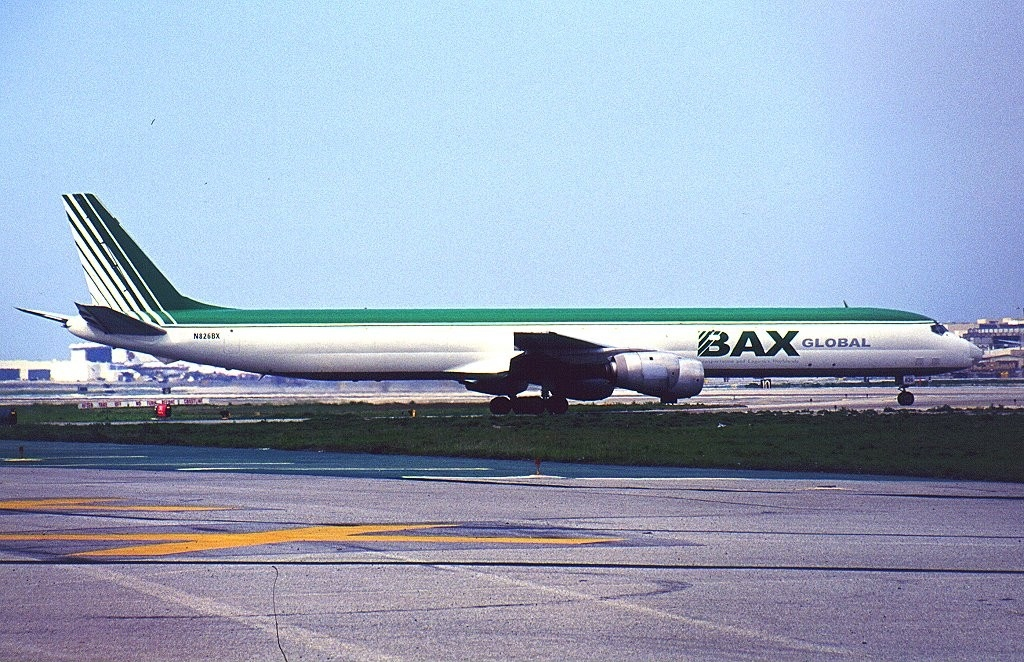
A BAX Global Douglas DC-8-71(F) (N826BX) at Los Angeles International Airport.

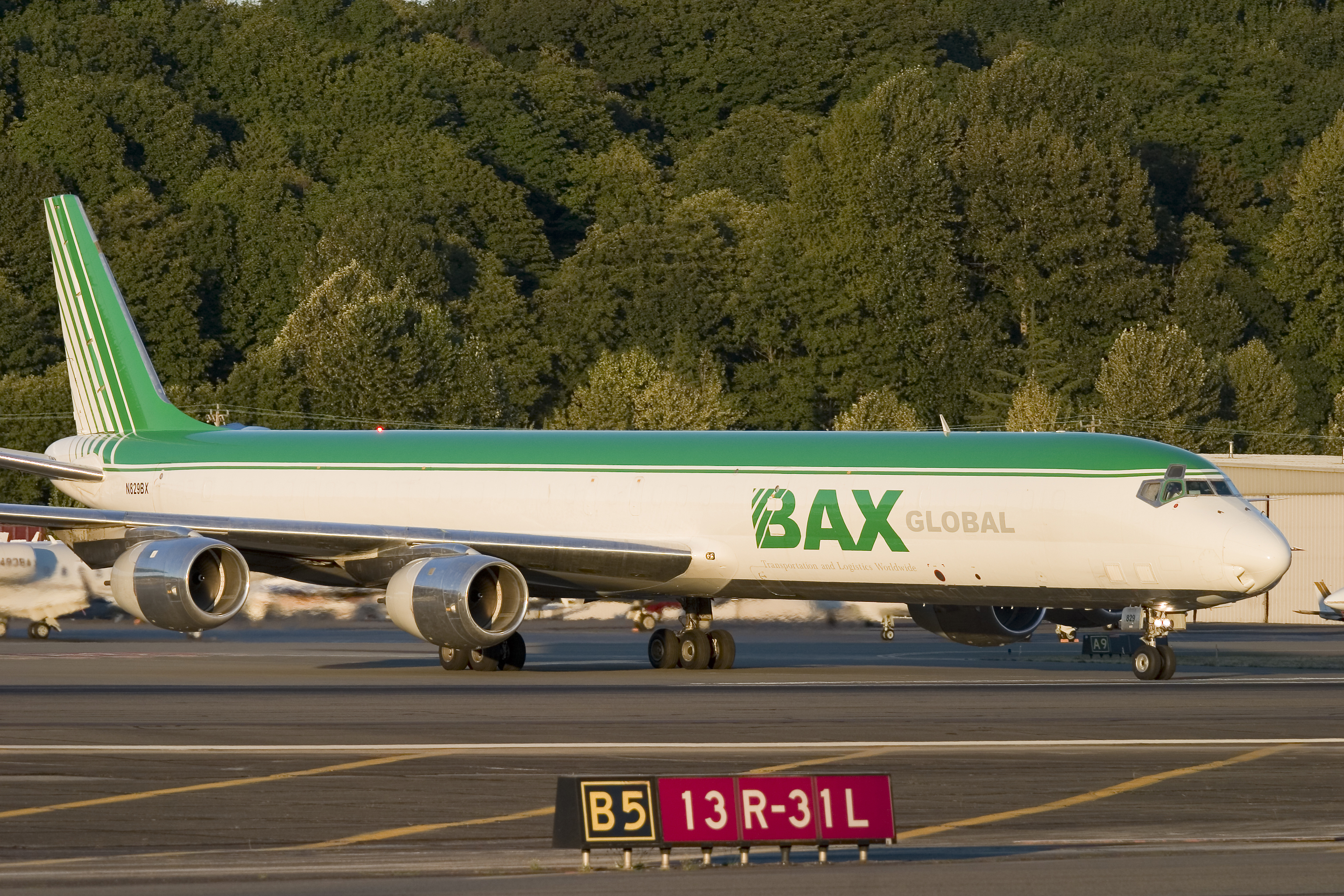
A BAX Global Douglas DC-8-71(F) (N829BX) at King County International Airport.

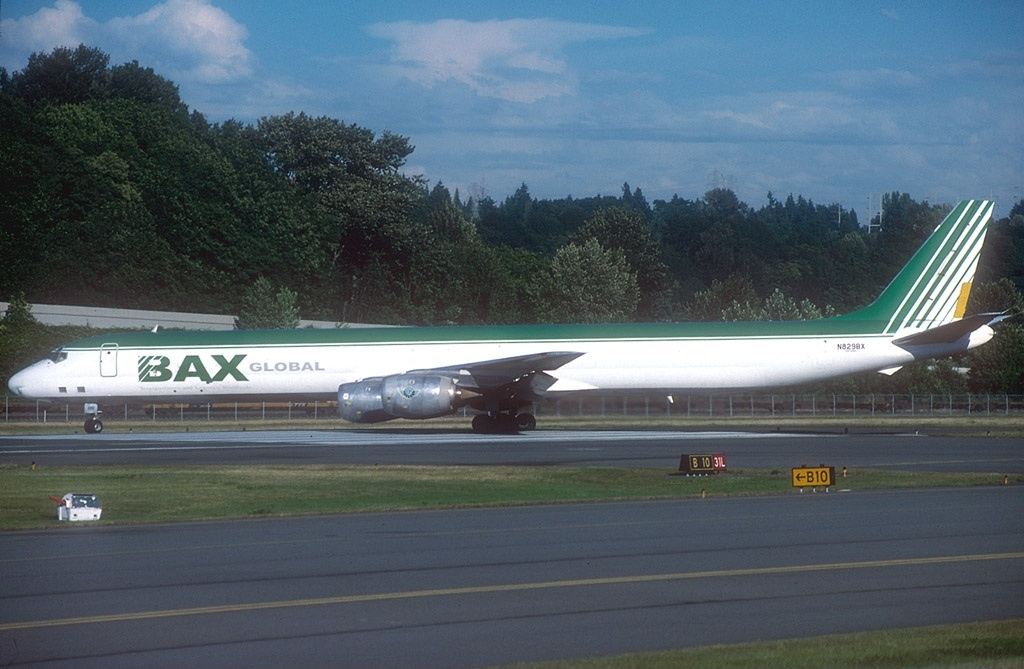
A BAX Global Douglas DC-8-71(F) (N829BX) at King County International Airport.

BAX Global was an American international shipping company that was headquartered in Irvine, California, and had other major offices in Australia, Singapore, London, the Netherlands and Toledo, Ohio. The company was a subsidiary of the Burlington Northern Railroad.

In January 2006, BAX Global was acquired by DB Logistics and was integrated with Schenker, the land, sea, and air freight branch of DB Logistics.

DB Logistics is the freight and logistics division of Deutsche Bahn, the State-owned German railway company. In July 2011 Schenker Inc. announced it would give up its airfreight activities and stop the use of the remaining 20 aircraft.

== History ==
The company originally opened for business in ten cities in the United States on June 15, 1972, as Burlington Northern Airfreight, Inc. (BNAFI), a subsidiary of Burlington Northern Railroad. In 1982, BNAFI was acquired by the Pittston Company, which later became Brink's. In 1986, BNAFI changed its name to Burlington Air Express, repositioning itself as an overnight air express company. The company acquired WTC Air Freight in 1987 and the assets of failed air freight carrier Roadway Global Air from Caliber System in 1995. In 1997 the company changed its name to BAX Global, reflecting its expansion over all continents.

On January 31, 2006, BAX Global was acquired from Brink's by DB Logistics, the Transportation and Logistics Division of Deutsche Bahn, for $1.1 billion.

Burlington Air Express had a dedicated fleet of aircraft owned and operated by Air Transport International (ATI), a sister company also owned by Brinks. At the time of the sale of BAX Global to DB Logistics, ATI was sold to Cargo Holdings International. Cargo Holdings International is still under contract with BAX Global to provide dedicated lift.

In July 2011, Schenker Inc. (DB Schenker Logistics) announced it would give up its domestic airfreight activities in the US, Canada and Mexico and therefore would stop using the remaining fleet of 20 aircraft in the coming week as cargo had begun to be moved by trucks. This decision affected 700 employees and represented 10% of the Schenker Inc. business in this area.

== Former fleet ==
Before acquisition:

- 18 Douglas DC-8F
- 10 Boeing 727-200F
- Several Boeing 747 for international charters

== See also ==
- List of defunct airlines of the United States
