= Emery Worldwide Airlines Flight 17 =

2000 aviation accident in California

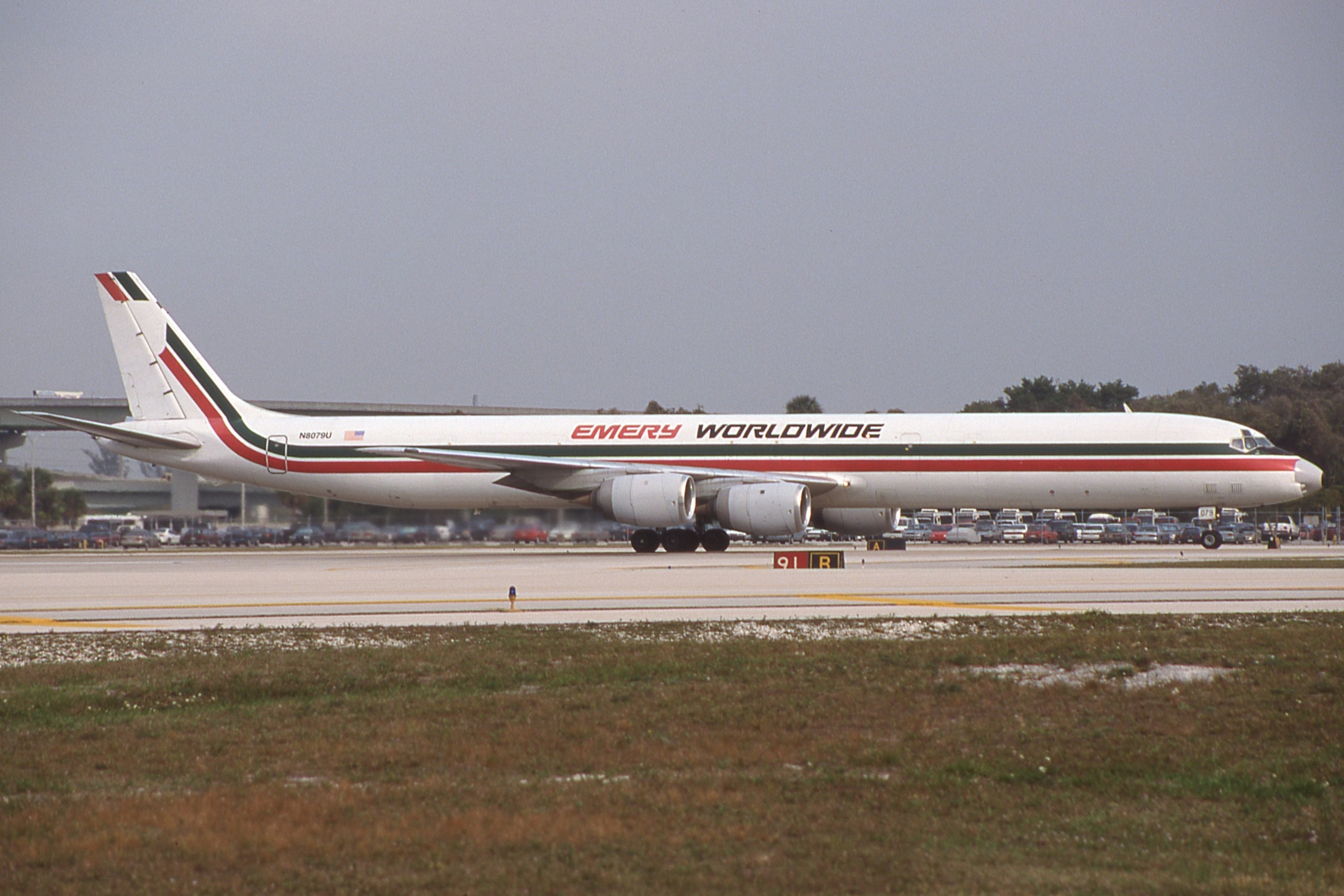
- N8079U, the aircraft involved in the accident, photographed in 1999

Accident
- Date: February 16, 2000
- Summary: Loss of pitch control due to improper maintenance
- Site: Sacramento Mather Airport, Mather, California, United States; 38°33′40″N 121°15′4″W

Aircraft
- Aircraft type: Douglas DC-8-71F
- Operator: Emery Worldwide Airlines
- IATA flight No.: EB017
- ICAO flight No.: EWW017
- Call sign: EMERY 017
- Registration: N8079U
- Flight origin: Reno–Tahoe International Airport, Reno, Nevada, United States
- Stopover: Sacramento Mather Airport, Mather, California, United States
- Destination: James M. Cox Dayton International Airport, Dayton, Ohio, United States
- Occupants: 3
- Crew: 3
- Fatalities: 3
- Survivors: 0

Emery Worldwide Airlines Flight 17 was a regularly scheduled United States domestic cargo flight, flying from Reno, Nevada to Dayton, Ohio with an intermediate stopover at Sacramento Mather Airport. On February 16, 2000, the Douglas DC-8 operating the flight crashed onto an automobile salvage yard in Rancho Cordova, California shortly after takeoff, resulting in the deaths of all three crew members on board. The crew reported control problems during takeoff and attempted unsuccessfully to return to Mather Airport. The carrier, Emery Worldwide Airlines, was the 7th largest all-cargo airline in the world by ton-miles, in the year 2000.

== Aircraft and crew ==
The aircraft involved in the accident was built in 1968 as a Douglas DC-8-61, serial number 45947, registration N8079U for United Airlines which operated it until 1990. It was operated by Líneas Aéreas Paraguayas (1990–1994). In March 1994 it was modified as a freighter prior to operation by Emery Worldwide Airlines. In July 1983, the aircraft was modified from a DC-8-61 to a DC-8-71 by replacement of engines (to CFM56-2) and certain other modifications.

At the time of the accident, the airframe had accumulated about 84,447 flight hours in 33,395 flight cycles.

The flight crew consisted of Captain Kevin Stables (43), who had logged 13,329 flight hours and 2,128 hours in type; First Officer George Land (35), who had logged 4,511 flight hours and 2,080 in type; and Flight Engineer Russell Hicks (38), who had logged 9,775 flight hours and 675 in type.

== Accident ==
The flight was a regular domestic cargo flight from Reno–Tahoe International Airport (RNO) to James M. Cox Dayton International Airport (DAY) with an intermediate stopover at Sacramento Mather Airport in Mather, California. The flight was operated by Emery Worldwide Airlines – then a major cargo airline in the U.S. – using a Douglas DC-8-71F with the three crew members on board.

After completing the taxi checklist, the crew members initiated the before-take-off checklist at around 19:47 local time. They then advised local traffic that they were going to initiate the take-off from runway 22L. The crew members were later cleared for take-off. The crew applied a continuous nose-down input during the take-off roll.

As the aircraft reached its V1 speed, the captain called "rotate". The pitch then increased from 0.2 to 5.3°. Data from the control column indicated the crew at the time was still applying forward movement to the control column (nose-down input) in an effort to check the ever-increasing nose-up attitude, but somehow the nose rose upward from 14.5 to 17.4° as the crew added more force to the control column. The aircraft reached V2 and began to lift off.

Immediately after the aircraft lifted off from the runway, the aircraft entered a left turn and the first officer quickly stated that Flight 17 would like to return to Sacramento. The engine's speed began to decrease and the stick shaker activated for the first time. The captain declared an emergency on Flight 17, believing a load shift had occurred. The aircraft began to move erratically, and the elevator deflection and the bank angle began to decrease and increase, respectively. The aircraft began to descend.

The captain repeated the emergency declaration as the engine's speed began to increase. At the time, the aircraft was descending with a steepening bank of 11°. The crew then added power and the aircraft began to climb again. As the aircraft continued to climb, the bank angle began to increase to the left. The captain stated that Flight 17 "has an extreme CG problem."

The aircraft then continued to fly in a northwesterly heading. The crew was trying to stabilize the aircraft as it began to sway to the left and to the right. The ground proximity warning system (GPWS) then started to sound. At 19:51, the aircraft's left wing contacted a concrete and steel support column for an overhang attached to a two-story building, located adjacent to the southeast edge of the salvage yard. The DC-8 then crashed onto the salvage yard, touching off "a hellish scene of smoke, flames and exploding cars [that] could be seen for miles". All three crew members on board were killed.

== Investigation ==
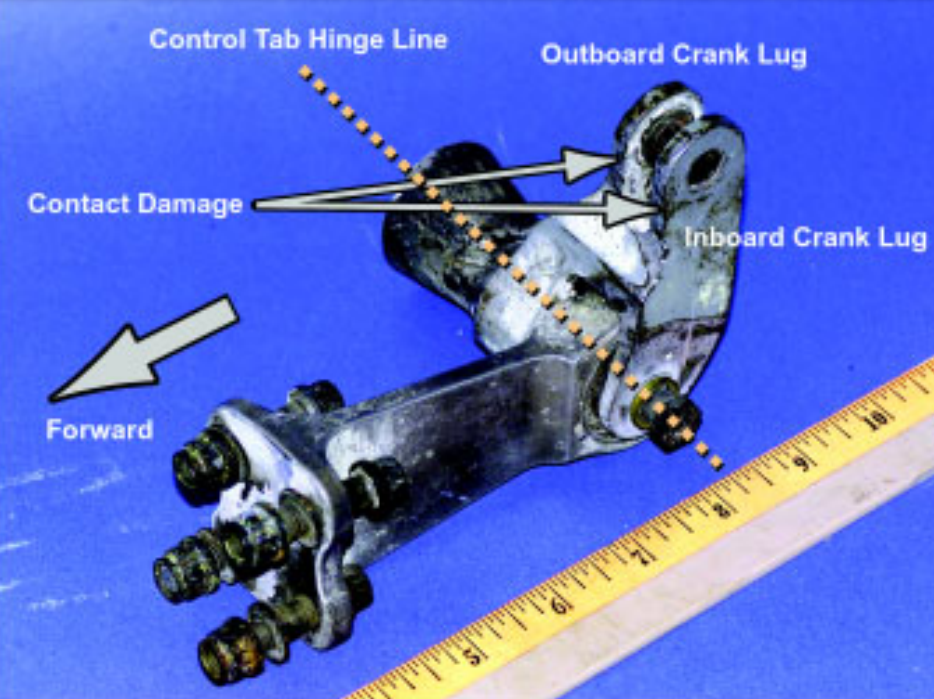
Part of the right elevator of the accident aircraft after the accident

An investigation by the National Transportation Safety Board (NTSB) revealed that during the aircraft's rotation, a control rod to the right elevator control tab detached, causing a loss of pitch control. The NTSB further found that an incorrect maintenance procedure, which was implemented by Emery Worldwide Airlines, introduced an incorrect torque-loading on the bolts that were supposed to connect the control rod. The NTSB released its final report in 2003, three years after the accident. The report stated that the crash of Flight 17 was caused by the detachment of the right elevator control tab. The disconnection was caused by the failure to properly secure and inspect the attachment bolt.

The NTSB then added: "The safety issues discussed in this report include DC-8 elevator position indicator installation and usage, adequacy of DC-8 maintenance work cards (required inspection items), and DC-8 elevator control tab design. Safety recommendations are addressed to the Federal Aviation Administration".

Fifteen recommendations were issued by the NTSB. One of these was to evaluate every DC-8 on U.S. soil to prevent further crashes that could be caused by the disconnection of the right elevator tab.

The Federal Aviation Administration subsequently found more than 100 maintenance violations by the airline, including one that caused another accident on April 26, 2001: A Douglas DC-8-71F (registered N8076U) landed with a left main landing gear up at Nashville International Airport in Tennessee. The aircraft sustained minor damage and the three-member crew was not injured. Post-accident investigation found improper maintenance to the left main landing gear was at fault.

Emery Worldwide Airlines had its entire fleet grounded on August 13, 2001, and it ceased operations permanently on December 5, 2001.

== Dramatization ==
The crash of Emery Worldwide Airlines Flight 17 was featured in the first episode of the 18th season in the Canadian documentary show Mayday, also known as Air Disasters in the United States and as Air Crash Investigation in Europe and the rest of the world. The episode was titled "Nuts and Bolts". One of the investigators of the accident, John Goglia, kept the control tab of the aircraft, which was shown in the episode.

== See also ==
- Trans International Airlines Flight 863 – another accident involving a DC-8 freighter and problems with the right elevator 30 years before
