= Emery Worldwide =

Air freight forwarder and air cargo carrier

- Formerly: Emery Air Freight Corporation
- Industry: Transportation
- Incorporated: Delaware
- Founded: 22 April 1946 start of operations: 6 August 1946
- Founder: John C. Emery, Sr., Leonard G. Hunt
- Fate: Acquired
- Successor: United Parcel Service (UPS)
- Headquarters: New York City
- Services: Freight Forwarding; Customs Broker

Emery Worldwide was an American air freight forwarder and air cargo carrier founded in 1946. Emery was a pioneer in the early air freight industry, initially renting space on existing carrier routes before developing a fleet of dedicated aircraft. For nearly 40 years, Emery was the largest freight carrier in the world. Emery was acquired by Consolidated Freightways in 1989 and by United Parcel Service (under the name Menlo Worldwide Forwarding) in 2004.

== History ==
Emery Worldwide logo in use from 1981 - 1989

=== Emery Air Freight (1946–1979) ===
In 1946, John C. Emery Sr. and Leonard G. Hunt founded Emery Air Freight Corporation (EAF) in New York City. Emery worked as assistant to the president of Railway Express Agency prior to World War II. EAF's business model was informed by Emery's experience during World War II as head of transportation at the U.S. Navy Bureau of Supplies and Accounts, specifically its focus on tracking the progress of every package across country. Emery was the first air freight forwarder to apply for a license from the Civil Aeronautics Board (CAB) as a common carrier, despite opposition from scheduled airlines. In 1948, Emery was granted common air freight carrier license No. 1 by the CAB.

By 1966, Emery had expanded significantly, operating 60 offices in the US and 30 internationally, with over 1,400 employees. The company managed 40% of the cargo handled by the nation’s air freight forwarders and accounted for two-thirds of their earnings. In 1969, Emery introduced EmCon, a pioneering computerized tracking system, following a $3 million investment in a 10-year computer lease with IBM. In November 1969, John Emery Sr. and co-founder Leonard Hunt both died.

In response to reduced air carrier routes in the early 1970s, Emery began an innovative cargo air service, departing from the use of certificated carriers and large airlines. It began using contracted air carriers and, in 1976, launched the Emery Air Force, a fleet of leased cargo planes. During this time, there were only few planes, Cessna Citations used primarily for overnight letter service through ta hub in Smyrna, Tennessee. By 1977, this fleet included 16 planes, growing to 66 leased aircraft by the end of 1979. A new hub was also opened in Dayton, Ohio.

=== Emery Worldwide (1981–2001) ===
Emery Air Freight was rebranded as Emery Worldwide in 1981. The company started acquiring its own aircraft and established Emery Worldwide Airlines. That year, it built a freight sortation "Superhub" in Dayton, Ohio, central to its North American distribution network. By 1983, Emery operated a fleet of 64 aircraft and was noted for offering the broadest range of services in the air freight industry, being the largest international forwarder of documents and packages.

In April 1987, Emery acquired Purolator Courier for $306 million, aiming to enhance its small package market presence. However, the integration of Purolator proved challenging, leading to substantial losses in 1988 and early 1989. In April 1989, Emery was acquired by Consolidated Freightways (CF) for $230 million and merged with CF’s air freight division to form Emery Worldwide, A CF Company.

CF struggled to reverse Emery’s financial difficulties, which led to CF’s first loss since 1961 and the resignation of its president in 1990. Arthur C. Bass, appointed to lead Emery, lasted less than six months, and was succeeded by W. Roger Curry, who managed to restore profitability by 1995. In 1996, CF rebranded as CNF Transportation Inc., and Emery became Emery Worldwide, A CNF Company.

Emery Worldwide Airlines faced safety violations, leading to the grounding of its planes on August 13, 2001, following an FAA investigation and the crash of Flight 17 on February 16, 2000. Emery’s cargo operations were subcontracted to other carriers, with no service disruption to customers.

=== Menlo Worldwide Forwarding (2001–2004) ===
Emery Worldwide was renamed Emery Forwarding in late 2001, and on January 1, 2004, the name was changed to Menlo Worldwide Forwarding. In October 2004, Menlo Worldwide Forwarding was sold to United Parcel Service (UPS) for $150 million in cash and the assumption of approximately $110 million in long-term debt.

== Notable shipments ==
- In 1969, an unlabeled crate containing the painting “Portrait of a Woman and a Musketeer” by Pablo Picasso, which was valued at $75,000 and was being shipped from Paris to Milwaukee, was removed from Emery’s facility in Boston by an employee who took it home with him, reportedly at the direction of his supervisor who wanted to reduce clutter on the dock. When the employee discovered what was in the crate, and realized that the FBI was investigating its apparent theft, he returned it anonymously to the Museum of Fine Arts in Boston. No one knew who took the painting, or who returned it, until 2023.
- In 1983, following baseball's infamous pine tar incident Emery shipped the bat back to its owner, Kansas City Royal slugger George Brett, after league President Lee McPhail ruled that a home run Brett had hit against the New York Yankees on July 24 counted even though there was too much pine tar on the bat.
- In 1988, a package addressed from University of Kentucky basketball assistant coach Dwane Casey to the father of basketball recruit Chris Mills reportedly came unsealed in transit, and several Emery employees said they found $1,000 in cash inside, prompting an NCAA investigation. Casey denied sending the package, and in 1990, Emery settled a $6.9 million lawsuit with Casey, who had sued for defamation.
