= AAR Corp. =

Aviation support company

AAR CORP.
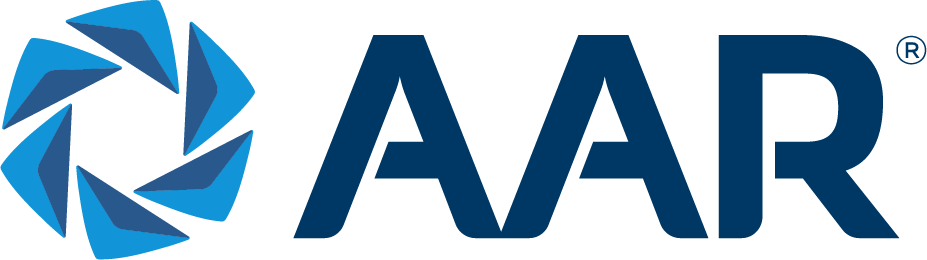
- Type: Public
- Traded as: NYSE: AIR; S&P 600 component
- Industry: Aviation
- Founded: 1955; 71 years ago
- Founder: Ira Allen Eichner
- Headquarters: Wood Dale, Illinois, United States
- Area served: Worldwide
- Key people: John Holmes (chairman, president and CEO)
- Revenue: ▲US$3.3 billion (FY26)
- Net income: ▲US$187.7 million (FY26)
- Total assets: ▲US$3.4 billion (FY26)
- Total equity: ▲US$1.7 billion (FY26)
- Number of employees: ▲7,100 (FY26)
- Website: aarcorp.com
- Footnotes; Financials as of fiscal year (FY) ended May 31, 2026. References

AAR CORP. is an American provider of aircraft maintenance services to commercial and government customers worldwide. The company is headquartered in Wood Dale, Illinois, a Chicago suburb. The company has about 7,000 employees, operating in 30 different countries. John Holmes is the incumbent CEO.

AAR sells both new and used parts and is one of the largest in the world for selling used parts. AAR has over $3 billion in revenue as of FY2026. As of January 2026, the company operates major maintenance facilities in Greensboro, North Carolina, Indianapolis (closing February 28, 2027), Lake City, Miami, Oklahoma City, and Rockford, Illinois as well as Trois Rivieres, Quebec and Windsor, Ontario in Canada.

== History ==
The company was founded by Ira Allen Eichner in 1951, to supply radios and other equipment to the commercial aviation industry. I.A. Allen Industrial was incorporated in 1955, renamed Allen Aircraft Radio (AAR) in 1962, and became AAR CORP. in 1970. Also, in 1969, AAR began its aircraft maintenance business in Oklahoma City. In 1965, AAR expanded to Europe and opened a Singapore office in 1982.

AAR organized its Aircraft Turbine Center, Inc. in 1979 after future CEO David P. Storch, Eichner's son-in-law, joined the company.

David P. Storch was CEO from 1996 to 2018. In 2018, John M. Holmes became CEO.

On November 3, 2025, AAR and HAECO Americas, with 1600 employees in Greensboro, North Carolina and Lake City, Florida, announced that AAR had purchased the HAECO subsidiary for $78 million. At the time, HAECO Americas was the second-largest heavy aircraft maintenance company in North America, with AAR being number one.

In December 2025, it was announced that AAR had entered into an agreement to acquire Aircraft Reconfig Technologies from ZIM Aircraft Cabin Solutions for US$35 million in an all-cash transaction. The acquisition was intended to expand AAR's engineering and certification capabilities within its repair and engineering segment and was subject to customary closing conditions and regulatory approvals. In late December 2025, it was announced that AAR would be permanently closing its Indianapolis location by February 28, 2027.

=== Lobbying and corruption ===
During the first Trump administration, AAR quadrupled its lobbying expenditures. The company spent large sums at Trump-owned properties with the intent to get Trump to view the company more favorably. From the time Trump took office until October 2020, AAR obtained 10 new federal contracts worth a total of $1.35 billion.

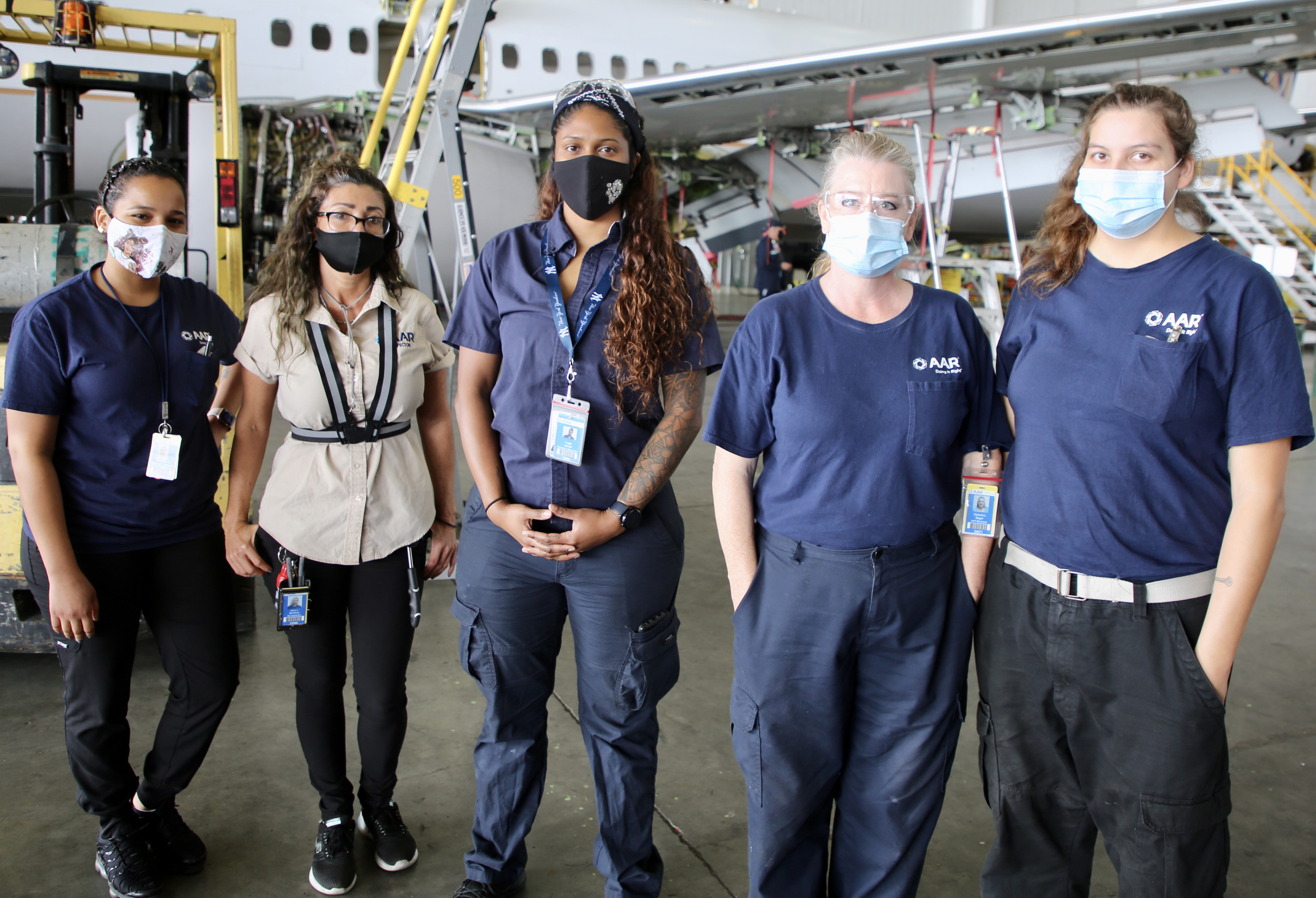
AAR trainees at the Miami airport

In December 2024, AAR agreed to resolve U.S. charges in connection with schemes to bribe Nepalese and South African officials related to contracts with state-owned flag carriers Nepal Airlines and South African Airways. AAR agreed to pay more than $55 million to resolve investigations done by the Justice Department and SEC.

== Business trends ==
The key trends for AAR are, as of the end of the fiscal year ending May 31 (in million US$ except per share data):

	FY26	FY25	FY24	FY23	FY22	FY21	FY20	FY19	FY18	FY17	FY16
Revenue	3,308.0	2,780.5	2,318.9	1,990.5	1,820.0	1,652.3	2,072.0	2,057.8	1,748.3	1,590.8	1,525.4
Net income	277.8	185.2	46.3	90.2	78.7	35.8	4.4	7.5	15.6	56.5	47.7
Total assets	3,355.9	2,844.6	2,770.0	1,097.9	1,007.2	1,539.7	2,079.0	1,517.2	1,524.7	1,504.1	1,456.0
Total equity	1,703.8	1,211.6	1,189.8	1,099.1	1,034.5	974.4	902.6	905.9	914.2	865.8	865.8
Earnings per share	4.86	0.35	1.29	2.55	2.19	1.31	0.71	2.40	2.11	1.51	1.30
Sources											

== See also ==
- List of S&P 600 companies
