= Zantop =

People commonly known by the family name Zantop include:

- Half and Susanne Zantop, victims in the 2001 Dartmouth College murders

Brothers named Zantop started three separate Michigan-based airlines:

- Zantop Air Transport (1946–1966) (originally Zantop Flying Service), a supplemental air carrier known for military charters and flying auto parts, sold to become Universal Airlines
- Zantop Airways (1968–1981), an air taxi or Part 298 (small aircraft) carrier, sold to become Orion Air
- Zantop International Airlines (1972–2005), known for flying auto parts and military charters
