= LCQ =

LCQ may refer to:

- Lake City Gateway Airport (Florida), US, IATA and FAA codes
- Legalise Cannabis Queensland, political party in Queensland, Australia
