= KLCQ =

KLCQ may refer to:

- KLCQ (FM), a radio station (88.5 FM) licensed to serve Durango, Colorado, United States
- Lake City Gateway Airport (ICAO code KLCQ)
