= TIMCO =

Former aerospace company

TIMCO Aviation Services Inc.
- Company type: Private
- Industry: Aerospace Aircraft MRO and Interiors
- Founded: 1990
- Defunct: 2014
- Fate: acquired by HAECO
- Successor: HAECO Americas
- Headquarters: Greensboro, North Carolina
- Key people: Kevin Carter - CEO
- Products: Aircraft Maintenance, Repair and Overhaul
- Number of employees: 2,260
- Website: www.timco.aero

TIMCO Aviation Services, Inc. (TIMCO) was a company that provided aircraft Maintenance, Repair and Overhaul (MRO) and interiors services for commercial and government aircraft operators.

The company's MRO services included airframe MRO for Boeing and Airbus fleets at TIMCO’s corporate complex in Greensboro, North Carolina, near Piedmont Triad International Airport (GSO) as well as at facilities in Macon, Georgia, and Lake City, Florida. The company also provided regional jet MRO at its dedicated facility at the Cincinnati Northern Kentucky International Airport (CVG) in Cincinnati, Ohio.

In 2014, the company was acquired by HAECO, a Hong Kong–based division of the British conglomerate Swire Group.

In 2025, the company was acquired by AAR Corp.

== History ==
TIMCO was created by a holding company called Primark and started operations in 1990. It was intended that TIMCO's foundation customer be Orion Air, a large contract freight airline, also a subsidiary of Primark, but Primark shut down Orion Air in 1989.

== Services ==
Through its TIMCO Aerosystems division, the company provided aircraft interiors design and certification services and manufactured interior fittings including seats, galleys and lavatories. Timco Aerosystems was the result of the acquisition of Brice Manufacturing by Timco Aviation Services in 2002

Prior to its acquisition by HAECO in 2014, TIMCO was one of the largest independent commercial jet MRO service providers in the world. The company supported airlines, leasing companies, and government with individually tailored aircraft care services. TIMCO ran structures and composites repair operations using composite and bonded aluminum honeycomb assemblies.

TIMCO's maintenance operations were also supported by an engine center in Oscoda, Michigan, and the company provided line maintenance operations at airports through the TIMCO LineCare network.
