= Hotel Blanche =

- U.S. National Register of Historic Places
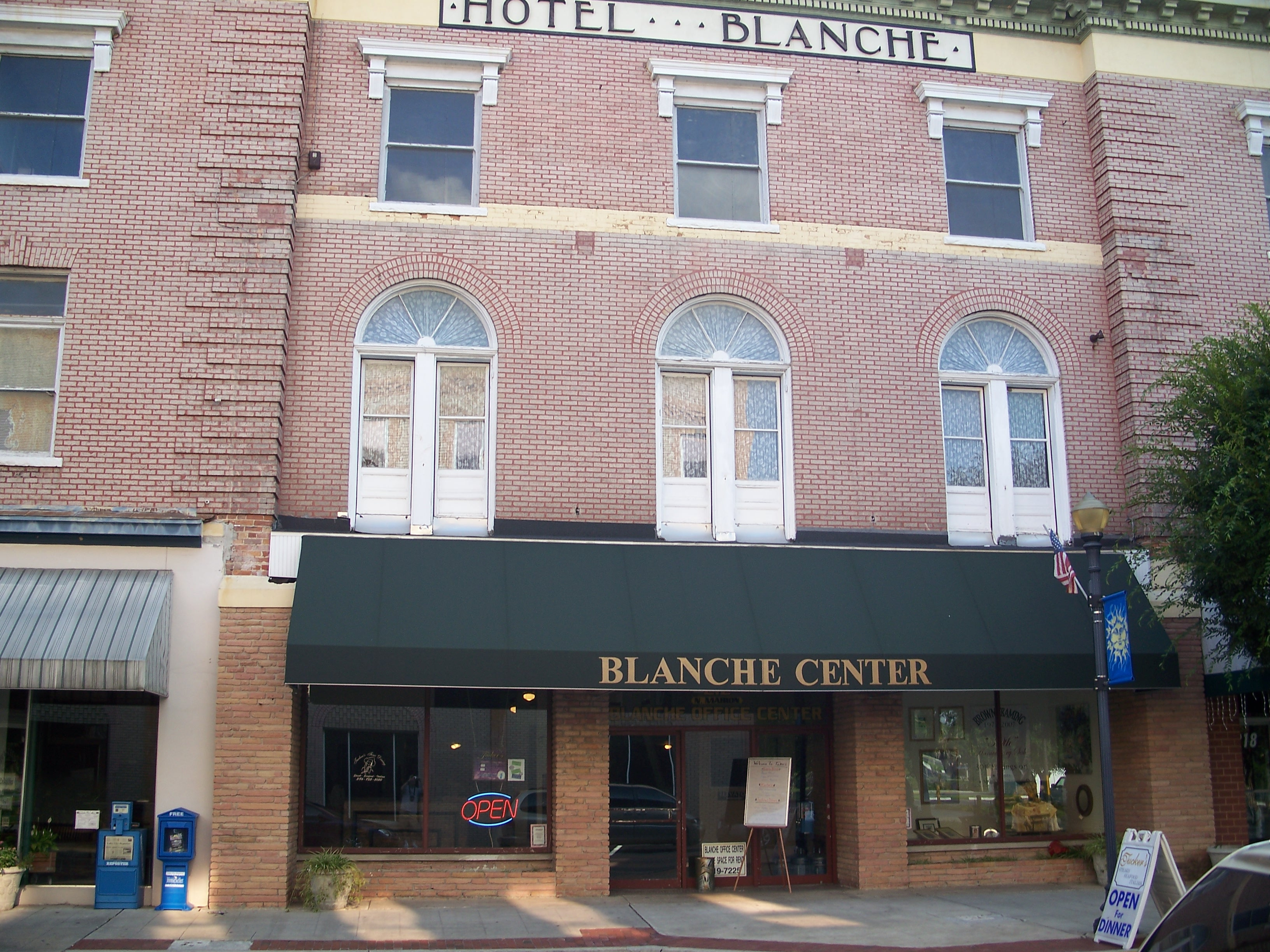
- The Blanche Hotel in 2007.
- Location: Lake City, Florida
- Coordinates: 30°11′27″N 82°38′16″W
- Built: 1902
- Architect: Frank Pierce Milburn, Henry W. Otis
- Architectural style: Masonry Eclectic
- NRHP reference No.: 89002320
- Added to NRHP: January 18, 1990

The Hotel Blanche (also known as the Blanche Hotel or The Blanche or Hancock Building) is a historic site in Lake City, Florida, United States. It is located at 212 North Marion Street. On January 18, 1990, it was added to the U.S. National Register of Historic Places.

== History ==
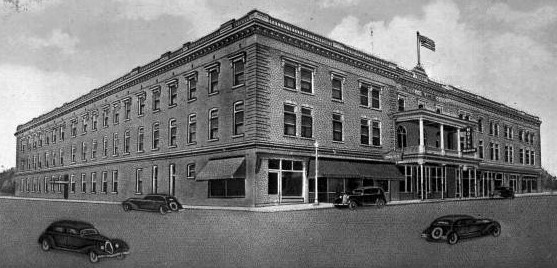
Hotel Blanche in 1943.

Hotel Blanche was constructed in 1902 by Frank Pierce Milburn. A south wing was added in 1925 and a north wing was added in 1926. In the lobby of the building is the oldest elevator in Florida. It is still functional but is currently blocked off. Because the hotel was situated near the intersection of US 41/441, US 90, the Southern Railway, Interstate 10 and Interstate 75 it would bring in wealthy guests traveling through Florida. Many notable guests have stayed at the hotel including Al Capone on his way from Chicago to Miami and Johnny Cash. The hotel closed in 1967 leaving it to house several offices and shops.

Starting in January 2018, Lake City began to renovate the Hotel Blanche. The project is expected to take 12–15 months, and all fixtures that are not historic are going to be demolished. Parts of the concrete elevator shaft have been removed from the hotel in the renovations. Originally, a portion of Marion Avenue was closed due to the construction, but it has since been reopened due to complaints from citizens as well as local businesses that were adversely effected by the closure.

== Gallery ==
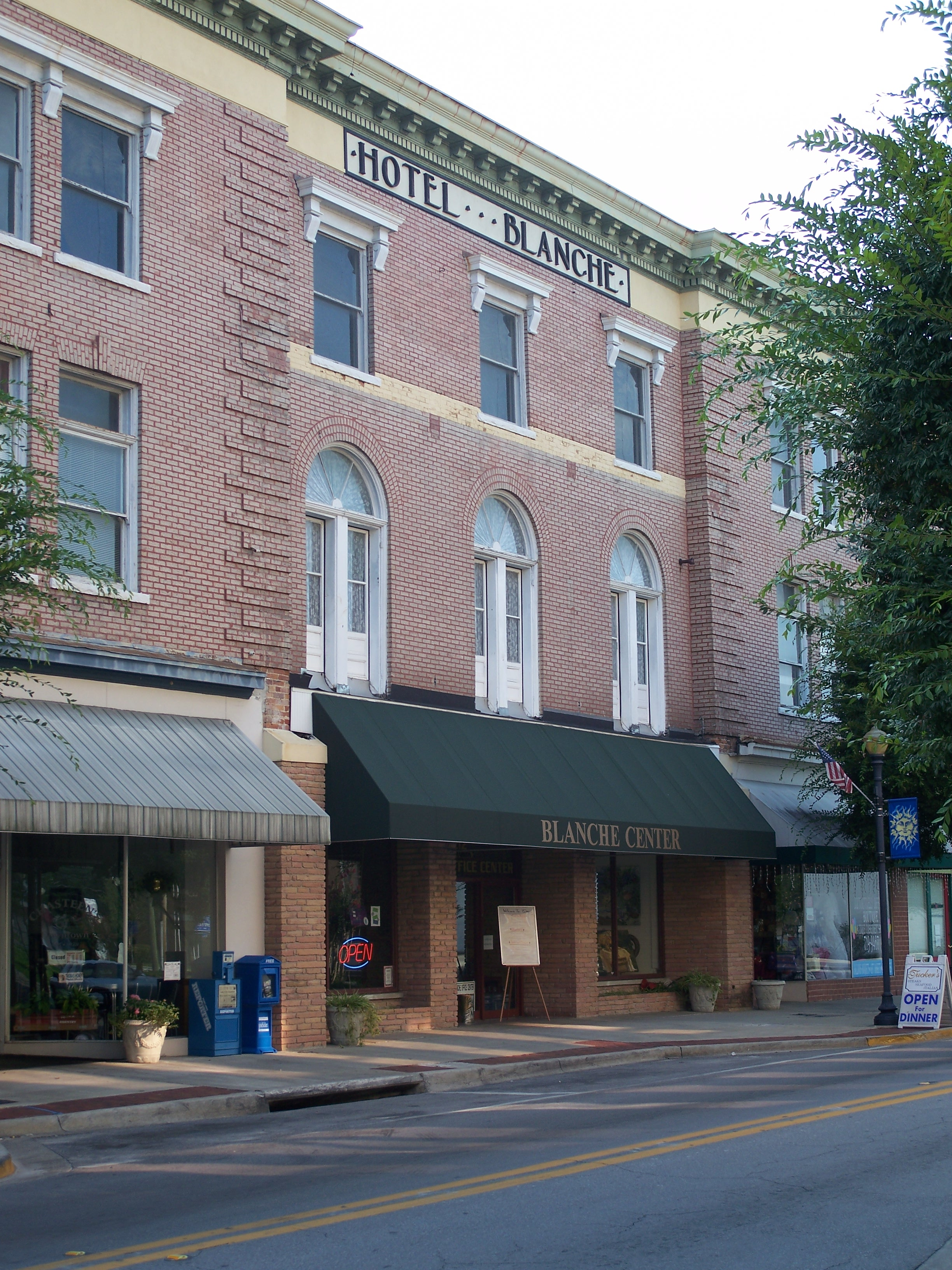

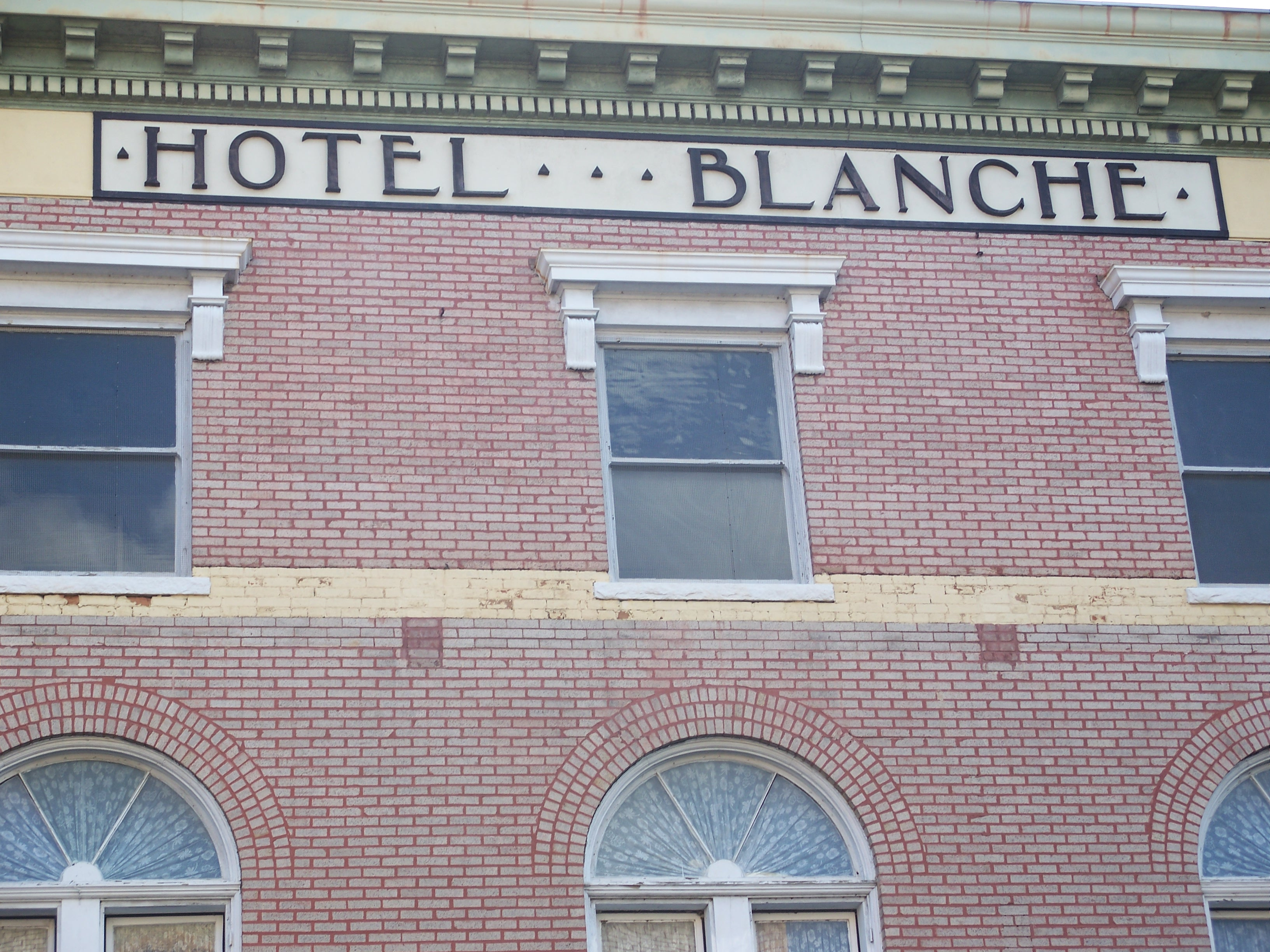

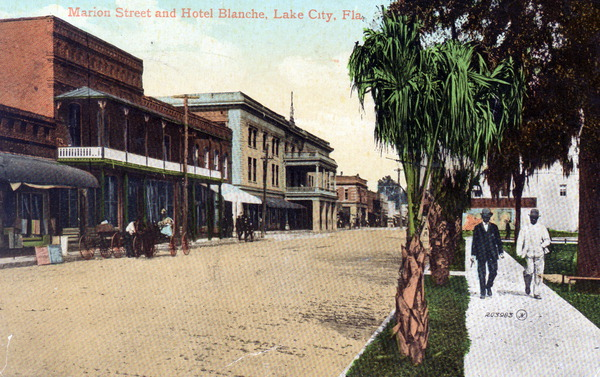
Postcard of Hotel Blanche and Marion St from 1908
