= Kitty Hawk Aircargo =

American cargo airline

IATA	ICAO	Call sign
KR	KHA	KITTYHAWK
- Founded: 1976; 50 years ago (as Kitty Hawk Airways)
- Commenced operations: 1985; 41 years ago
- Ceased operations: January 8, 2008; 18 years ago
- Hubs: Fort Wayne International Airport
- Fleet size: 14
- Parent company: Kitty Hawk Group
- Headquarters: Grapevine, Texas, U.S.
- Website: Kha.com

Kitty Hawk Aircargo was an American cargo airline based on the grounds of Dallas/Fort Worth International Airport and in Grapevine, Texas, U.S. It operated domestic scheduled overnight freight services, as well as air charter services. Its main base was Dallas-Fort Worth International Airport, with a hub at Fort Wayne International Airport.

== History ==
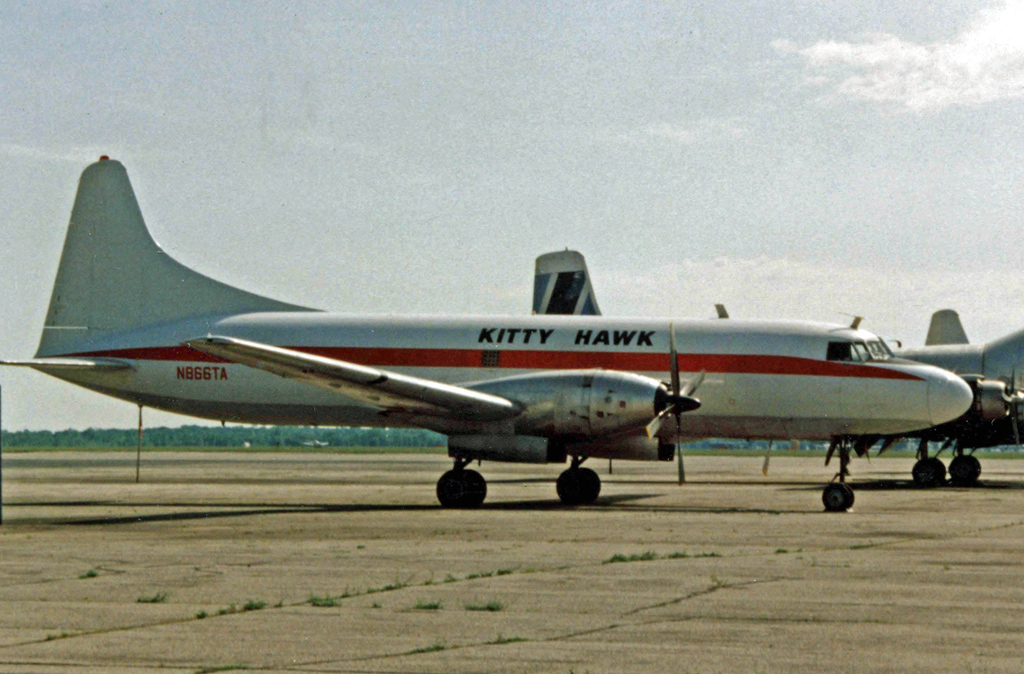
Convair 640 turboprop freighter of Kitty Hawk at Detroit's Willow Run Airport in 1992

The company's founder, M. Thomas Christopher, first got his start in the air transport industry in 1976, where as a member of Burlington Northern Airfreight, he volunteered to fly a plane of his own to help a client who had missed a flight. He would continue operating this side business beyond his eventual firing from Burlington in 1978, which led to him officially establishing the company as Christopher Charters, Inc. soon after. Christopher's one-plane business proved to be a success, with him later acquiring the Dallas-based charter company Kitty Hawk Airways in 1985; both companies merged that same year into the holding group Kitty Hawk, which then established two divisions, one as an air charter service, and the other for charter flights. Kitty Hawk was commended for its fast and reliable service, with it being listed among the fastest-growing companies per the Dallas 100 Awards in 1993.

Kitty Hawk Air Cargo originated with the small freight airline General Aviation, which was sold to Kitty Hawk Group in 1988.

=== Bankruptcies ===
Financial issues plagued Kitty Hawk, Inc. in the spring of 2000, with maintenance issues and operation costs inciting the need for restructuring. On April 20, the company announced its decision to remove founder Christopher as its CEO. On May 1, the company filed for Chapter 11 bankruptcy protection. After months of reorganization in court, Kitty Hawk, Inc. was released from bankruptcy protection on August 5, 2002, and resumed operations weeks later, relieved from debt.

On October 15, 2007, Kitty Hawk, Inc. filed again for Chapter 11 bankruptcy amidst a decrease in demand and heightened operation costs. On October 29, Kitty Hawk, Inc. announced it would cease all scheduled network air and ground operations, laying off 500 employees in the process. It continued to operate air cargo charter shipments throughout the rest of the year.

On November 20, 2007, Kitty Hawk Air Cargo began flying for DHL for a two-week minimum, shipping DHL's freight domestically. This contract was for five Boeing 737-300s, including keeping one at DHL's hub as a backup. Kitty Hawk continued this flying for four weeks.

Kitty Hawk flew its last revenue flight, a Boeing 727 horse charter, on January 8, 2008, and its last ever flight the next day, ferrying the aircraft to Ardmore, Oklahoma.

== Destinations ==
- Overnight cargo services were operated daily to the following domestic destinations: Atlanta, Austin, Baltimore, Boston, Buffalo, Charlotte, Chicago, Cincinnati, Cleveland, Columbus, Dallas/Ft Worth, Dayton, Denver, Detroit, El Paso, Fort Wayne, Grand Rapids, Hartford, Honolulu, Houston, Indianapolis, Jacksonville, Kansas City, Lexington, Las Vegas, Lexington, Los Angeles, Louisville, Memphis, Miami, Milwaukee, Minneapolis/St Paul, Nashville, New York, Newark, Norfolk, Oakland, Omaha, Orlando, Philadelphia, Phoenix, Pittsburgh, Portland, Raleigh, Richmond, St. Louis, Salt Lake City, San Diego, San Francisco, Seattle, South Bend, Tampa, and Washington, DC.
- Freight services were operated to the following international destinations: San Juan, Puerto Rico and Toronto, Canada.
- Additional interline partners used to service the following destinations: Anchorage and Honolulu.

== Fleet ==
As of December 2007 the Kitty Hawk Aircargo fleet included:

Kitty Hawk Aircargo Fleet
Aircraft	Total	Notes
Boeing 737-300SF	7
Boeing 727-200	7

As of November 17, 2007, the majority of the 727s (including N728US) from the Kitty Hawk fleet were being stored at Ardmore Municipal Airport in Ardmore, Oklahoma.

=== Previously operated ===
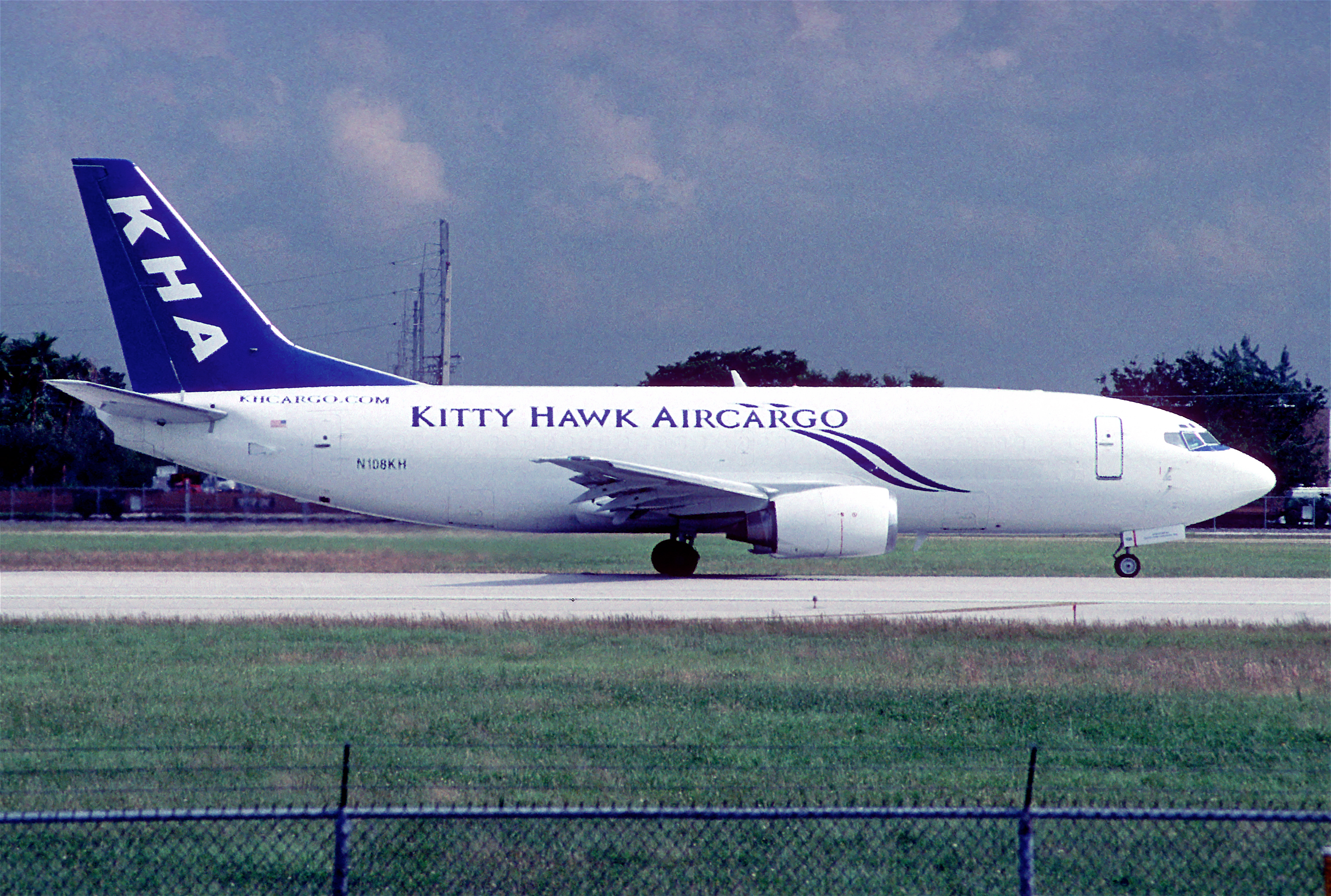
Kitty Hawk Air Cargo Boeing 737-300F

As of March 2006 the airline operated:

- 18 Boeing 727-200F
- 7 Boeing 737-300SF
- 7 Convair 640
- 3 Lockheed L-1011F

== See also ==
- List of defunct airlines of the United States
