= Martha Mier =

American pianist (born 1936)

- Born: December 10, 1936 (age 89)
- Education: Florida State University
- Occupations: Composer and Piano teacher

Martha Mier is an American composer and retired independent piano teacher. Nowadays she resides in Lake City, Florida, where she moved after graduating with honors from Florida State University. She is known for composing the Jazz, Rags and Blues series for Alfred music. Many of her works appear in Canada's Royal Conservatory of Music and Conservatory Canada examination syllabi. She is also renowned for her "Romantic Impressions" solo piano books, which contain pieces for beginners to advanced players alike.

Aside from her skills and duties composing and teaching, she is a member of the Music Teachers' National Association, the Florida State Music Teachers' Association and the National Guild of Piano teachers. She is internationally recognized as a composer, teacher and arranger. She also takes part in many competitions in Florida as an adjudicator.

== Songbooks ==
Her songbooks are published at Alfred Music and are listed here in alphabetical order by title, followed by their level of difficulty and succeeded by their item number:

== Works ==
Her works, apart from her songbooks, are also published at Alfred Music and are listed here under their level of difficulty, followed by their title in alphabetical order and succeeded by their item number:

Piano solo

Early Elementary

- Abracadabra! (00-6117)
- Belle, the Bashful Butterfly (00-17592)
- Bright Painted Ponies (00-PA02351)
- Charlie's Adventure (00-22473)
- The Chocolate Song (00-6178)
- Fuzzy Baby Bird (00-3662)
- Fuzzy Wuzzy Worm (00-6193)
- Gentle Mountain Stream (00-24467)
- Gold Doubloons (00-6114)
- The Golden Trumpet (00-6100)
- King of the Jungle (00-22489)
- Medieval Castle (00-21357)
- Nothin' to Do Blues (00-22438)
- P-I-N-K! (00-6119)
- A Quiet Walk (00-6124)
- Rainbow Colors (00-6194)
- Witch on a Super-Speed Broom (00-8409)

Elementary

- Bouree and Musette (00-18138)
- Bumblebee Blues (00-19732)
- Camilla the Camel (00-12877)
- Ceremonial Dance (00-14696)
- Computer Talk (00-36161)
- Creepy Creaky Sounds (00-18191)
- The Donkey's Serenade (00-3664)
- Frog on a Log (00-18132)
- The Hiccup Song (00-17039)
- Katie Cricket (00-22397)
- Ladybug Boogie (00-5498)
- Lucky Ol' Cowboy (00-18143)
- March of the Gnomes (00-14255)
- Midnight Shadows (00-18519)
- Moonbeam Waltz (00-43023)
- A Mysterious Night (00-44294)
- Nate's Up to Bat (00-26289)
- Penguin Patrol (00-14202)
- Sir Cabot (00-18167)
- The Sleepy Cat (00-3663)
- Swingin' and Swayin' (00-14276)
- Way Down South (00-14254)
- Who Has Seen the Wind? (00-17028)

Late Elementary

- Black Cat's Recital (00-17580)
- Busy Fingers (00-19761)
- Chattanooga Blues (00-21335)
- Eagle Dance (00-19742)
- Feelin' Blue (00-5430)
- Firefly Waltz (00-18536)
- Green Dragonflies (00-6650)
- Halloween Shadows (00-39665)
- Interlude
- Ladybug Lullaby (00-19683)
- Little Black Cat (00-3681)
- Mystery at Blackwater Creek (00-31958)
- Pastel Clouds (00-29132)
- Slightly Blue (00-14722)
- Swaying Willow Trees (00-18983)
- Taco Rock (00-3653)
- Tambourine Dance (00-25923)
- Thistles in the Wind (00-6649)

Early Intermediate

- Andalusian Adventure (00-28197)
- Appaloosa Pony (00-3654)
- Arabian Tale (00-25473)
- Copper Penny Rag (00-20757)
- Cotton Candy Waltz (00-3682)
- Fiddle Tune (00-3622)
- Frontier Frolic (00-19704)
- Gathering Wildflowers (00-5494)
- Harvest Festival (00-38997)
- Jack-O'-Lantern Jamboree (00-14234)
- Jazzy Little Ragtime (00-37104)
- Lady Brittany's Ballad (00-5428)
- Misty Morning (00-41284)
- Peppermint Rag (00-14264)
- Petite Gavotte (00-12883)
- Riverboat Jazz (00-34304)
- Seafarer's Sonatina (00-5462)
- Starry Night Sonatina (00-32430)
- Summer Rain (00-17597)
- Taco Fiesta (00-27600)
- Treasured Moments (00-21316)

Intermediate

- Arkansas Suite (00-20781)
- Autumn Glow (00-3683)
- Baroque Swirls (00-3651)
- Caprice (00-24189)
- Dance of the Scarecrow (00-3688)
- Festival Fanfare (00-22462)
- Florida Reflections (00-22394)
- Fountain of Dreams (00-5481)
- Golden Reflections (00-19778)
- Indian Serenade (00-3652)
- Jazzin' Jesse (00-19756)
- Megan's Song (00-5475)
- Melissa's Melody (00-18767)
- Misty Falls (00-30587)
- Muddy Shoes Blues (00-20749)
- Polynesian Breeze (00-17045)
- Ragtime Charlie (00-3623)
- Reflections of the Heart (00-18531)
- Waltz in B Minor (00-17075)
- Whistlin' Joe (00-3650)
- Winter Starlight (00-14243)

Late Intermediate

- Autumn Nocturne (00-18189)
- The Bluegrass State (00-31815)
- Excursions for right hand alone (00-22469)
- Jazzin' Around (00-3689)
- Louisiana Legacies (00-27028)
- Rhapsody (for left hand alone) (00-18996)
- The Shepherd's Reverie (00-17034)
- Sunshine Jamboree (00-22415)
- Tennessee Treasures (00-34422)
- West Virginia: The Mountain State (00-38797)

Early Advanced

- Celebration Scherzo (00-19688)

Piano duet

Early Intermediate

- Blue Parrot Rag for one piano, four hands (00-17051)
- Gypsy Celebration for two pianos, four hands (00-5447)
- Santa Fe Sunset for one piano, four hands (00-18155)

Intermediate

- Carousel Waltz for two pianos, four hands (00-18160)
- Concerto in Classical Style for two pianos, four hands (00-20726)
- Jazz Debonaire for one piano, four hands (00-37367)
- Mexican Holiday for two pianos, four hands (00-11712)
- Otter Creek Stomp for one piano, four hands (00-22518)
- Stairway of Dreams for two pianos, four hands (00-14763)
- A Star-Spangled Celebration for Two for one piano, four hands (00-20775)
- Syncopated Sam for two pianos, four hands (00-21353)
- Upside-down Tango for one piano, four hands (00-31930)
- Downtown Blues for one piano, four hands

Piano Trio

- Agent 003 for one piano, six hands, Late Elementary (00-19785)
