= Lake City Gateway Airport =

Airport in Florida, U.S.

- IATA: LCQ; ICAO: KLCQ; FAA LID: LCQ

Summary
- Airport type: Public
- Owner: City of Lake City
- Serves: Lake City, Florida
- Elevation AMSL: 201 ft / 61 m
- Coordinates: 30°10′55″N 082°34′37″W
- Website: LakeCityMunicipalFBO.com

Map
- Location of airport in Florida LCQ (the United States)

Runways
| Direction | Length | | Surface |
| Direction | ft | m | Surface |
|---|---|---|---|
| 10/28 | 8,003 | 2,439 | Asphalt |
| 5/23 | 4,000 | 1,219 | Asphalt |

Statistics (2009)
- Aircraft operations: 28,714
- Based aircraft: 33
- Source: Federal Aviation Administration

Lake City Gateway Airport (IATA: LCQ, ICAO: KLCQ, FAA LID: LCQ) is a city-owned, public-use airport located three nautical miles (6 km) east of the central business district of Lake City, in Columbia County, Florida, United States. Formerly known as Lake City Municipal Airport, it is included in the National Plan of Integrated Airport Systems for 2011–2015, which categorized it as a general aviation facility.

== History ==
=== NAS Lake City ===
The airport was initially built in the early 1930s by the Lake City Flying Club, and acquired by the U.S. Navy during World War II to facilitate pilot training and named Naval Air Station Lake City and commissioned in December 1942, as NAS Lake City. Established as one of several support facilities to NAS Jacksonville, NAS Lake City was used to train U.S. Navy and U.S. Marine Corps pilots in land-based PV-1 Venturas and PV-2 Harpoons. Maximum complement at the air station reached 290 officers and 1,150 enlisted personnel. As many as 200 additional officer and enlisted WAVES were stationed at NAS Lake City later in the war and served in air traffic control, meteorological services, administrative support, and aircraft maintenance. Regular military operations terminated in March 1946 and NAS Lake City was decommissioned as an active naval air station.

=== Lake City Municipal Airport ===
The NAS Lake City property was deemed surplus and subsequently conveyed to the city of Lake City by the War Assets Administration (WAA) and renamed Lake City Municipal Airport. One of the first major tenants was Aero Corporation, which occupied the vacated military hangars and maintenance facilities, performing aircraft modification and rehabilitation during the 1960s, 1970s and 1980s, mostly U.S. military contracts supporting C-130 Hercules and P-3 Orion aircraft. Aero Corporation was subsequently acquired by TIMCO, which was then acquired by Hong Kong Aircraft Engineering Company Limited (HAECO), privately owned by Swire Pacific, which performs depot level maintenance on Boeing and Airbus commercial aircraft.

=== Lake City Gateway Airport ===
In 2011, the airport completed construction of a new 6,000-square foot, fixed-base operations, terminal facility to support business jets and general aviation aircraft operators. In addition, the airport was renamed Lake City Gateway Airport.

== Facilities and aircraft ==
Lake City Gateway Airport (LCQ) covers an area of 1,250 acres (506 ha) at an elevation of 201 feet (61 m) above mean sea level. It has two asphalt paved runways: 10/28 is 8,003 by 150 feet (2,439 x 46 m) and 5/23 is 4,000 by 75 feet (1,219 x 23 m).

For the 12-month period ending September 8, 2009, the airport had 28,714 aircraft operations, an average of 78 per day: 86% general aviation, 9% military, and 5% air taxi. At that time there were 33 aircraft based at this airport: 67% single-engine, 18% multi-engine, 9% jet, and 6% helicopter.

With its long main runway (8,003 feet), operational Non-Federal Air Traffic Control Tower, minimal air traffic, and land to develop, the airport is ideal for Maintenance, Repair, and Overhaul (MRO) facilities.

The airport supports MRO facilities, such as the Aero Corporation starting in 1961, which was acquired by TIMCO Aviation Services in late 1990s and was acquired in February 2014 by HAECO. HAECO modifies and repairs large aircraft, such as commercial Boeing 727, Boeing 737 and various Airbus airliners, as well as military C-130 Hercules and P-3 Orion aircraft for US military and US civilian operators, as well as overseas military and civilian customers.

United States Department of Agriculture operates an Air Tanker Base at LCQ that supports the suppression of wildfires in the southeast regions of the United States.

Med Trans is based at LCQ and operates a helicopter air ambulance service for the North Central Florida area.

== See also ==
- List of airports in Florida
