= Lake City, Florida =

City in Florida, United States

- City
- City of Lake City
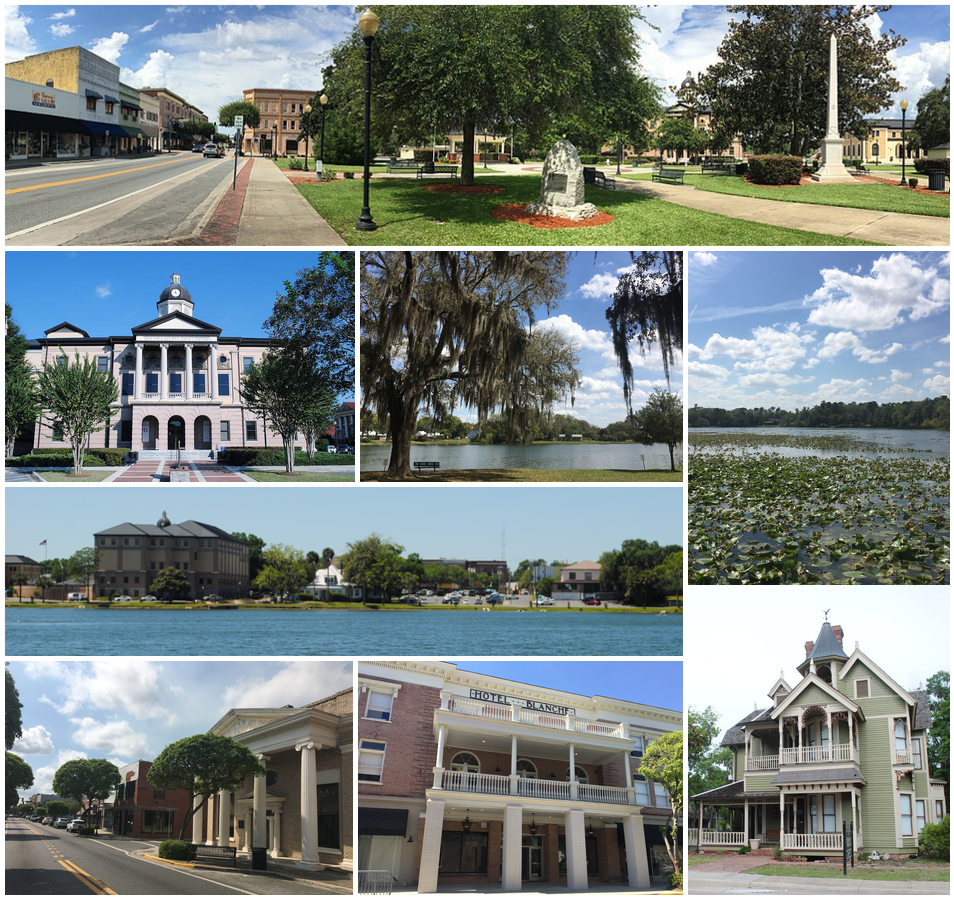
- Top, left to right: Downtown Lake City, Columbia County Courthouse, Lake Isabella, Lake Montgomery, Lake DeSoto, 1912 Columbia County Bank building, Hotel Blanche, T. G. Henderson House

- Logo
- Nickname: The Gateway to Florida
- Location in Columbia County and the state of Florida

- Location within Florida Location within the United States
- Coordinates: 30°10′20″N 82°37′30″W
- Country: United States
- State: Florida
- County: Columbia
- Settled: 1821
- Incorporated: 1859

Government
  - Type: Council-Manager

Area
  - City: 12.25 sq mi (31.73 km^{2})
  - Land: 11.85 sq mi (30.69 km^{2})
  - Water: 0.40 sq mi (1.04 km^{2}) 3.20%
- Elevation: 194 ft (59 m)

Population (2020)
  - City: 12,329
  - Density: 1,040.6/sq mi (401.79/km^{2})
  - Metro: 67,531
- Time zone: UTC−5 (EST)
  - Summer (DST): UTC−4 (EDT)
- ZIP code: 32024-32025, 32055-32056
- Area code: 386
- FIPS code: 12-37775
- GNIS feature ID: 2404863
- Website: www.lcfla.com

Lake City is a city in and the county seat of Columbia County, Florida, United States. As of the 2020 census, the city's population was 12,329, up from 12,046 at the 2010 census. It is the principal city of the Lake City Micropolitan Statistical Area, composed of Columbia County, as well as a principal city of the Gainesville metropolitan area, Florida. Lake City is 60 miles west of Jacksonville. Lake City has the moniker The Gateway to Florida because it is adjacent to the intersection of Interstate 75 and Interstate 10.

== History ==
=== Timucua and Spanish Florida ===
In 1539, Hernando de Soto and his Spanish expedition arrived in Tampa Bay. The de Soto expedition proceeded north from Tampa Bay looking for gold. His expedition met a large Native American group called the northern Utina, possibly near present-day Lake City, who were part of the western Timucua people. Some northern Utina were led by powerful chiefs. In the 17th century Spanish missionaries established missions in this area, west of the site of present-day Lake City. Called Santa Cruz de Tarihica, it was used by the Spanish to develop agriculture and bring Native Americans within their sphere.

=== Alligator ===
In the 18th century, a Seminole community called Halapata Telofa (also spelled Alapata Telophka) occupied this area, which translated into English, was "Alligator Town". Historians do not know when it was established, but its existence was documented by the US Army in 1821. A February 1821 report, by Captain John H. Bell, mentions that the mico (chief) of Alligator Town had recently died and missed a gathering of chiefs. The most famous resident of Alligator Town was Halpatter Tustenuggee ("Alligator Warrior"), also known as Chief Alligator. He led Seminole warriors in the Second Seminole War (1835–1842) to resist their people's relocation to the Arkansas Territory (now known as Oklahoma).

After Florida became the Florida Territory of the United States in 1821, American settlers formed their own settlement adjacent to Alligator Village and called it Alligator. Following the 1823 Treaty of Moultrie Creek, the residents of Alligator Village relocated to the banks of the Peace River (Peas Creek) in the newly established Seminole reservation, leaving Alligator Town. When Columbia County was formed in 1832 from Duval and Alachua counties, Alligator was designated as the seat of the county government.

During the Second Seminole War, several forts were established in the area, including Fort White on the Santa Fe River, and Fort Alligator, also called Fort Lancaster, in present-day downtown Lake City. By 1845, the last of the Seminole left the area of present-day Lake City or were forcibly removed by the US Army.

In 1847, Company C of the Florida Volunteers, which was composed of Lake City members, served in the Mexican–American War.

In November 1858, a railroad was completed connecting Jacksonville to Alligator, which opened the town to more commerce and passenger traffic. Alligator Town was incorporated and its name changed to Lake City in 1859; M. Whit Smith was elected as the town's first mayor. According to an urban legend, the name was changed because the mayor's wife Martha Jane, who had recently moved to the town, refused to hang her lace curtains in a town named Alligator.

=== Civil War ===
During the American Civil War the railroad between Lake City and Jacksonville was used to send beef and salt to Confederate soldiers. During the summer of 1862, the 8th Florida Infantry Regiment was mustered in at Lake City. The unit was soon deployed to Virginia and fought as part of the Army of Northern Virginia.

In February 1864, Union troops under Truman Seymour advanced west from Jacksonville. His objective was to disrupt Confederate supplies, and obtain African-American recruits and supplies. Confederate General Joseph Finnegan assembled troops and called for reinforcements from P. G. T. Beauregard in response to the Union threat. On February 11, 1864, Finnegan's troops defeated a Union cavalry raid in Lake City. After the Union cavalry was repulsed, Finnegan moved his forces to Olustee Station about ten miles east of Lake City. The Confederate presence at Olustee Station was reinforced to prepare for the Union troops coming from Jacksonville.

Union forces engaged the Confederates at the Battle of Olustee on February 20, 1864, near the Olustee Station. It was the only major battle in Florida during the war. Union casualties were 1,861 men killed, wounded or missing; Confederate casualties were 946 killed, wounded or missing. The Confederate dead were buried in Lake City. In 1928 a memorial for the battle was established in downtown Lake City.

The Civil War badly damaged Florida's railroads, including the Florida, Atlantic and Gulf Central Railroad. The railroad was rebuilt by carpetbagger George William Swepson and was renamed the Florida Central Railroad in 1868. In 1869, the Pensacola and Georgia Railroad was merged with a railroad from Jacksonville to Lake City to form the Jacksonville, Pensacola and Mobile Railroad.

=== 1874–1949 ===
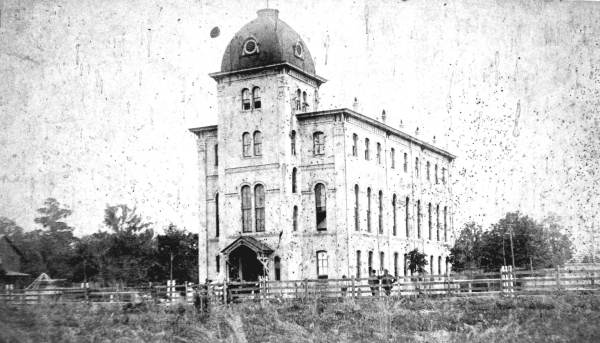
Florida Agricultural College in the late 1880s

In 1874, a fire destroyed most of the wooden buildings in Lake City. That same year, Lake City's first newspaper, the Lake City Reporter, was published. In 1876, the Bigelow Building was completed; it later was adapted for use as the City Hall. In 1891, Lake City became the first city in Florida to have electric lights from a local power and light company.

By the early 20th century, Lake City had become an important railroad junction, served by the Seaboard Air Line, Atlantic Coast Line, and Georgia Southern and Florida Railroad. Hotel Blanche was built in 1902 as an attraction for expected tourists. The hotel was Lake City and Columbia County's major hotel and central business center from 1902 to 1955. The population of Lake City in 1900 was 4,013; in 1905 was 6,509; and 1910 was 5,032.

Florida Agricultural College was established as a land grant college in 1884 as part of the Morrill Land Grant Act; in 1904 it became a full university with 25 instructors. In 1905 the Florida Agricultural College was moved to Gainesville in accordance with the Buckman Act, becoming part of the University of Florida. Columbia High School constructed a second building in 1906 that was used until 1922. In 1907, Lake City officials leased the former property of the Florida Agricultural College to the Florida Baptist Convention; they founded Columbia College, a Baptist college. It lasted for ten years until overwhelmed with debt. Columbia College deeded the land and buildings back to Lake City in 1919. During World War I, the campus was used as a training site for local troops. The facility was adapted for use as US Hospital No. 63, the predecessor of the Veterans Hospital constructed in Lake City. More than 34 Lake City soldiers were killed in World War I.

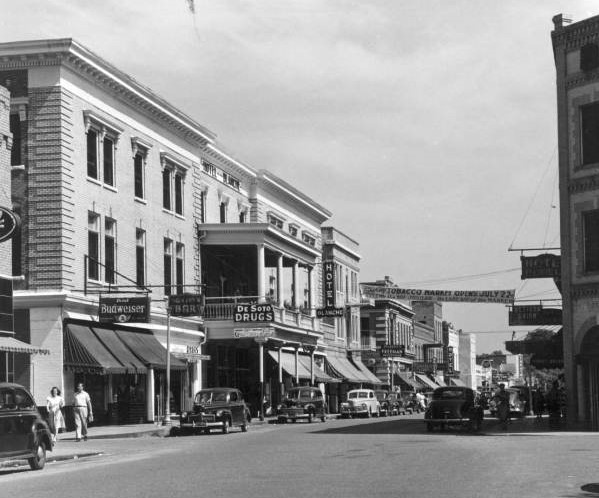
Marion Street in 1948

In 1940, the population of Lake City was 5,836. During World War II, a number of institutions were established to help with the war effort as well as those in Lake City. The Lake Shore Hospital was dedicated in 1940 to provide medical care for those in the Lake City area. The Lake City Woman's Club became the United Service Organizations (USO) headquarters to entertain service personnel stationed in Lake City. Naval Air Station Lake City was commissioned in 1942 on the site of the Lake City Flying Club air field. NAS Lake City was a support facility for Naval Air Station Jacksonville and trained pilots to fly the Lockheed Ventura. Military operations at NAS Lake City ended in March 1946, and it was decommissioned as an active naval air station.

After World War II a local air base was converted for use in 1947 as the Columbia Forestry School. The Columbia Forestry School had low enrollments and funds, forcing the school to seek help from the Florida legislature. The University of Florida assumed management of the school, and in 1950 it became the University of Florida Forest Ranger School. As part of the network of community colleges established in Florida, the school became the Lake City Junior College and Forest Ranger School in 1962. Lake City Junior College was renamed to Lake City Community College in 1970; in 2010, it was renamed as Florida Gateway College.

=== 1950— ===
By 1950, the population of Lake City was 7,571. The forestry products industry (turpentine, lumber, and pulpwood) had become a mainstay of the local economy. During the Korean War, five Lake City soldiers were killed. A monument was dedicated in 1985 in their honor and memory. In 1958, the Columbia Amateur Radio Society was formed by a group of amateur radio operators who enjoyed the ability to communicate worldwide. This radio club continues to exist. Lake City's centennial was celebrated in 1959 with parades, fireworks, and A Century in the Sun, a 58-page book documenting 100 years of progress. The citizens of the town dressed in period attire, complete with whiskers. A good-natured clash arose between the men with additional facial hair and the women who did not like it.

In 1963, Interstate 75 and Interstate 10 were opened, intersecting at Lake City. In the 1960s, Columbia County schools were not desegregated. In 1970, a judge ordered all Columbia County public schools to integrate. During the Vietnam War, 23 local Lake City soldiers were either killed or missing in action (M.I.A.).

In 1978, the Columbia County Public Library was established. Downtown Lake City was revitalized in the 1990s with new businesses, shops, and restaurants. In 2000, Lake City had a population of 9,980. The city's sesquicentennial was held in 2009.

On 10 June 2019, Lake City was hit by a cyber ransomware attack that rendered many of the city's communication systems inoperative. On 25 June 2019, the City's insurance company, the Florida League of Cities, paid 42 bitcoins—over US$480,000—for a mechanism to retrieve the City's files and data.

== Geography ==
Lake City is located in northern Florida near the intersection of Interstate 10 and Interstate 75. Jacksonville is 60 mi (97 km) to the east, Tallahassee is 106 mi (171 km) to the west, Gainesville is 46 mi (74 km) to the south, and Valdosta, Georgia, is 62 mi (100 km) to the northwest.

According to the United States Census Bureau, Lake City has a total area of 12.4 square miles (32.2 km^{2}), of which 12.0 square miles (31.1 km^{2}) is land, and 0.39 square miles (1.0 km^{2}) or 3.20%, is water.

=== Climate ===
Lake City is part of the humid subtropical climate zone of the Southeastern United States. Due to its latitude and relative position north of Florida's peninsula it is subject at times to continental conditions, which cause rare cold snaps that may affect sensitive winter crops. The hottest temperature ever recorded in the city was 106 °F (41 °C) on June 4, 1918, and the coldest temperature ever recorded was 6 °F (−14 °C) on February 13, 1899.

Climate data for Lake City, Florida, 1991–2020 normals, extremes 1892–present
Month	Jan	Feb	Mar	Apr	May	Jun	Jul	Aug	Sep	Oct	Nov	Dec	Year
Record high °F (°C)	90 (32)	89 (32)	94 (34)	96 (36)	101 (38)	106 (41)	102 (39)	104 (40)	101 (38)	96 (36)	91 (33)	91 (33)	106 (41)
Mean maximum °F (°C)	79.3 (26.3)	81.8 (27.7)	85.1 (29.5)	89.2 (31.8)	93.9 (34.4)	96.8 (36.0)	96.7 (35.9)	95.5 (35.3)	93.1 (33.9)	89.0 (31.7)	84.3 (29.1)	80.4 (26.9)	97.9 (36.6)
Mean daily maximum °F (°C)	63.2 (17.3)	67.0 (19.4)	73.1 (22.8)	78.7 (25.9)	85.2 (29.6)	88.3 (31.3)	89.7 (32.1)	88.8 (31.6)	86.0 (30.0)	79.4 (26.3)	71.3 (21.8)	65.5 (18.6)	78.0 (25.6)
Daily mean °F (°C)	52.1 (11.2)	55.5 (13.1)	60.8 (16.0)	66.6 (19.2)	73.4 (23.0)	78.2 (25.7)	80.0 (26.7)	79.6 (26.4)	76.6 (24.8)	69.0 (20.6)	60.2 (15.7)	54.5 (12.5)	67.2 (19.6)
Mean daily minimum °F (°C)	40.9 (4.9)	44.0 (6.7)	48.6 (9.2)	54.5 (12.5)	61.6 (16.4)	68.1 (20.1)	70.3 (21.3)	70.4 (21.3)	67.3 (19.6)	58.6 (14.8)	49.1 (9.5)	43.5 (6.4)	56.4 (13.6)
Mean minimum °F (°C)	25.1 (−3.8)	28.4 (−2.0)	33.9 (1.1)	42.2 (5.7)	51.6 (10.9)	63.2 (17.3)	67.2 (19.6)	67.6 (19.8)	60.4 (15.8)	44.7 (7.1)	33.2 (0.7)	28.6 (−1.9)	23.3 (−4.8)
Record low °F (°C)	7 (−14)	6 (−14)	19 (−7)	33 (1)	41 (5)	49 (9)	57 (14)	59 (15)	44 (7)	32 (0)	18 (−8)	9 (−13)	6 (−14)
Average precipitation inches (mm)	4.27 (108)	3.23 (82)	4.29 (109)	3.55 (90)	3.47 (88)	7.55 (192)	7.16 (182)	7.28 (185)	5.86 (149)	2.50 (64)	1.91 (49)	2.91 (74)	53.98 (1,371)
Average precipitation days (≥ 0.01 in)	11.2	9.0	9.0	7.4	7.0	14.7	15.7	17.0	11.5	8.3	7.4	9.9	128.1
Source: NOAA

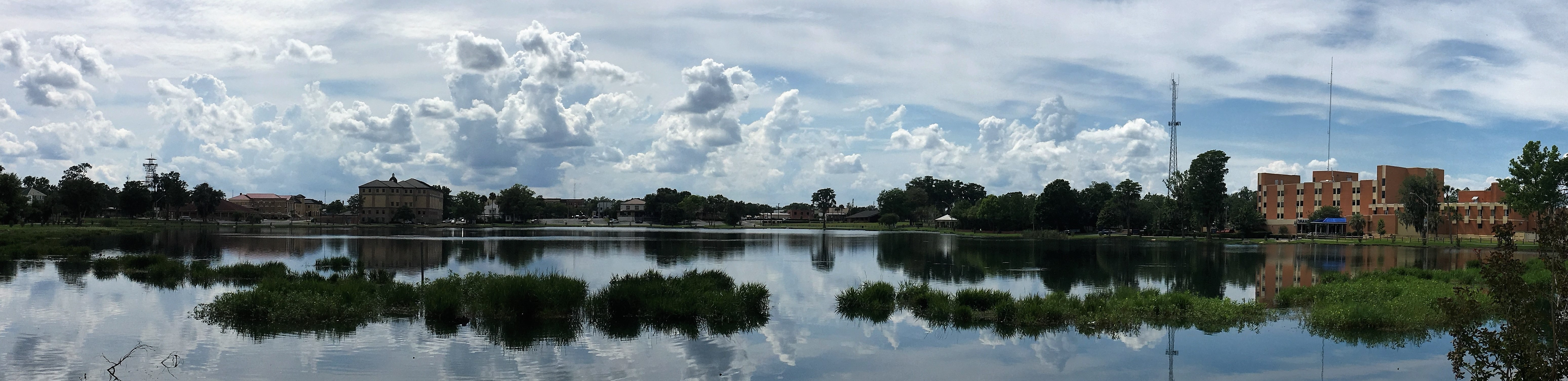
Lake DeSoto and downtown Lake City

== Demographics ==
Historical population
Census	Pop.	Note	%±
1850	131		—
1860	659		403.1%
1870	964		46.3%
1880	1,379		43.0%
1890	2,020		46.5%
1900	4,013		98.7%
1910	5,032		25.4%
1920	3,341		−33.6%
1930	4,416		32.2%
1940	5,836		32.2%
1950	7,571		29.7%
1960	9,465		25.0%
1970	10,575		11.7%
1980	9,257		−12.5%
1990	10,005		8.1%
2000	9,980		−0.2%
2010	12,046		20.7%
2020	12,329		2.3%
U.S. Decennial Census

Lake City first appeared in the 1850 U.S. Census as "Alligator", with a total recorded population of 131.

=== Racial and ethnic composition ===
Lake City racial composition (Hispanics excluded from racial categories) (NH = Non-Hispanic)
Race	Pop 2010	Pop 2020	% 2010	% 2020
White (NH)	6,453	5,886	53.57%	47.74%
Black or African American (NH)	4,432	4,312	36.79%	34.97%
Native American or Alaska Native (NH)	47	37	0.39%	0.30%
Asian (NH)	192	314	1.59%	2.55%
Pacific Islander or Native Hawaiian (NH)	0	9	0.00%	0.07%
Some other race (NH)	25	91	0.21%	0.74%
Two or more races/multiracial (NH)	247	493	2.05%	4.00%
Hispanic or Latino (any race)	650	1,187	5.40%	9.63%
Total	12,046	12,329	100.00%	100.00%

=== 2020 census ===
As of the 2020 census, Lake City had a population of 12,329. The median age was 37.8 years. 24.0% of residents were under the age of 18 and 18.1% of residents were 65 years of age or older. For every 100 females there were 94.7 males, and for every 100 females age 18 and over there were 93.1 males age 18 and over.

99.7% of residents lived in urban areas, while 0.3% lived in rural areas.

There were 4,771 households in Lake City, of which 33.3% had children under the age of 18 living in them. Of all households, 28.8% were married-couple households, 21.5% were households with a male householder and no spouse or partner present, and 40.9% were households with a female householder and no spouse or partner present. About 34.5% of all households were made up of individuals and 14.1% had someone living alone who was 65 years of age or older.

According to the 2020 ACS 5-year estimates, there were 2,321 families residing in the city.

There were 5,298 housing units, of which 9.9% were vacant. The homeowner vacancy rate was 2.6% and the rental vacancy rate was 6.2%.

=== 2010 census ===
As of the 2010 United States census, there were 12,046 people, 4,650 households, and 2,558 families residing in the city.

=== Religion ===
Around 40% of the people of Lake City are affiliated with a religion. Evangelicalism is the largest religious affiliation with 27.9% followed by Protestant (4.7%), Black Protestantism (3.5%), Catholicism (2.4%) and other religions (1.6%). 59.8% are not affiliated with any religion.

Mountaintop Ministries Worldwide, formerly End Time Ministries and commonly called End Timers, was established near Lake City by Charles Meade in 1984. The basis of the ministry was that Lake City would be the only place to survive Armageddon and believers were to stay in an underground bunker on Meade's property.

=== Ancestry/ethnicity ===
As of 2016, the largest self-reported ancestry groups in Lake City, Florida were:

Largest single ancestries in 2016 (excluding Hispanic/Latino groups)	Percent
English	16.4%
Irish	10.1%
German	9.9%
Sub-Saharan African	6.9%
Italian	5.1%
American	2.9%
French	2.7%
Polish	1.7%
West Indian	1.5%
Scotch-Irish	1.4%
Dutch	1.1%
Norwegian	1.1%
Scottish	0.9%
Welsh	0.6%

== Economy ==
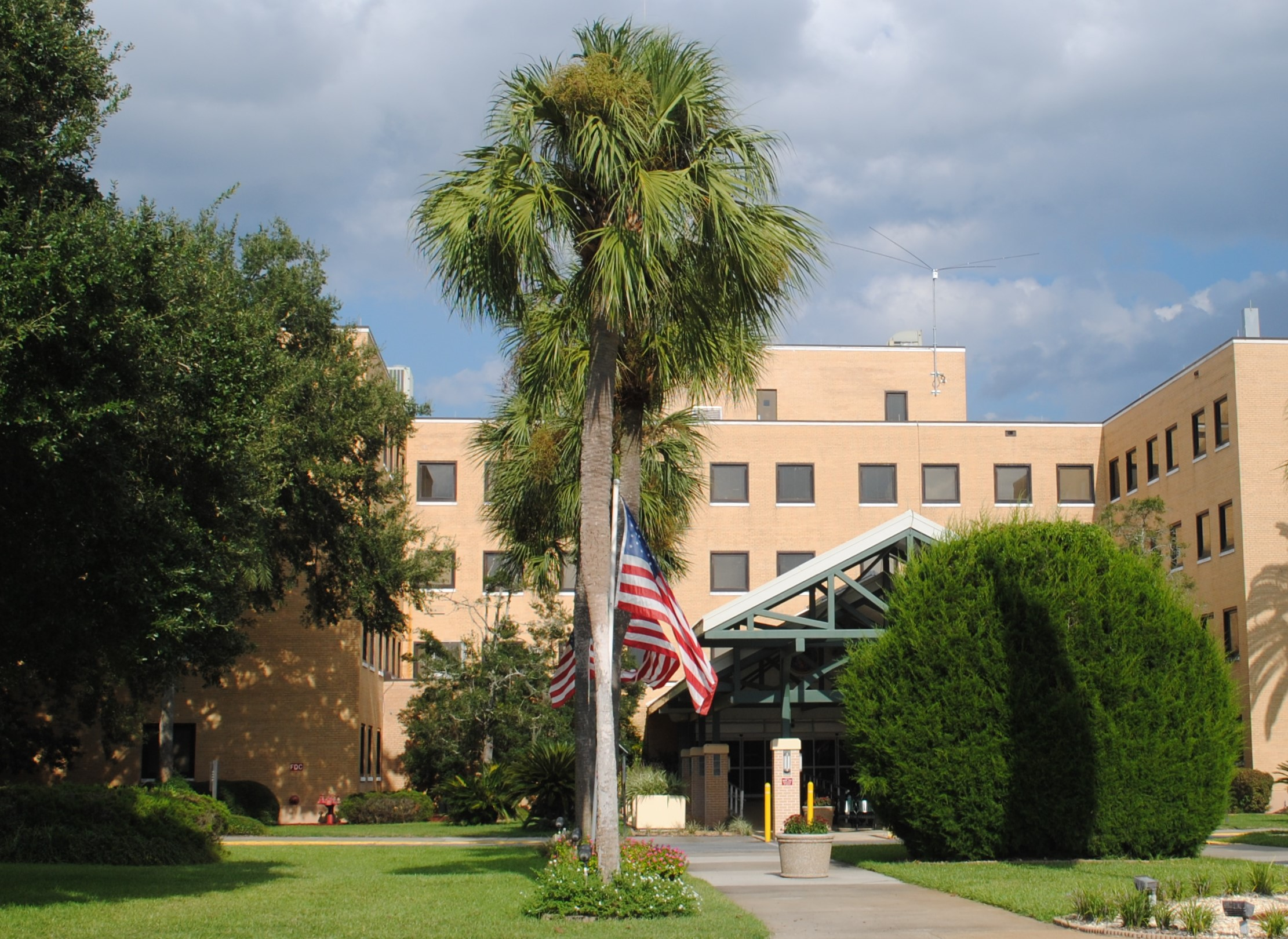
Lake City VA Medical Center

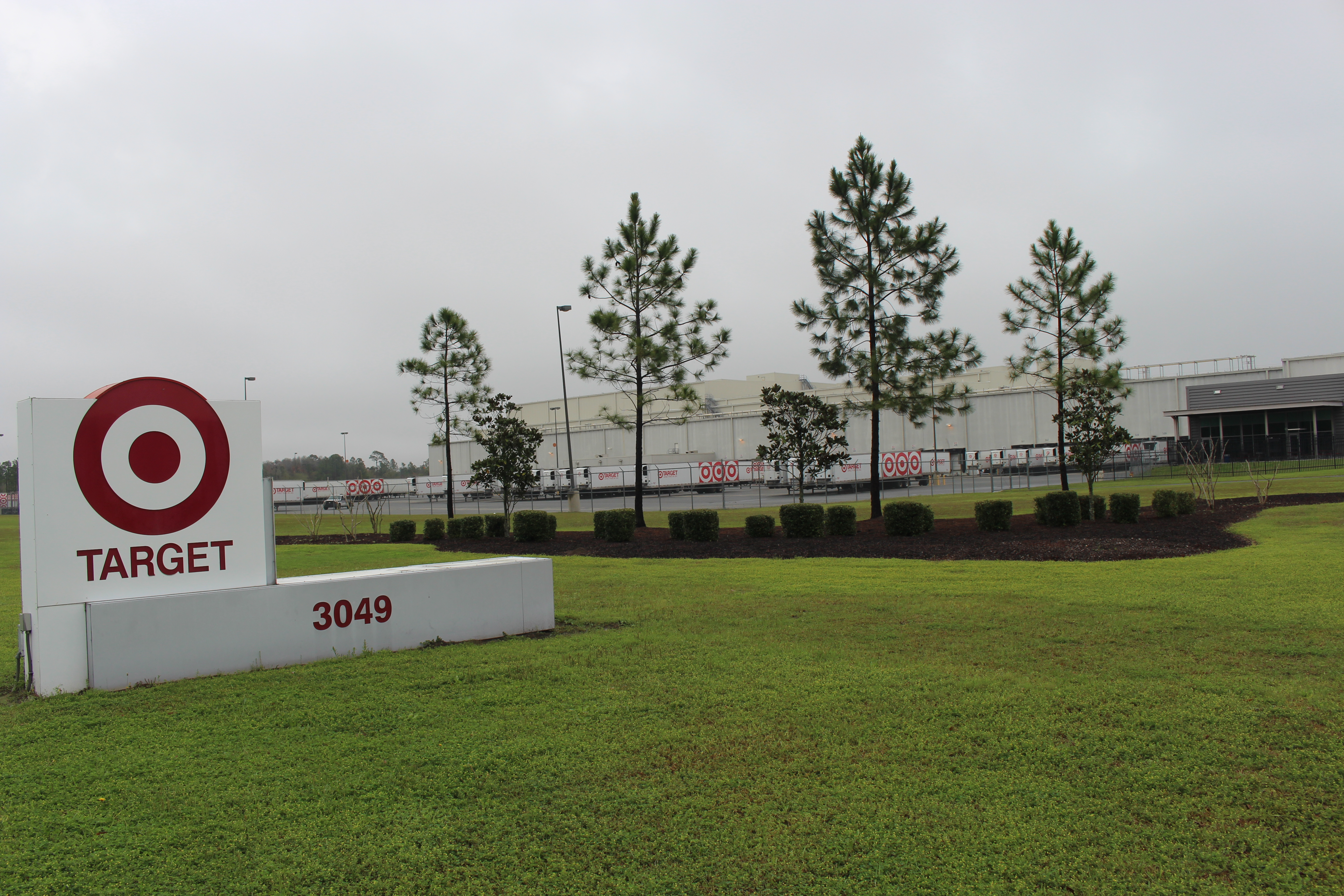
Target Corporation distribution center

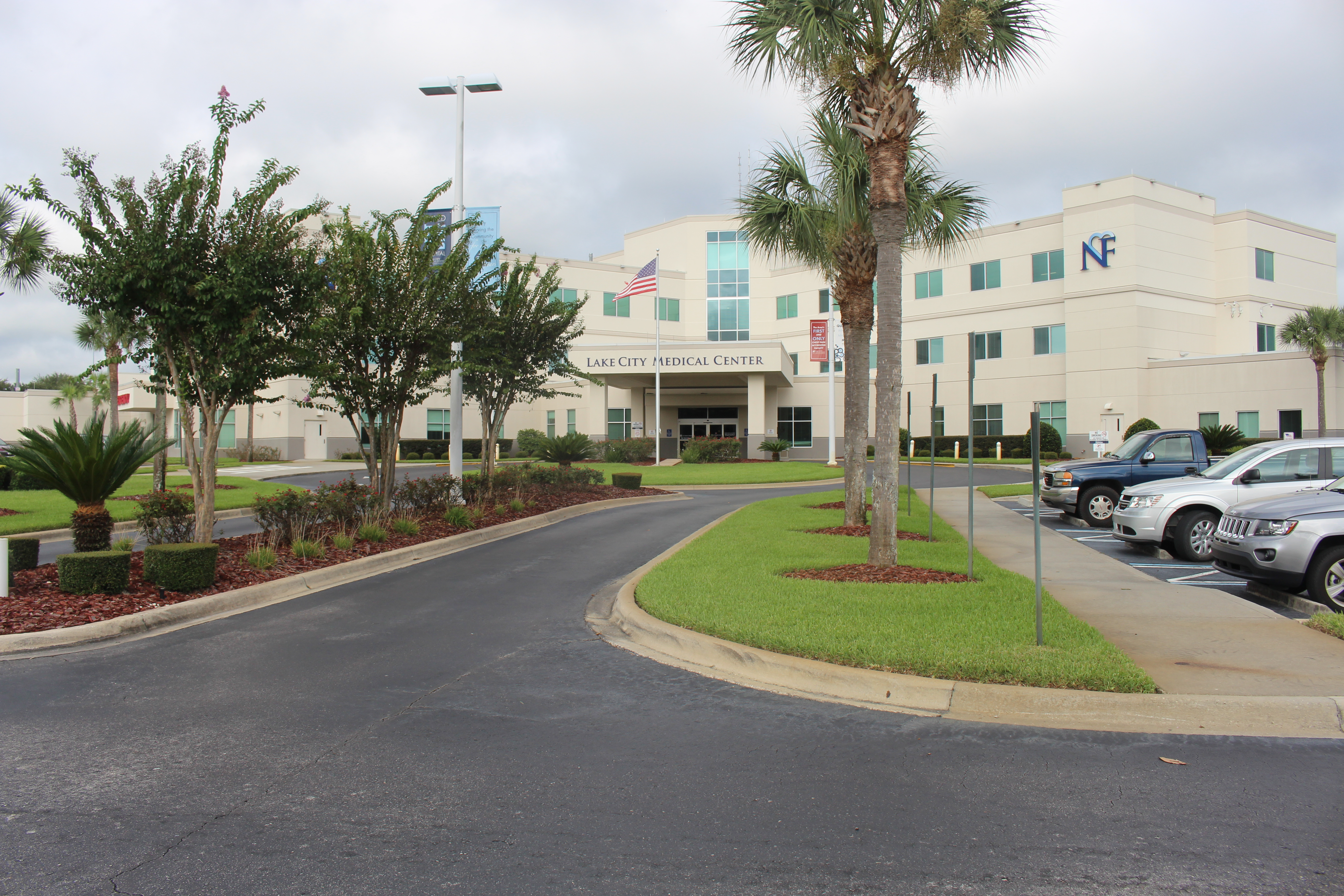
Lake City Medical Center

Lake City and Columbia County are known as "The Gateway to Florida" because Interstate 75 runs through them, carrying a large percentage of Florida's tourist and commercial traffic. Lake City is the northernmost sizable town/city in Florida on Interstate 75 and the location where I-10 and I-75 intersect. Interstate 10 is the southernmost east-west major interstate highway and traverses the country from Jacksonville, Florida, to Santa Monica, California. U.S. 41 and U.S. 90 (the U.S. highway versions of I-75 and I-10) have intersected in Lake City since 1927, long before the Interstate highways were built. The city relies on travelers for a considerable part of its economy.

Lake City is the location of the Osceola National Forest's administrative offices.

Since 2000, three companies have begun large operations in Lake City: Hunter Panels, New Millennium and United States Cold Storage. Target built their first company-owned and third-party-operated perishable food distribution center in Lake City in 2008.

In 2011, The top employers in the Lake City area are:

Rank	Company name	Business description	# employees
1	Columbia County School System	Education/schools/training & development Centers	1,400
2	VA Medical Center	Healthcare	1,200
3	Anderson Columbia Co., Inc.	Asphalt/paving	775
4	PCS Phosphate	Manufacturer	706
5	HAECO	Aircraft maintenance	635
6	Wal-Mart Supercenter	Retail sales	505
7	Lake City Medical Center	Healthcare	430
8	Sitel	Call center	358
9	Shands at Lake Shore	Healthcare	353
10	CCA - Lake City Correctional Facility	Correctional facility	279
11	City of Lake City	Government	260
12	S&S Food Stores	Convenience stores	249
13	Columbia County Manager	Government	248
14	Florida Gateway College	Education	225
15	Health Care Center of Lake City	Healthcare	163
16	Publix Super Markets, Inc.	Grocery stores	151
17	Corbitt Manufacturing Co., Inc.	Manufacturer	115
18	New Millennium	Manufacturer	82
19	Target Food Distribution Center	Distribution	78

== Arts and culture ==
=== Olustee Battle Festival ===
Every February on Presidents' Day weekend since 1976, Lake City has hosted the Olustee Battle Festival and reenactment of the Battle of Olustee spanning three days. The festival begins with a memorial service at Oak Lawn Cemetery in Lake City to honor those who died from both sides on day one and ends with a reenactment at the Olustee Battlefield Historic State Park on day three. From day one to day three various activities from live entertainment to exhibits are on display in downtown Lake City and the Olustee Battlefield Historic State Park.

=== Alligator Warrior Festival ===
The Alligator Warrior Festival is held each year on the weekend of the 3rd Saturday in October to recognize the early history of Columbia County prior to the Civil War. The first Alligator Festival was held in 1995 at Olustee Park in downtown Lake City. Starting in 2010 the annual festival has been held at O'Leno State Park 20 miles (32 km) south of Lake City where the appropriate facilities exist for a full-scale battle reenactment, historic camping and large crowds.

== Parks and recreation ==
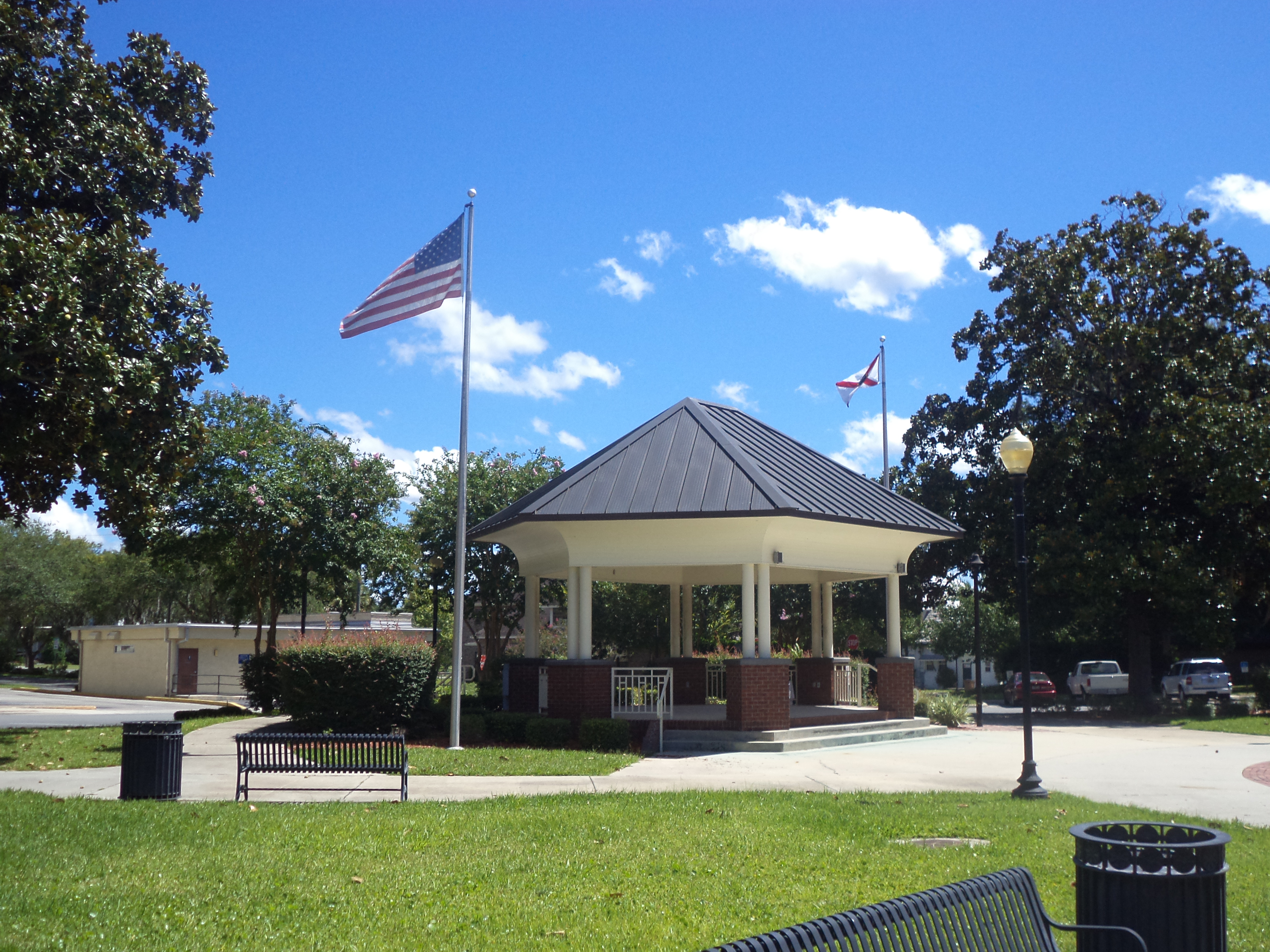
Olustee Park

- Alligator Lake Park
- Falling Creek Falls
- Olustee Park
- Wilson Park
- Osceola National Park
- Southside Sports Complex
- Youngs Park

Lake City is known for its strong focus on football in both the high school program and in its community culture. The town is notable for producing high-performing football players at the collegiate and professional level at a high ratio, considering its small population.

== Government ==
Lake City no longer governs with a mayor. It is governed by a council/city manager form of government. The city council consists of five members, with four representing four city districts, while the mayor serves at-large throughout all of Lake City. The administration of Lake City consists of the city manager's office, the assistant city manager, Human Resources, Procurement, Finance and Technology.

The Lake City Police Department was founded around 1861 during the Civil War. The first fire department was established in 1883 to complement the police department. Argatha Gilmore was the Chief of Police in 2009 after serving 25 years with the Tallahassee Police Department.

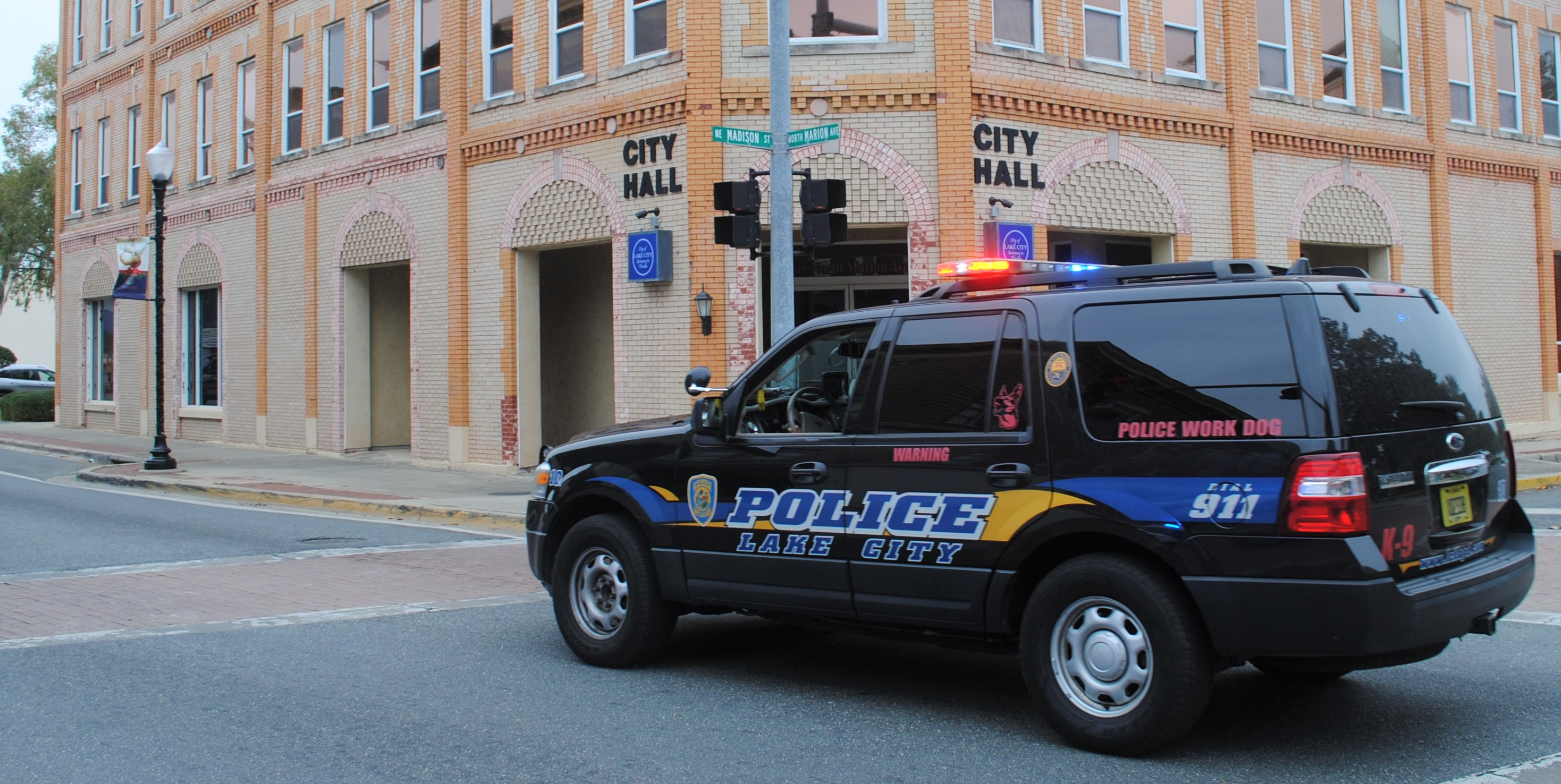
Lake City Police Department vehicle

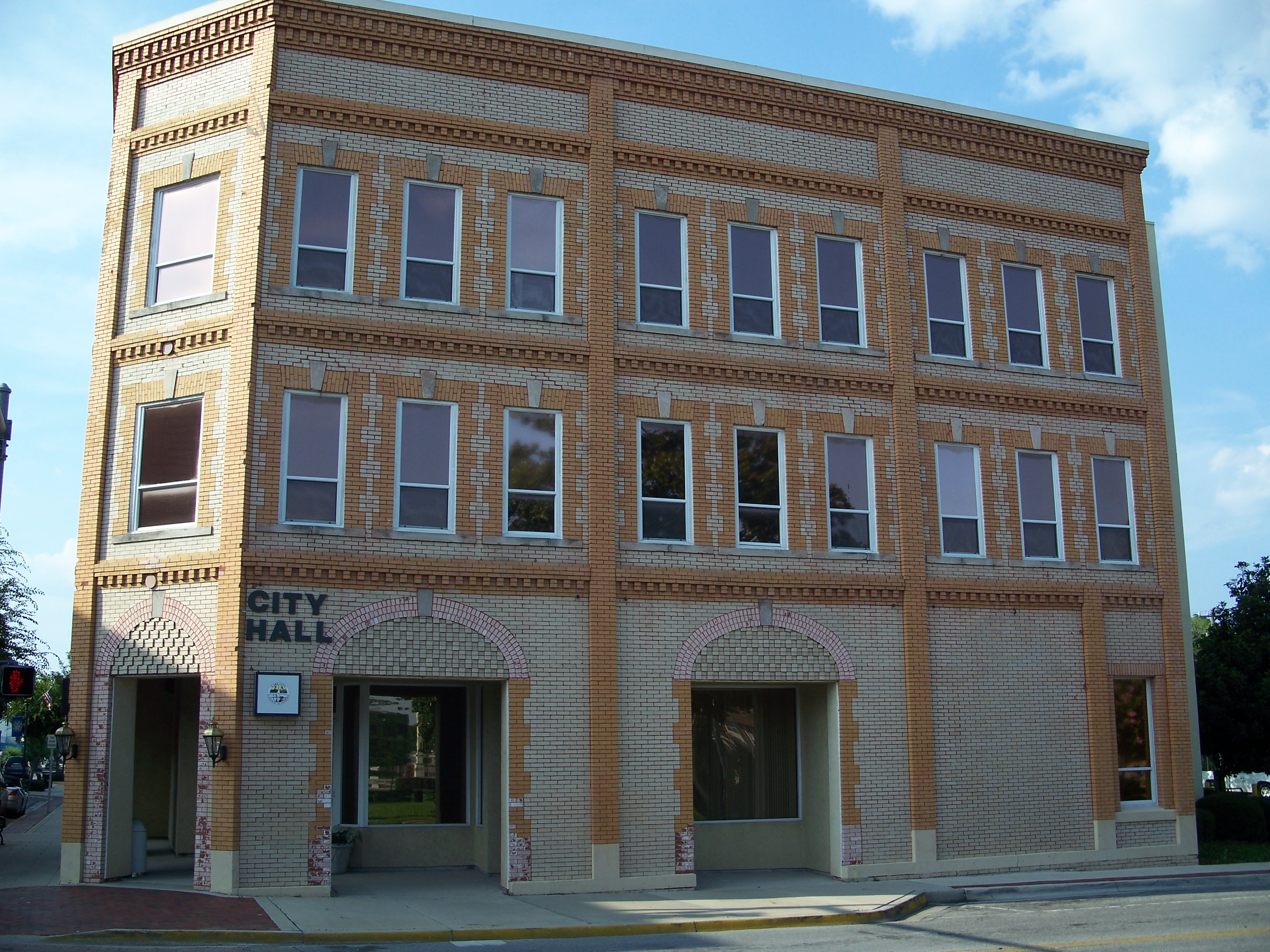
City Hall

== Education ==
The Columbia County School District, the only school district in the entire county, operates nine elementary schools, three middle schools, two high schools and an alternative school. High school football is a major focus for the town.

Lake City has one school of higher education: Florida Gateway College offers associate degrees and four-year bachelor's degrees.

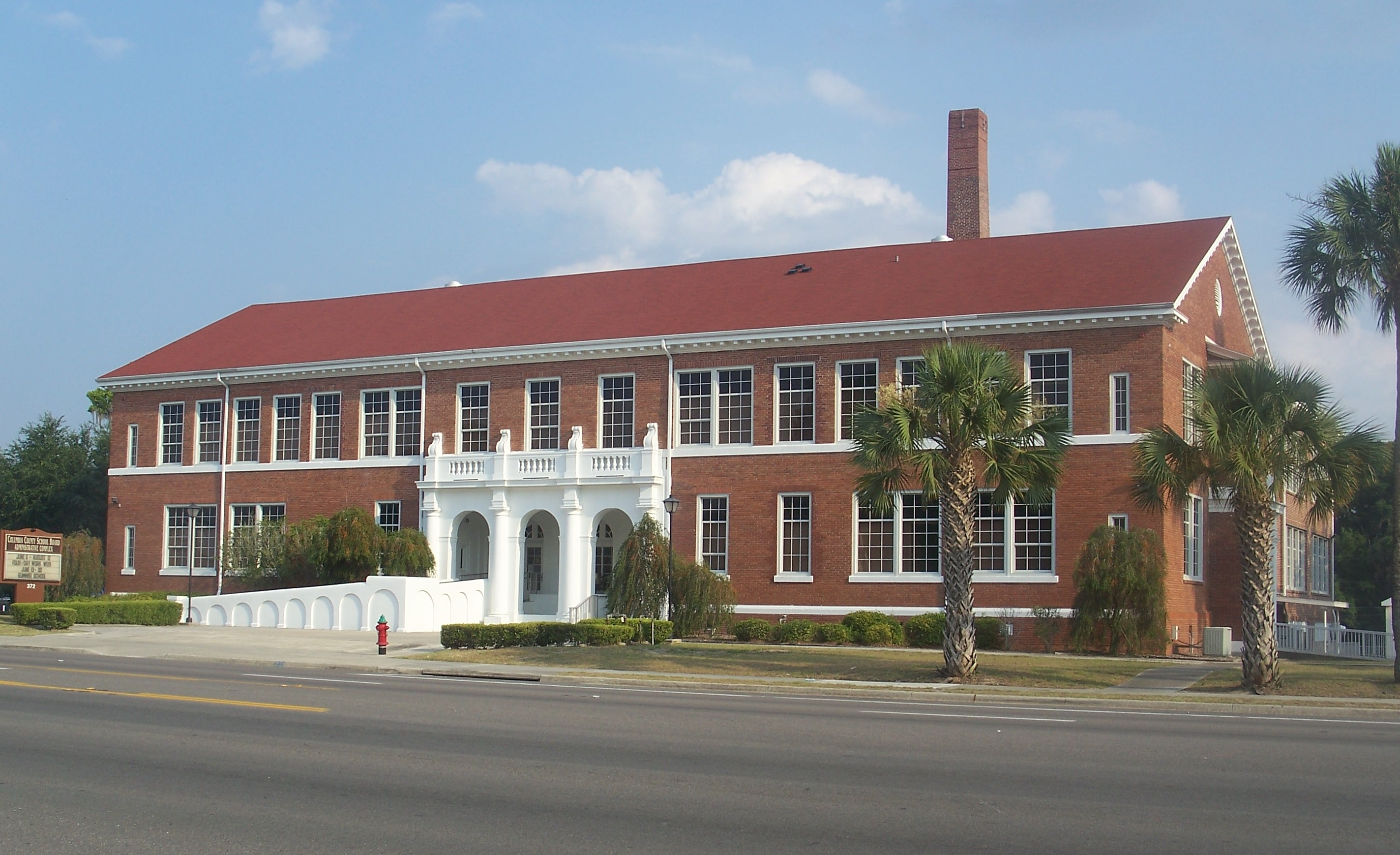
Columbia County High School (1921–1957)

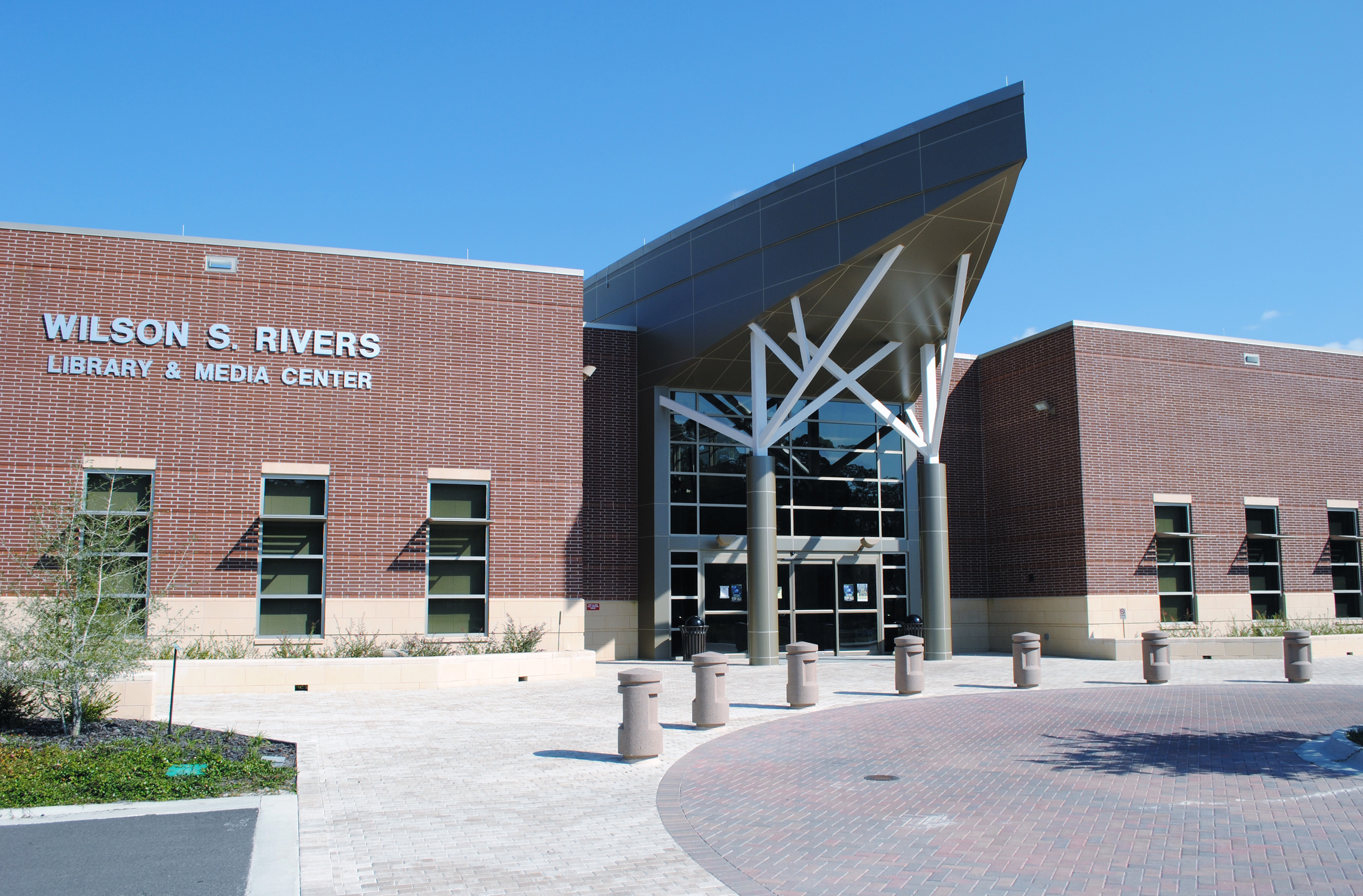
Florida Gateway College

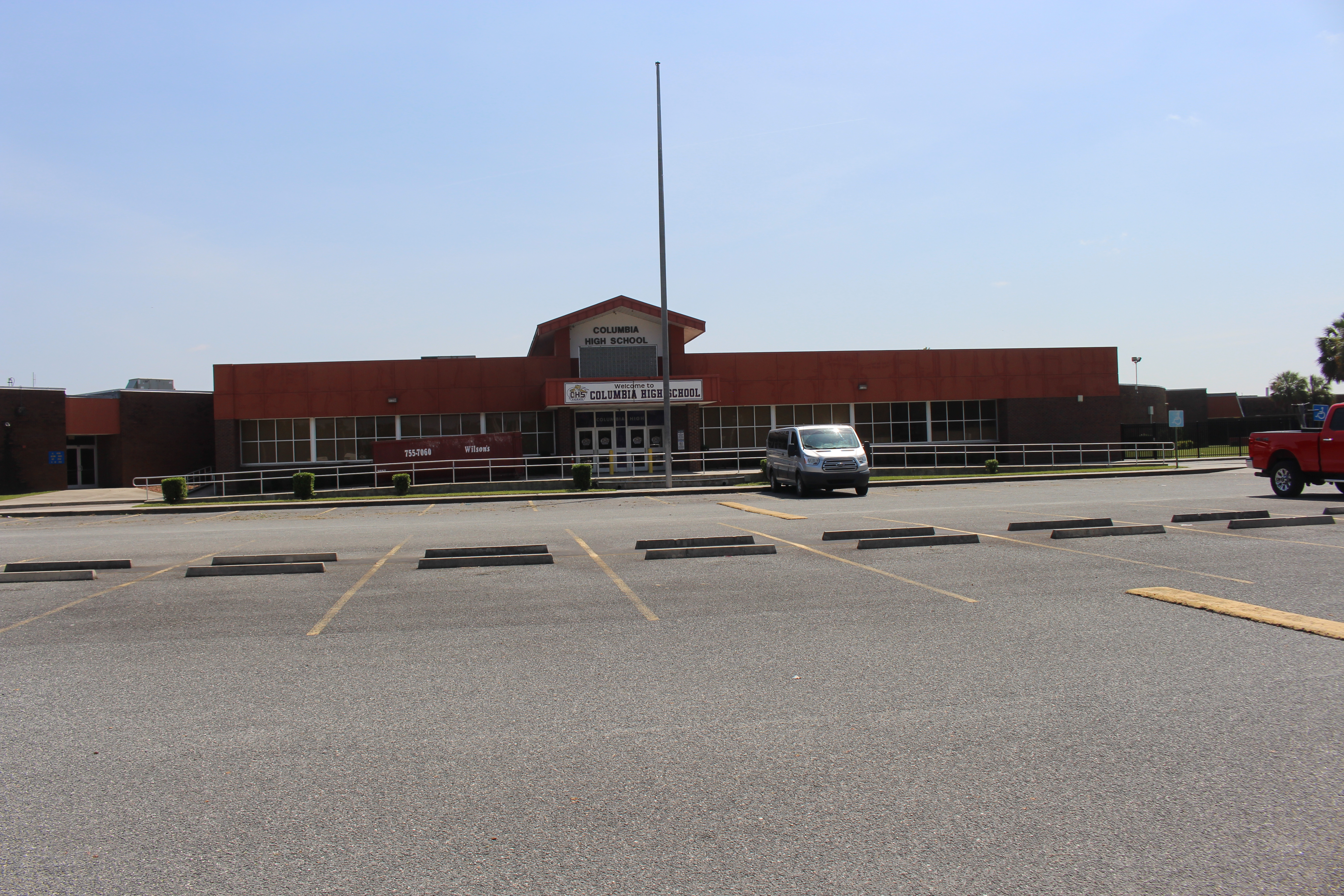
Columbia High School

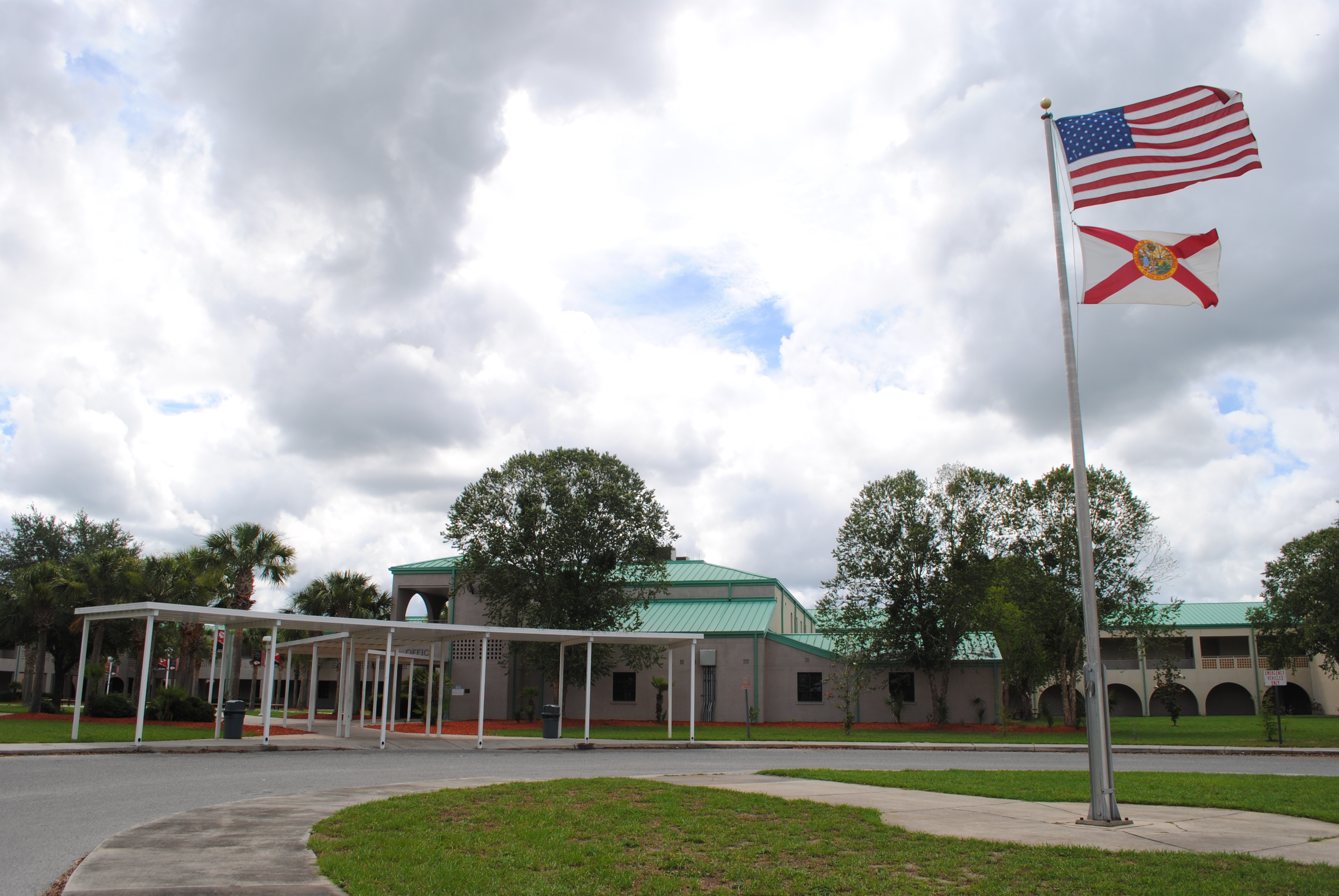
Fort White High School

== Infrastructure ==
=== Transportation ===
==== Airport ====
The Lake City Gateway Airport is a local center of business. The airport is classified as a general aviation facility, but two on-site operations are somewhat unusual. HAECO (formerly TIMCO) is an aircraft modification and rehabilitation operation for large (B-727, 737 and Airbus A-320 A-319) civilian and military aircraft. The U.S. Forest Service uses C-130 transport aircraft in support of its forest fire-fighting operations in the southeastern United States.

==== Interstate ====
- Interstate 75
- Interstate 10

This is where I-75 (exit 435) and I-10 (exit 296) intersect.

==== U.S. Highways ====
- U.S. Route 90
- U.S. Route 41
- U.S. Route 441

==== Railroad ====
Lake City was a scheduled stop for Amtrak's Sunset Limited between Los Angeles and Orlando from 1993 to 2005, when damage to railroad lines and bridges by Hurricane Katrina caused the curtailment of all service east of New Orleans.

Freight service is provided by the Florida Gulf & Atlantic Railroad, which acquired most of the former CSX main line from Pensacola to Jacksonville on June 1, 2019.

== Notable people ==
- Amare Ferrell, safety, Indiana Hoosiers football
- Brian Allen, NFL linebacker
- Blayne Barber, PGA golf player
- Jerome Carter, NFL safety
- Fred P. Cone, 27th governor of Florida
- Shayne Edge, former Florida Gators and Pittsburgh Steelers punter
- Grace Elizabeth, model
- Yatil Green, NFL wide receiver, Miami Dolphins
- Harold Hart, NFL player
- Bertram Herlong, bishop, Episcopal Diocese of Tennessee
- Timmy Jernigan, NFL defensive tackle
- Michael Kirkman, MLB pitcher, World Series, Texas Rangers
- Kimberly Dianne Leach, last victim of serial killer Ted Bundy
- Trey Marshall, NFL safety
- Martha Mier, pianist and composer
- Dwight Stansel, state representative and farmer
- John Franklin Stewart, MLB, second base
- Pat Summerall, NFL placekicker, television sportscaster
- Jasin Todd, former Shinedown guitarist
- Laremy Tunsil, NFL offensive lineman
- Reinard Wilson, NFL linebacker
- Chubby Wise, fiddler
