= Orion Air (United States) =

US contract and charter airline (1981–1989)

Orion Lift Service dba Orion Air Zantop Airways
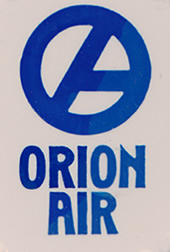
IATA	ICAO	Call sign
HS	TAG; JTZ	TAGGE; JETZAN
- Founded: 1968
- Ceased operations: December 31, 1989 assets sold to Ryan International Airlines)
- Hubs: Louisville, Kentucky
- Fleet size: See Fleet
- Parent company: The Aviation Group (1981–1989)
- Headquarters: Raleigh, North Carolina; Chapel Hill, North Carolina
- Key people: John K. Pirotte; Lloyd Zantop

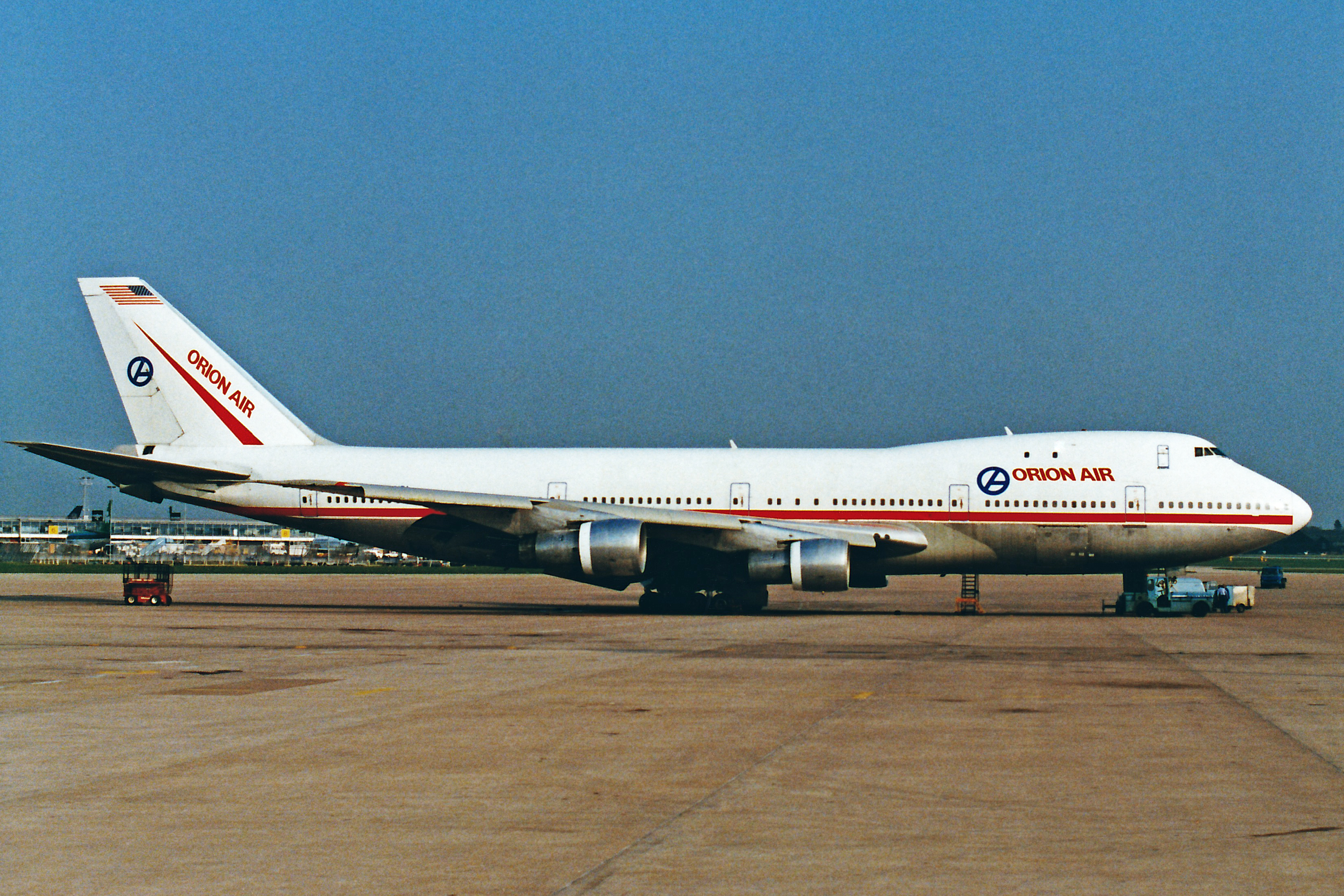
The Flying Pig: Boeing 747-121 at Manchester 1989. Delays made this aircraft notorious in the UK press and led to cancellation of Orion's contract with British tour operator Airtours, see text

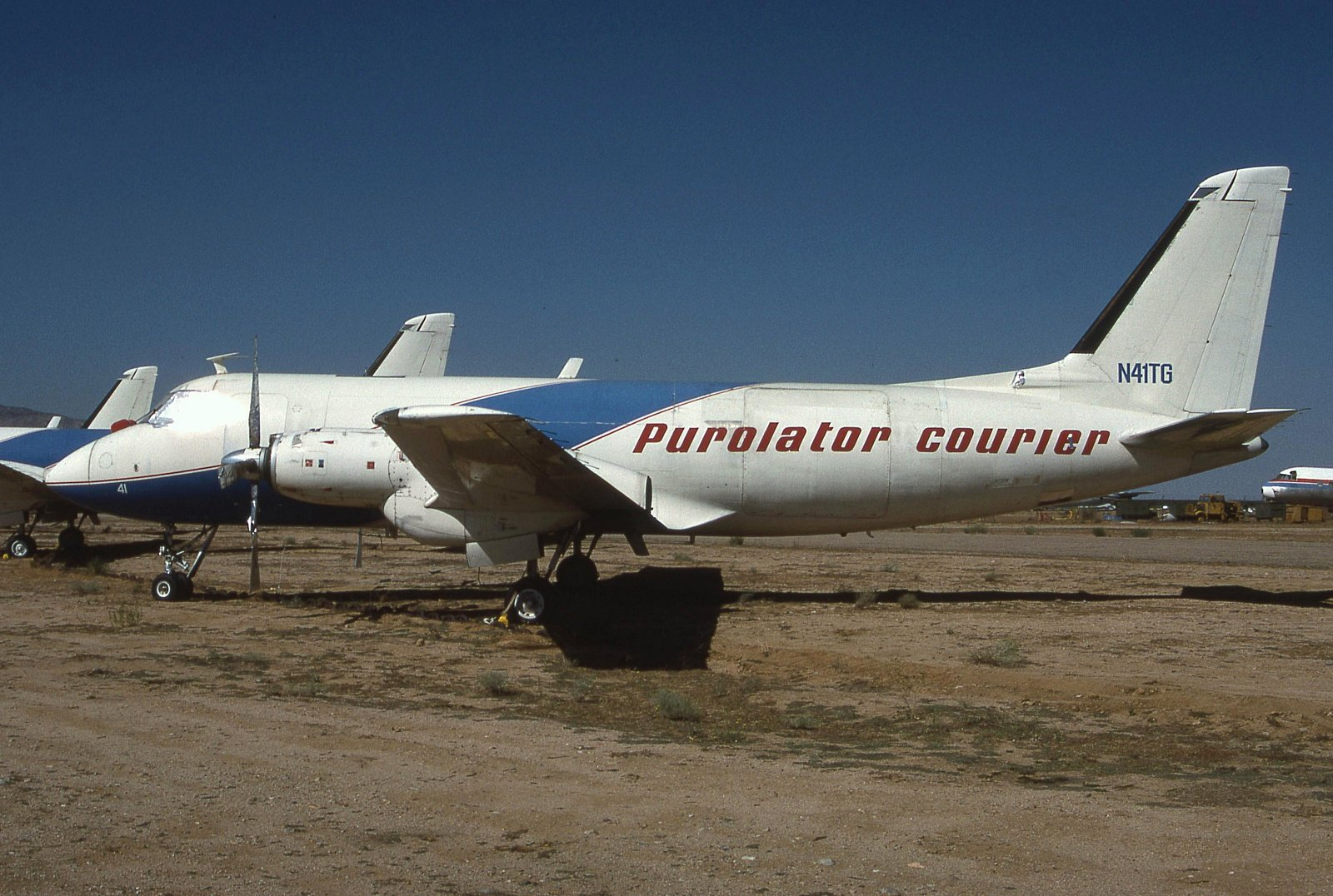
Ex-Orion, ex-General G-159 freighter stored at Mojave 1988

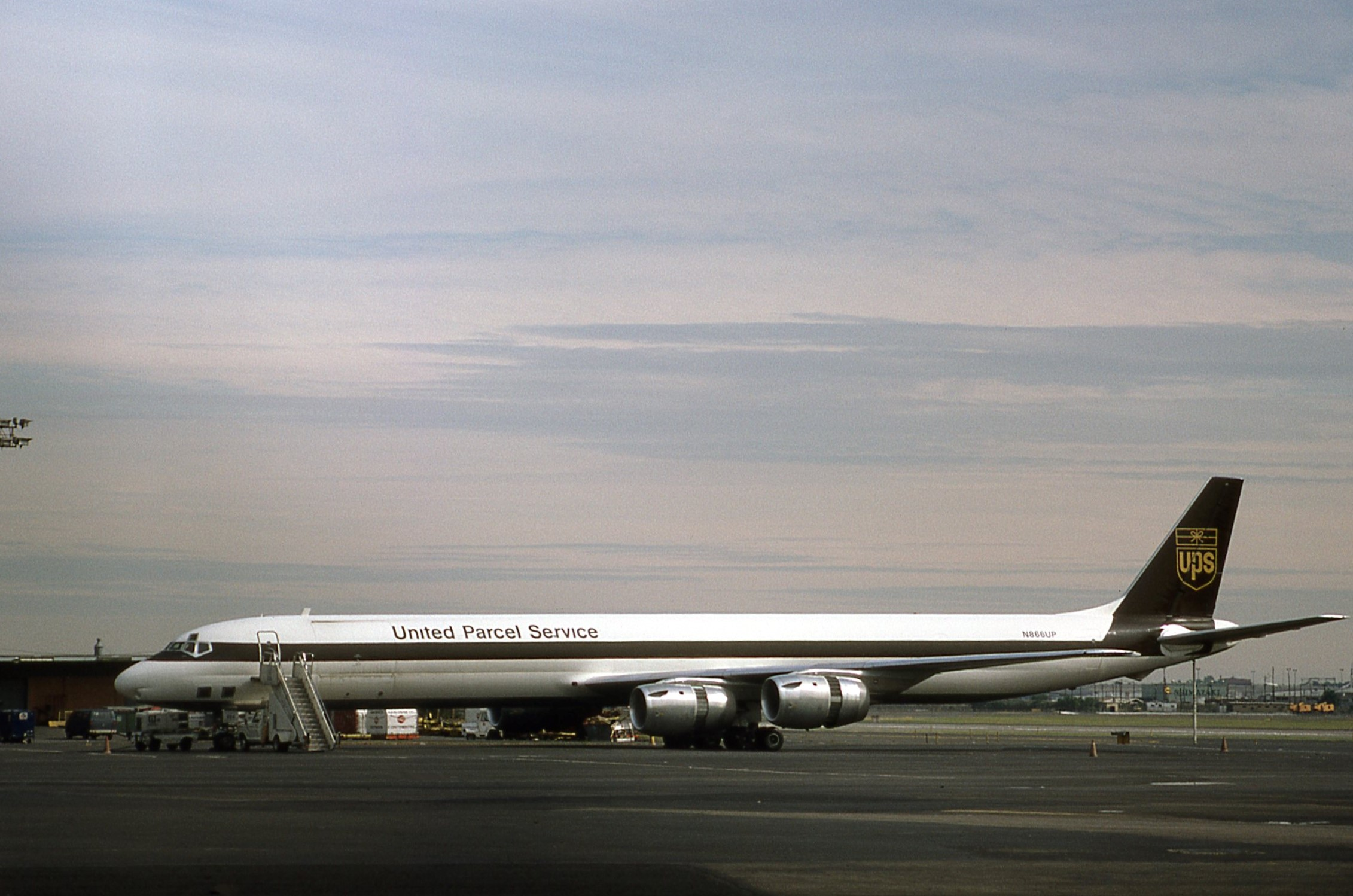
United Parcel Service DC-8-73F in Orion Air operation Newark 1984

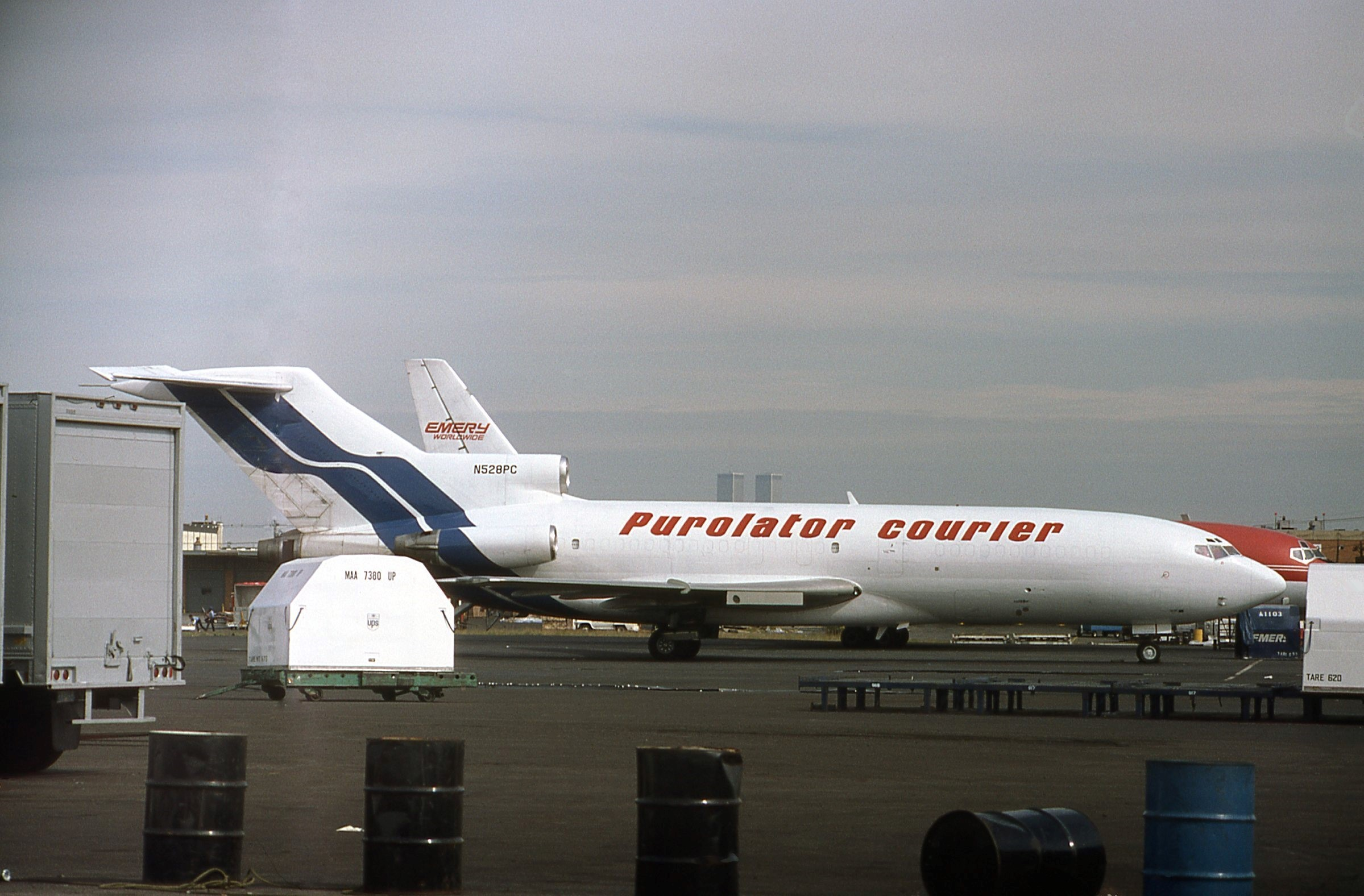
Purolator Courier Boeing 727-100C in Orion Air operation Newark 1984

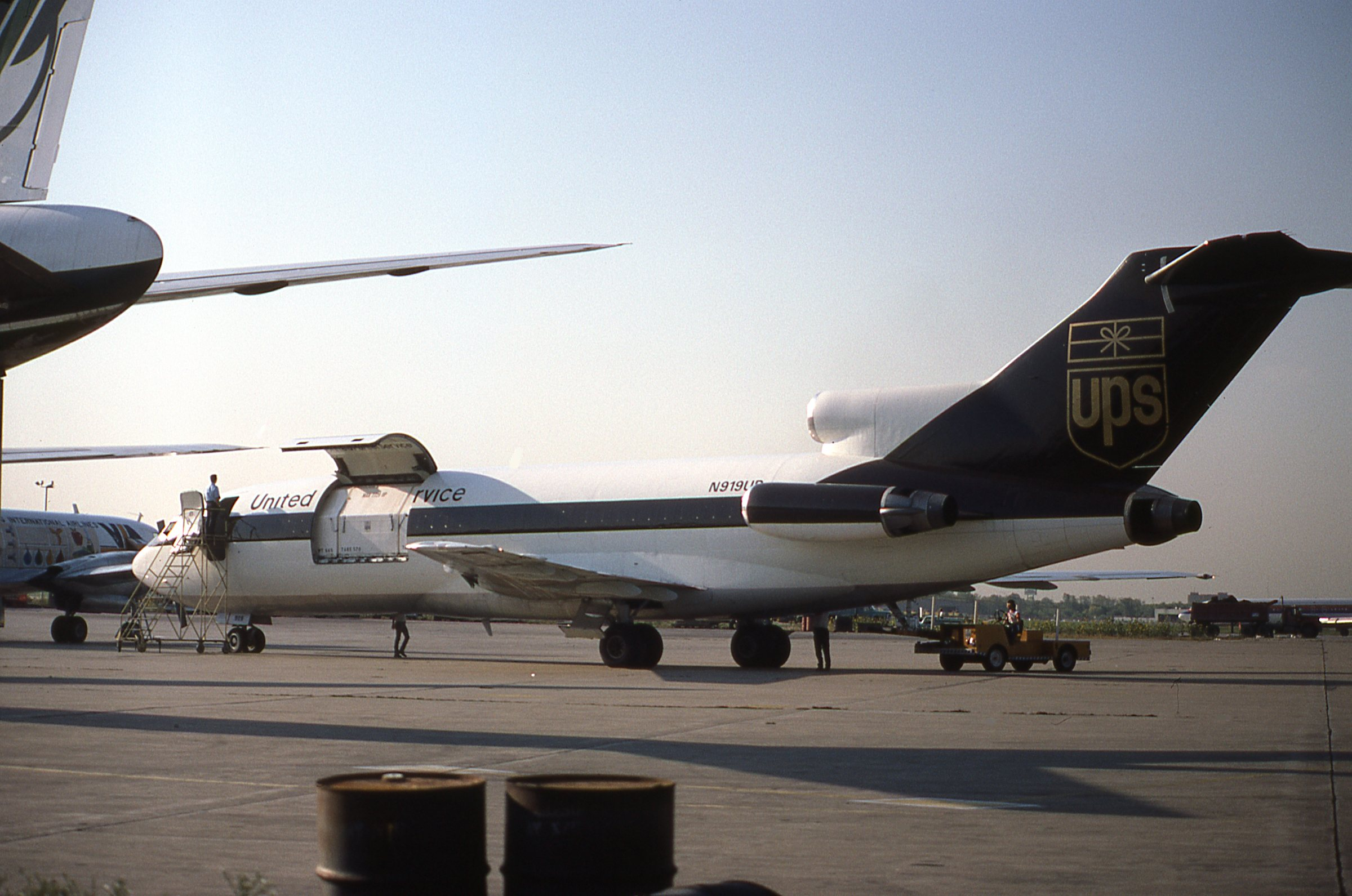
United Parcel Service Boeing 727-100C in Orion Air operation Chicago 1984

Orion Lift Service dba Orion Air was a US charter and contract freight airline founded on the earlier Zantop Airways by parent company The Aviation Group (TAG), originally to fly Gulfstream G-159 freighters. In October 1981 it was certificated to fly Boeing 727s on behalf of United Parcel Service (UPS). Orion grew to a fleet of over 50 commercial jets, including Boeing 747s, flying for several package express/air freight operators. But in 1988, Orion lost much of its business when UPS brought air operations in-house. In 1989, Orion flew charters under its own name only to have its tour operator contract cancelled. Meanwhile, Emery Worldwide, Orion's remaining freight contract, announced it would also eventually move most flying in-house. Orion ended operations at the end of 1989; remaining aircraft transferred to Ryan International Airlines.

Zantop Airways was a Part 298 (or air taxi) carrier started in 1968 by Lloyd Zantop, one of the brothers who founded the separate carriers Zantop Air Transport and Zantop International Airlines. The Aviation Group (TAG) bought Zantop Airways in 1981. The underlying corporation dated to 1948; prior to Zantop Airways it was Wayne County Flying Service.

In 1983, TAG bought another carrier, General Aviation Enterprises, to which the original Orion G-159 business was transferred. General Aviation briefly became a subsidiary of Orion Air in 1987, before being sold to Kitty Hawk Group in 1988, becoming Kitty Hawk Air Cargo. Another TAG spinoff was the aircraft maintenance organization TIMCO, originally created with Orion in mind.

== History ==
=== Lloyd Zantop ===
Lloyd Zantop was one of the brothers who founded Zantop Air Transport (ZAT) and Zantop International Airlines (ZIA). Between the 1966 sale of ZAT and the 1972 establishment of ZIA, Lloyd Zantop founded Zantop Airways, separate and distinct from the other Zantop carriers, from Wayne County Flying Service (WCFS), which he bought in 1968. WCFS, which offered flight instruction and chartered small aircraft, was incorporated in 1948. Zantop Airways operated as a Part 298 (air taxi) carrier, flying small aircraft for clients such as Emery, Federal Express and auto manufacturers. An associated company, Zantop Aviation, leased aircraft.

=== Rise ===
The Aviation Group (TAG) was founded in 1977 in Chapel Hill, North Carolina (moving to Raleigh in 1982) to apply Gulfstream G-159s to air freight. TAG acquired and improved a supplemental type certificate to add a cargo door to the G-159 and converted "at least nine" G-159s. In February 1981, Lloyd Zantop closed the sale of Zantop Airways to TAG; the airline had G-159s (see Fleet). TAG changed the airline's name to Orion Lift Service, with trade name Orion Air. In October 1981 the Civil Aeronautics Board (CAB) awarded Orion an all-cargo airline certificate so it could fly nine Boeing 727s for United Parcel Service (UPS). In fact, the CAB provided Orion temporary exemption to fly for UPS in September in advance of awarding the certificate. The nine ex-Braniff aircraft were the first UPS bought. TAG went public in December 1981.

Orion Air would come to fly over 50 commercial jet freighters under contract to Purolator, Emery Worldwide and CF AirFreight as well as UPS (see Fleet). Under a typical contract, the client supplied the aircraft and fuel, with Orion providing crews and maintenance. However, UPS remained its largest customer and UPS's main hub was at Louisville, Kentucky, making that Orion's main base. TAG at one time considered moving its headquarters there, and established a pilot training center in Louisville, including simulators. TAG diversified within and outside aviation. For instance, in 1983 TAG bought another airline (discussed below) and a company that rented TVs to hospitals (purchase closed in early 1984). In 1985, Orion phased out the G-159s; the aircraft were too small. In January 1986, Primark, originally a Michigan-based utility, closed the purchase of TAG for $129 million (about $390 million in 2026 terms).

=== The Flying Pig ===
In April 1987, the Federal Aviation Administration (FAA) grounded Orion's DC-9s and 727s (37 out of then 56 aircraft) after repeated inability to produce life-limited parts and airworthiness directives data for those fleets, leaving Orion's clients (CF AirFreight, Emery, Purolator, UPS) scrambling to find replacements for a few days until Orion found the records. In July, UPS decided to bring flying in-house, which was announced in August; UPS accounted for just under half of Orion's revenues, and Orion had 450 employees based at Louisville. In September, Primark eliminated TAG as an operating entity; Primark transferred TAG's other aviation subsidiaries under Orion and moved TAG's non-aviation subsidiaries elsewhere within Primark. TAG's CEO, John K. Pirotte, in the role since 1981, left the company, which he said was unrelated to UPS's decision. UPS bought Orion's Louisville training center.

Meanwhile, in 1987, Emery acquired Purolator and in 1989, Consolidated Freightways (CF) bought Emery, into which it merged its CF AirFreight unit. Thus, over the course of two years, Orion Air went from four customers (CF AirFreight, Emery, Purolator and UPS) to just one (Emery). Orion's contract with Emery also resulted in significant losses, requiring renegotiation in 1989. Further, CF also bought its own airline in 1989, creating Emery Worldwide Airlines (EWA). Emery said that over time, it expected EWA to perform all its flying. In 1989, Orion attempted to diversify by operating a 747 for passenger charters (see picture). Unfortunately, operational issues led to significant delays for passengers of British tour operator Airtours, causing the 747 to be dubbed "the Flying Pig" by the UK press and cancellation of the two-year contract, worth $8.6 million in 1989. Primark put its aviation activities up for sale in October, with one exception. Orion Air's remaining operations transferred to Ryan International Airlines as of 2 January 1990, for a $3.5 million note. The exception was the almost-completed maintenance facility called TIMCO at Piedmont Triad International Airport (near Greensboro, North Carolina), originally designed to maintain Orion, which Primark retained.

=== Eastern Air Lines ===
In 1988, Eastern Air Lines contracted with Orion to fly 26 or more Boeing 727s in passenger service as part of contingency plans by Eastern, then controlled by Frank Lorenzo, for a strike. This attracted considerable controversy, including Congressional hearings. Later in the year Eastern cancelled the contract, without comment.

=== General Aviation Enterprises ===
In 1983, TAG bought General Aviation Enterprises (ICAO: GNL, call sign: GENERAL) of Greeneville, Tennessee, (incorporated 1979) which became its propeller aircraft operation. General Aviation flew the G-159s as well as piston Convairliners (see Fleet). When Primark eliminated TAG as an operating entity in 1987, General became an Orion Air subsidiary. Kitty Hawk Group bought General in 1988, creating Kitty Hawk Air Cargo.

== Fleet ==
World Airline Fleets 1979 (copyright 1979) shows Zantop Aviation with:

- 1 Cessna 401A
- 3 Gulfstream G-159
- 1 HFB 320 Hansa Jet
- 2 Learjet 23

31 March 1981 AvData showed Zantop Airways with 7 Gulfstream G-159

1987-88 World Airline Fleets (copyright 1987) shows Orion Air with (client shown in parentheses):

- 2 Boeing 727-100F (CF AirFreight)
- 10 Boeing 727-100F (Emery Worldwide)
- 4 Boeing 727-100F (Purolator Courier)
- 13 Boeing 727-100F (UPS)
- 6 Boeing 747-100F (UPS)
- 7 Douglas DC-8-73F (UPS)
- 8 Douglas DC-9-15F (Purolator Courier)

1987-88 World Airline Fleets (copyright 1987) shows General Aviation with (client shown in parenthesis):

- 3 Convair 240
- 1 Convair 340
- 3 Convair 440
- 6 Gulfstream G-159 (Purolator Courier)
- 1 Gulfstream G-159

JP fleets 1989 (copyright May 1989) shows Orion Air with (client shown in parenthesis):

- 34 Boeing 727-100F (Emery Worldwide)
- 2 Boeing 727-100F
- 1 Boeing 747-100
- 8 Douglas DC-9-15F (Emery Worldwide)

== Accidents ==
- 15 December 1972: Zantop Airways Learjet 23 N20M on a flight to Lexington, Kentucky crashed on takeoff from Detroit into a gas tank, killing two pilots on board and one person on the ground. Probable cause was "undetermined." (Note: As of 5 February 2026, the Aviation Safety Network reference lists this accident as Zantop International Airlines, but the July 1971 U.S. Civil Aircraft Register clearly shows the aircraft registered to Zantop Aviation, sister company to Zantop Airways, also what contemporary reporting reflects)
- 15 July 1983: Orion Air Gulfstream G-159 N68TG performing flight TAG409 from Knoxville, Tennessee landed long and overran the runway at Tri-Cities, Tennessee leading to destruction of the aircraft from fire, but no fatalities among the crew of two, nor any escape of material from the radioactive cargo. The captain was cited for mismanaging speed and distance.
- 31 May 1985: Both crew were killed when General Aviation Gulfstream G-159 N181TG performing flight GNL115 from Nashville to Indianapolis crashed on takeoff. The crew failed to perform a pre-flight checklist, leaving a power lever in a position that caused the left engine to shutdown. The crew then also failed to perform the correct emergency procedure for an engine-out situation.

== See also ==
- List of defunct airlines of the United States
- Zantop Air Transport
- Zantop International Airlines
- UPS Airlines
- Emery Worldwide Airlines
- TIMCO
- Kitty Hawk Air Cargo
