= HAECO =

Aircraft engineering and maintenance group

Hong Kong Aircraft Engineering Company Limited 香港飛機工程有限公司
- Type: Private
- Industry: Aerospace
- Founded: 23 November 1950; 75 years ago
- Headquarters: Hong Kong
- Key people: Richard Sell (CEO)
- Services: Airframe services, line services, inventory technical management, component overhaul, aerostructure repairs, landing gear services, engine services, global engine support, parts manufacturing, and technical training
- Number of employees: 15,000 (2022)
- Parent: Swire Pacific Limited
- Website: www.haeco.com

Hong Kong Aircraft Engineering Company Limited (HAECO) is an aircraft engineering and maintenance firm headquartered at Hong Kong International Airport. It is a member of the Swire Group.

On November 3, 2025, HAECO Americas, which employed approximately 1,600 people in Greensboro, North Carolina and Lake City, Florida, was acquired by AAR Corp. for $78 million. At the time, HAECO Americas was the second-largest heavy aircraft maintenance company in North America. The company had previously acquired Timco Aviation Services, a Greensboro-based firm, for $388.8 million in 2014.
