= Frank Pierce Milburn =

American architect (1868–1926)

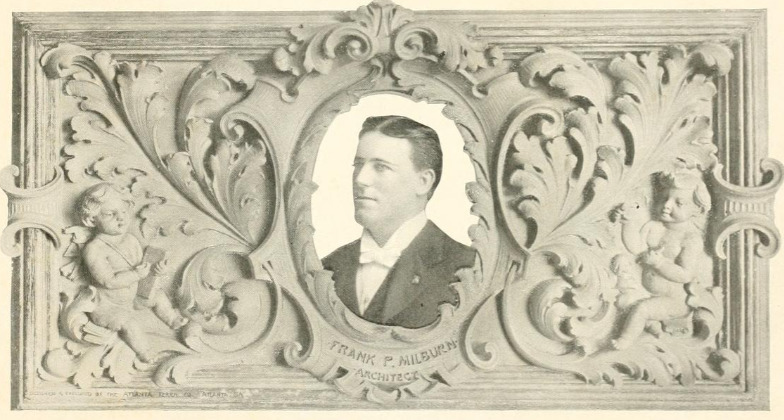
Portrait of Milburn from his self-published book

Frank Pierce Milburn (December 12, 1868 - September 21, 1926) was a prolific American architect of the late 19th and early 20th centuries. His practice was primarily focused on public buildings, particularly courthouses and legislative buildings, although he also designed railroad stations, commercial buildings, schools and residences. Milburn was a native of Bowling Green, Kentucky who practiced as an architect in Louisville from 1884 to 1889; Kenova, West Virginia 1890–1895; Charlotte, North Carolina; Columbia, South Carolina; and Washington, D.C. after 1904. From 1902 Milburn was architect for the Southern Railway.

Milburn pioneered a new approach to the marketing of architectural services, publishing sponsored books of his work, placing advertisements in trade publications, entering competitions and moving his office to suit available opportunities. This resulted in work in every Southern state.

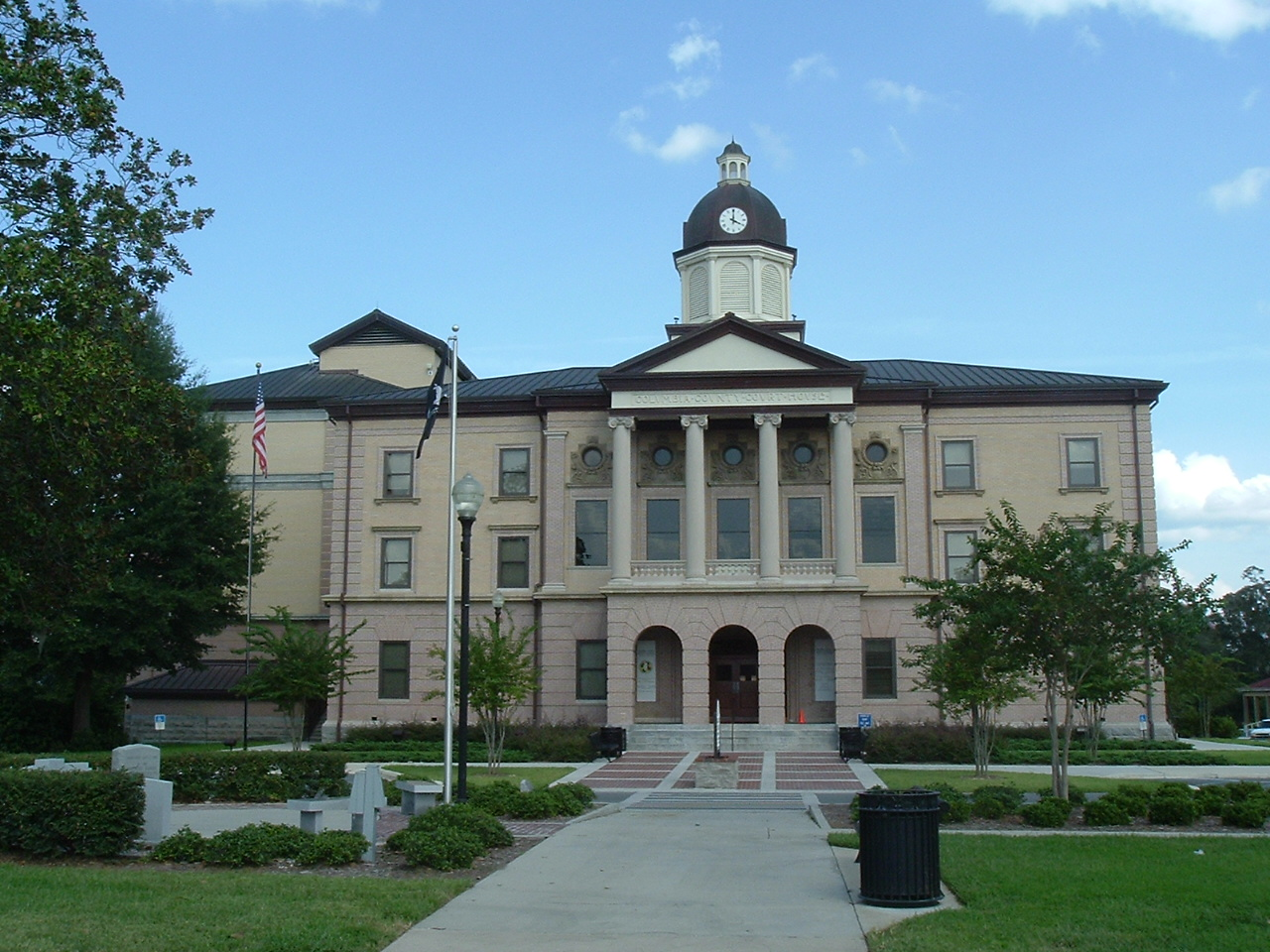
Columbia County Courthouse (Columbia County, Florida)

Milburn was particularly successful in obtaining commissions for significant public buildings, ranging from county courthouses to state capitols. Milburn did significant work at the South Carolina State House and the old Florida State Capitol, and unsuccessfully competed for work on the Arkansas Capitol.

In 1902, Milburn did design upgrade for the Florida State Capitol and designed Columbia County Courthouse in Lake City, Florida. That same year he also designed the Blanche Hotel across the street from the courthouse.

== South Carolina State House ==
Milburn won a 1900 competition to complete the South Carolina State House over William Augustus Edwards and Charles Coker Wilson, as well as Gadsen E. Shand, an assistant to former State House architect Frank Niernsee.

Milburn's selection was made easier by the fact that the proposed cost for his design was the least expensive of those submitted. Plans and specifications were issued and bids accepted, but a dispute broke out immediately over differences between the competition design and that issued for bidding. Milburn had reduced the number of columns on the north portico by six and had removed a line of columns on the south portico to remain within the appropriated budget. Other changes to the dome and disputes over the quantity and accuracy of details and the quality of the work caused legal and political difficulties, but the project proceeded. Milburn, however, moved to Washington when his work with the Southern Railway offered the opportunity.

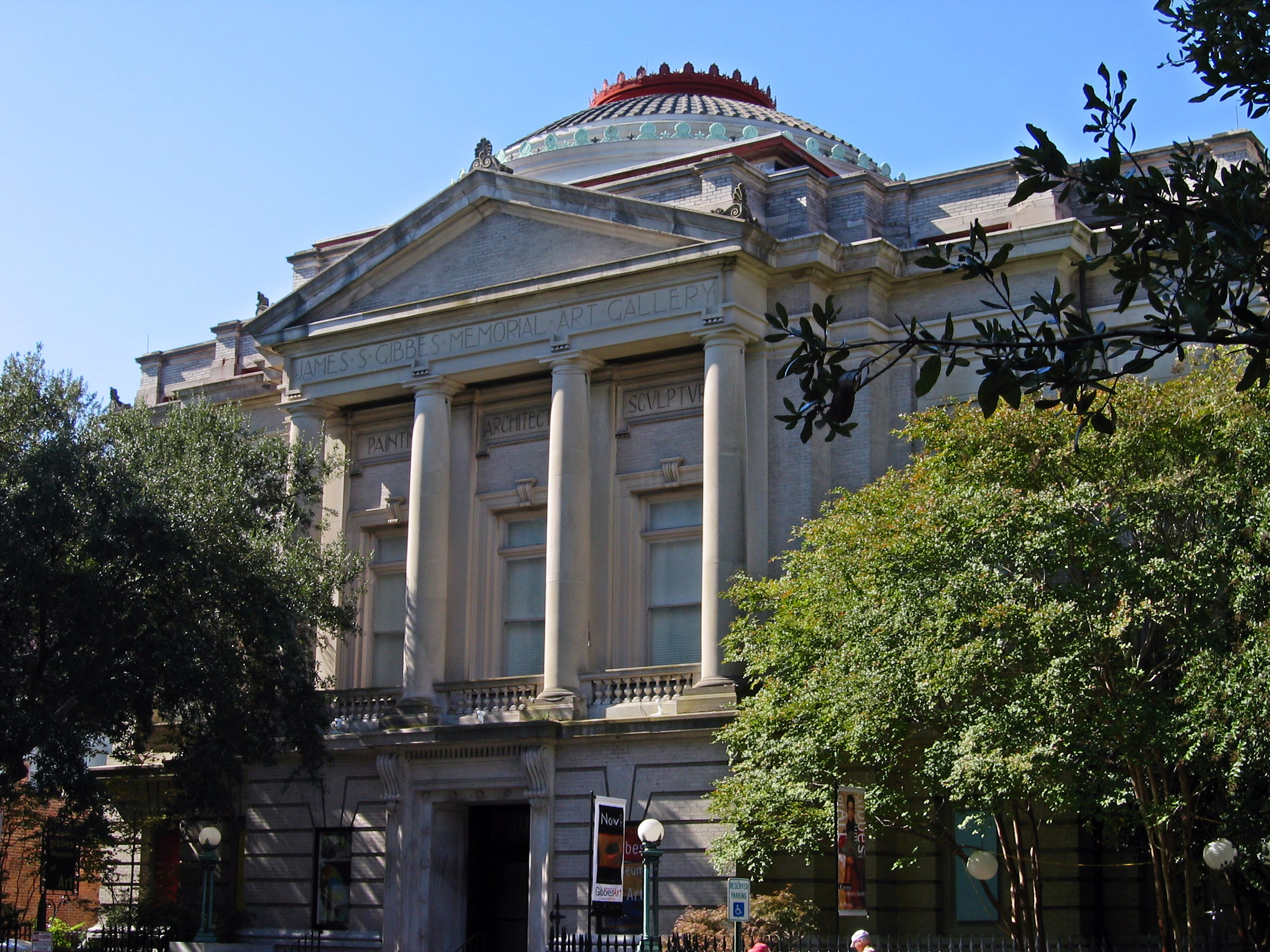
Gibbes Museum of Art in Charleston, South Carolina

== In Washington ==
Once in Washington, Milburn teamed with Michael Heister (1909 - 1934) to form the firm of Milburn and Heister. Milburn's son, Thomas Y. Milburn, joined the firm in 1914 and took over the firm a year before his father's death in 1926.

== Work ==
- W. Hunt Harris house at 425 Caroline Street in Key West, Florida

== Gallery ==
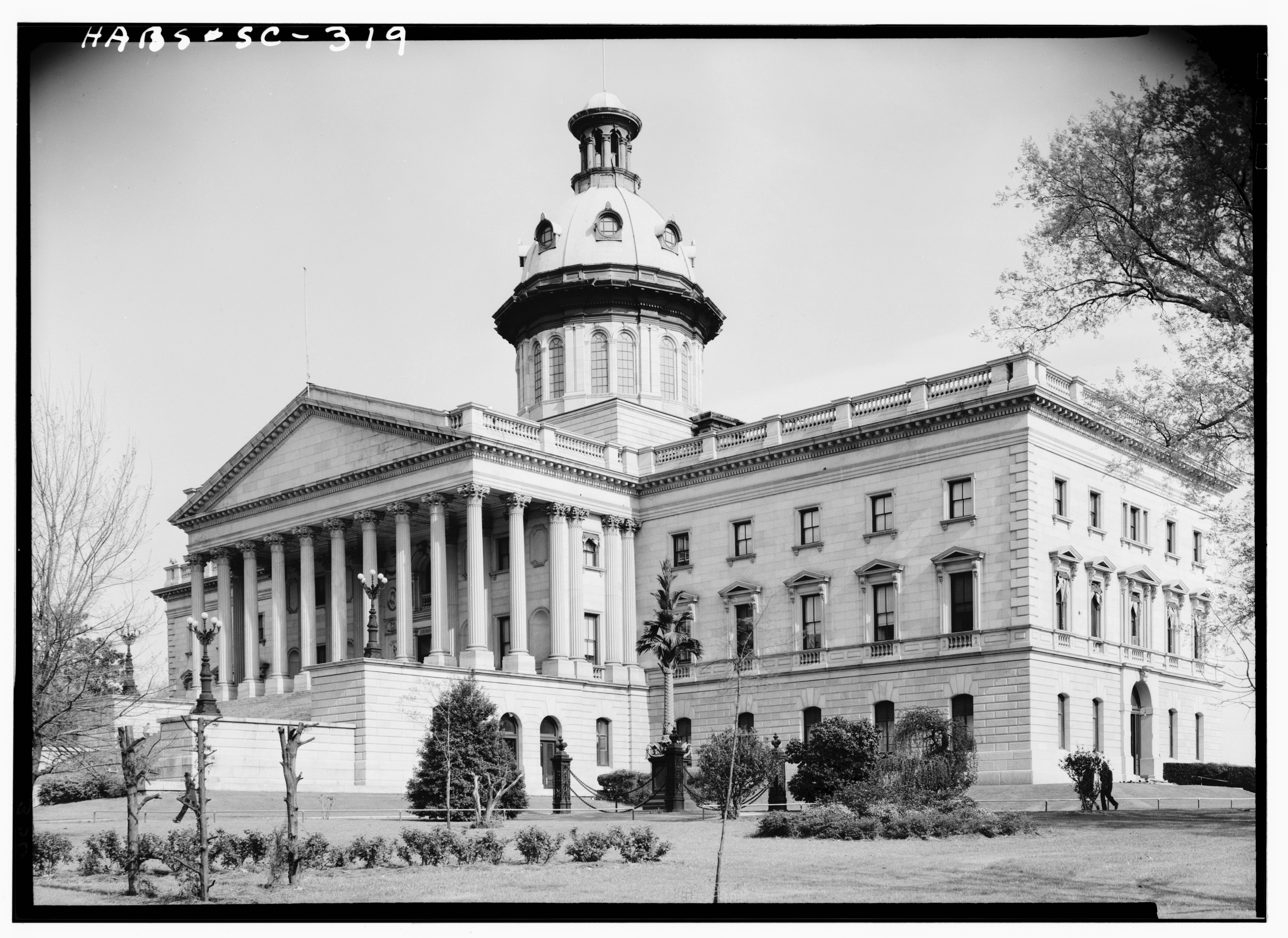
State Capitol, Columbia, South Carolina

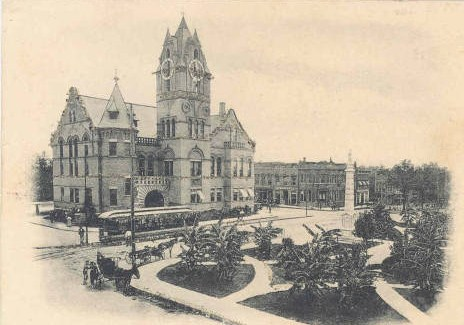
Anderson County Courthouse, South Carolina

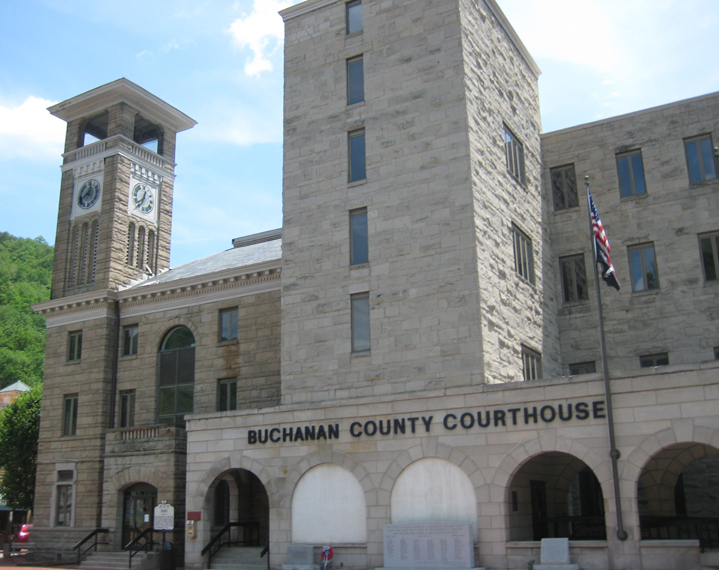
Buchanan County Courthouse, Grundy, Virginia

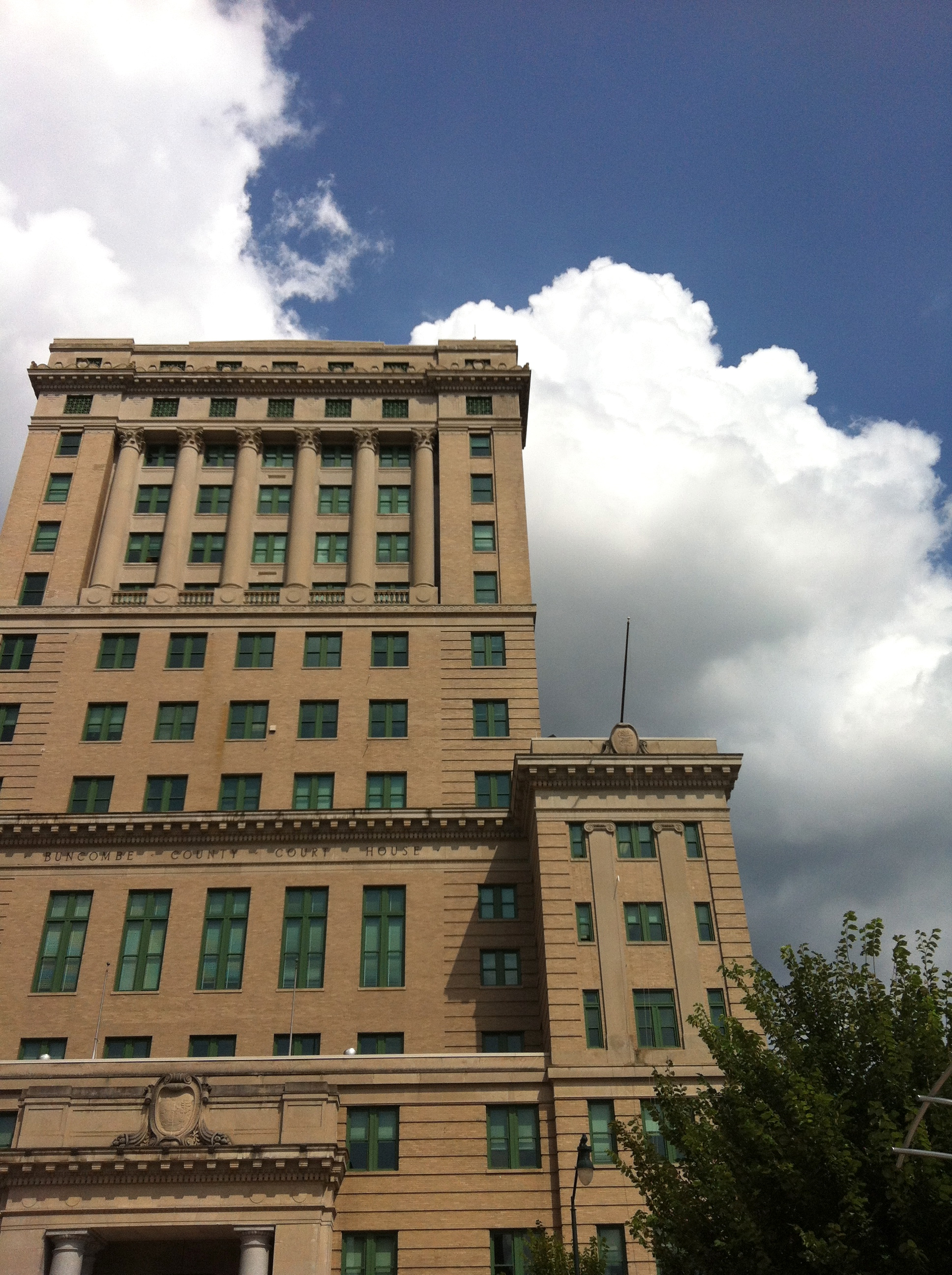
Buncombe County Courthouse, Asheville, North Carolina

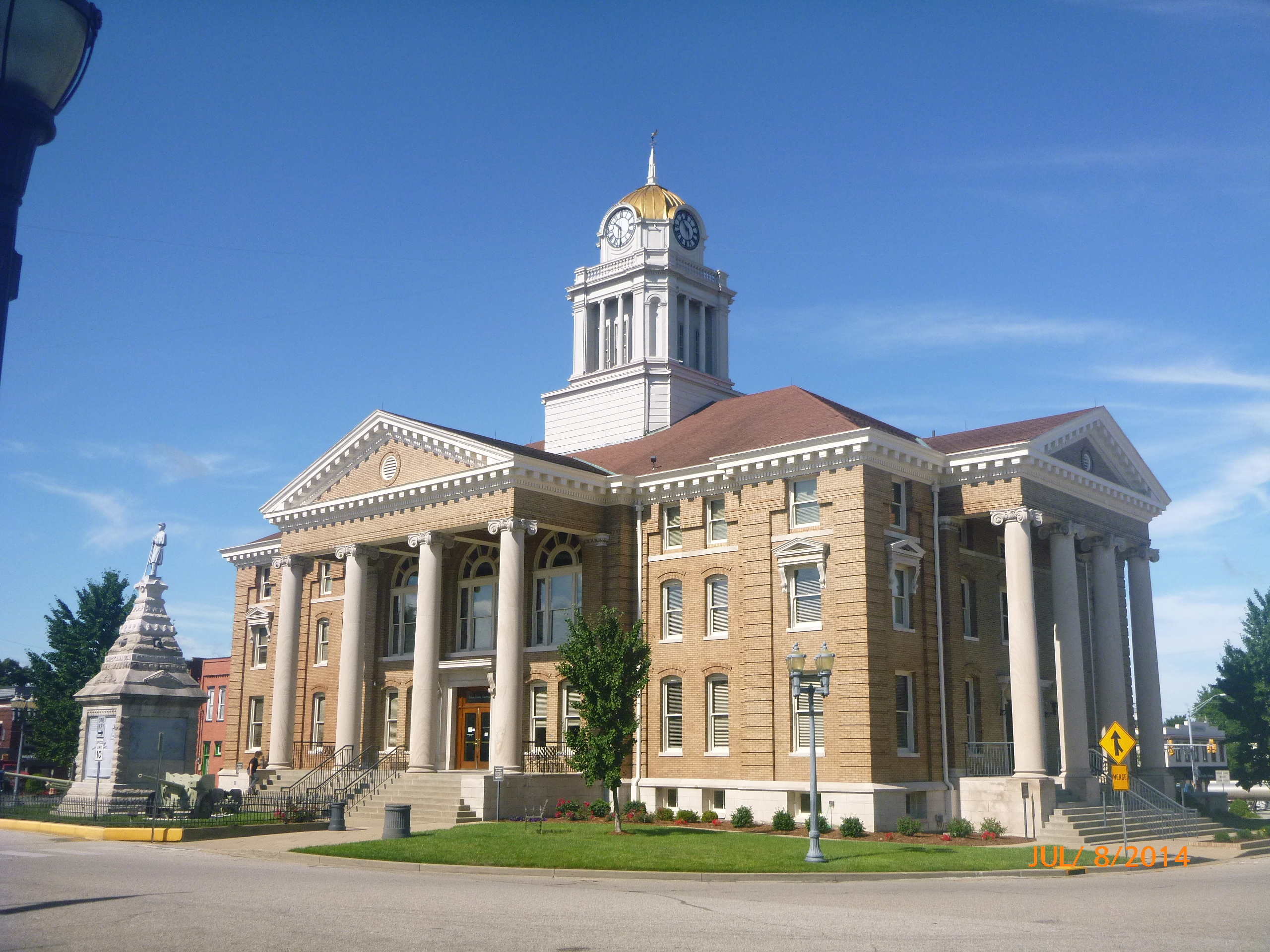
Dubois County Courthouse, Jasper, Indiana

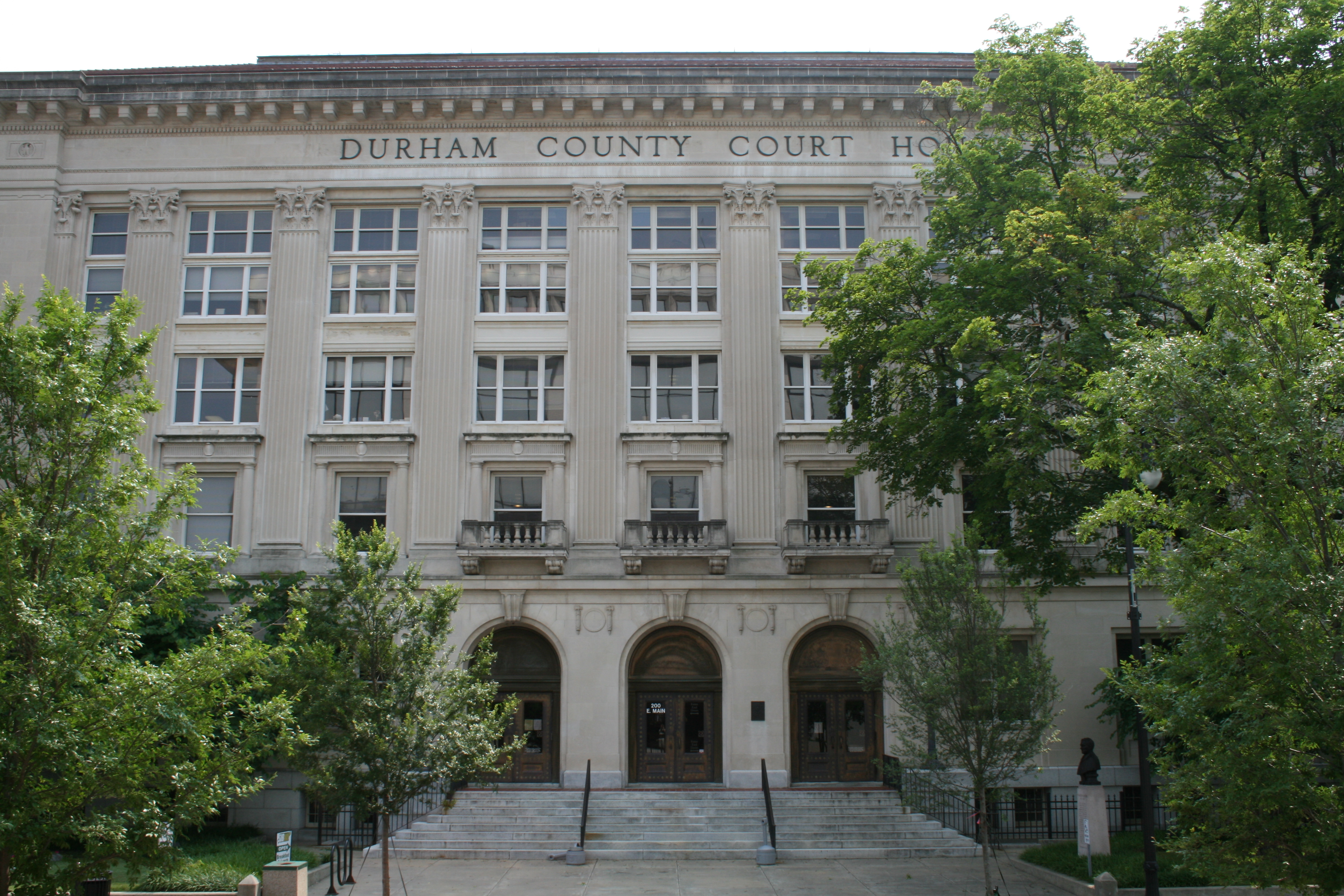
Durham County Courthouse, Durham, North Carolina

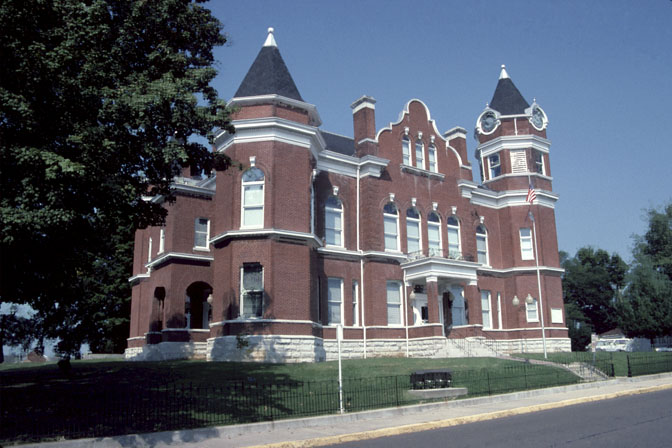
Fulton County Courthouse, Fulton, Kentucky

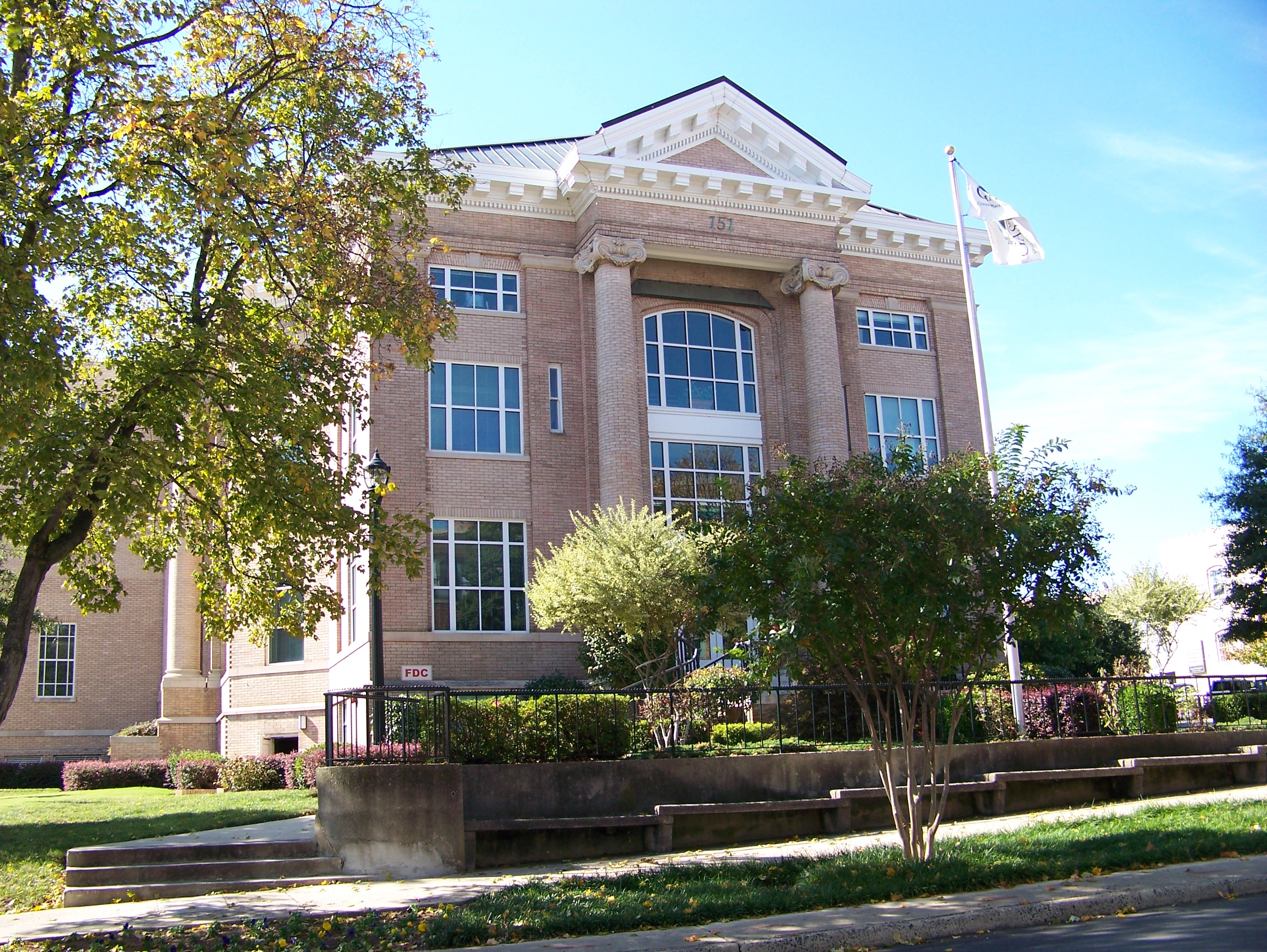
Gaston County Courthouse, Gastonia, North Carolina

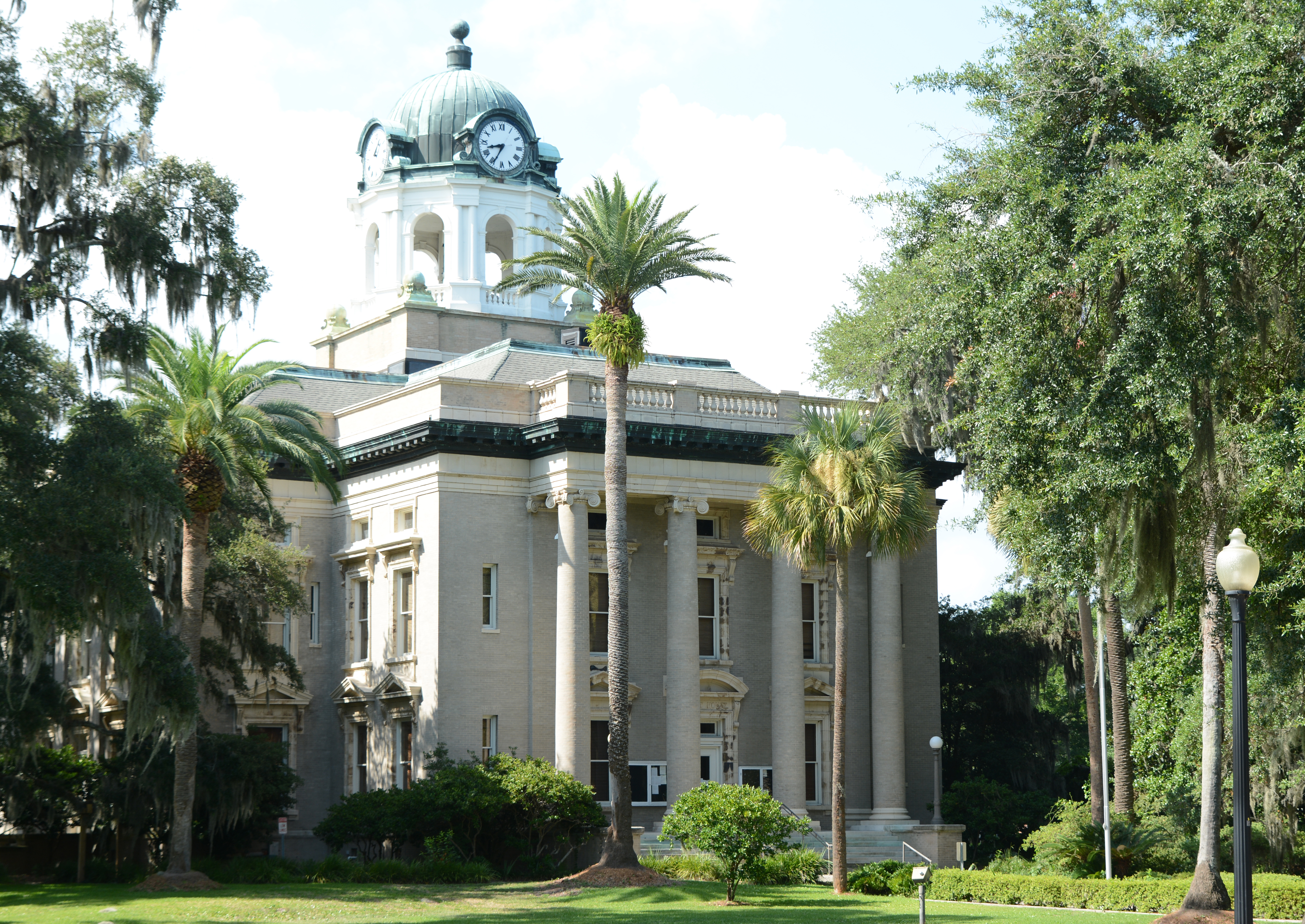
Glynn County Courthouse, Brunswick, Georgia

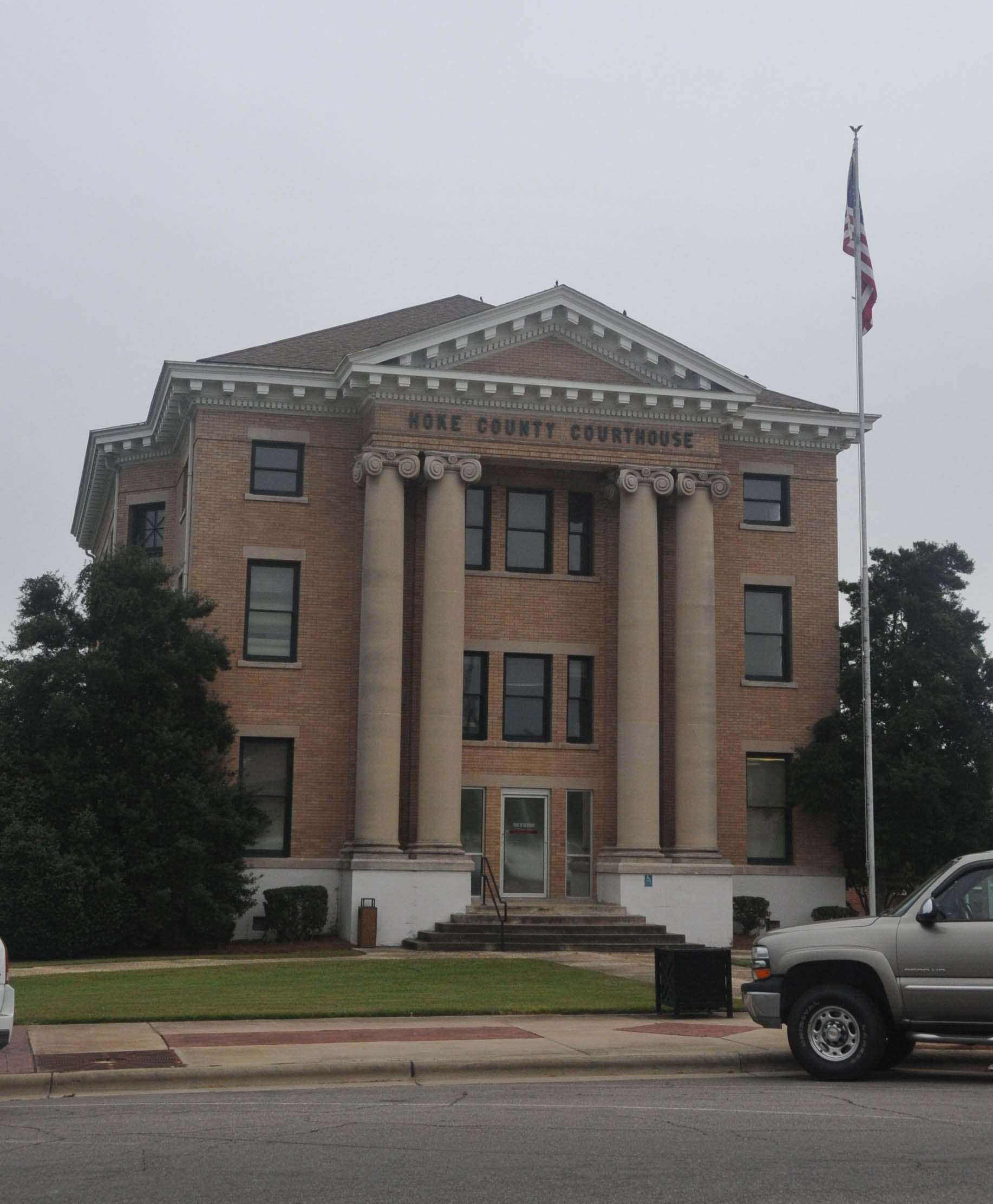
Hoke County Courthouse, Raeford, North Carolina

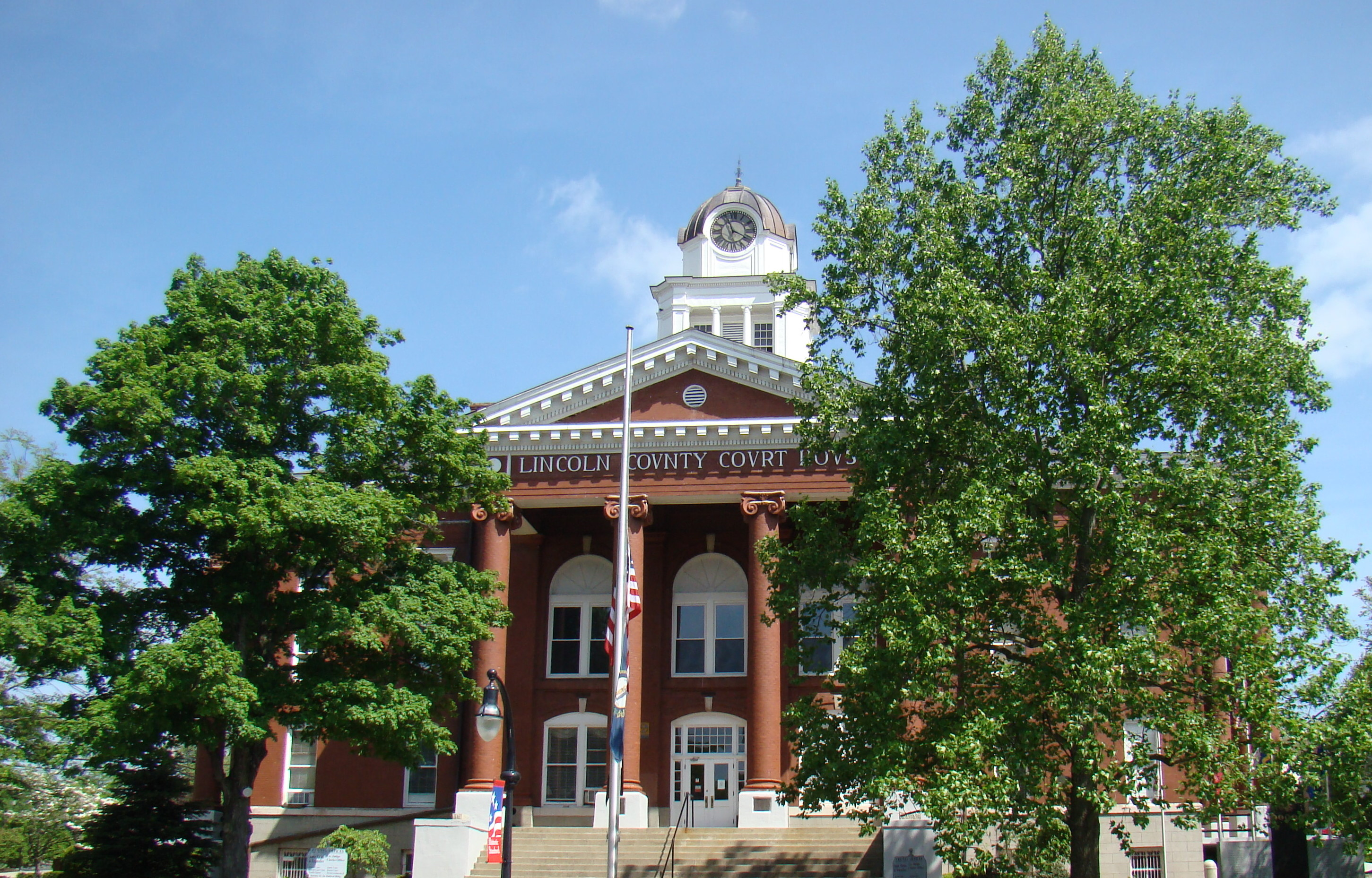
Lincoln County Courthouse, Stanford, Kentucky

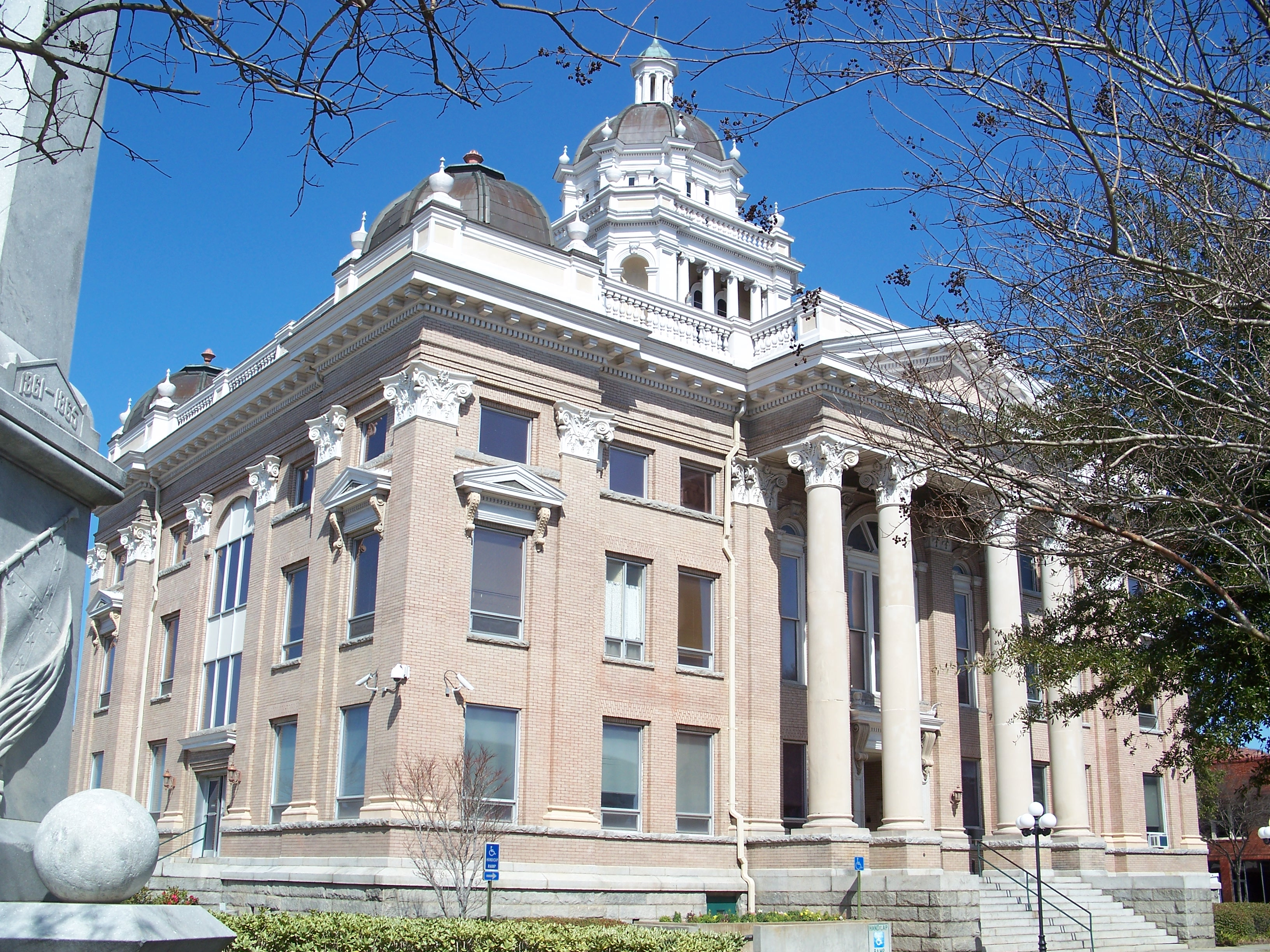
Lowndes County Courthouse, Valdosta, Georgia

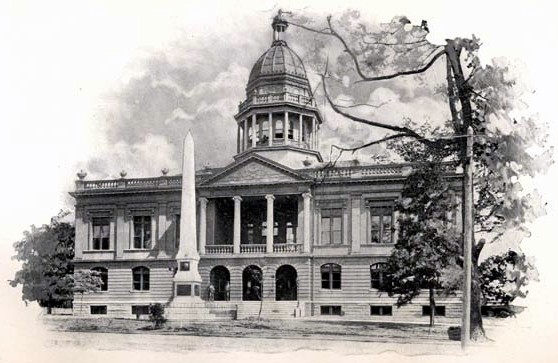
Mecklenburg County Courthouse, Charlotte, North Carolina

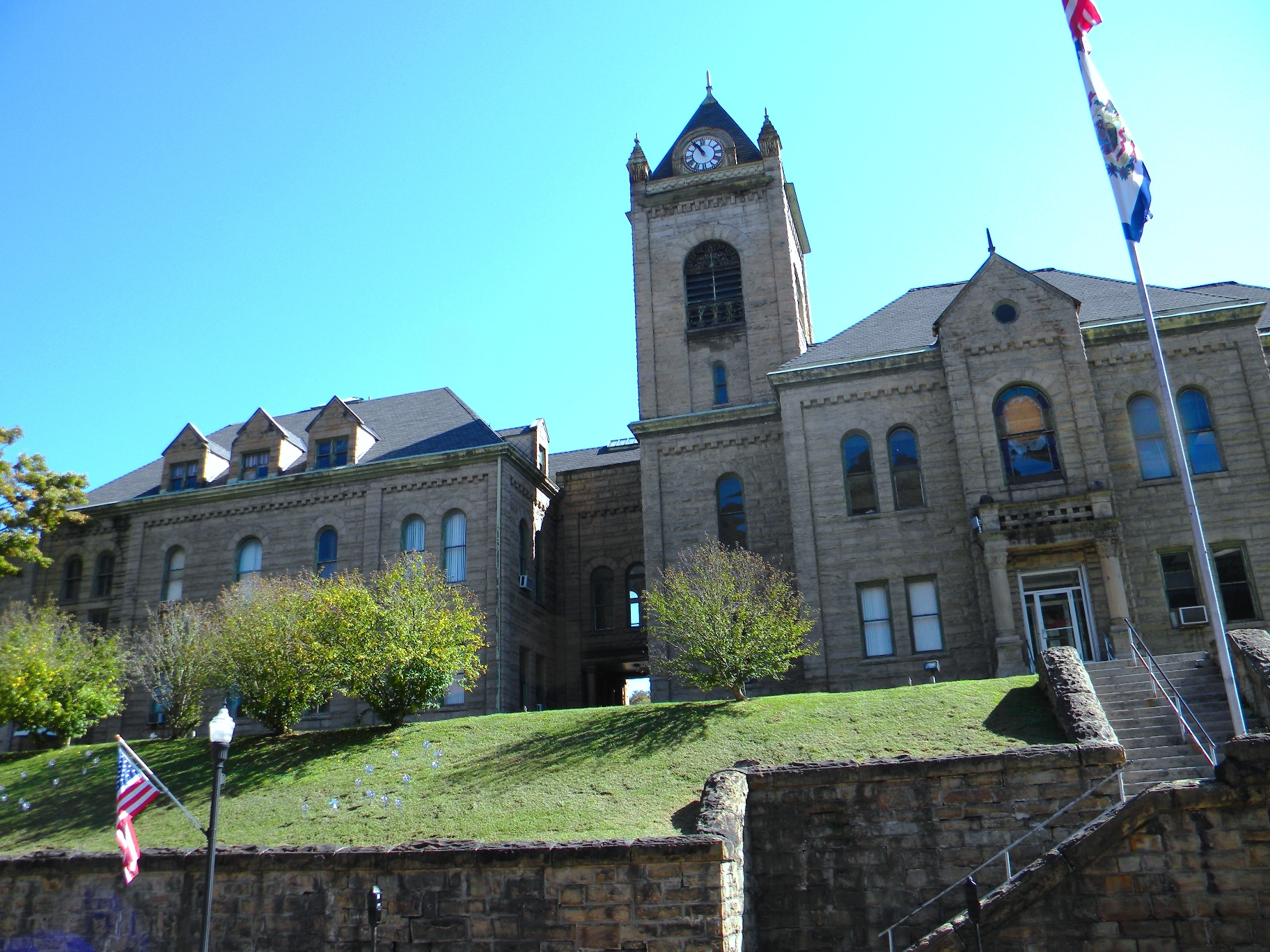
McDowell County Courthouse and jail, Welch, West Virginia

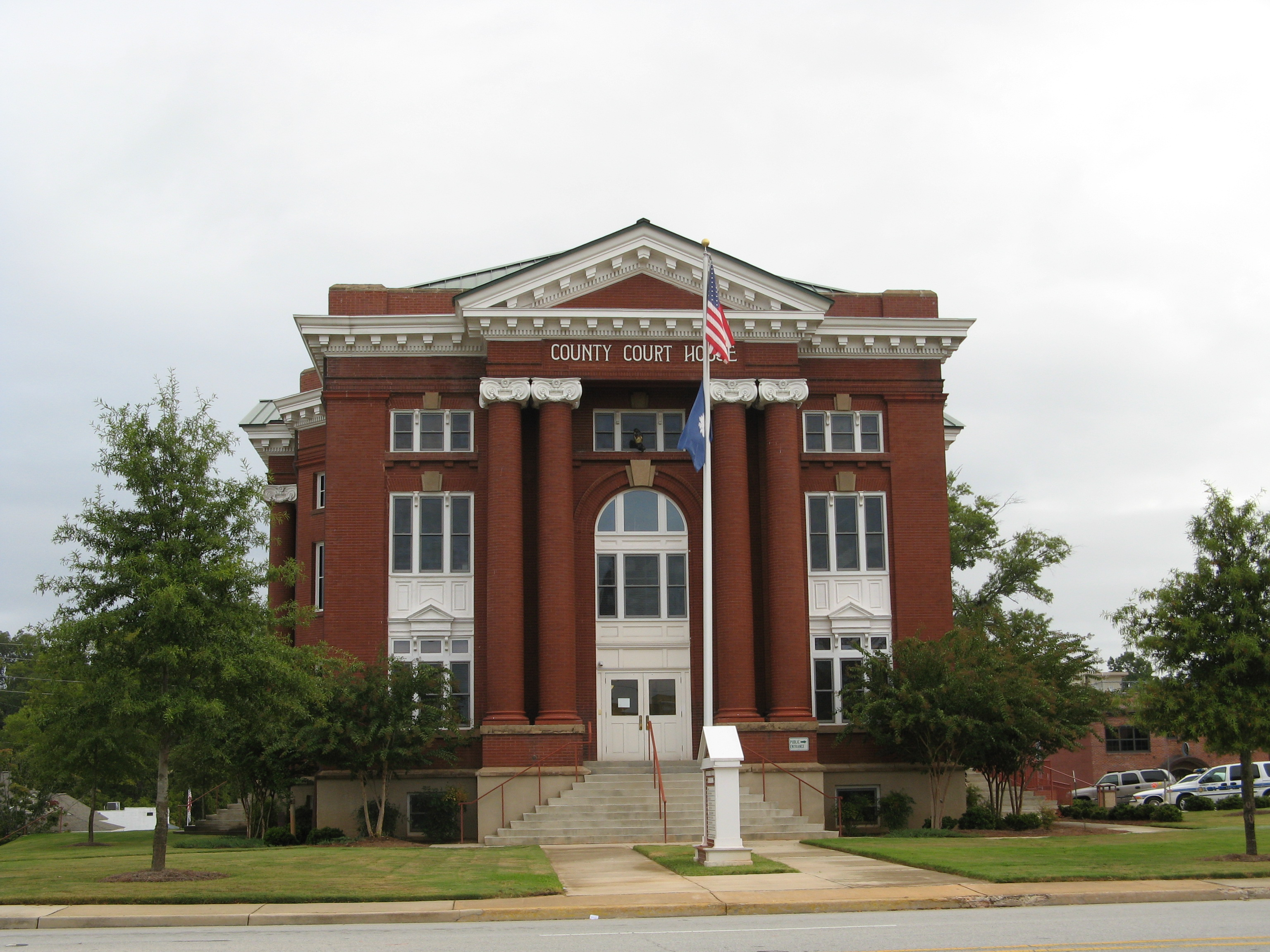
Newberry County Courthouse, Newberry, South Carolina

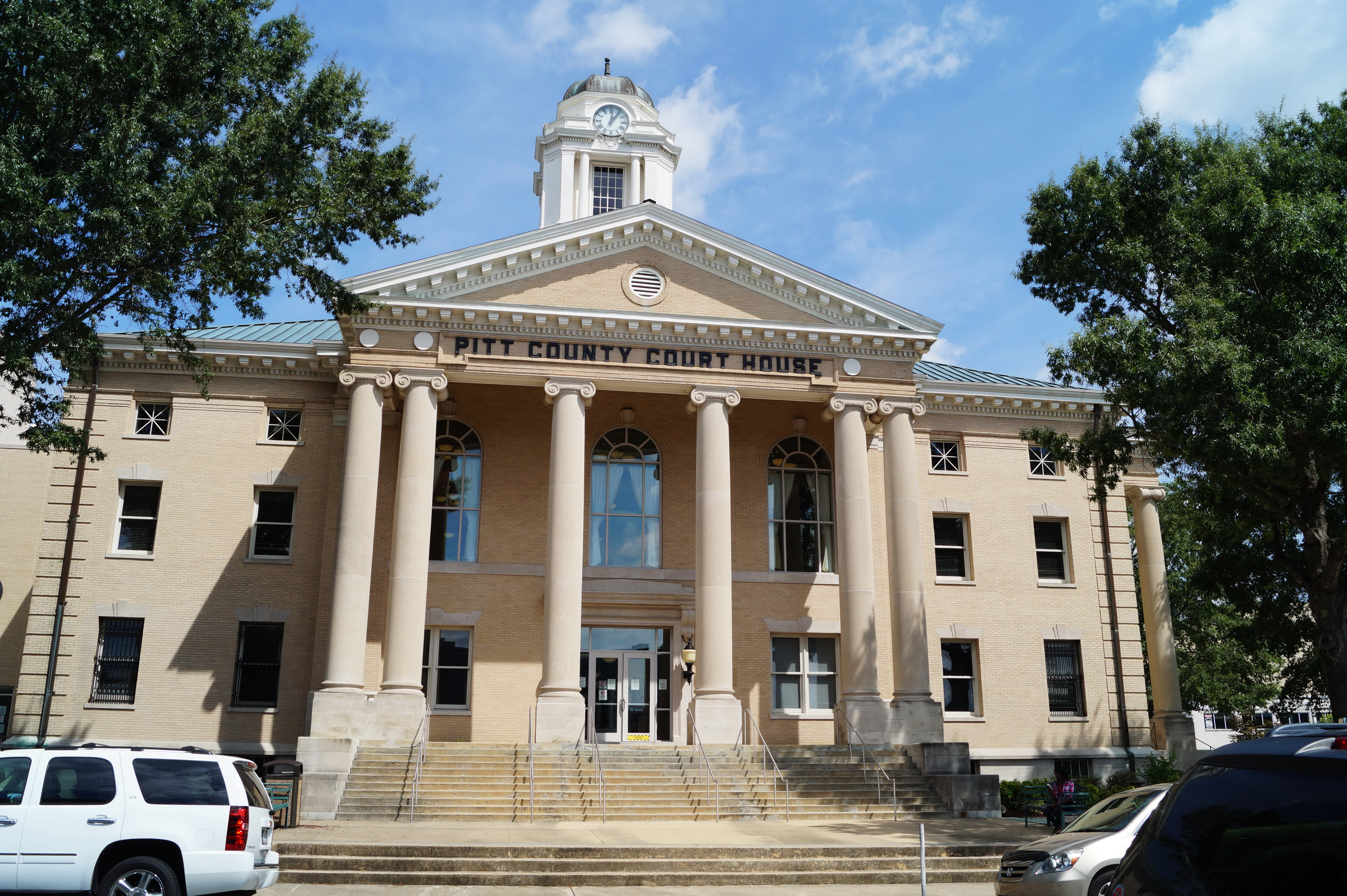
Pitt County Courthouse, Greenville, North Carolina

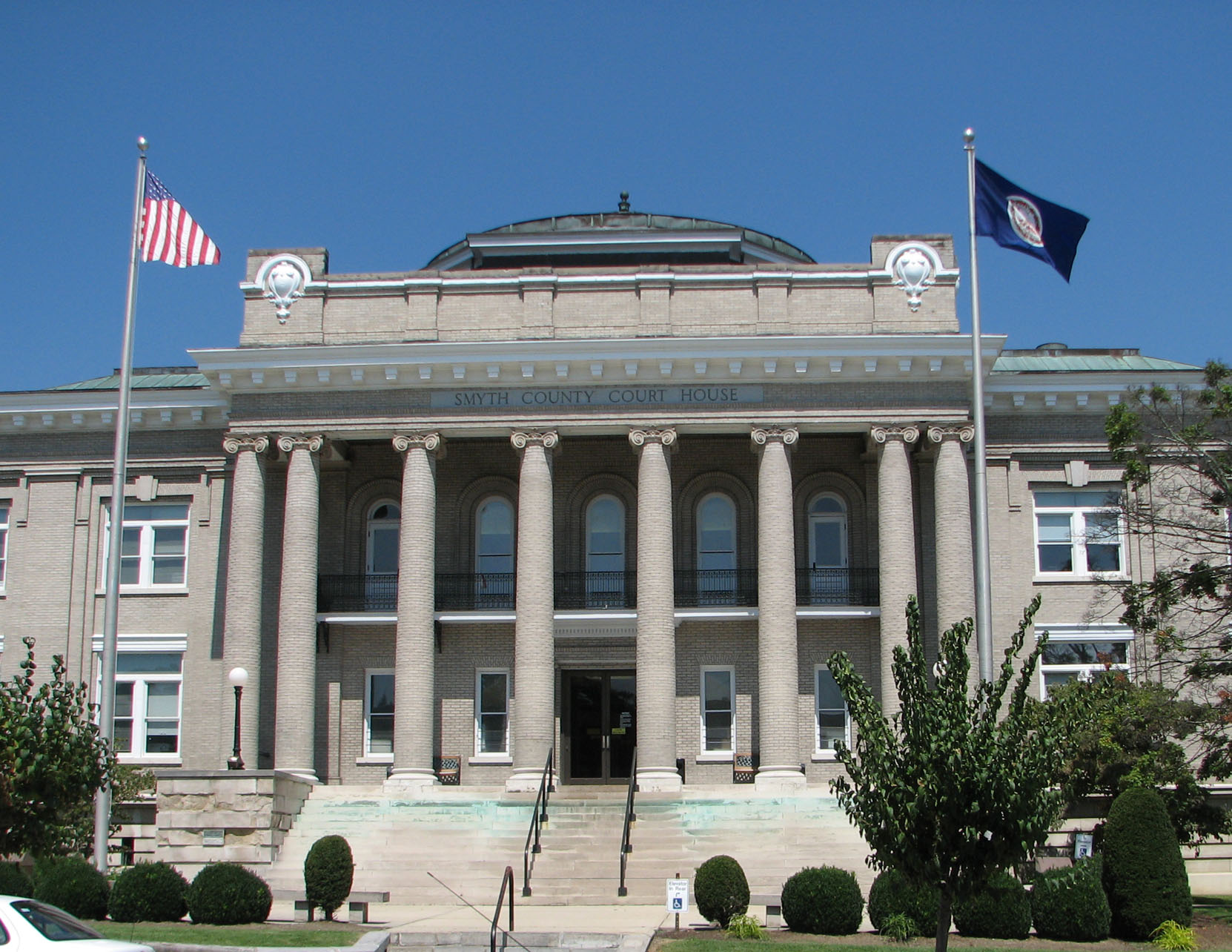
Smyth County Courthouse Marion, Virginia

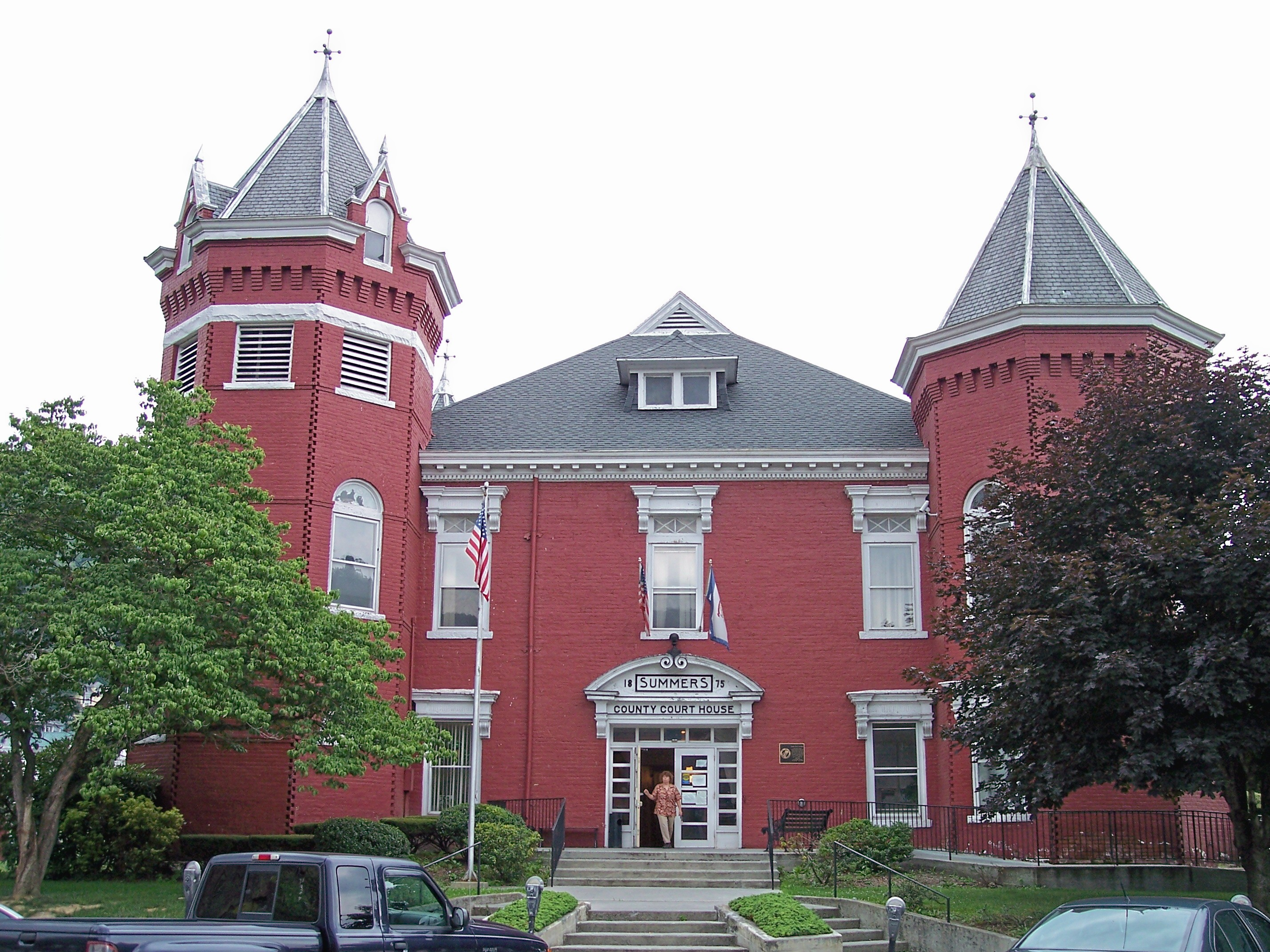
Summers County Courthouse, Hinton, West Virginia

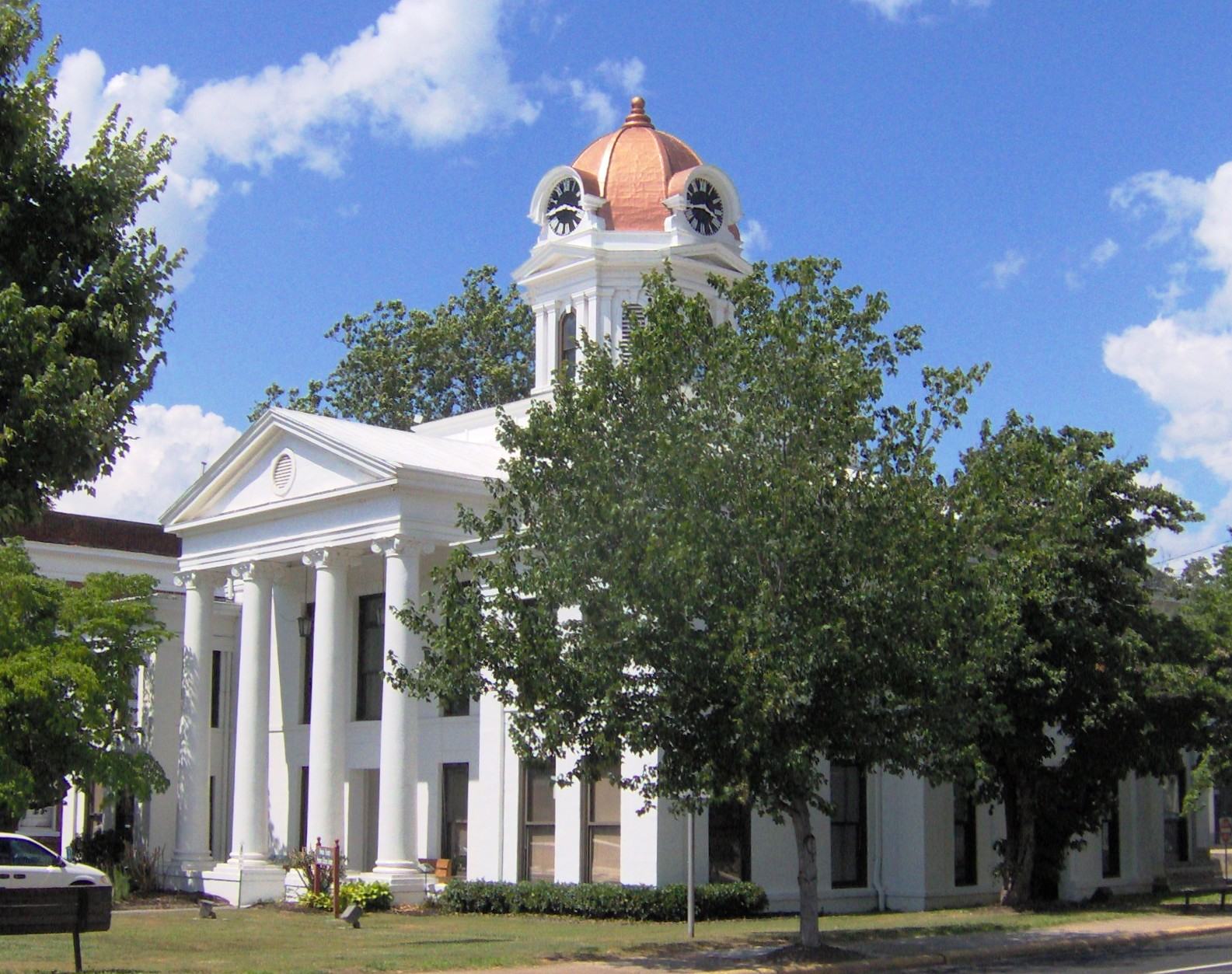
Swain County Courthouse, Bryson City, NC

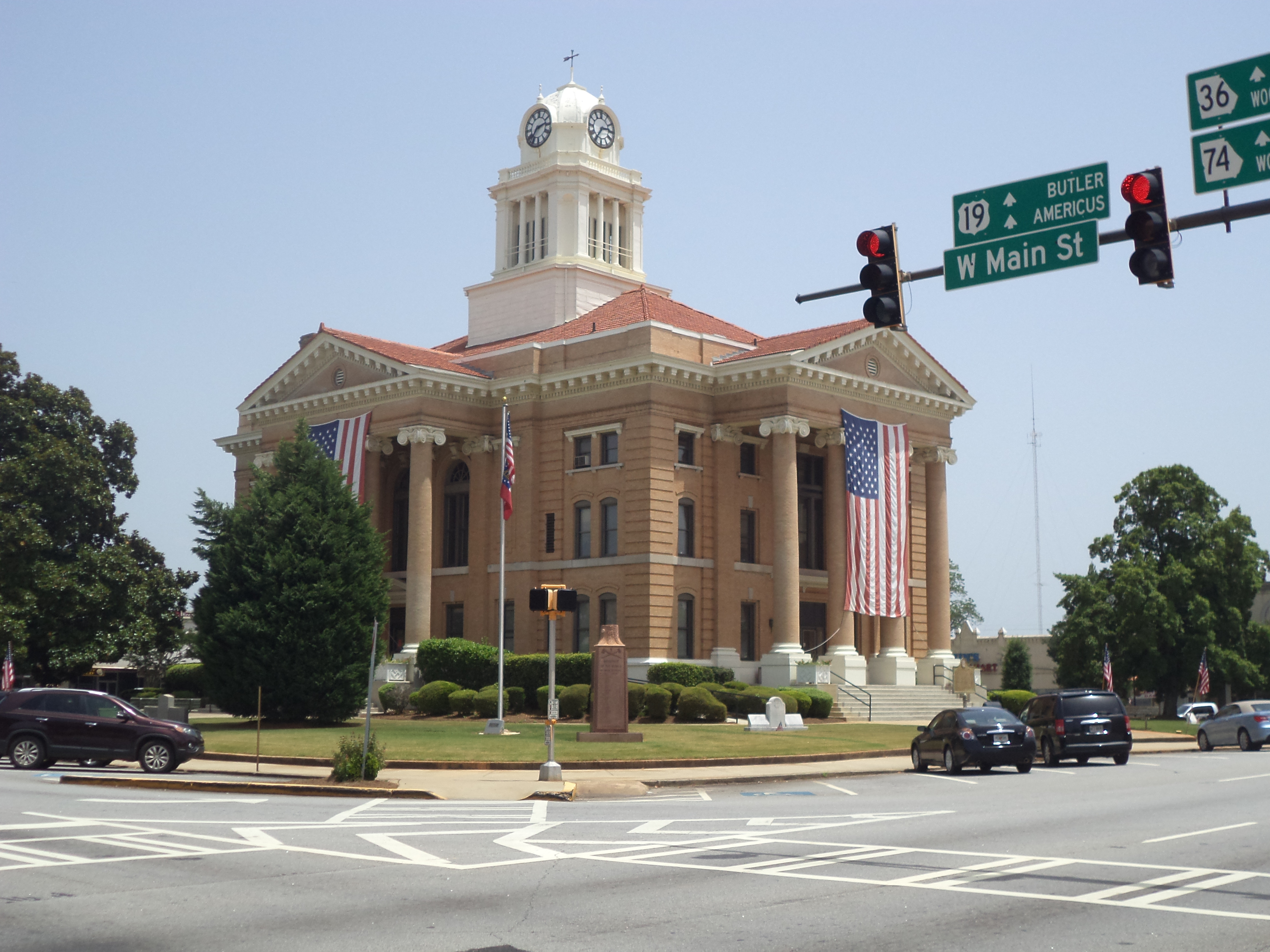
Upson County Courthouse, Thomaston, Georgia

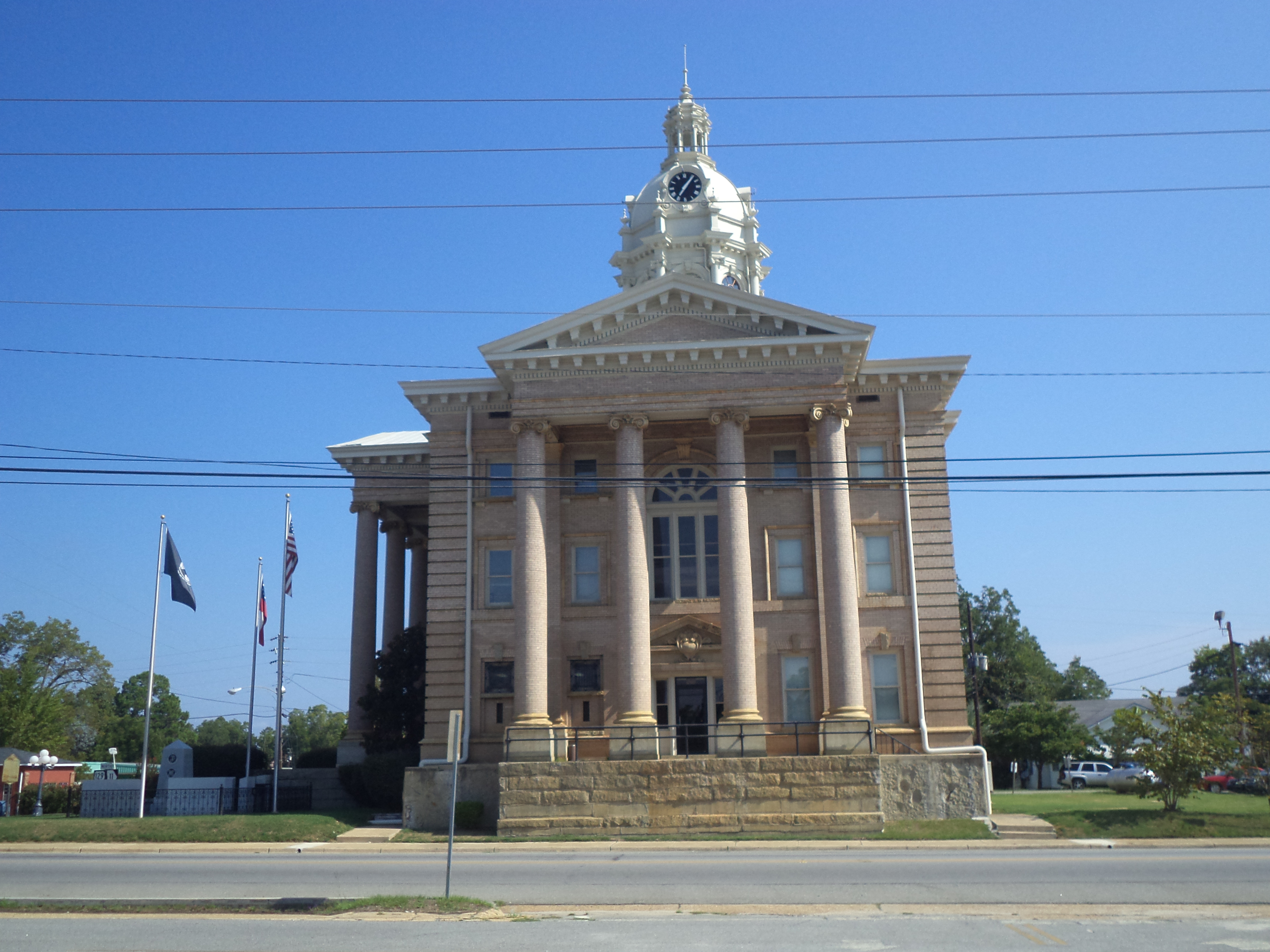
Wilcox County Courthouse, Abbeville, Georgia

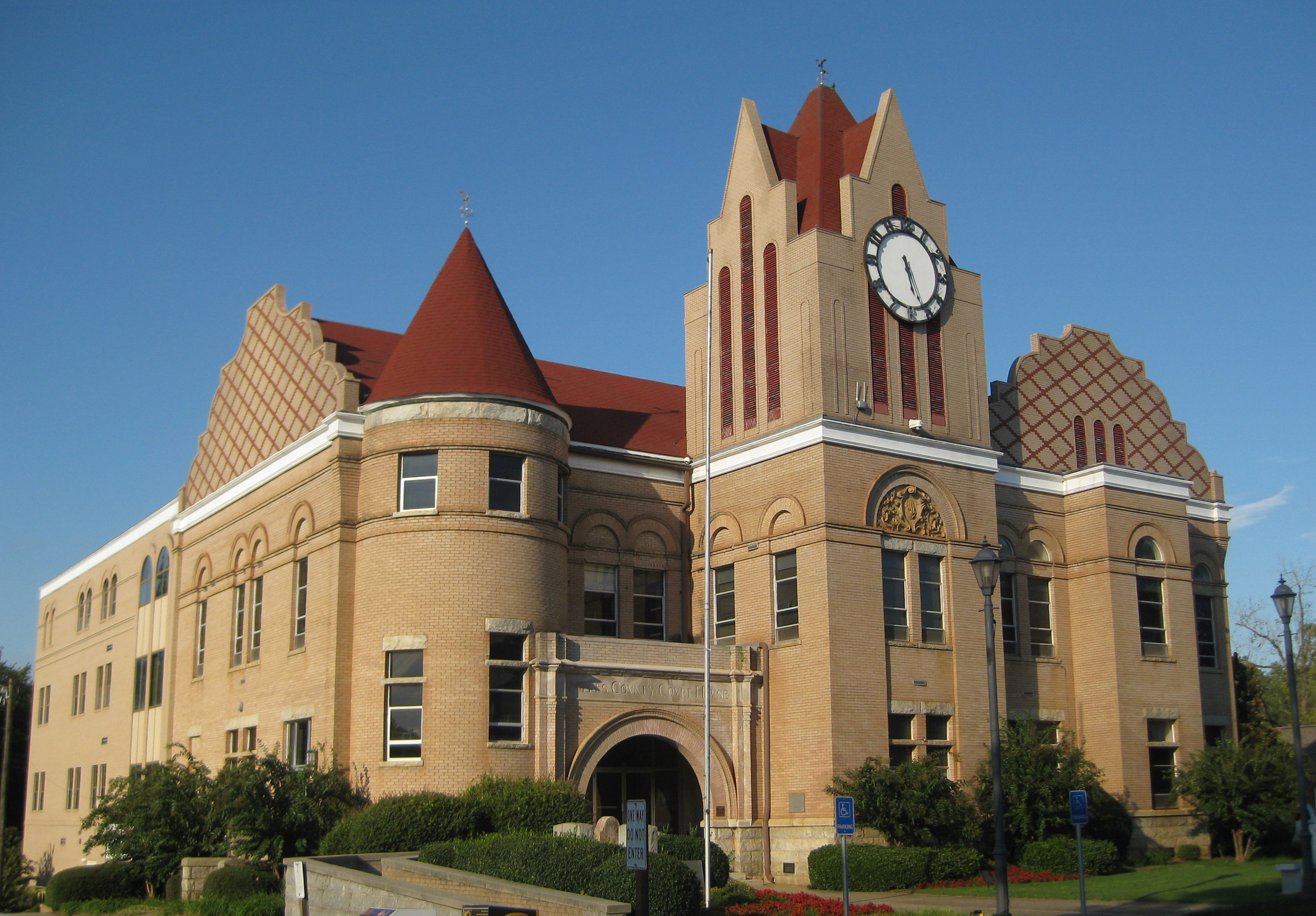
Wilkes County Courthouse, Washington, Georgia

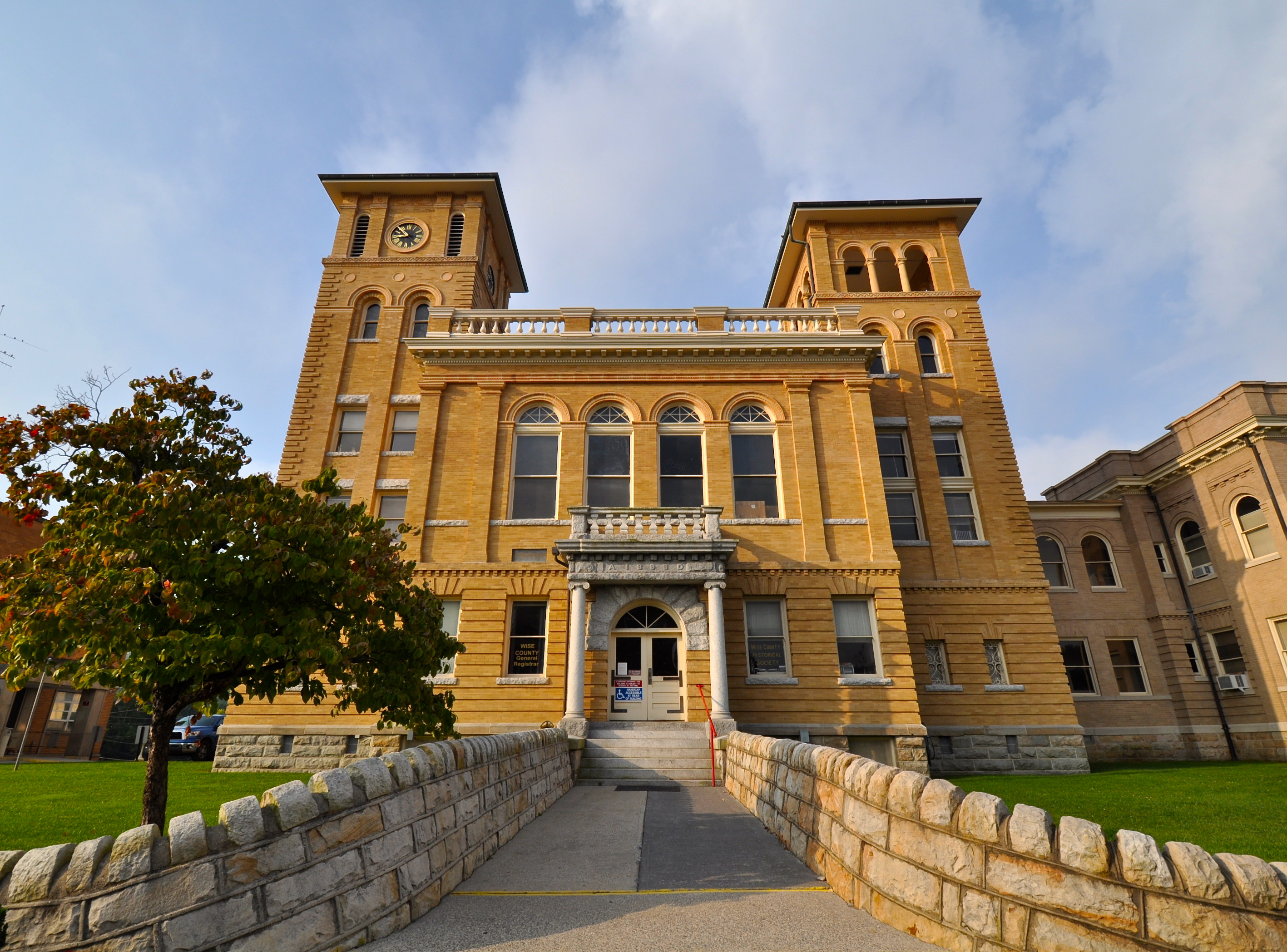
Wise County Courthouse, Wise, Virginia

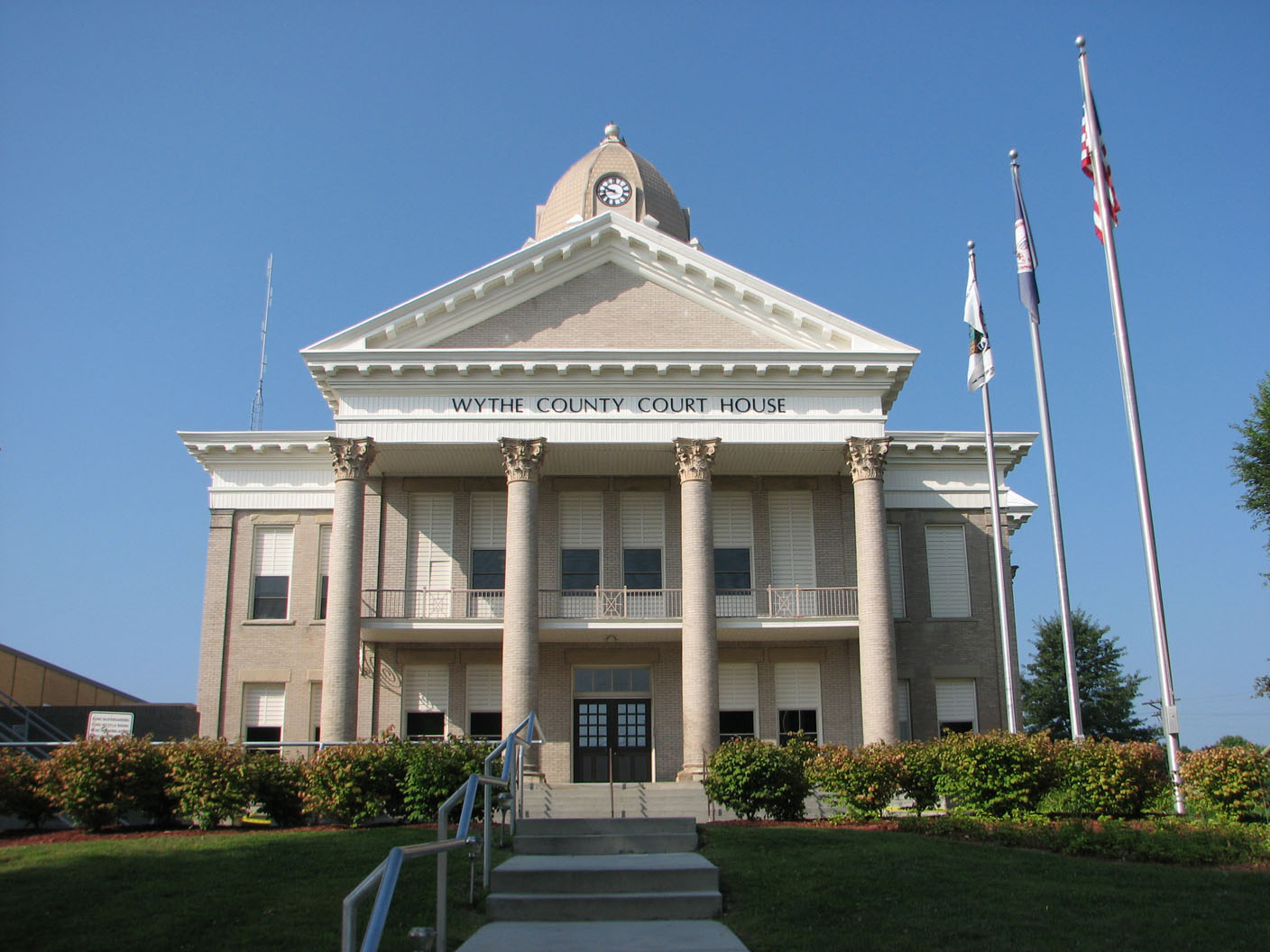
Wythe County Courthouse, Wytheville, Virginia

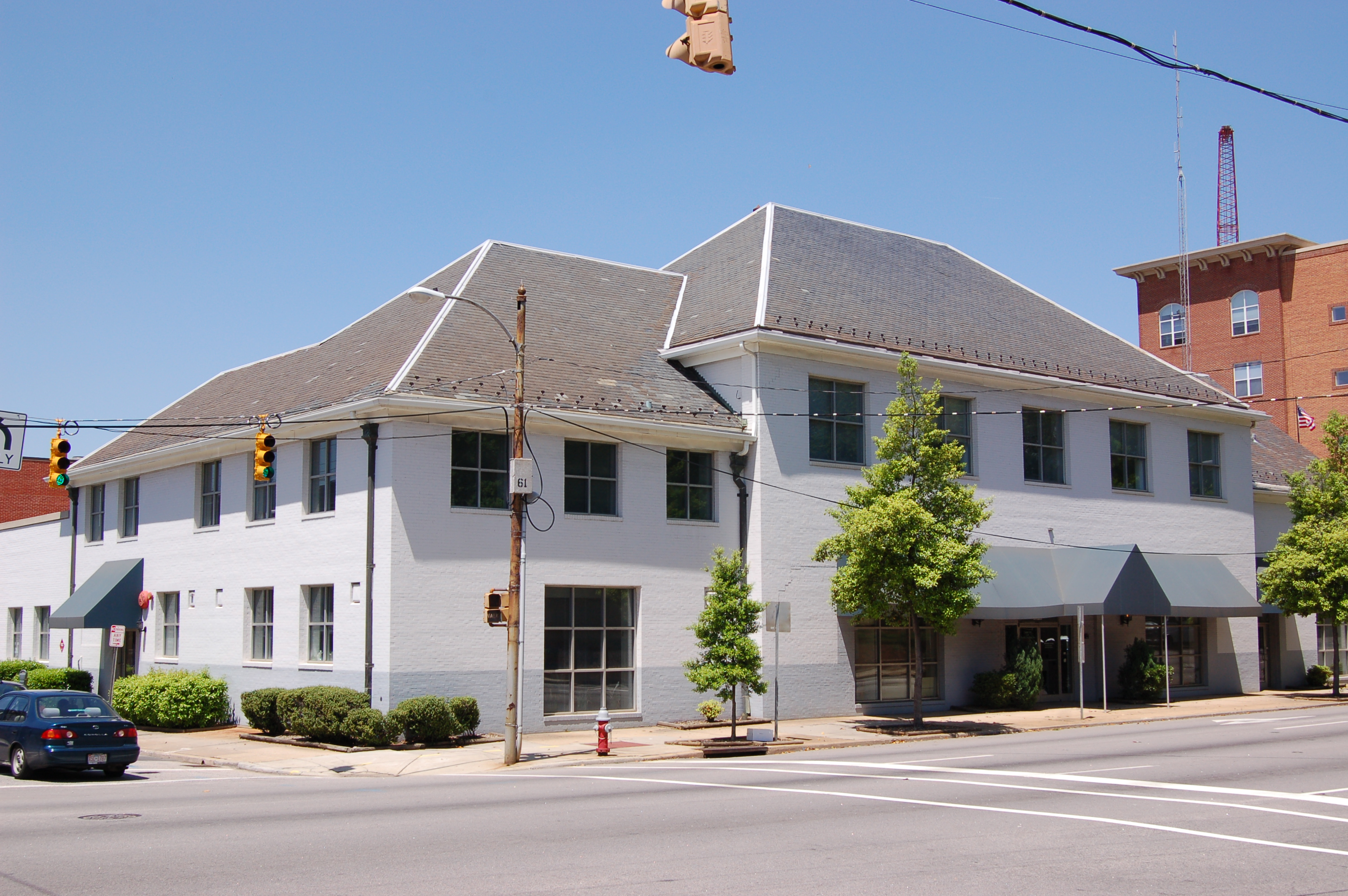
Union Station, Raleigh, North Carolina

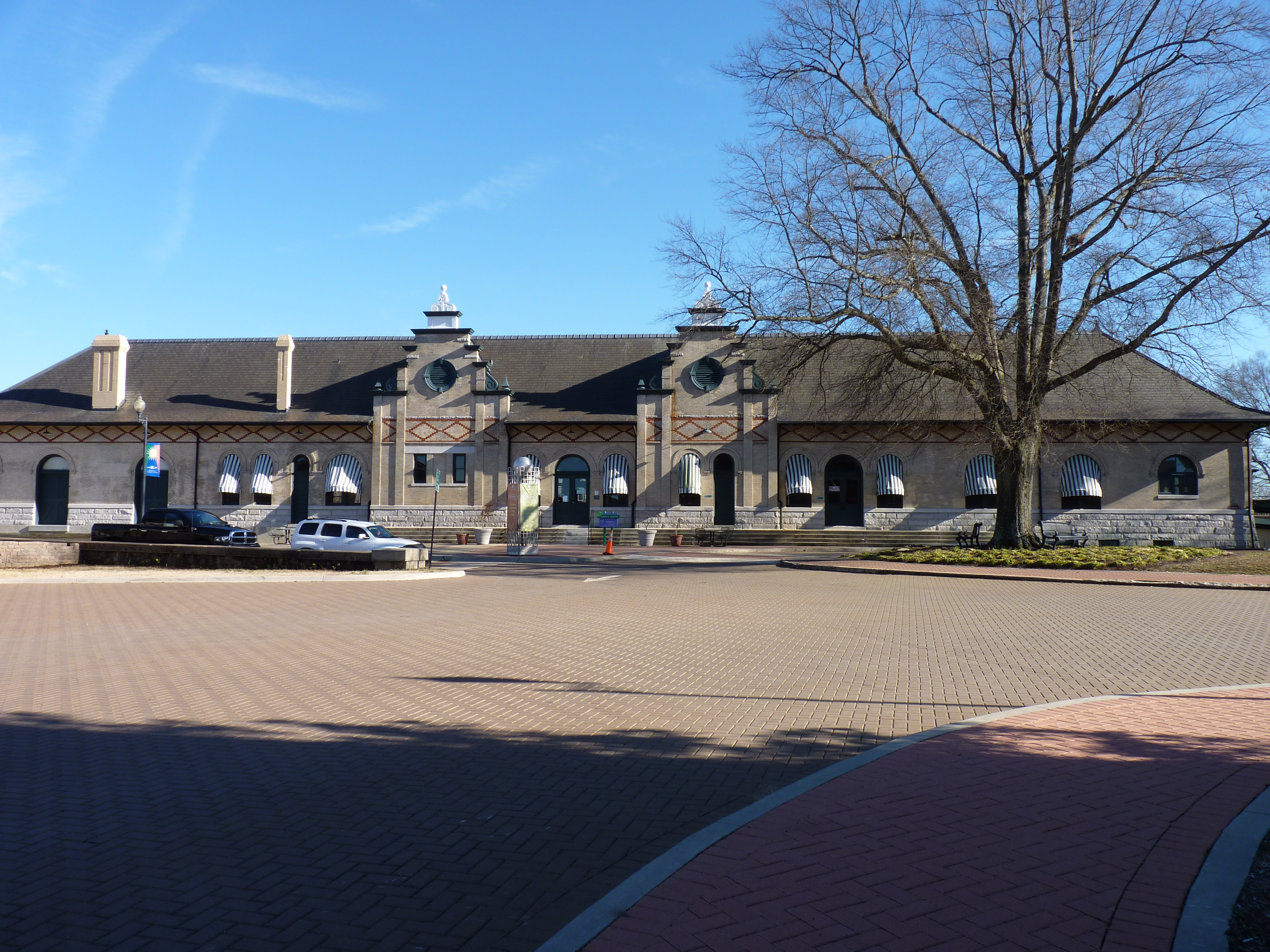
Southern Railway Station, Danville, Virginia

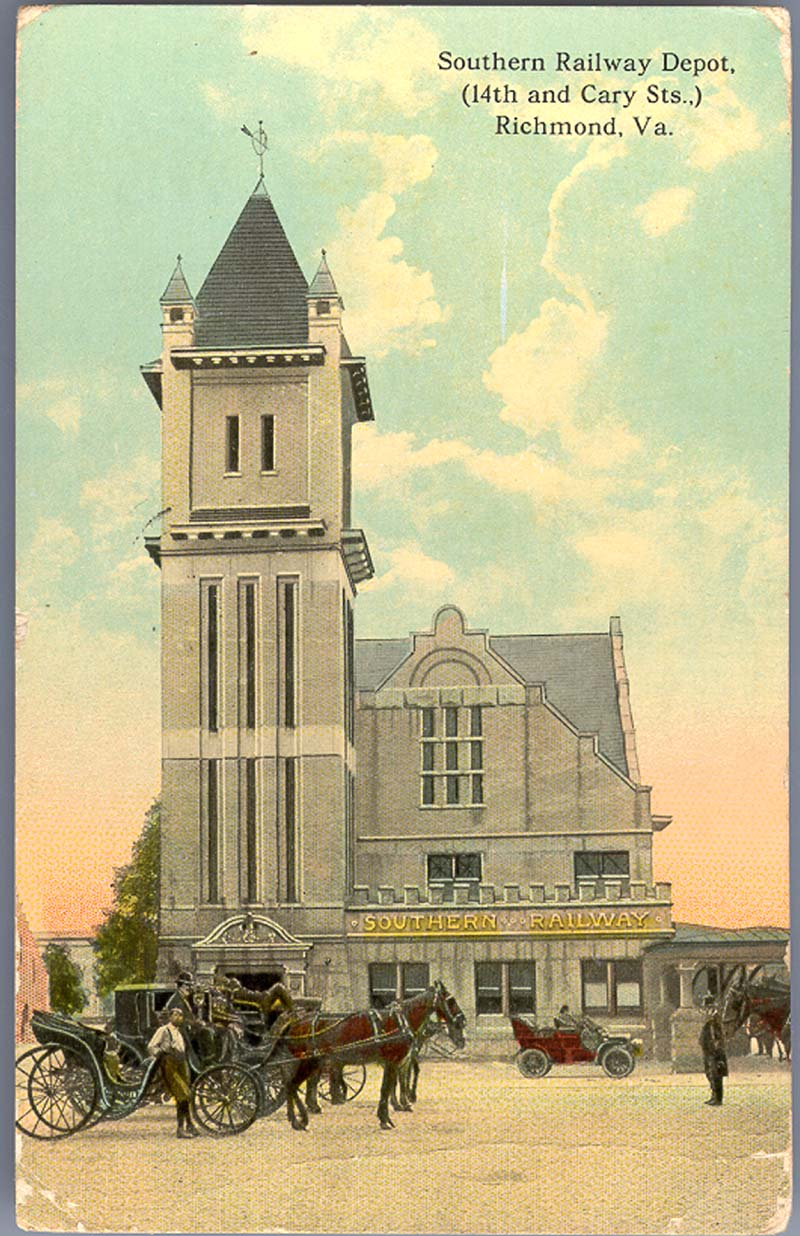
Southern Railway Station, Richmond, Virginia

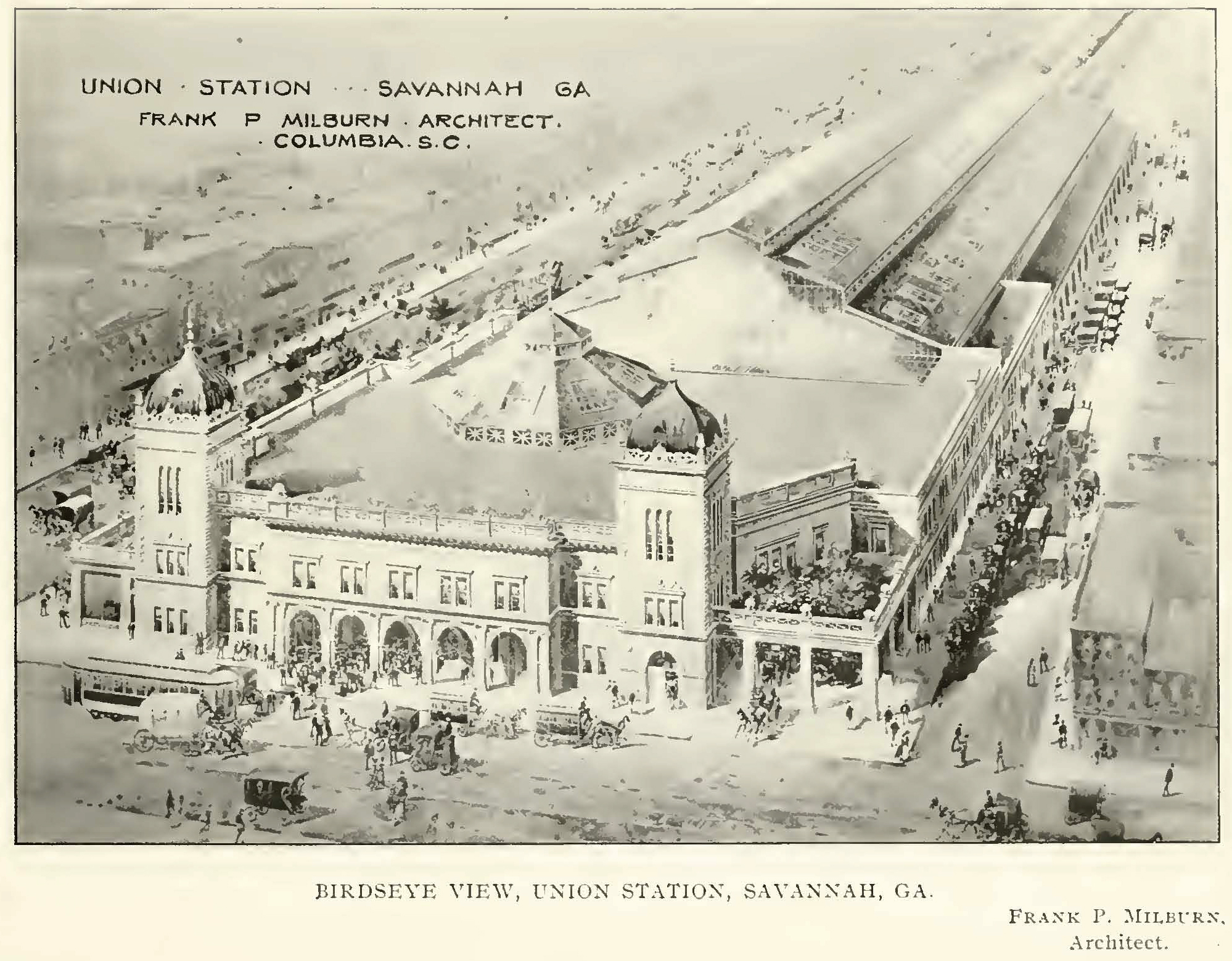
Union Station, Savannah, Georgia

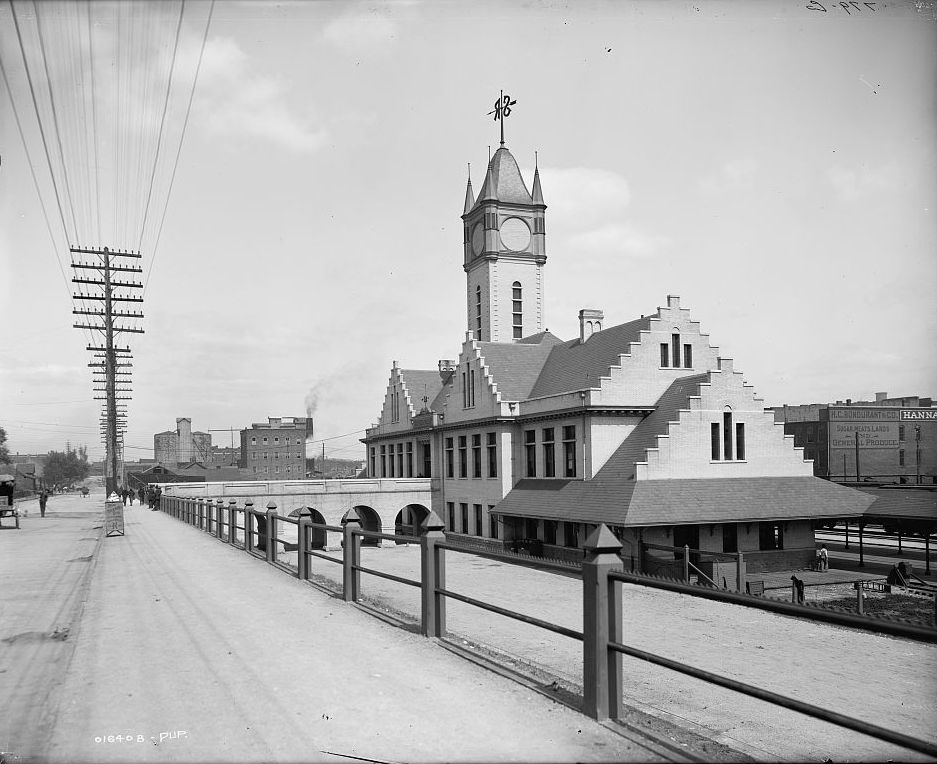
Southern Railway Terminal, Knoxville, Tennessee

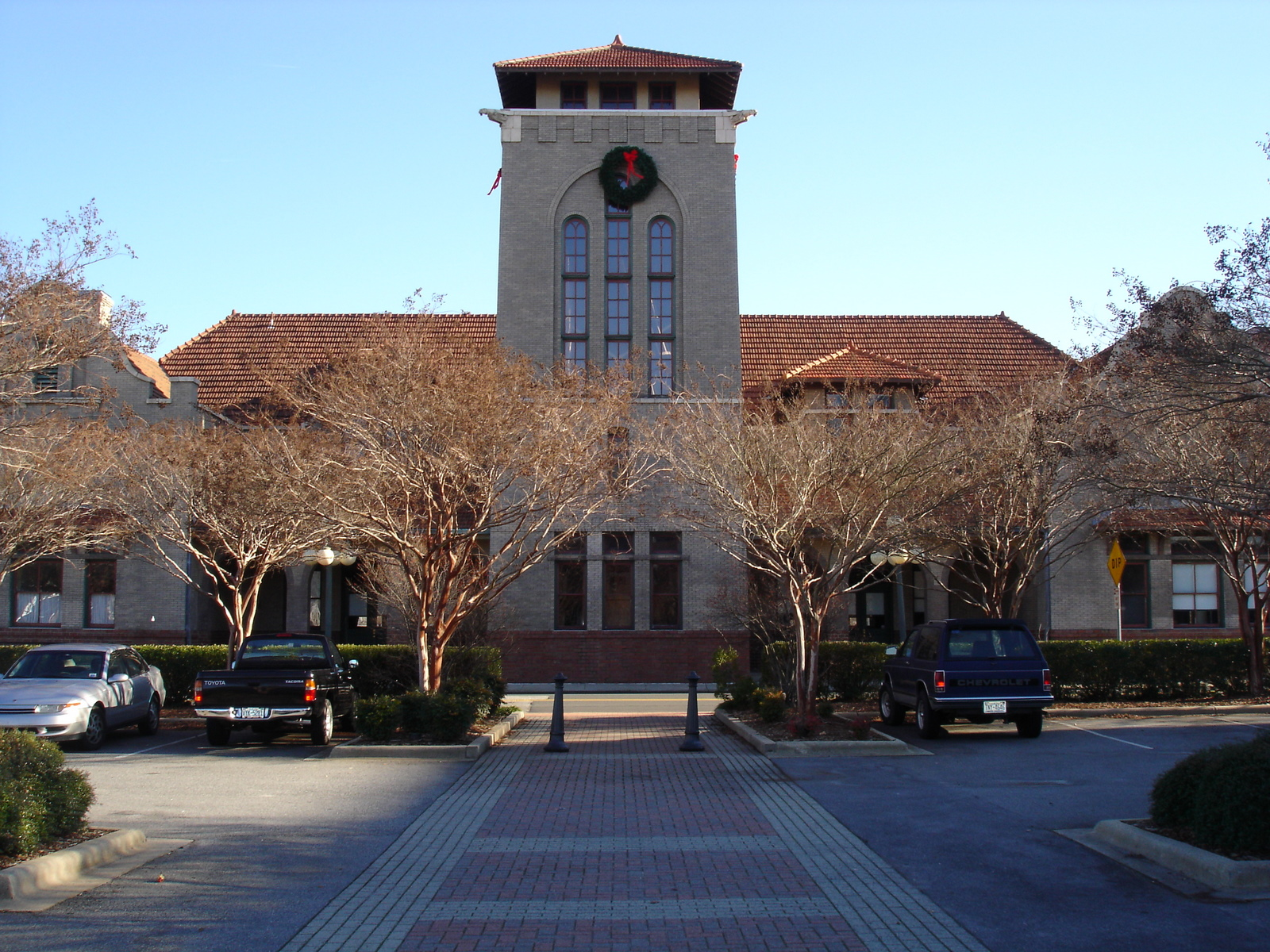
Southern Railway Station, Salisbury, North Carolina

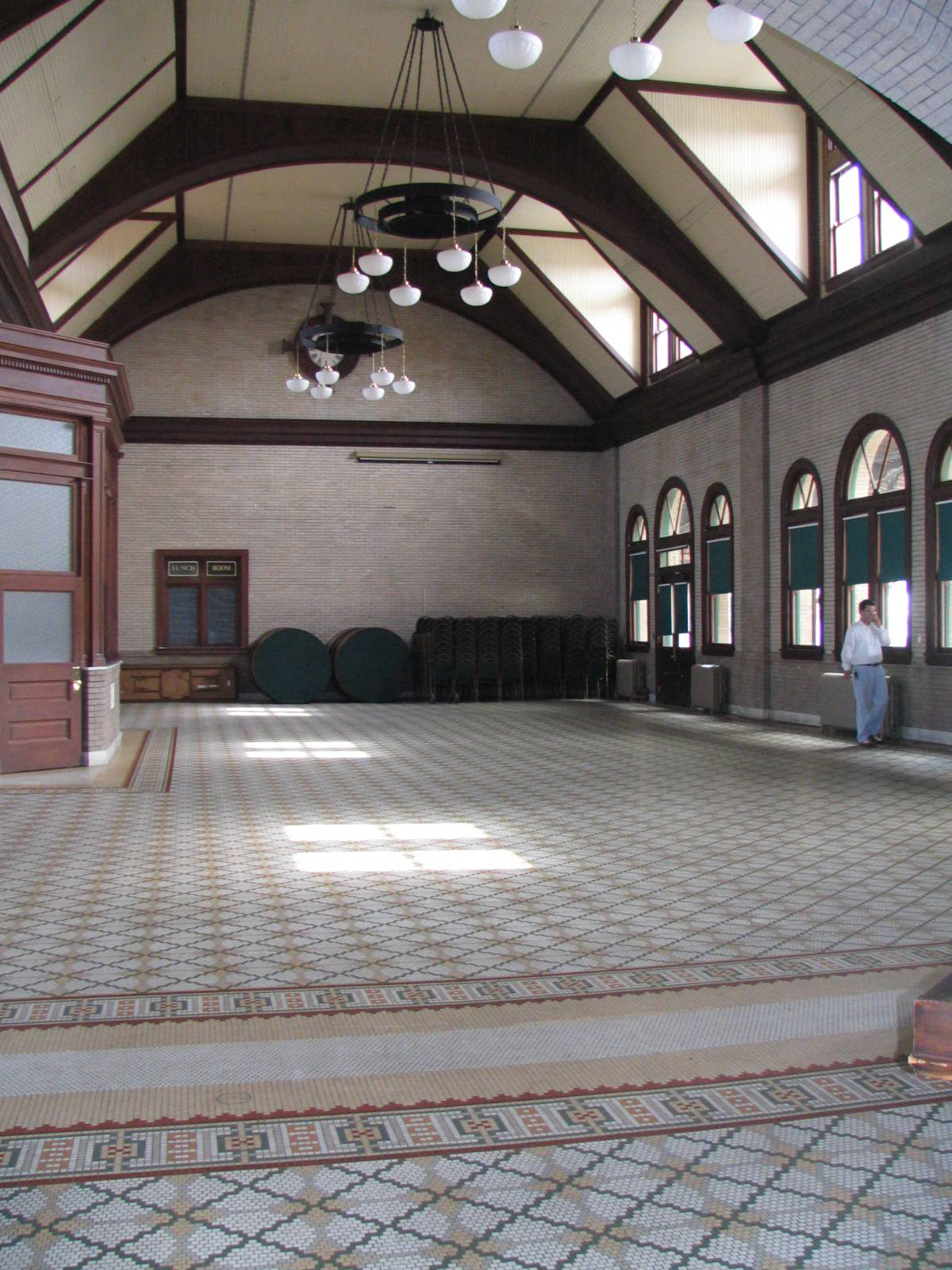
Southern Railway Station interior, Salisbury, North Carolina

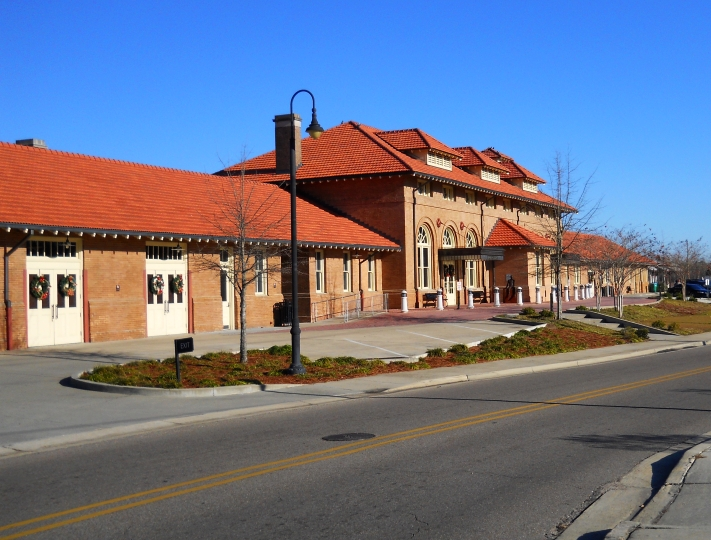
Union Depot, Hattiesburg, Mississippi

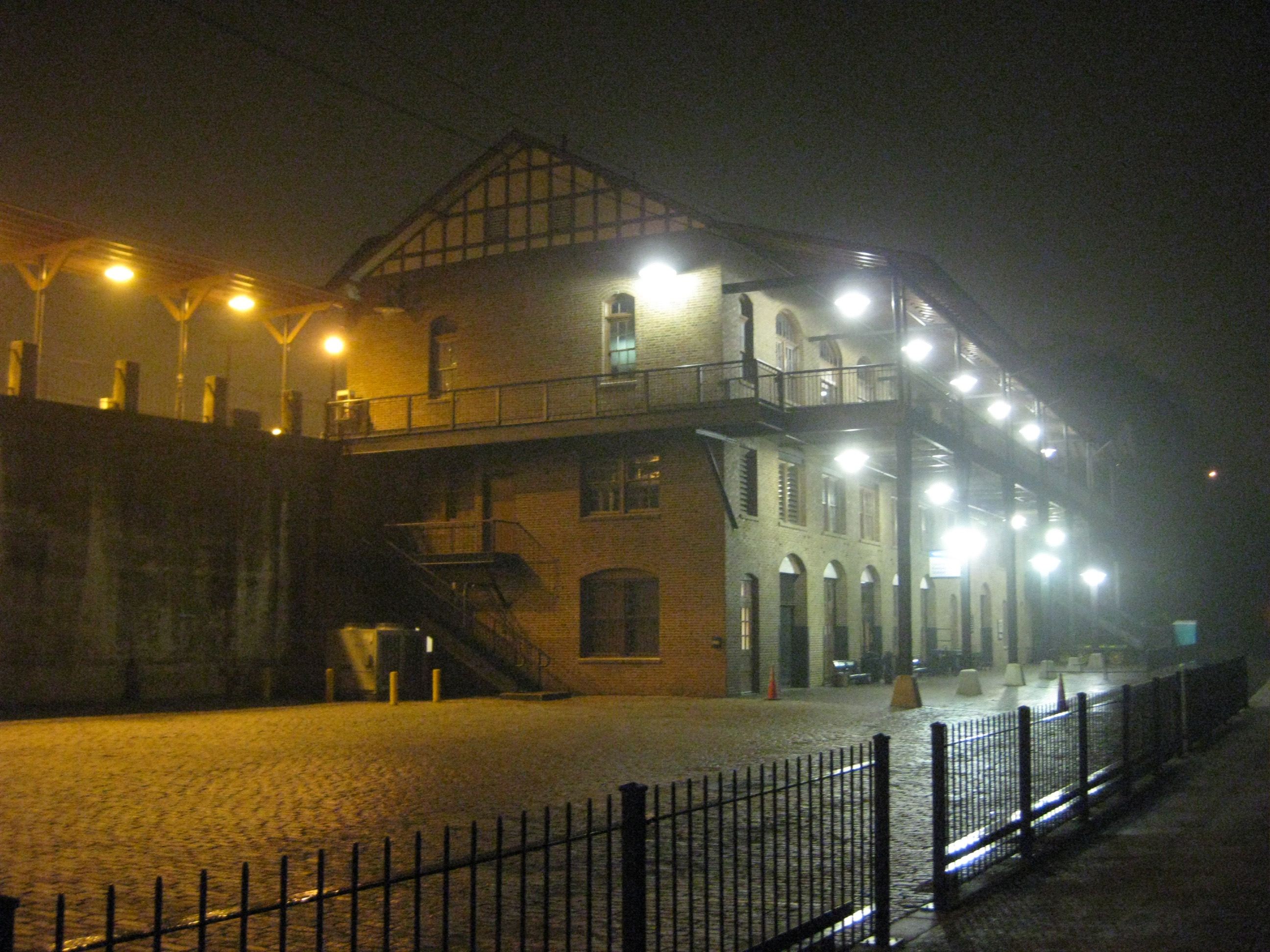
Southern Railway Station, Lynchburg, Virginia

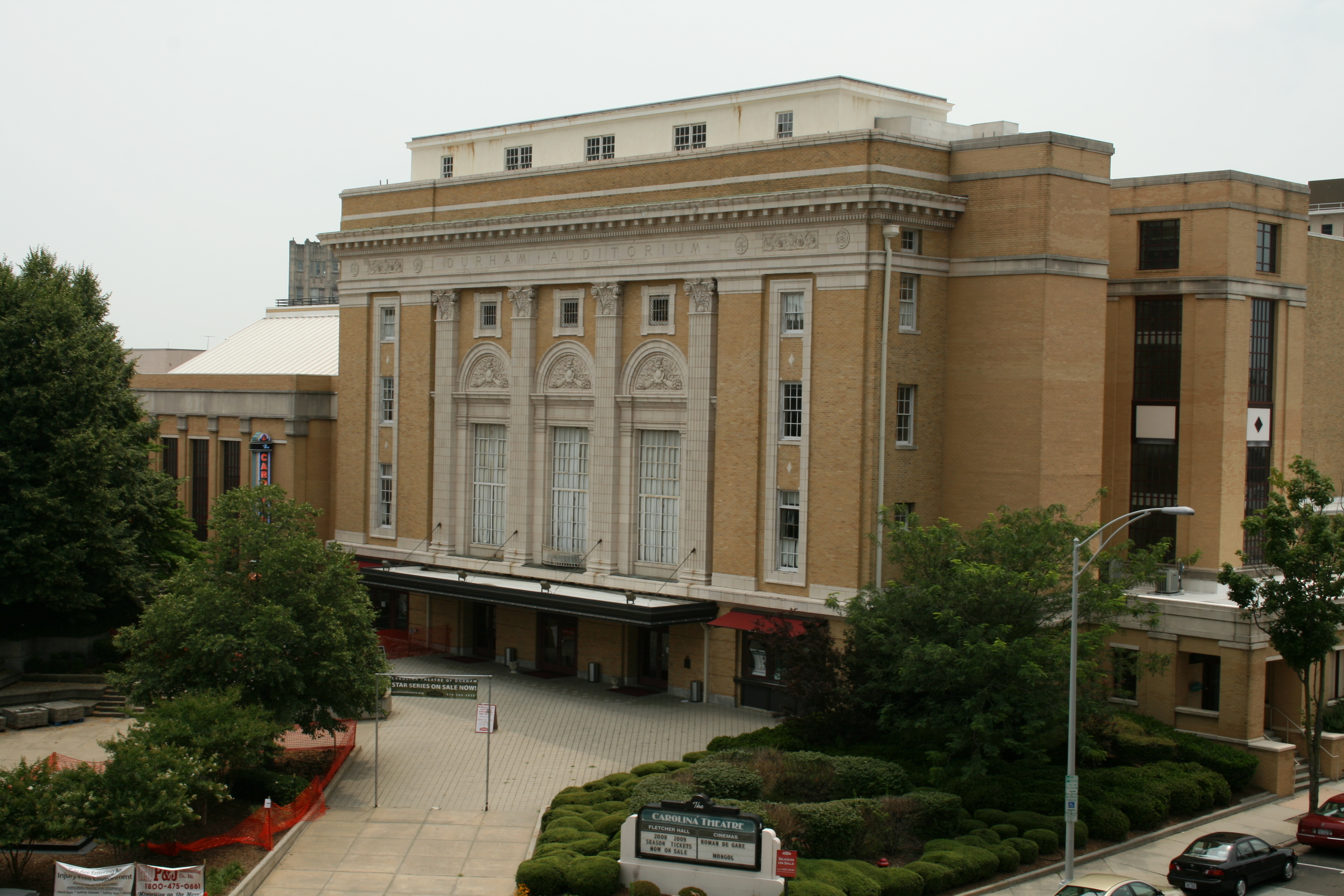
Durham Auditorium (Carolina Theater), Durham, North Carolina

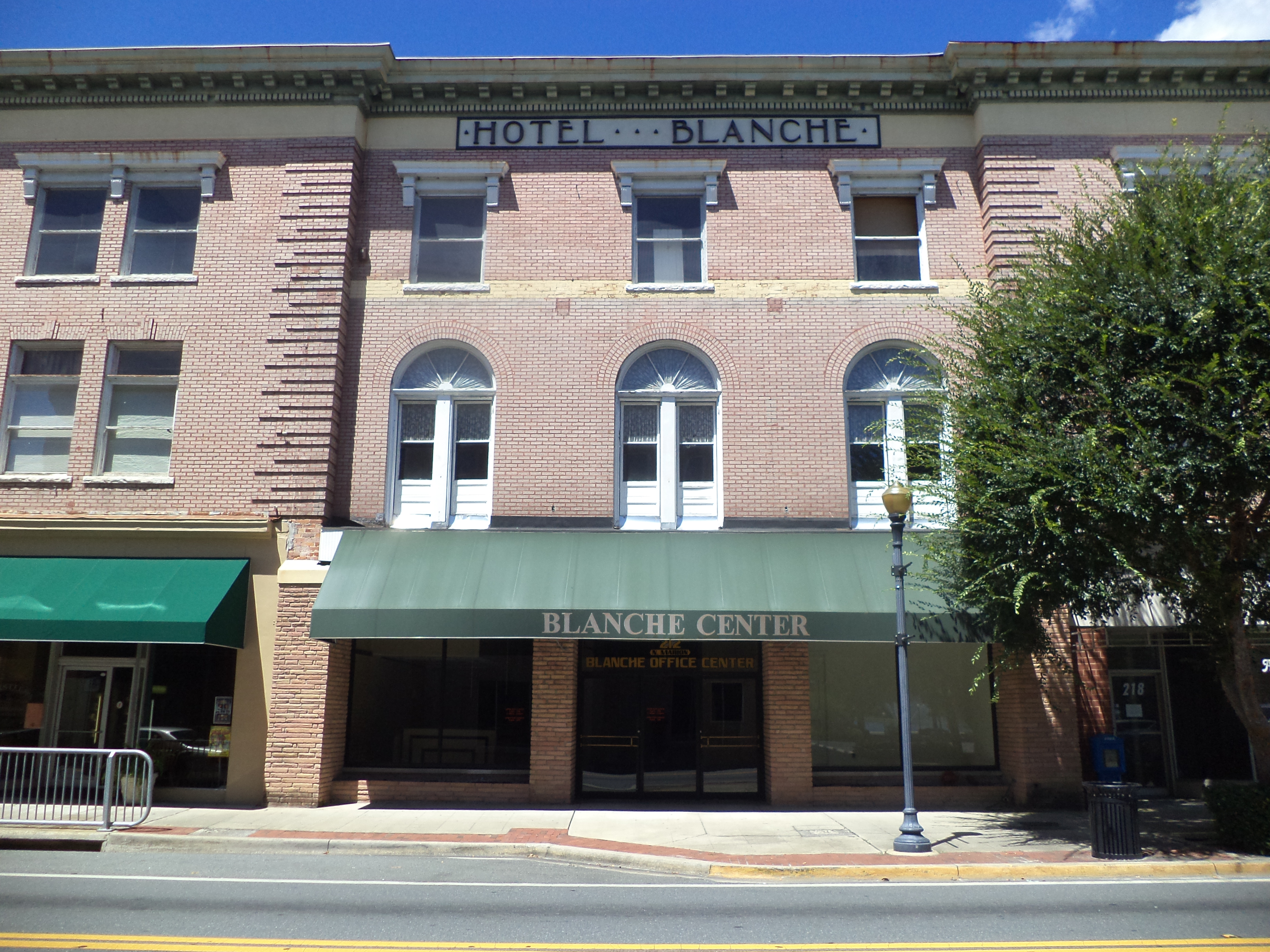
Hotel Blanche, Lake City, Florida

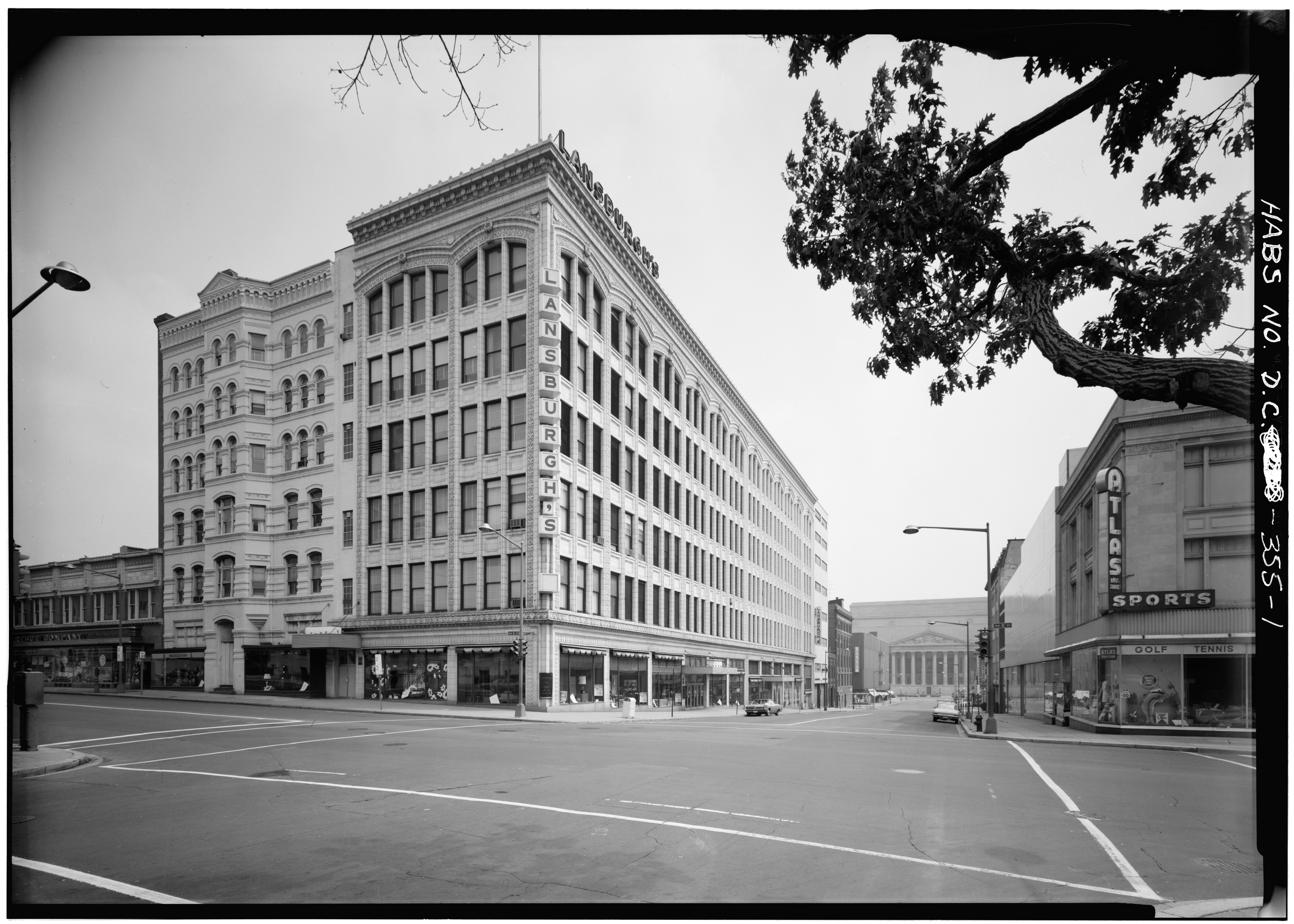
Lansburgh's Department Store, Washington, District of Columbia

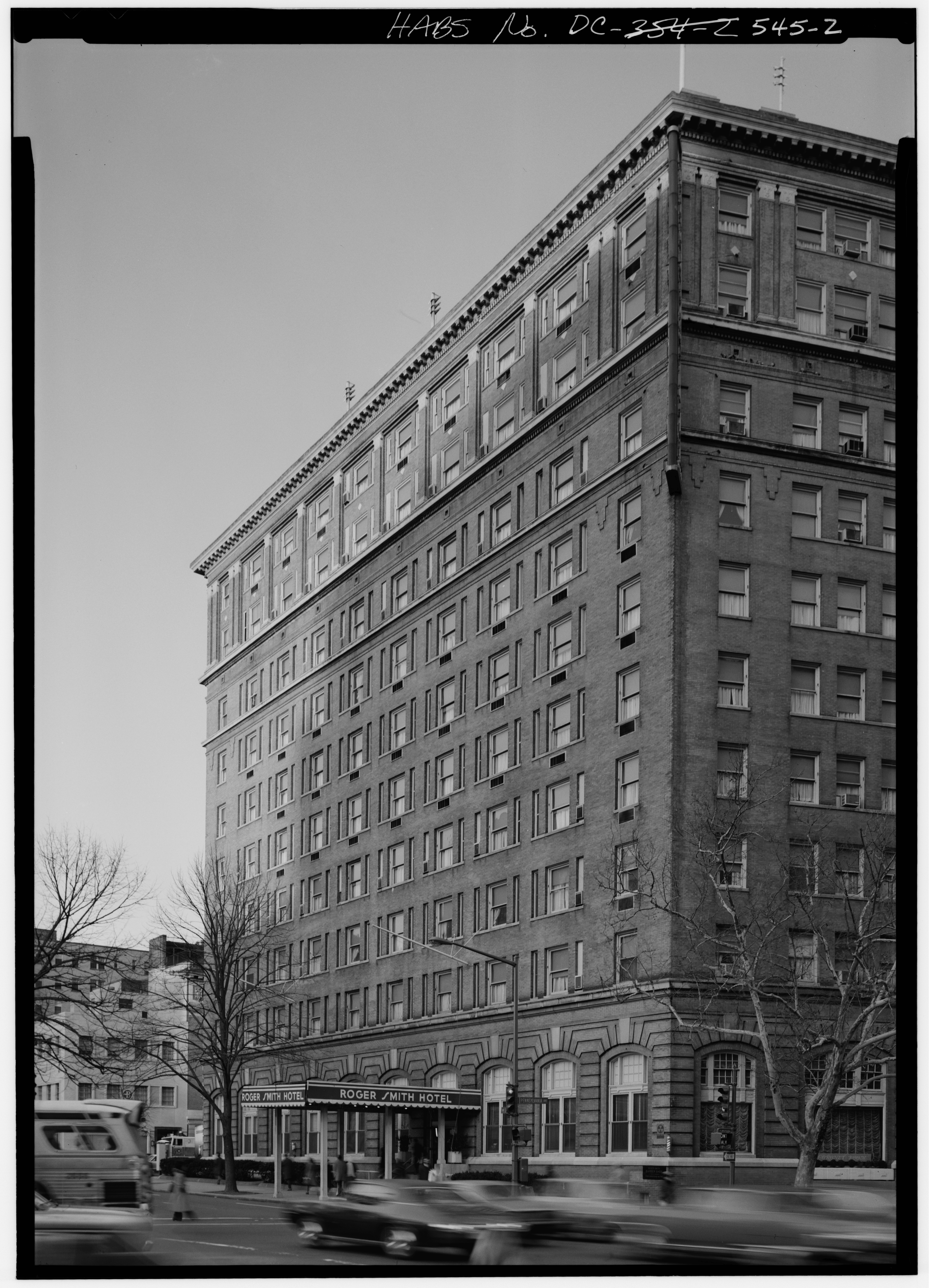
Powhatan Hotel, Washington, District of Columbia

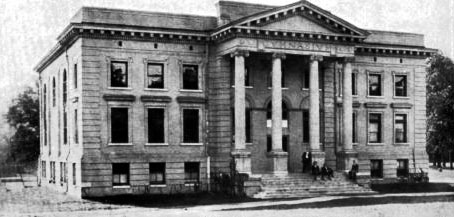
Bynum Gymnasium, University of North Carolina, Chapel Hill, North Carolina

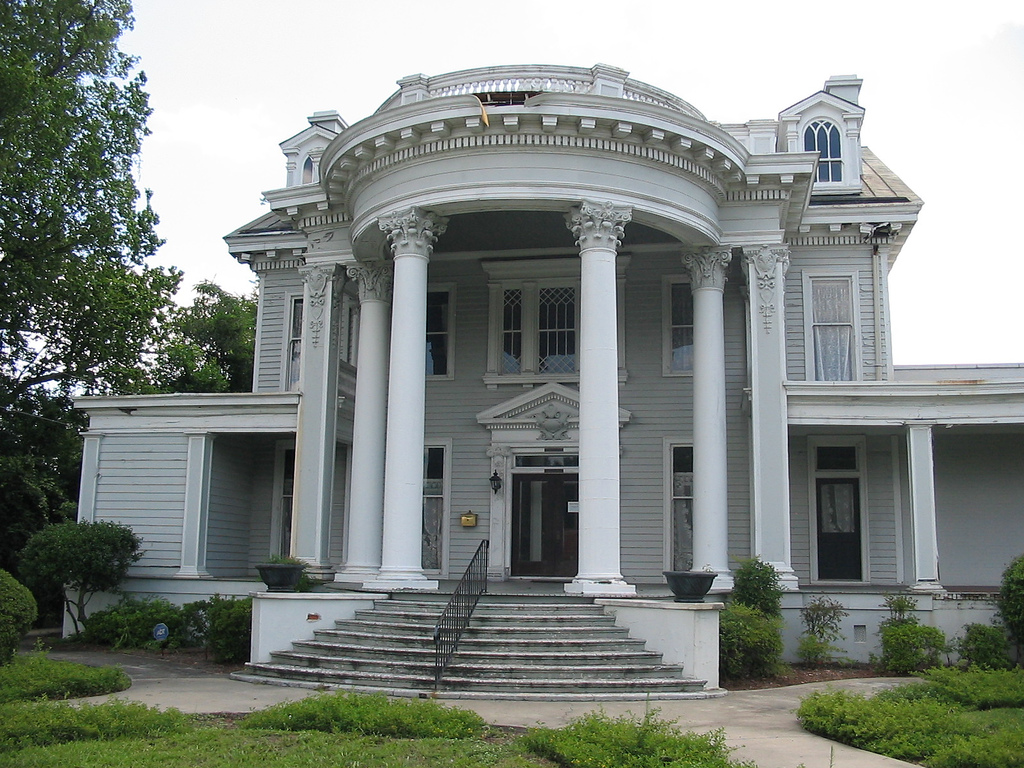
O'Donnel House, Sumter, South Carolina

== See also ==
- List of buildings by Frank Pierce Milburn, includes buildings by Milburn and Heister until Milburn's retirement in 1925
