= W. Hunt Harris =

American lawyer and politician

W. Hunt Harris was an American lawyer and politician in Florida. He served in the Florida House of Representatives and the Florida Senate including as President of the Florida Senate. He lived in Key West. The Florida Archives have a photo of his home at 425 Caroline Street. The home was designed by Frank P. Milburn. Construction was interrupted by the Spanish American War.

Harris studied medicine at Tulane University but when his father died he was unable to continue and moved to Key West where his uncle Jeptha Vining Harris was a customs collector. Harris convinced him to study law and he passed the Bar exam in Tallahassee.

He served as president of the Florida Senate in 1907.

He and another man copyrighted a map of Key West in 1908.
