= Boeing 727 =

Three-engined single-aisle airliner family

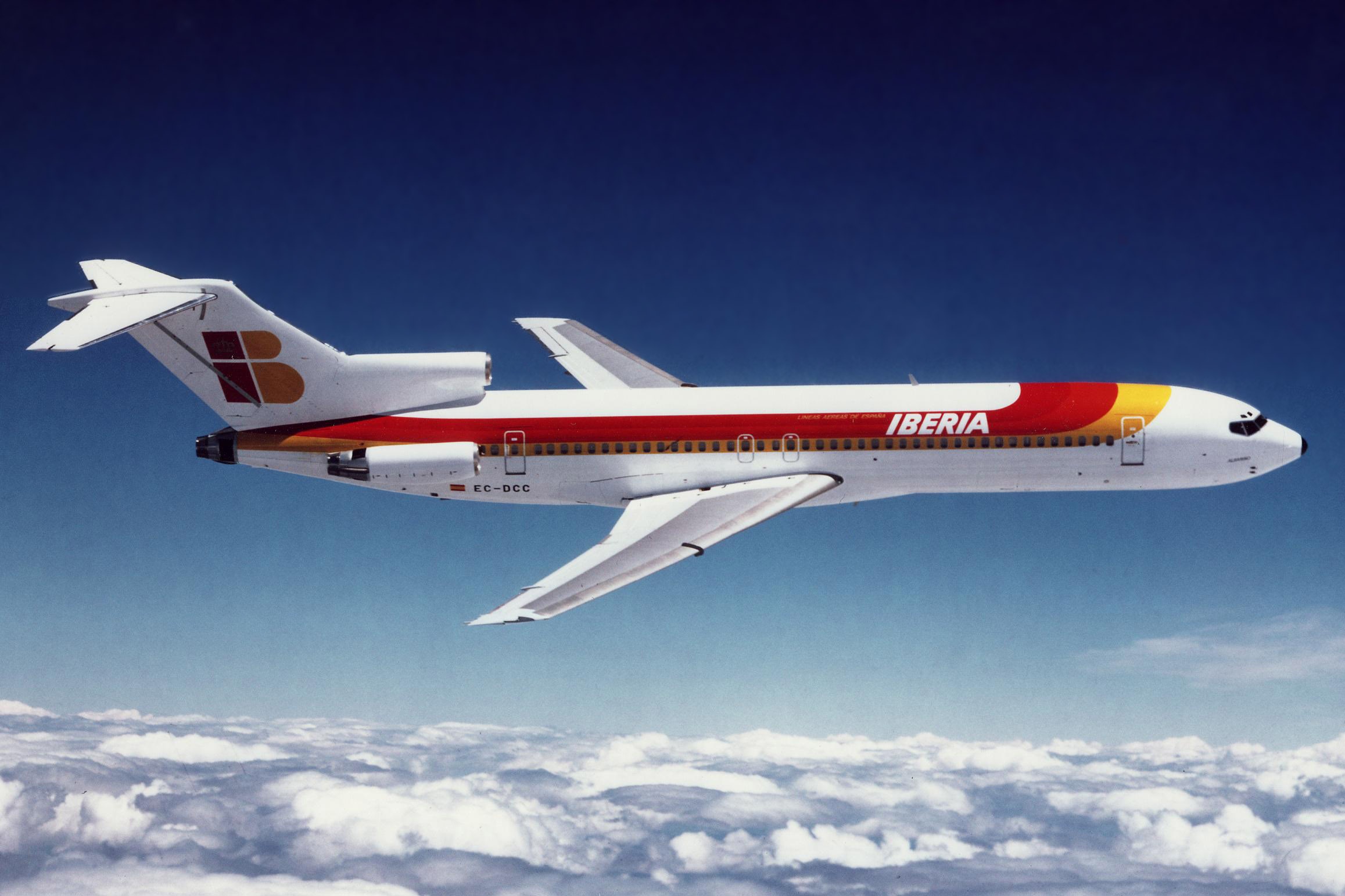
- A stretched 727-200 of Iberia

General information
- Type: Narrow-body jet airliner
- National origin: United States
- Manufacturer: Boeing Commercial Airplanes
- Status: In limited cargo, military and executive service (Note: Retired from airline passenger use in January 2019)
- Primary users: USA Jet Airlines: Air Class Líneas Aéreas; 2Excel Aviation; IFL Group
- Number built: 1,832

History
- Manufactured: 1962–1984
- Introduction date: February 1, 1964, with Eastern Air Lines
- First flight: February 9, 1963; 63 years ago
- Retired: January 22, 2019 (passenger service only)

The Boeing 727 is an American narrow-body trijet that was developed and produced by Boeing Commercial Airplanes. After the heavier 707 quadjet was introduced in 1958, Boeing addressed the demand for shorter flight lengths from smaller airports. On December 5, 1960, the 727 was launched with 40 orders each from United Airlines and Eastern Air Lines. The first 727-100 rolled out on November 27, 1962, first flew on February 9, 1963, and entered service with Eastern on February 1, 1964.

The only trijet aircraft to be produced by Boeing, the 727 is powered by three Pratt & Whitney JT8D low-bypass turbofans below a T-tail, one on each side of the rear fuselage and a center one fed through an S-duct below the tail. It shares its six-abreast upper fuselage cross-section and cockpit with the 707. These features were also later used on the 737. The 133-foot-long (41 m) 727-100 typically carries 106 passengers in two classes over 2,250 nautical miles [nmi] (4,170 km; 2,590 mi), or 129 in a single class. Launched in 1965, the stretched 727-200 flew in July 1967 and entered service with Northeast Airlines that December. The 20 ft (6.1 m) longer variant typically carries 134 passengers in two classes over 2,550 nmi (4,720 km; 2,930 mi), or 155 in a single class. A freighter and a "Quick Change" convertible version were also offered.

The 727 was used for domestic flights and on international flights within its range. Airport noise regulations have led to hush kit installations. Its last commercial passenger flight was in January 2019. It was succeeded by the 757 and larger variants of the 737. There have been 353 incidents involving the Boeing 727. Production ended in September 1984 with 1,832 having been built. The 727 was an industry workhorse for many years, often fondly referred to as "the DC-3 of the Jet Age".

== Development ==
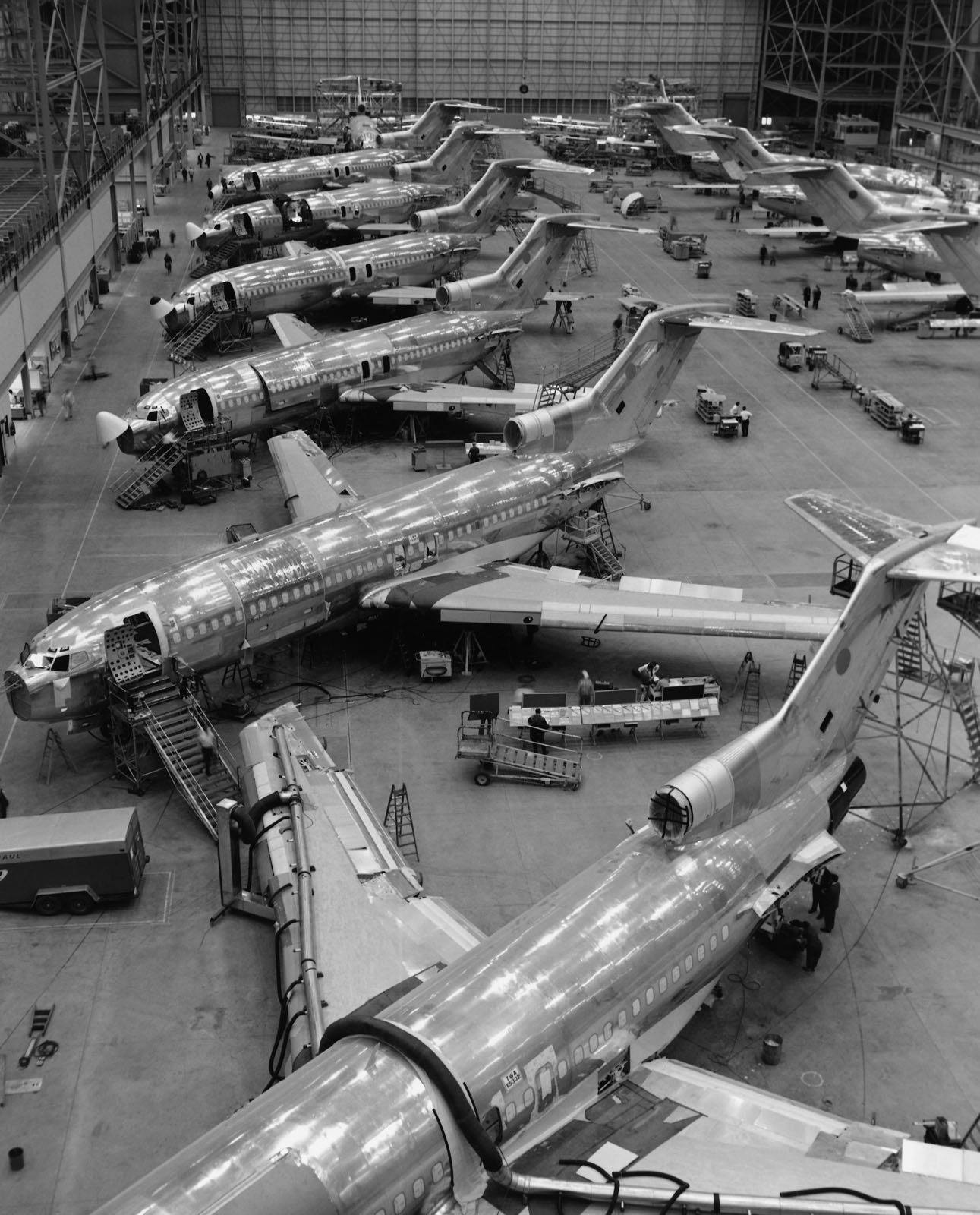
Production of the 727

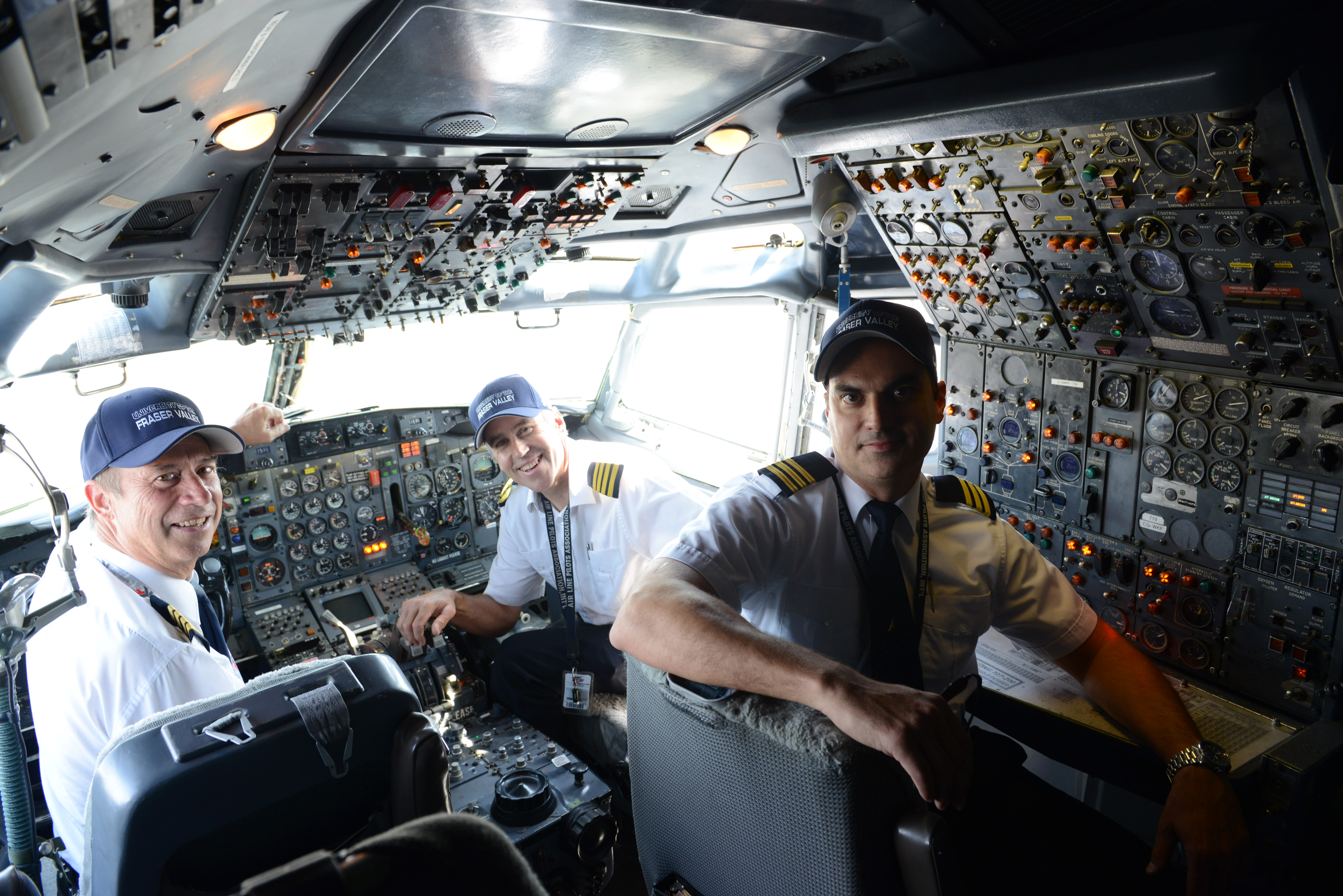
University of the Fraser Valley Aviation department Boeing 727, showing the three-crew cockpit (2015)

The Boeing 727 design was a compromise among United Airlines, American Airlines, and Eastern Air Lines; each of the three had developed requirements for a jet airliner to serve smaller cities with shorter runways and fewer passengers. United Airlines requested a four-engine aircraft for its flights to high-altitude airports, especially its hub at Stapleton International Airport in Denver, Colorado. American Airlines, which was operating the four-engined Boeing 707 and Boeing 720, requested a twin-engined aircraft for efficiency. Eastern Airlines wanted a third engine for its overwater flights to the Caribbean, since at that time twin-engine commercial flights were limited by regulations to routes with 60-minute maximum flying time to an airport (see ETOPS). Eventually, the three airlines agreed on a trijet design for the new aircraft.

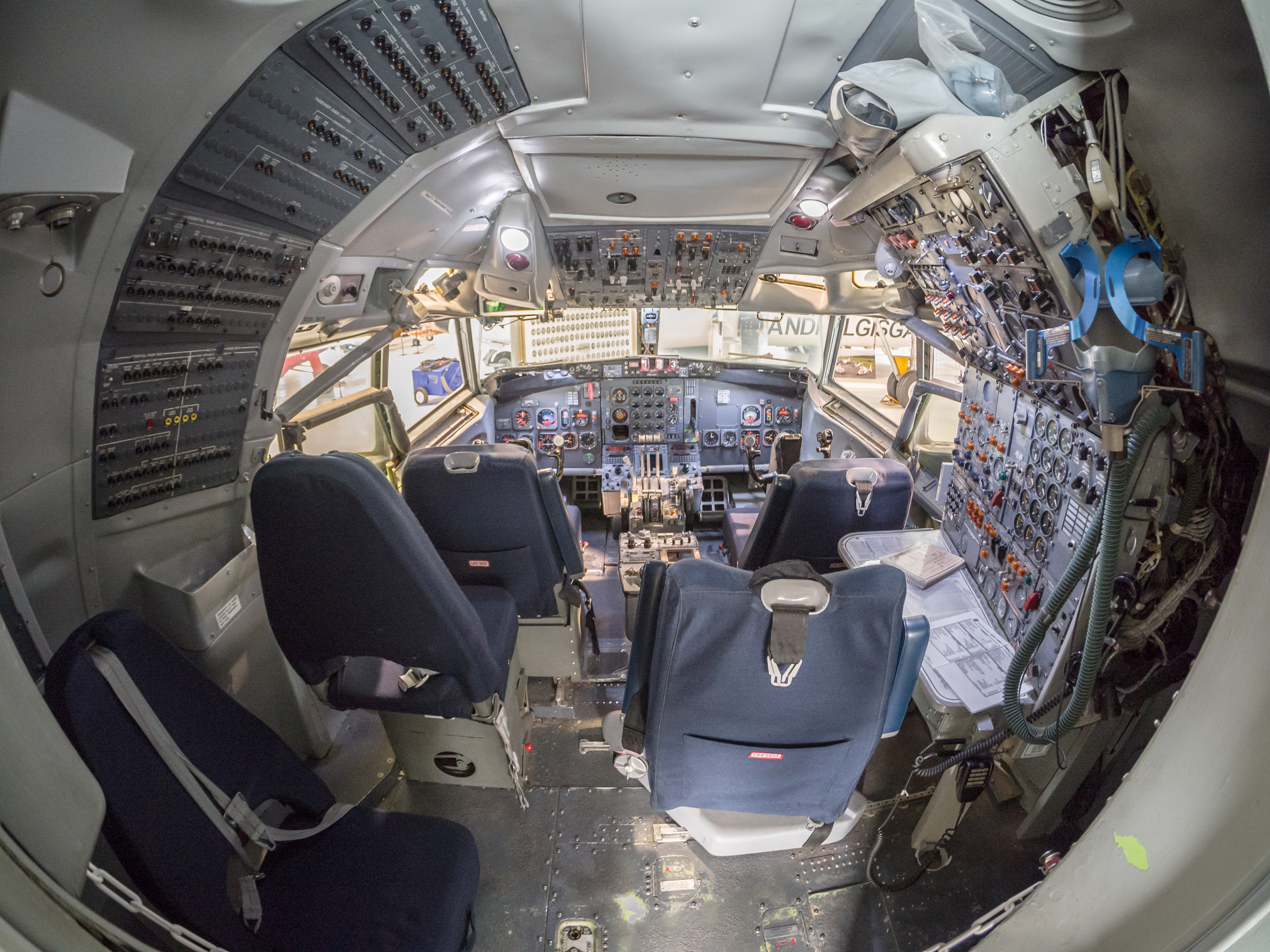
Boeing 727 cockpit

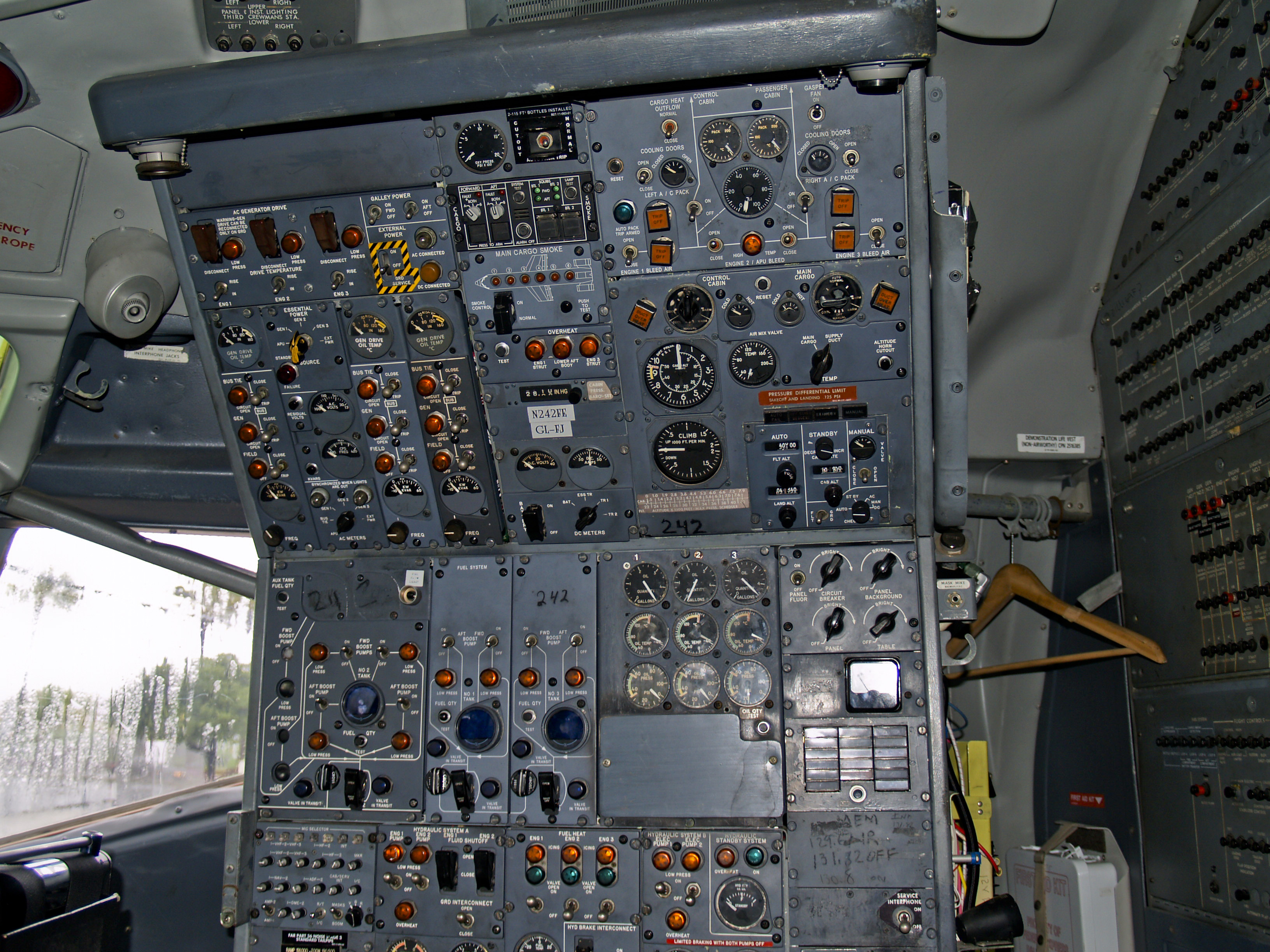
Flight engineer's station on a Boeing 727-200F

In 1959, Lord Douglas, chairman of British European Airways (BEA), suggested that Boeing and de Havilland Aircraft Company (later Hawker Siddeley) work together on their trijet designs, the 727 and D.H.121 Trident, respectively. The two designs had a similar layout, the 727 being slightly larger. At that time Boeing intended to use three Allison AR963 turbofan engines, license-built versions of the Rolls-Royce RB163 Spey used by the Trident. Boeing and de Havilland each sent engineers to the other company's locations to evaluate each other's designs, but Boeing eventually decided against the joint venture. De Havilland had wanted Boeing to license-build the D.H.121, while Boeing felt that the aircraft needed to be designed for the American market, with six-abreast seating and the ability to use runways as short as 4,500 feet (1,400 m).

In 1960, Pratt & Whitney was looking for a customer for its new JT8D turbofan design study, based on its J52 (JT8A) turbojet, while United and Eastern were interested in a Pratt & Whitney alternative to the RB163 Spey. Once Pratt & Whitney agreed to go ahead with development of the JT8D, Eddie Rickenbacker, chairman of the board of Eastern, told Boeing that the airline preferred the JT8D for its 727s. Boeing had not offered the JT8D, as it was about 1,000 lb (450 kg) heavier than the RB163, though slightly more powerful; the RB163 was also further along in development than the JT8D. Boeing reluctantly agreed to offer the JT8D as an option on the 727, and it later became the sole powerplant.

With high-lift devices on its wing, the 727 could use shorter runways than most earlier jets (e.g. the 4,800 ft (1,500 m) runway at Key West International Airport).

A later 727 model, the 727-200, was stretched by 20 feet (6.10 metres) to carry 58 more passengers and replaced earlier jet airliners on short- and medium-haul routes such as the Boeing 707 and Douglas DC-8, as well as aging propeller airliners such as the DC-4, DC-6, DC-7, and the Lockheed Constellations.

For over a decade, more 727s were built per year than any other jet airliner; in 1984, production ended with 1,832 built and 1,831 delivered, the highest total for any jet airliner until the 737 surpassed it in the early 1990s.

== Design ==
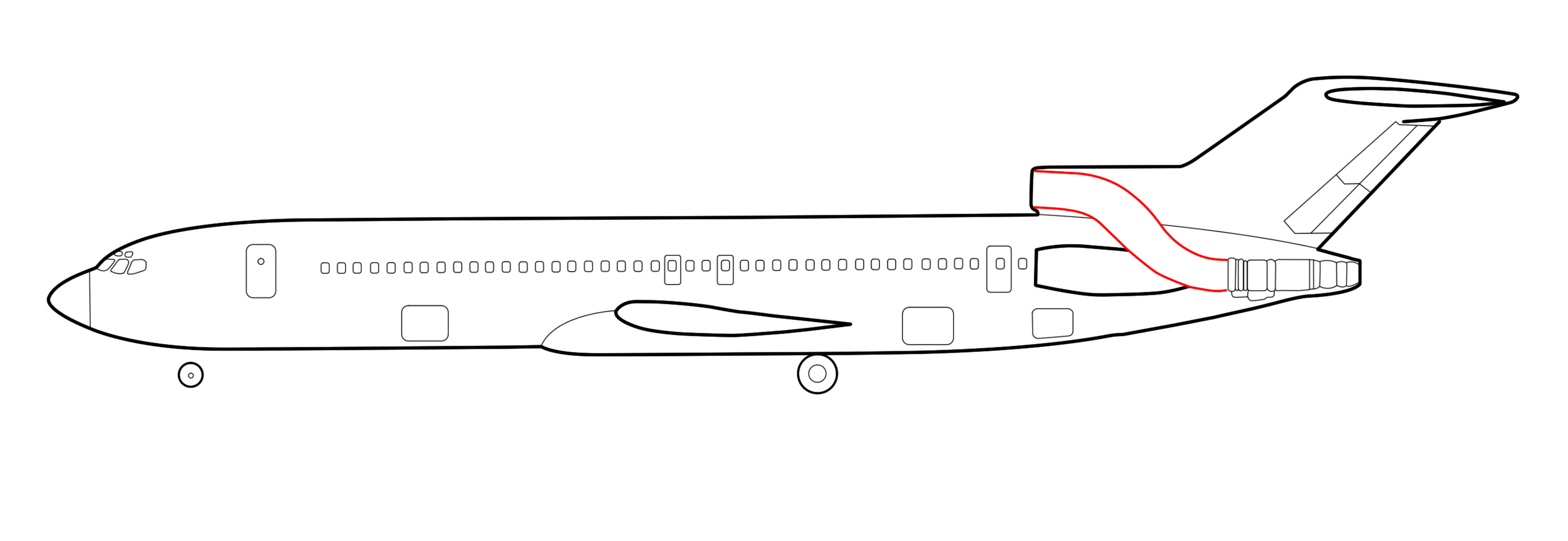
Diagram of the 727 with engine 2 S-duct in red

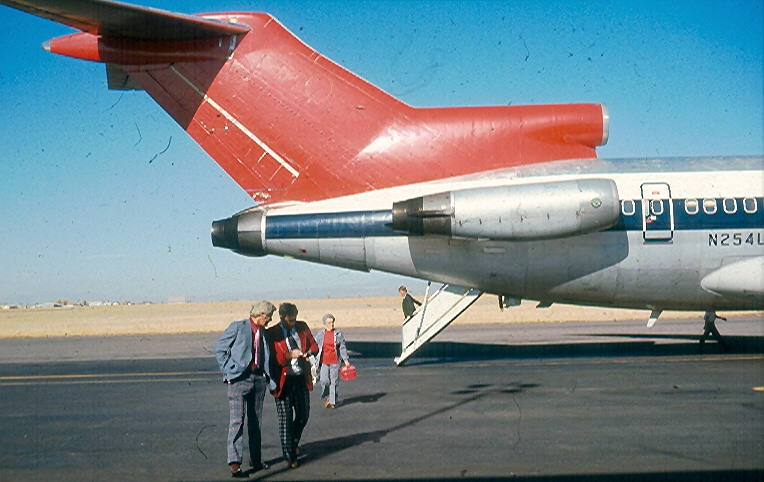
A 727 tail (from Northwest Airlines) with its distinctive rear airstair

The airliner's middle engine (engine 2) at the very rear of the fuselage gets air from an inlet ahead of the vertical fin through an S-shaped duct. This S-duct proved to be troublesome in that flow distortion in the duct induced a surge in the centerline engine on the take-off of the first flight of the 727-100. This was fixed by the addition of several large vortex generators in the inside of the first bend of the duct.

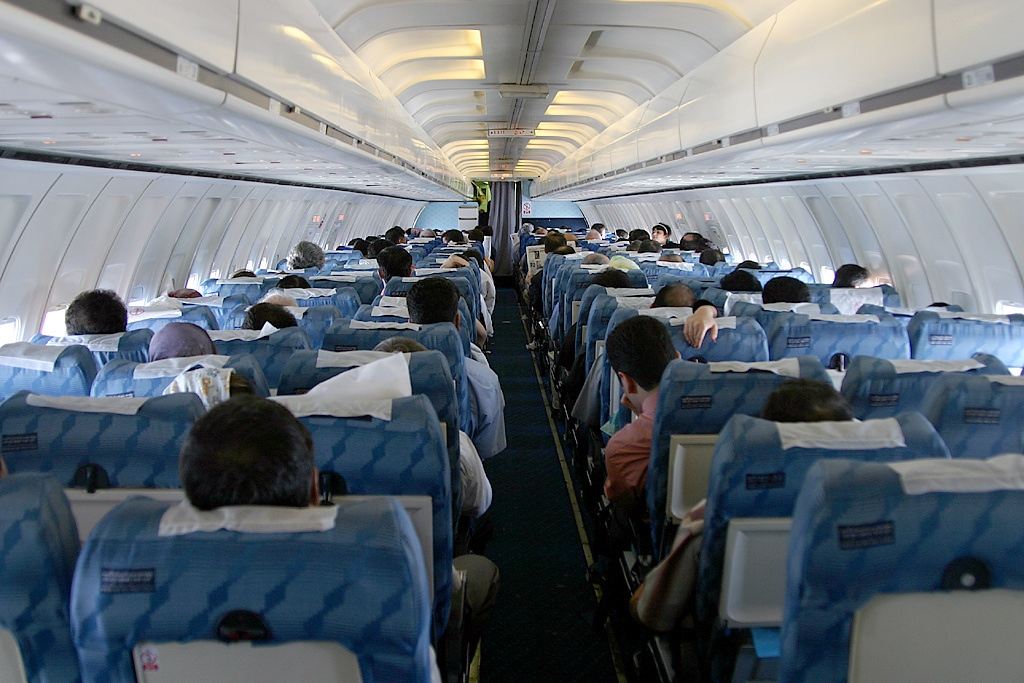
Six-abreast seating in an Iran Aseman Airlines Boeing 727

The 727 was designed for smaller airports, so independence from ground facilities was an important requirement. This led to one of the 727's most distinctive features: the built-in airstair that opens from the rear underbelly of the fuselage, which initially could be opened in flight. Hijacker D. B. Cooper used this hatch when he parachuted from the back of a 727, as it was flying over the Pacific Northwest. Boeing subsequently modified the design with the Cooper vane so that the airstair could not be lowered in flight. The design included an auxiliary power unit (APU), which allowed electrical and air-conditioning systems to run independently of a ground-based power supply, and without having to start one of the main engines. An unusual design feature is that the APU is mounted in a hole in the keel beam web, in the main landing gear bay. The 727 is equipped with a retractable tailskid that is designed to protect the aircraft in the event of an over-rotation on takeoff. The 727's fuselage has an outer diameter of 148 inches (3.8 m). This allows six-abreast seating (three per side) and a single aisle when 18-inch (46 cm) wide coach-class seats are installed. An unusual feature of the fuselage is the 10-inch (25 cm) difference between the lower lobe forward and aft of the wing as the higher fuselage height of the center section was simply retained towards the rear.

Nosewheel brakes were available as an option to reduce braking distance on landing, which provided reduction in braking distances of up to 490 ft (150 m).

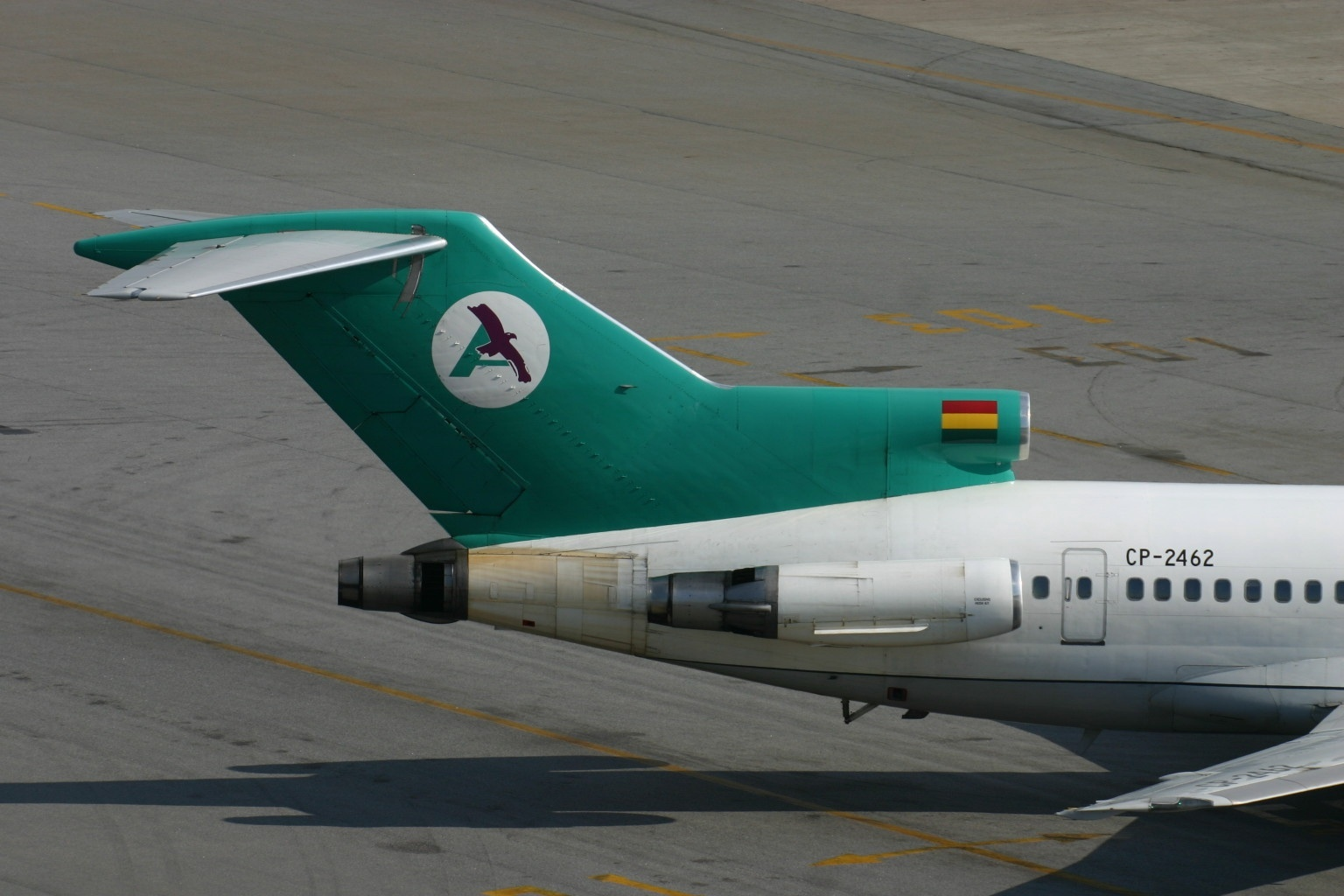
Tail of a Boeing 727 (from AeroSur) with its distinctive T-tail and S-shaped duct feeding the center engine in the tail cone.

The 727 proved to be such a reliable and versatile airliner that it came to form the core of many startup airlines' fleets. The 727 was successful with airlines worldwide partly because it could use smaller runways while still flying medium-range routes. This allowed airlines to carry passengers from cities with large populations but smaller airports to worldwide tourist destinations. One of the features that gave the 727 its ability to land on shorter runways was its clean wing design. With no wing-mounted engines, leading-edge devices (Krueger, or hinged, flaps on the inner wing and extendable leading edge slats out to the wingtip) and trailing-edge lift enhancement equipment (triple-slotted, Fowler flaps) could be used on the entire wing. Together, these high-lift devices produced a maximum wing lift coefficient of 3.0 (based on the flap-retracted wing area). The 727 was stable at very low speeds compared to other early jets, but some domestic carriers learned after review of various accidents that the 40° flap setting could result in a higher-than-desired sink rate or a stall on final approach. These carriers' Pilots' Operation Handbooks disallowed using more than 30° of flaps on the 727, even going so far as installing plates on the flap lever slot to prevent selection of more than 30° of flaps.

=== Noise ===
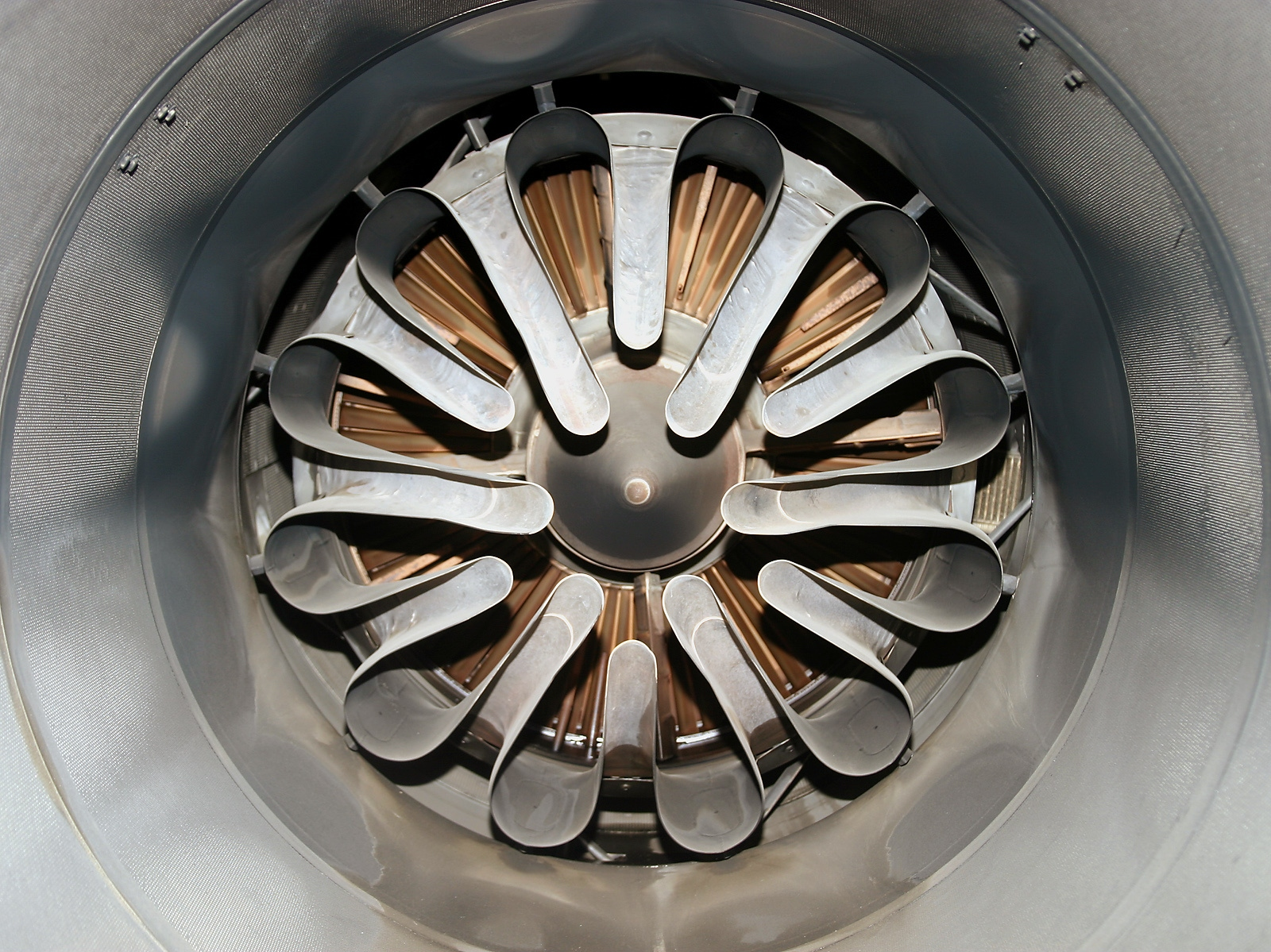
Stage 3 hush kit mixer for the JT8D-1 through -17 engines

Since December 31, 1999, US regulations require that a 727, or any other Stage 2 noise jetliner in commercial service, be retrofitted with a hush kit to reduce engine noise to Stage 3 levels. One such hush kit is offered by FedEx, and has been purchased by over 60 customers. Aftermarket winglet kits, originally developed by Valsan Partners and later marketed by Quiet Wing Corp. have been installed on many 727s to reduce noise at lower speeds, as well as to reduce fuel consumption. In addition, Raisbeck Engineering developed packages to enable 727s to meet the Stage 3 noise requirements. These packages managed to get light- and medium-weight 727s to meet Stage 3 with simple changes to the flap and slat schedules. For heavier-weight 727s, exhaust mixers must be added to meet Stage 3. American Airlines ordered and took delivery of 52 Raisbeck 727 Stage 3 systems. Other customers included TWA, Pan Am, Air Algérie, TAME, and many smaller airlines.

Since September 1, 2010, 727 jetliners (including those with a hush kit) are banned from some Australian airports because they are too loud.

== Operational history ==
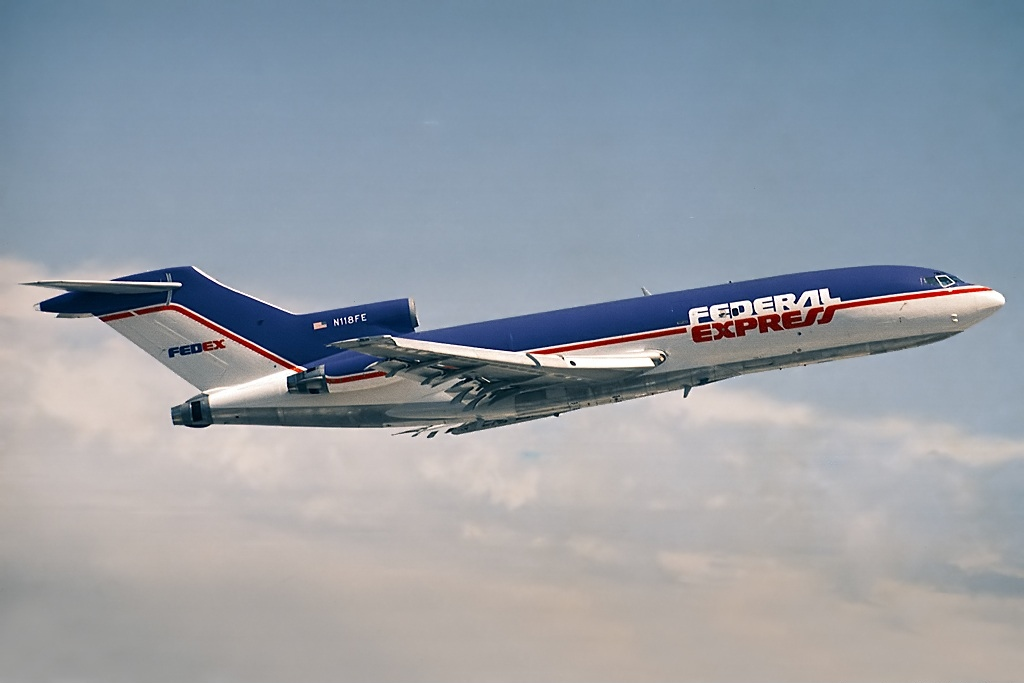
A FedEx Express 727-25C in 1993

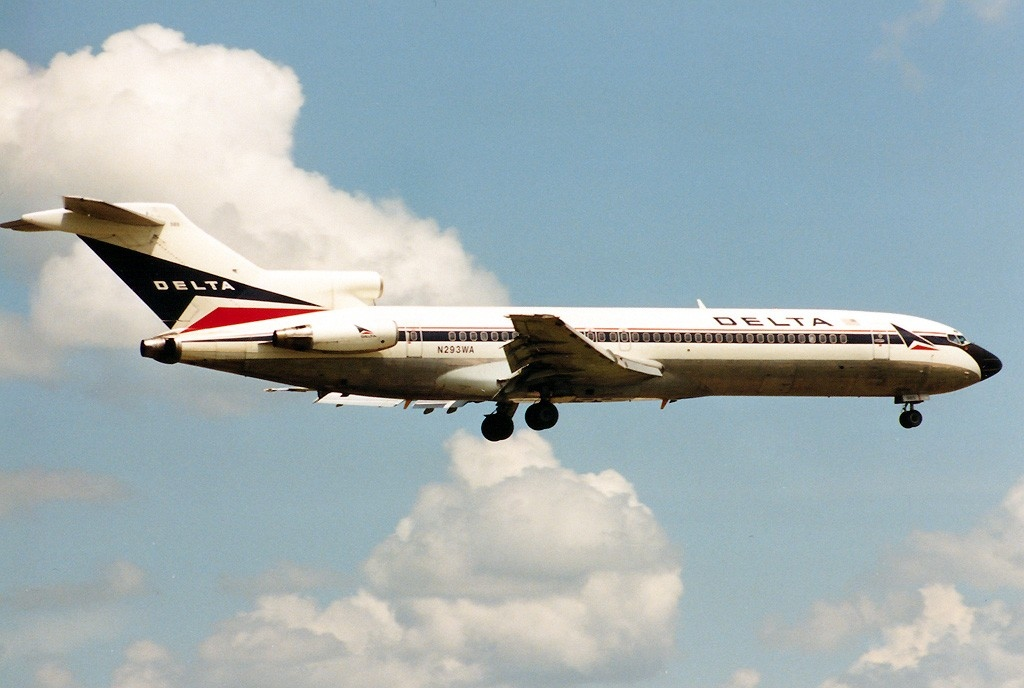
Delta Air Lines retired its last 727 from scheduled service in April 2003

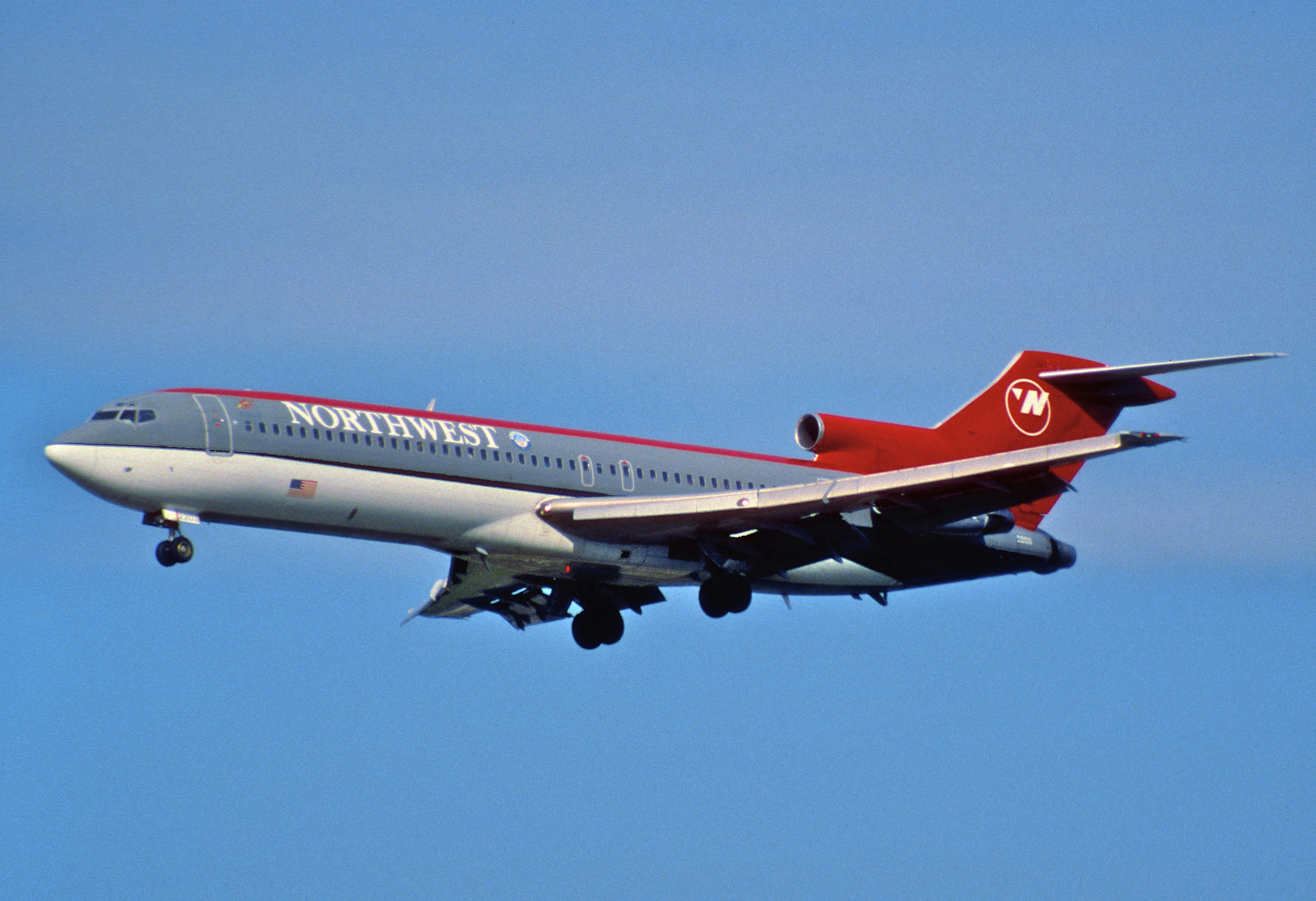
Northwest Airlines retired its last 727 from charter service in June 2003

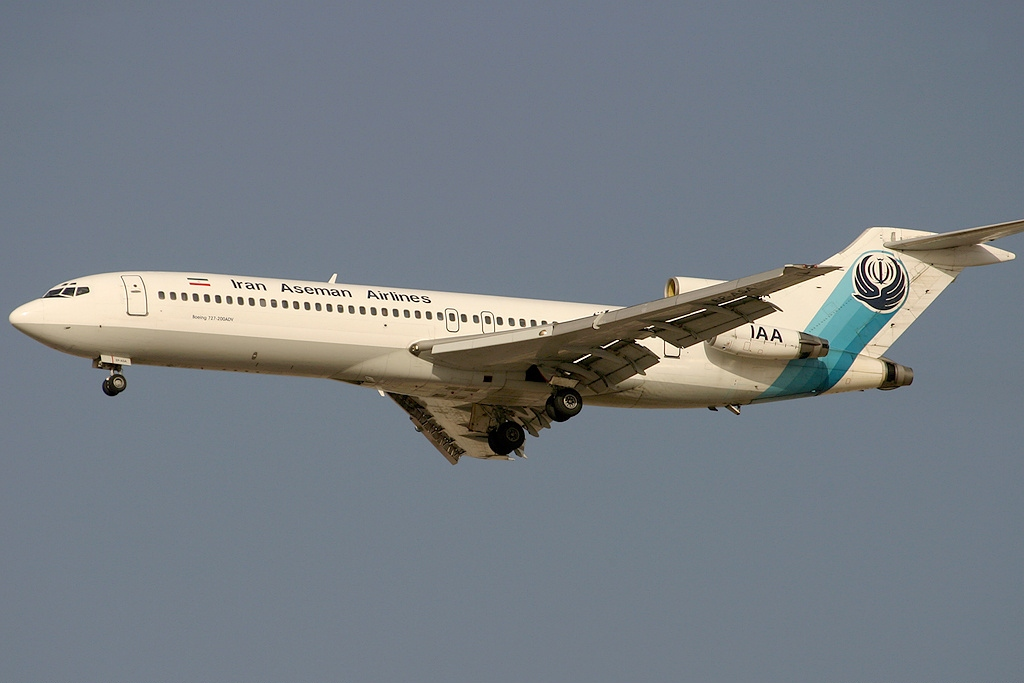
Iran Aseman Airlines operated the last scheduled 727 passenger flight in 2019.

In addition to domestic flights of medium range, the 727 was popular with international passenger airlines. The range of flights it could cover (and the additional safety added by the third engine) meant that the 727 proved efficient for short- to medium-range international flights in areas around the world.

The 727 also proved popular with cargo and charter airlines. FedEx Express introduced 727s in 1978. In 1988 in order to make the aircraft quieter, FedEx in collaboration with Pratt & Whitney replaced the side engines with more efficient, quieter Pratt & Whitney JT8D-200 low-bypass turbofan jet engines.

The 727s were the backbone of FedEx's fleet until 2007 when it began replacing them with Boeing 757s.

The 727 had some military uses as well. Since the aft stair could be opened in flight, the Central Intelligence Agency used them to drop agents and supplies behind enemy lines in Vietnam. In early 1988, The Iraqi Air Force modified a Boeing 727 by fitting it with Thomson-CSF TMV-018 Syrel pods for ESM and Raphael-TH pods with side looking radar. Known as 'Faw-727', it was reportedly used as an ELINT platform in the invasion of Kuwait in 1990 (during which it was briefly locked on by a Kuwaiti Mirage F1 on August 2) and the subsequent Iraqi monitoring of Coalition forces during Desert Shield.

A military version, the Boeing C-22, was operated as a medium-range transport aircraft by the Air National Guard and National Guard Bureau to airlift personnel. A total of three C-22Bs were in use, all assigned to the 201st Airlift Squadron, District of Columbia Air National Guard.

At the start of the 21st century, the 727 remained in service with a few large airlines. Faced with higher fuel costs, lower passenger volumes due to the post-9/11 economic climate, increasing restrictions on airport noise, and the extra expenses of maintaining older planes and paying flight engineers' salaries, most major airlines phased out their 727s and replaced them with quieter more fuel-efficient, two-pilot crewed twin-engined aircraft. Northwest Airlines retired its last 727 from charter service in June 2003. Delta Air Lines, the last major U.S. carrier to do so, retired its final 727 from scheduled service in April 2003. Many airlines replaced their 727s with either the 737-800 or the Airbus A320; both are close in size to the 727-200. As of July 2013, a total of 109 Boeing 727s were in commercial service with 34 airlines; three years later, the total had fallen to 64 airframes in service with 26 airlines.

On March 2, 2016, the first 727 produced (N7001U), which first flew on February 9, 1963, made a flight to a museum after extensive restoration. The 727-100 had carried about three million passengers during its years of service. Originally a prototype, it was later sold to United Airlines, which donated it to the Museum of Flight in Seattle in 1991. The jet was restored over 25 years by the museum and was ferried from Paine Field in Everett, Washington, to Boeing Field in Seattle, where it was put on permanent display at the Aviation Pavilion. The Federal Aviation Administration granted the museum a special permit for the 15-minute flight. The museum's previous 727-223, tail number N874AA, was donated to the National Airline History Museum in Kansas City and was planned to be flown to its new home once FAA ferry approval was granted. After a series of financial problems with the restoration, N874AA was seized by Boeing Field for nonpayment of storage fees in 2021 and subsequently broken up and scrapped.

Iran Aseman Airlines, the last passenger airline operator, made the worldwide last scheduled 727 passenger flight on January 13, 2019 between Zahedan and Tehran.

== Variants ==
Data from: Boeing Aircraft since 1916.

The two series of 727 are the initial -100 (originally only two figures as in -30), which was launched in 1960 and entered service in February 1964, and the -200 series, which was launched in 1965 and entered service in December 1967.

=== 727-100 ===
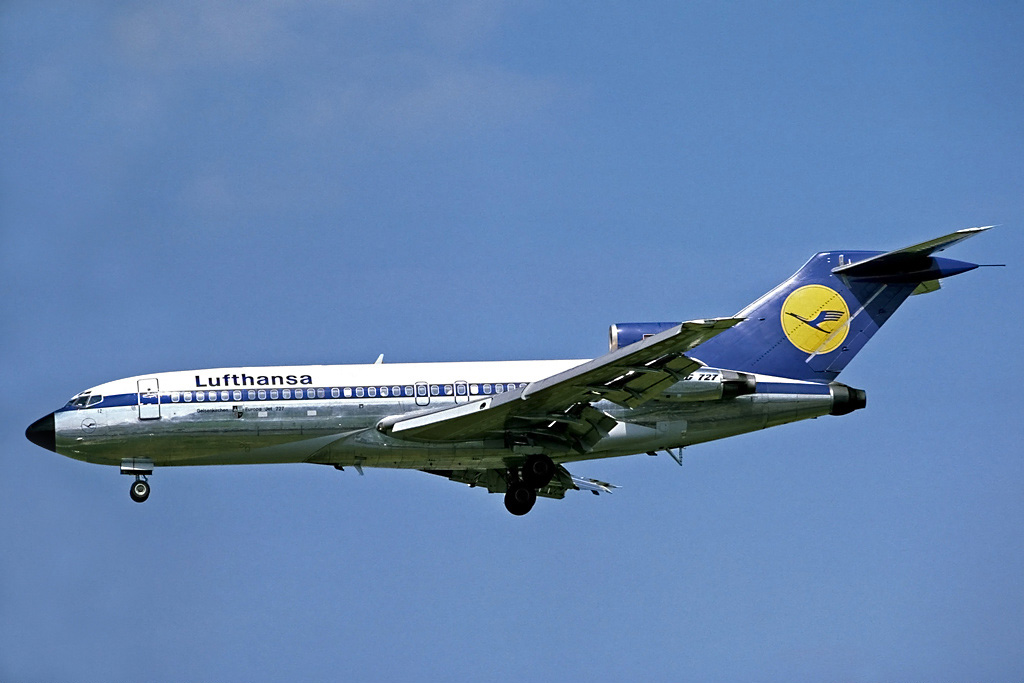
The initial 727-100 (from Lufthansa here) is 133 ft (41 m) long.

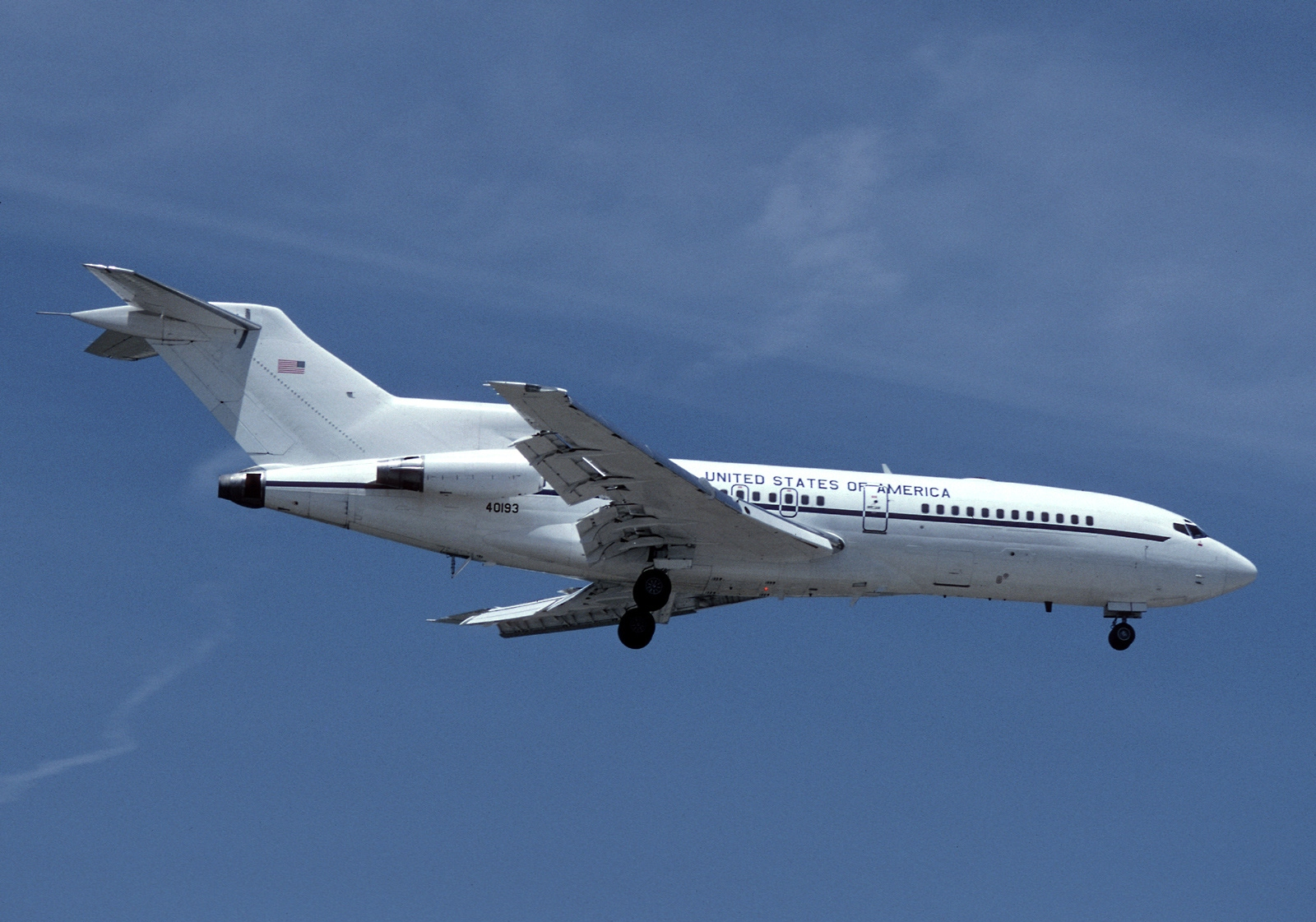
The sole C-22A.

The first 727-100 (N7001U) flew on February 9, 1963. FAA type approval was awarded on December 24 of that year, with initial delivery to United Airlines on October 29, 1963, to allow pilot training to commence. The first 727 passenger service was flown by Eastern Air Lines on February 1, 1964, between Miami, Washington, DC, and Philadelphia.

A total of 571 Boeing 727-00/100 series aircraft were delivered (407 -100s, 53 -100Cs, and 111 -100QCs), the last in October 1972. One 727-100 was retained by Boeing, bringing total production to 572.

The -100 designation was assigned retroactively to distinguish the original short-body version. Prior to the introduction of the 727-200, all short-body aircraft followed a "727-00" pattern. Aircraft were delivered for United Airlines as 727-22, for American Airlines as 727-23 and these designations were retained even after the advent of the 727-200. However, short-body aircraft ordered after the introduction of the 727-200 followed the new "727-100" pattern (i.e. 727-123 for American Airlines).

==== 727-100C ====
Convertible passenger cargo version, additional freight door and strengthened floor and floor beams, three alternative fits:

- 94 mixed-class passengers
- 52 mixed-class passengers and four cargo pallets (22,700 lb or 10,300 kg)
- Eight cargo pallets (38,000 lb or 17,000 kg)

==== 727-100QC ====
QC stands for Quick Change. This is similar to the convertible version with a roller-bearing floor for palletized galley and seating and cargo to allow a much faster changeover time of 30 minutes.

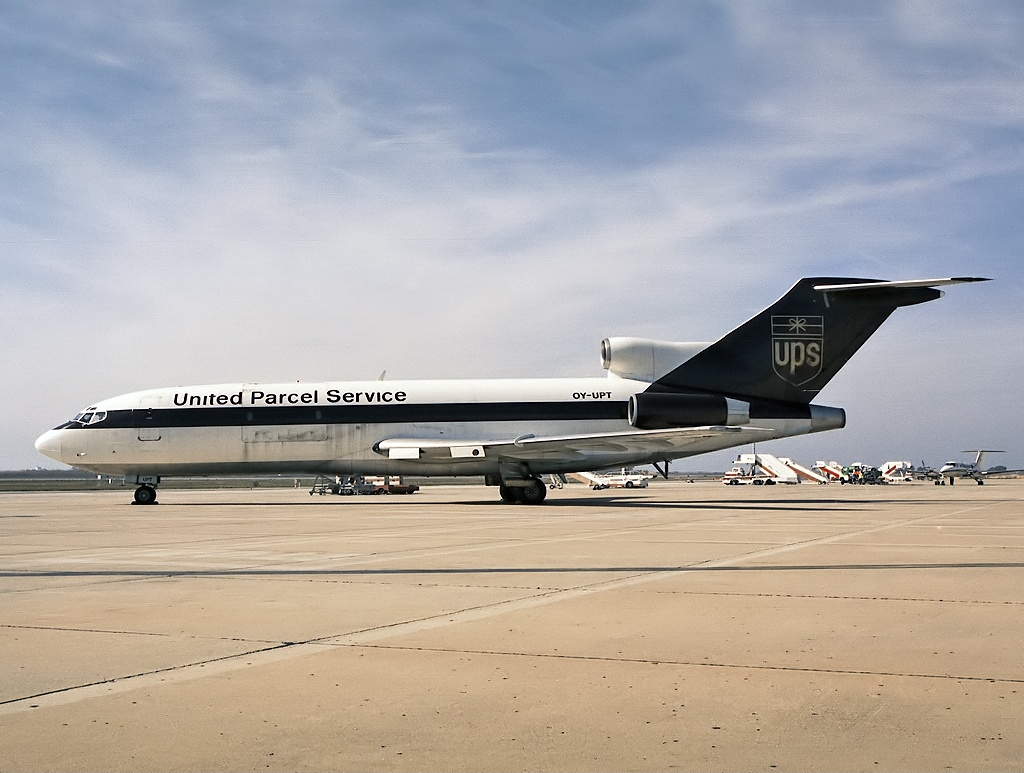
A 727-100QF of UPS Airlines. The air intake for the #2 engine has a distinctive "hump" on converted aircraft.

==== 727-100QF ====
QF stands for Quiet Freighter. A cargo conversion for United Parcel Service, these were re-engined with Stage 3-compliant Rolls-Royce Tay turbofans.

==== Boeing C-22A ====
A single 727-30 acquired from the Federal Aviation Administration, this aircraft was originally delivered to Lufthansa. It served mostly with United States Southern Command flying from Panama City / Howard Air Force Base.

==== Boeing C-22B ====
Four 727-35 aircraft were acquired from National Airlines by the United States Air Force for transporting Air National Guard and National Guard personnel.

=== 727-200 ===
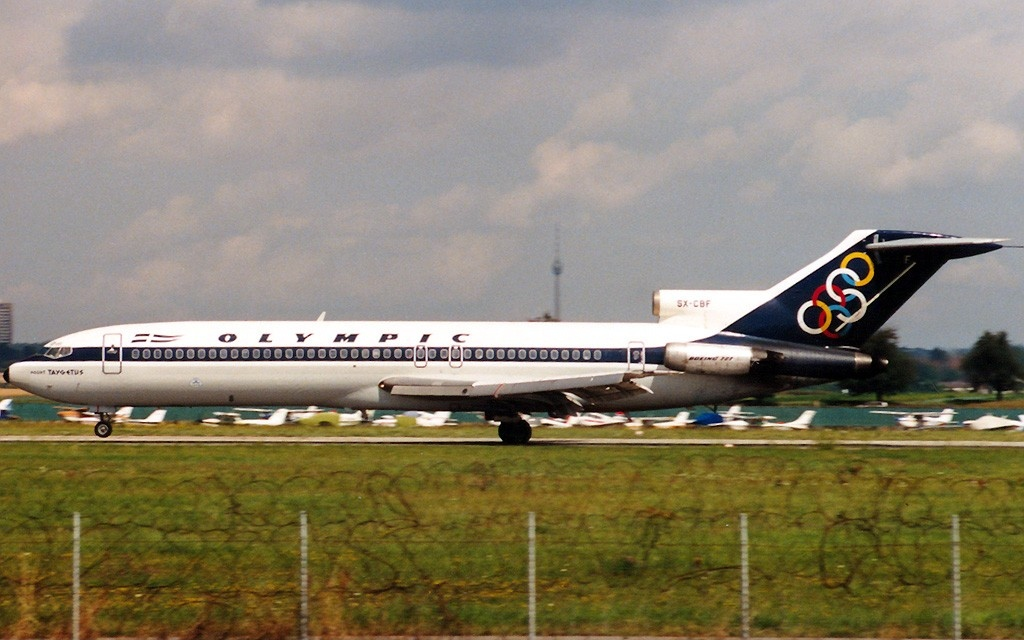
The 727-200 (here from Olympic Airways) is 20 ft (6.1 m) longer. This aircraft is the prototype of 727-200

A stretched version of the 727-100, the -200 is 20 feet (6.1 m) longer (153 feet 2 inches or 46.69 metres) than the -100 (133 feet 2 inches or 40.59 metres). A 10 ft (3.0 m) fuselage section ("plug") was added in front of the wings and another 10 ft fuselage section was added behind them. The wing span and height remain the same on both the -100 and -200 (108 and 34 feet (33 and 10 m), respectively). The original 727-200 had the same maximum gross weight as the 727-100; however, as the aircraft evolved, a series of higher gross weights and more powerful engines were introduced along with other improvements, and from line number 881, 727-200s are dubbed -200 Advanced. The aircraft gross weight eventually increased from 169,000 to 209,500 pounds (76,700 to 95,000 kg) for the latest versions. The dorsal intake of the number-two engine was also redesigned to be round in shape, rather than oval as it was on the -100 series.

The first 727-200 flew on July 27, 1967, and received FAA certification on November 30, 1967. The first delivery was made on December 14, 1967, to Northeast Airlines. A total of 310 727-200s were delivered before the -200 was replaced on the production line by the 727-200 Advanced in 1972.

==== 727-200C ====
A convertible passenger cargo version; only one was built.

727-200 Advanced

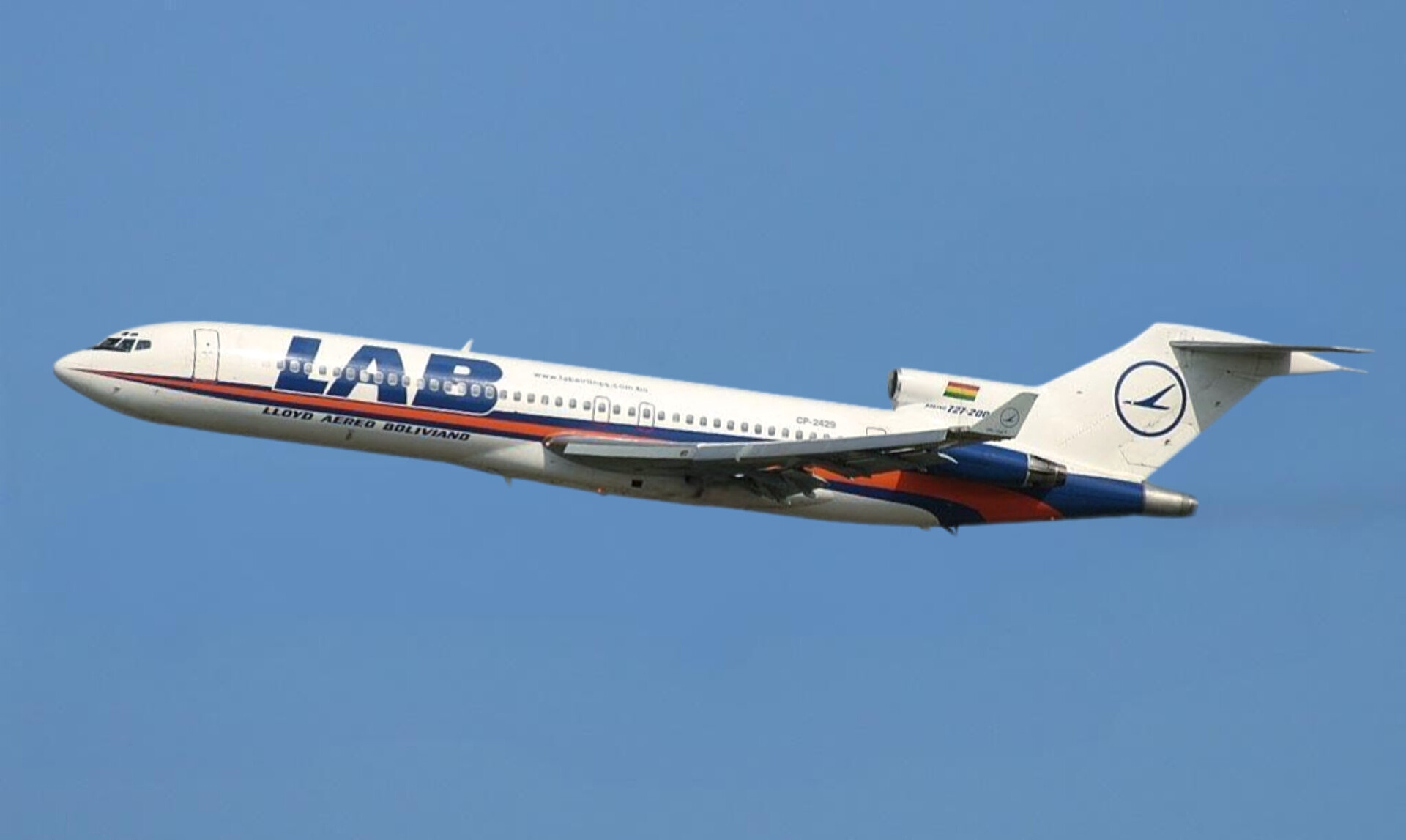
A 727-200 Advanced (from Lloyd Aéreo Boliviano), equipped with winglets

The Advanced version of the 727-200 was introduced in 1970. It featured powerful engines, fuel capacity and MTOW (185,800–210,000 lb or 84.3–95.3 t) increased the range from 1,930 to 2,550 nmi (3,570 to 4,720 km; 2,220 to 2,930 mi) or by 32%. After the first delivery in mid-1972, Boeing eventually raised production to more than a hundred per year to meet demand by the late 1970s. Of the passenger model of the 727-200 Advanced, a total of 935 were delivered, after which it had to give way to a new generation of aircraft.

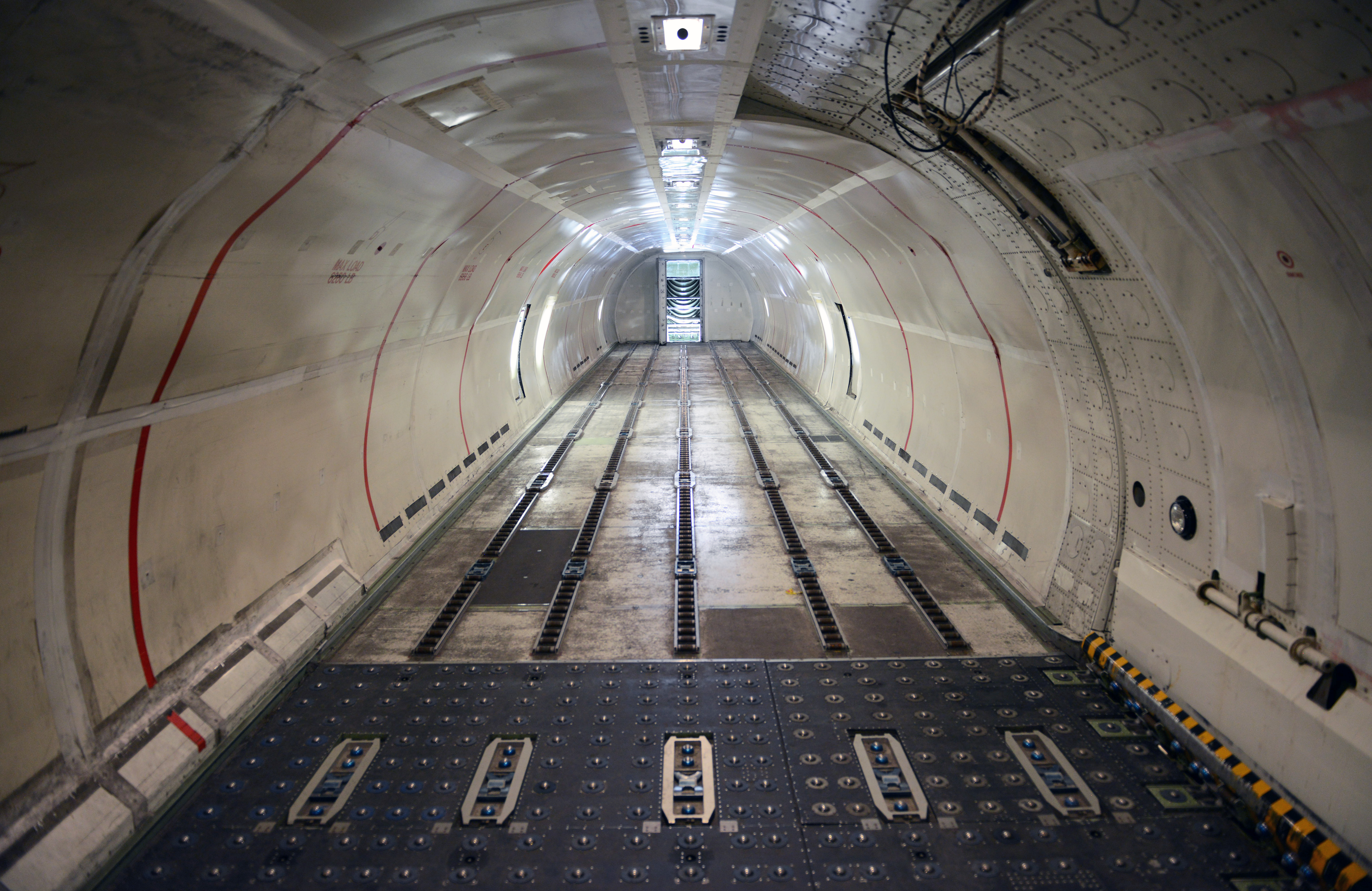
Freighter cargo hold

==== 727-200F Advanced ====
A freighter version of the 727-200 Advanced became available in 1981, designated the Series 200F Advanced. Powered by Pratt & Whitney JT8D-17A engines, it featured a strengthened fuselage structure, an 11 ft 2 in (3.40 m) by 7 ft 2 in (2.18 m) forward main deck freight door, and a windowless cabin. Fifteen of these aircraft were built, all for Federal Express. This was the last production variant of the 727 to be developed by Boeing; the last 727 aircraft completed by Boeing was a 727-200F Advanced.

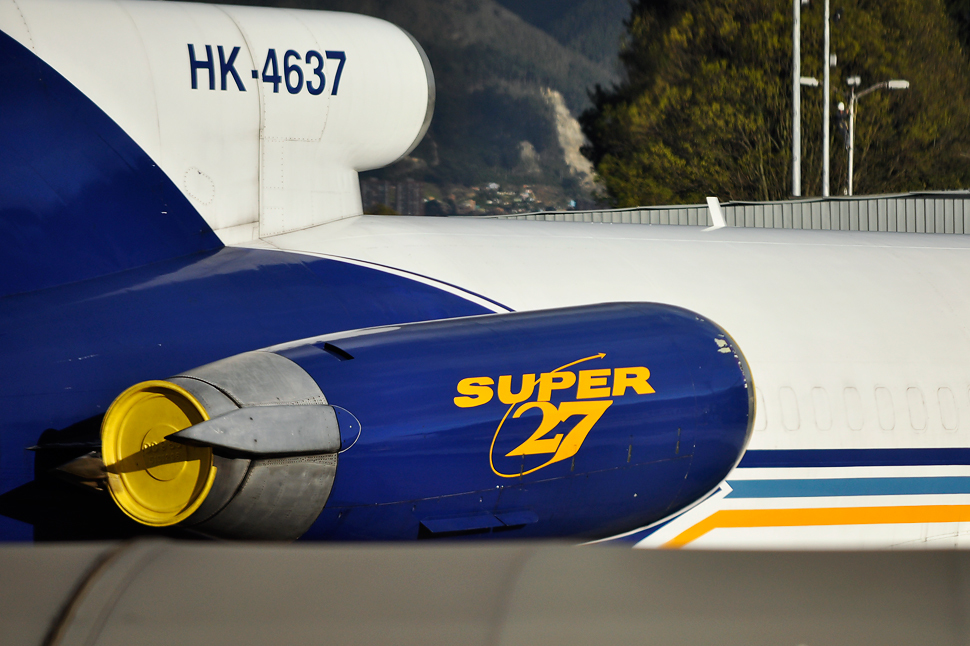
The "Super 27" re-engine has larger JT8D-200 side engines

==== Super 27 ====
Certificated by Valsan Partners in December 1988 and marketed by Goodrich from 1997, the side engines are replaced by more efficient, quieter JT8D-217C/219, and the center engine gains a hush kit for $8.6 million (but loses the thrust reverser) (2000): fuel consumption is reduced by 10-12%, range and restricted airfield performance are improved.

==== Boeing C-22C ====
One 727-212 aircraft was operated by the US Air Force.

=== Proposed ===
727-300

A proposed 169-seat version was developed in consultation with United Airlines in 1972, which initially expressed an interest in ordering 50 aircraft. Also, interest was shown from Indian Airlines for a one-class version with 180 seats. The fuselage would have been lengthened by 18 feet (5.5 m) and the undercarriage strengthened. The three engines would have been replaced by two more powerful JT8D-217 engines under the T tail. Many cockpit components would have been in common with the 737-200 and improved engine management systems would have eliminated the need for the flight engineer. United did not proceed with its order and Indian Airlines instead ordered the larger Airbus A300, so the project was cancelled in 1976.

==== 727-400 ====
A concept with a 155-foot (47 m) fuselage and two high-bypass turbofan engines under the wings (but retaining the T tail) was proposed in 1977. More compact systems, a redesign of the internal space, and removing the need for the flight engineer would have increased the capacity to 189 seats in a two-class configuration. After only a few months, the concept was developed into the Boeing 7N7 design, which eventually became the Boeing 757.

=== Other variants ===
Faw-727

This Boeing 727 was reportedly modified by Iraq in early 1988 to serve as an ELINT platform. It was used during the invasion of Kuwait and Operation Desert Shield.

=== Comparison of variants ===
Below is a list of major differences between the 727 variants.

Variant	727-100	727-200	727-200 Advanced
Passenger capacity	125	155	
Length	133 ft 2 in (40.59 m)	153 ft 2 in (46.69 m)	
Height	34 ft 3 in (10.44 m)	34 ft 11 in (10.64 m)	
MTOW	169,000 lb (77,000 kg)	172,000 lb (78,000 kg)	209,500 lb (95,000 kg)
OEW	87,696 lb (39,778 kg)	97,650 lb (44,290 kg)	100,700 lb (45,700 kg)
Fuel capacity	7,680 US gal (29,100 L; 6,390 imp gal)	8,090 US gal (30,600 L; 6,740 imp gal)	10,585 US gal (40,070 L; 8,814 imp gal)
Engines ×3	Pratt & Whitney JT8D-1/7/9	JT8D-7/9/11	JT8D-9/15/17/17R
Thrust ×3	14,000–14,500 lbf (62–64 kN)	14,000–15,000 lbf (62–67 kN)	14,500–17,400 lbf (64–77 kN)
Range (Note: Two-class passengers)	2,250 nmi (4,170 km; 2,590 mi)	1,900 nmi (3,500 km; 2,200 mi)	2,550 nmi (4,720 km; 2,930 mi)
Take-off (Note: MTOW, SL, ISA)	8,300 ft (2,500 m)	8,400 ft (2,600 m)	10,100 ft (3,100 m)
Cruise speed	495–518 kn (917–959 km/h; 570–596 mph)	467–515 kn (865–954 km/h; 537–593 mph)	

== Operators ==
=== Current operators ===
==== Commercial operators ====
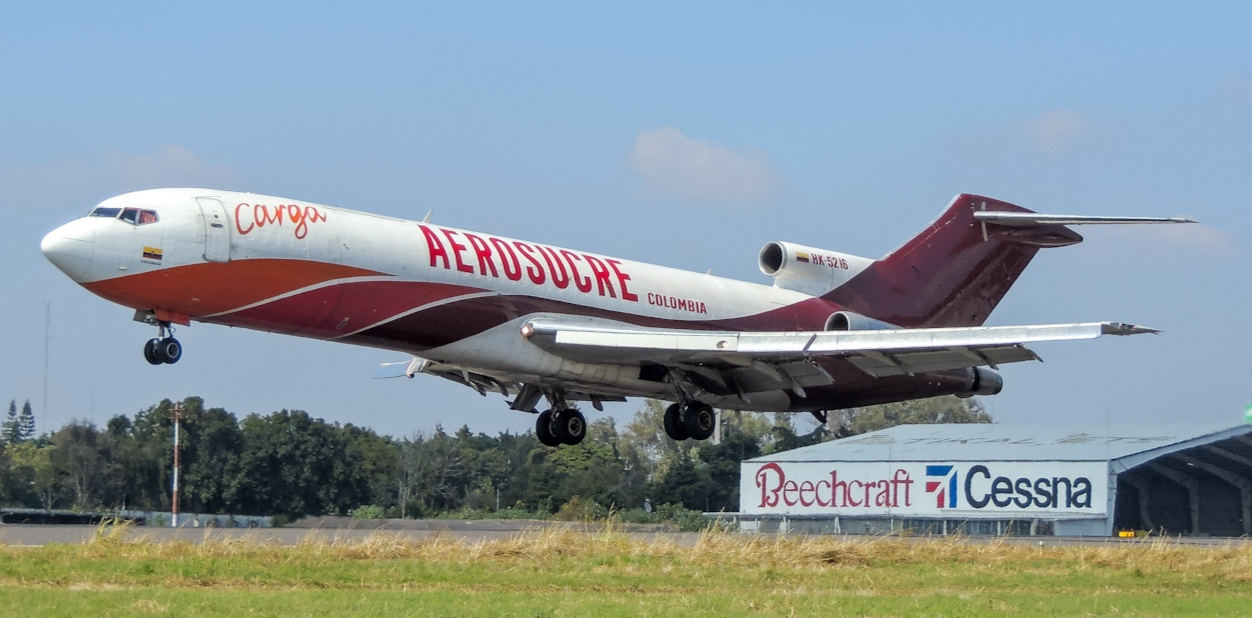
Aerosucre was one of the few remaining commercial operators of the 727 until December 12, 2025 when the last unit was damaged at Ernesto Cortissoz in Barranquilla. Pictured here is a 727-200(F) in 2018.

As of January 2026, Boeing 727s were in commercial service, operated by the following companies:

Kenya

- Safe Air Company (3 - 5Y-GMA, 5Y-JIB and one delivered from Kyrgyzstan as EX-27011)

United States

- IFL Group (2 - N215WE, N216WE)
- USA Jet Airlines (2 - N726US, N727US)

Uruguay

- Air Class Lineas Aereas (2 - CX-CLC, CX-CAR)

Venezuela

- Solar Cargo (2 - YV665T, YV668T)

==== Government, military, and other operators ====
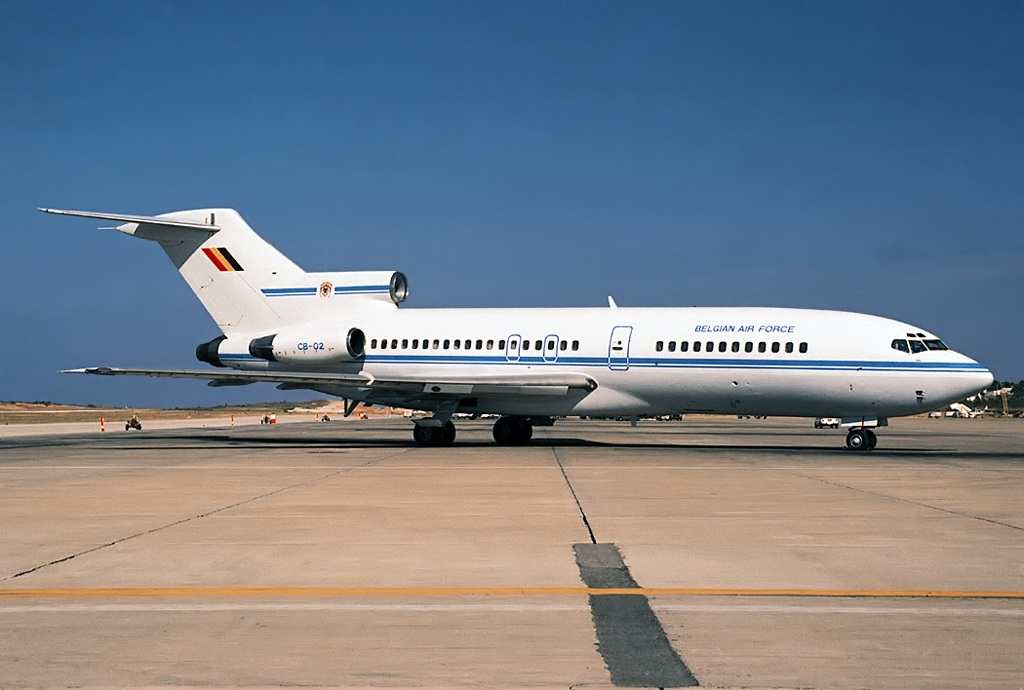
A 727-100 of the Belgian Air Force in 1988

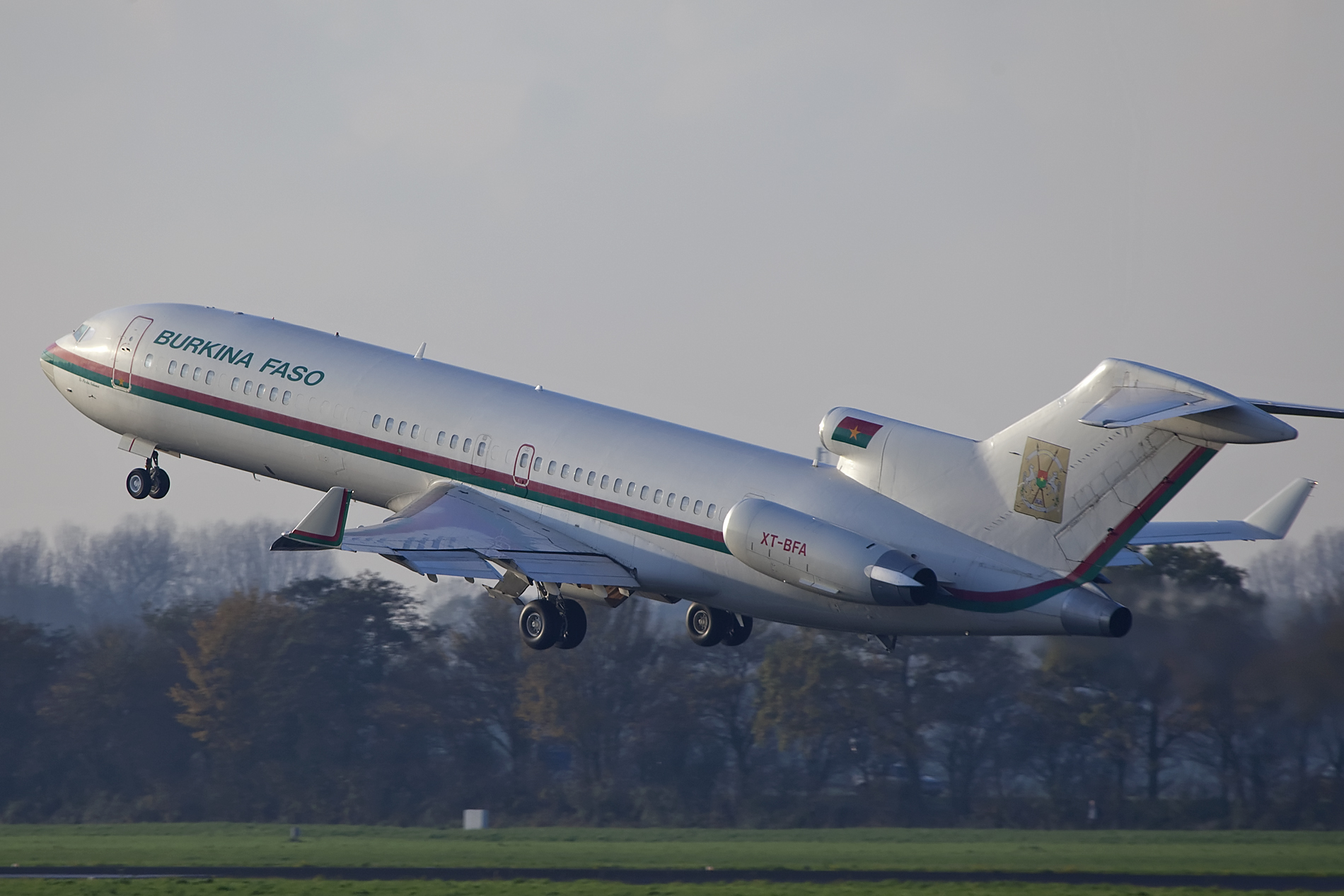
XT-BFA of the Burkina Faso Government departing Rotterdam The Hague Airport in 2011.

In addition, the 727 is used by the following military operators and corporations as of 2026.

United Kingdom

- Oil Spill Response (2 - G-OSRA, G-OSRB, operated by 2Excel Aviation)

United States

- RTX Corporation (1 - N289MT,)
- Zero Gravity Corporation (1 - N794AJ, operated by Everts Air)

==== Private aircraft ====
A number of 727s have been outfitted for use as private aircraft, especially since the early 1990s, when major airlines began to eliminate older 727-100 models from their fleet. Future U.S. President Donald Trump traveled in a former American Airlines 727-100 with a dining room, a bedroom, and shower facilities known as Trump Force One before upgrading to a larger Boeing 757 in 2009; Peter Nygård acquired a 727-100 for private use in 2005. American financier and convicted sex offender Jeffrey Epstein owned a private 727 nicknamed the "Lolita Express".

=== Orders and deliveries ===
Year	Total	1984	1983	1982	1981	1980	1979	1978	1977	1976	1975	1974	1973
Orders	1,831	0	1	11	38	68	98	125	133	113	50	88	92
Deliveries	1,831	8	11	26	94	131	136	118	67	61	91	91	92

Year	1972	1971	1970	1969	1968	1967	1966	1965	1964	1963	1962	1961	1960
Orders	119	26	48	64	66	125	149	187	83	20	10	37	80
Deliveries	41	33	55	114	160	155	135	111	95	6	0	0	

Source: Data from Boeing, through the end of production

Boeing 727 orders and deliveries (cumulative, by year):

Orders Deliveries

==== Model summary ====
Model Series	ICAO code	Orders	Deliveries
727-100	B721/R721 (Note: R721/R722 refers to Super 27 variants.)	407	407
727-100C	B721	164	164
727-200	B722	1245	1245
727-200F	B722/R722	15	15
Total		1831	1831

Source: Boeing

== Accidents and incidents ==
As of March 2024, a total of 353 incidents involving 727s had occurred, including 120 hull-loss accidents resulting in a total of 4,211 fatalities. The deadliest incident involving the 727 was Mexicana Flight 940 which took place on March 31, 1986, with 167 fatalities.

== Aircraft on display ==
A large number of surviving retired 727s remain, largely as a result of donation by FedEx of 84 of them to various institutions. The vast majority of the aircraft was given to university aviation maintenance programs. All but seven are located within the United States. Notable aircraft include:

Brazil

- PP-BLR – A 727-200 series (S/N 21661) preserved as the "Metaverse Aircraft Monument" at a square in Ipiabas, Barra do Piraí, Rio de Janeiro.
- PP-VLD – A 727 waiting for restoration to be preserved at the Boulevard Varig Vive. The aircraft is temporally situated near the RS-235 highway in Nova Petrópolis, Rio Grande do Sul.
- PP-IOG and PP-RLJ – Two Boeing 727-200 series preserved near a gas station in Regente Feijó, São Paulo.

=== Colombia ===
- HK-3480X – A 727-200 series aircraft in the experimental "Avianca Lite" livery is preserved and on display at the Salitre Mágico amusement park in Bogotá, Colombia.
- HK-4607 – A 727-200 series cargo aircraft (formerly registered N901RF) is permanently stored and preserved at El Dorado International Airport (BOG) in Bogotá, Colombia, following its retirement from Selva Colombia in early 2016. The aircraft was previously stored at Kingman Airport (IGM) in Arizona, United States, from 2001 to 2008 under the ownership of Kitty Hawk Aircargo before being sold to Colombian operators.

=== Denmark ===
- G-BNNI Lady Patricia – 727-276 was last flown by Sabre Airways in 2000. Purchased by 727 Communications, an advertising company in Skanderborg, Denmark, it now serves as a conference room and billboard at their offices.

=== Ethiopia ===
- C5-DMB – 727-228 (S/N 20411) was last operated by Mahfooz Aviation and Trans Air Congo (TAC). It was retired and stored at Addis Ababa Bole International Airport in Addis Ababa, where it was later scrapped.
- C5-SBM – 727-256 originally operated by Iberia as EC-DCC, and later by Mahfooz Aviation and Sudan Airways. It was retired and stored at Addis Ababa Bole International Airport in Addis Ababa, where it was later scrapped
- C5-SMM – 727-251 (S/N 19973) was originally delivered to Northwest Orient Airlines (later Northwest Airlines) as N254US, and later served with Pan Am (as N386PA) before its final operations with Mahfooz Aviation. It was retired and stored at Addis Ababa Bole International Airport in Addis Ababa, where it was later scrapped.

=== France ===
- N166FE Bud - 727-100F is on static display at Musée de l'air et de l'espace in Le Bourget, France. It was formerly operated by FedEx and donated to the museum in 2007.

=== Greece ===
- SX-CBA, the first Boeing 727 delivered for Olympic Airways, is preserved at the Sourmena Stadium in Elliniko.

=== Costa Rica ===
- HK-3133X – 727-44 preserved intact at Hotel Costa Verde near Quepos, Costa Rica. Originally operated by South African Airways and later by Avianca, the airframe was salvaged from where it lay abandoned at Juan Santamaría International Airport in San José, transported to the jungle canopy near Manuel Antonio National Park, and converted into a two-bedroom luxury hotel suite.

=== Malaysia ===
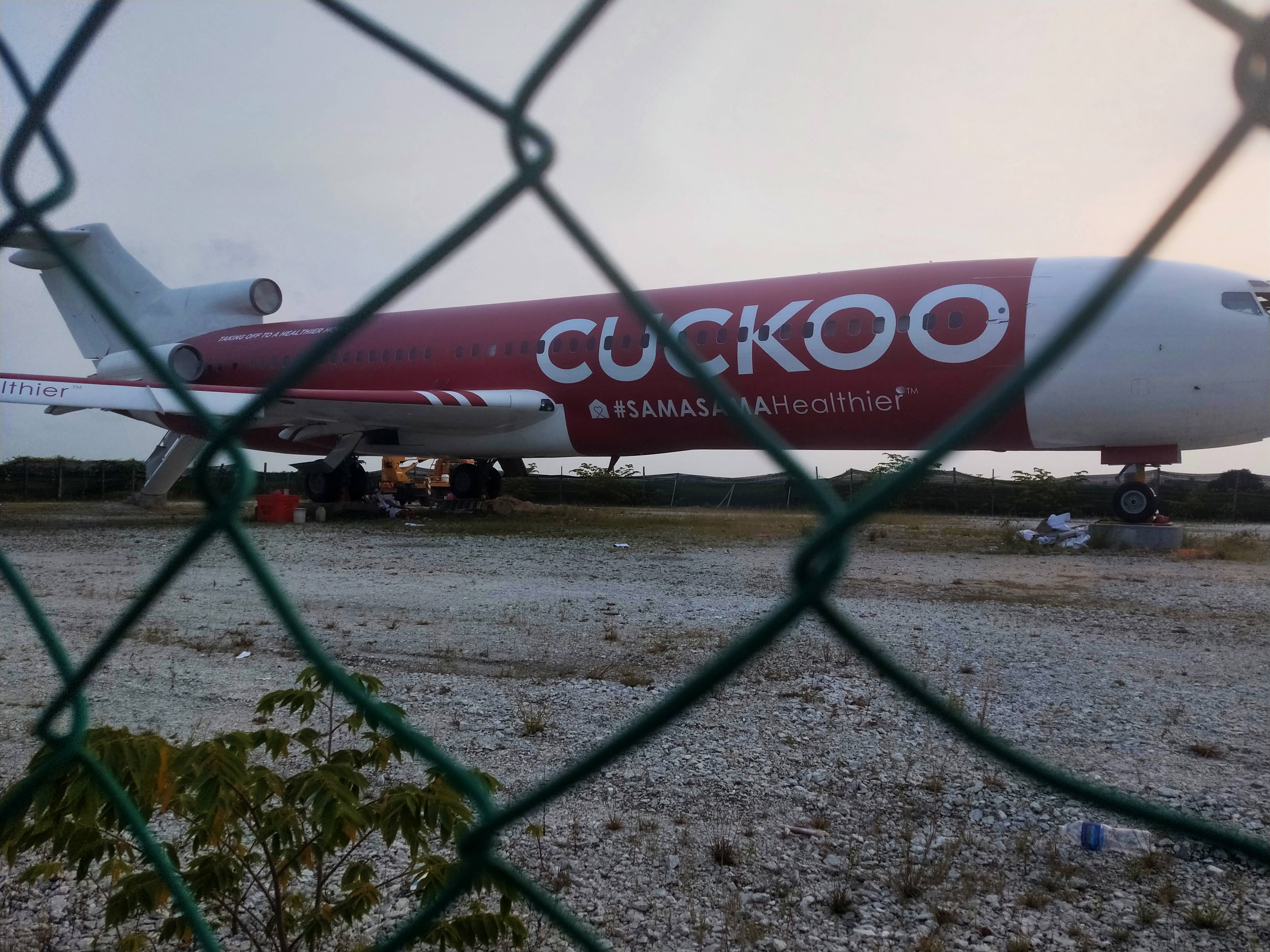
A displayed Boeing 727 painted in Cuckoo Electronics livery

- 9M-NEP - Formerly operated by Gading Sari Aviation Services, now preserved as Terminal Sekinchan in Sekinchan, Selangor, Malaysia.

=== Mexico ===
- XC-FPA – 727-264/Adv, last operated by the Mexican Federal Police, is on display in Parque Tangamanga, San Luis Potosí City, Mexico.

=== Austria ===
- 3D-JJM (c/n 20053) – A Boeing 727-231 formerly operated by Trans World Airlines (TWA) and later as a private sports team charter jet ("Sport Hawk"). In 2018, it was moved to Graz, where it was placed on the roof of the Novapark Flugzeughotel and converted into a restaurant attraction.

=== Spain ===
- EC-CFG – 727-256 forward fuselage section only preserved at the Museo del Aire in Madrid.

=== Thailand ===
- HS-TCC – A Boeing 727-200 formerly operated by Thai Airways International, is preserved and displayed as a converted commercial aviation monument and restaurant attraction in Bangkok.

=== United Kingdom ===
- VP-CMN "PYTCHAir" - 727-46 is located in Bristol, UK, and was purchased by technology investor Johnny Palmer for his media company PYTCH. The fuselage is resting atop a series of shipping containers and was transported in February 2021.

=== United States ===
- N7001U – 727-022 is on static display at the Museum of Flight in Seattle, Washington. It was the first 727 completed. It departed from Paine Field in Everett, Washington, and landed at the museum on March 2, 2016.
- N7004U – 727-022 is in storage at the Pima Air & Space Museum in Tucson, Arizona. It was the first 727 delivered to a customer and the first to make a commercial flight.
- N7017U – 727 is on static display at the Museum of Science and Industry in Chicago, Illinois. It was donated by United Airlines. It features cutaway sections showing airplane framework and lavatory, cockpit view, and a few rows of seating.
- N874AA – 727-223 was operated by American Airlines and previously held in the collection of the Museum of Flight. Although signed over to the National Airline History Museum in 2016 for preservation, the project suffered financial difficulties, and the airframe was subsequently seized and scrapped at Boeing Field in November 2021
- N90557 (later N113) – 727-30 (S/N 18935) is in storage at El Paso International Airport in El Paso, Texas. It was originally operated by Lufthansa and later by the United States Marshals Service under the Justice Prisoner and Alien Transportation System (JPATS). Following a public auction in January 2025, it is being preserved by local buyers for use as an educational and flight simulation space.
- N176AP – 727-284 preserved intact in a private wooded lot near Hillsboro, Oregon. Originally operated by Olympic Airways as SX-CBA, the aircraft was salvaged from where it lay abandoned at Ellinikon International Airport in Athens, Greece, and was purchased by a retired electrical engineer in 1999 and converted into a private residence.
- N186FE – 727-100 is on static display at Owens Community College in Perrysburg, Ohio. It formerly was operated by FedEx and donated by the company in 2007.
- N199FE – 727-173C is on static display at the Kansas Aviation Museum in Wichita, Kansas. It was formerly operated by FedEx as N199FE.
- N113FE Jarrod – 727-022C is in storage at the National Museum of Commercial Aviation in Atlanta, Georgia. It was formerly operated by FedEx as N113FE, and by United Airlines before that as N7437U.

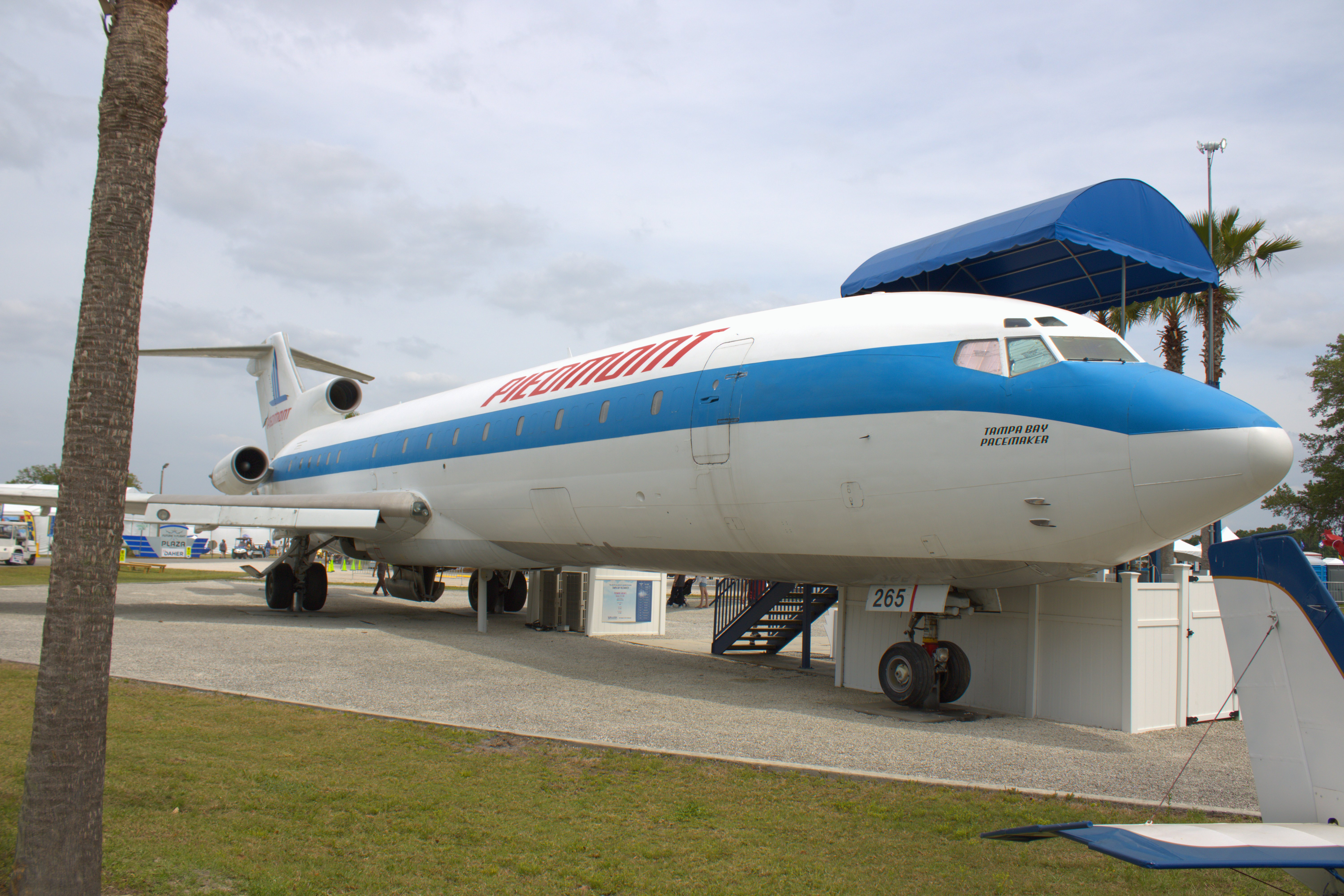
N265FE Paul – 727-227F is on static display at the Florida Air Museum in Lakeland, Florida. The aircraft's interior has been converted into an interactive STEM classroom, providing hands-on educational displays for students.

- N265FE Paul – 727-227F is on static display at the Florida Air Museum in Lakeland, Florida. It was formerly operated by Air Canada and FedEx. The aircraft's interior has been converted into an interactive STEM classroom, providing hands-on educational displays for students.
- N466FE Darrell – 727-225F is on static display as an instructional training aid at Memphis International Airport in Memphis, Tennessee. It was formerly operated by FedEx Express and donated to the Aviation Academy at Memphis in 2006.
- N492FE Two Bears – 727-227F is on static display at FLY8MA in Big Lake, Alaska. It was transported from Anchorage, Alaska to The FLY8MA Pilot Lodge in April 2023, and converted into an airplane home.
- N242FE Brittney – 727-277F is on static display with only its nose section intact at the Museum of Flying in Santa Monica, California; it was donated by FedEx after retirement, and underwent a complete restoration in the fall of 2018.
- N149FE, a 727-22 (S/N 19807) manufactured in 1967, is on static display at Guilford Technical Community College (GTCC) in Greensboro, North Carolina. It was formerly used by the FedEx Express before being donated to TIMCO (now AAR Corp.) as a maintenance training aid before being donated to Guilford Technical Community College for use as a training aid for their Aircraft maintenance technician program.

== Specifications (Boeing 727-100 with JT8D-7) ==
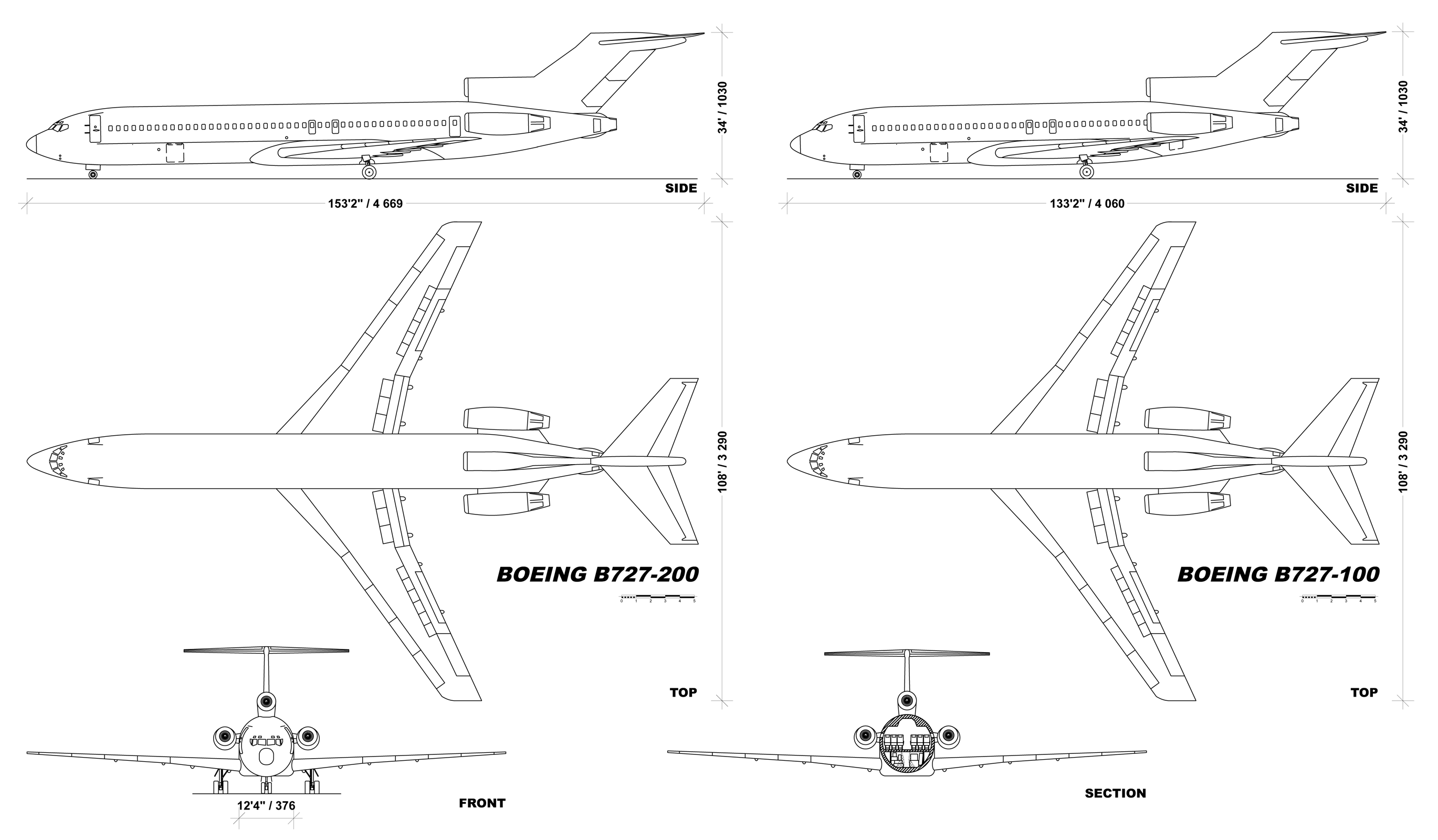
A comparison of the different 727 variants

Data from

General characteristics

- Crew: 3
- Capacity: 106 passengers in two classes, 125 in one class
- Length: 133 ft 2 in (40.59 m)
- Wingspan: 108 ft 0 in (32.92 m)
- Width: 11 ft 8 in (3.56 m) (cabin)
- Height: 34 ft 3 in (10.44 m)
- Wing area: 1,650 sq ft (153 m^{2})
- Empty weight: 87,696 lb (39,778 kg)
- Max takeoff weight: 169,000 lb (76,657 kg)
- Fuel capacity: 7,680 US gal (29,100 L; 6,390 imp gal)
- Powerplant: 3 × Pratt & Whitney JT8D-7 turbofan engine, 14,000 lbf (62 kN) thrust each

Performance

- Maximum speed: 632 mph (1,017 km/h, 549 kn)
- Maximum speed: Mach 0.9
- Cruise speed: 600 mph (960 km/h, 518 kn)
- Range: 2,590 mi (4,170 km, 2,250 nmi)
- Takeoff distance: 8,300 ft (2,500 m)

== See also ==
- 2012 Boeing 727 crash experiment
- Notable appearances in media

Related development

- Boeing 707
- Boeing 737
- Boeing 7J7
- Boeing 757

Aircraft of comparable role, configuration, and era

- Hawker Siddeley Trident
- BAC One-Eleven
- McDonnell Douglas DC-9
- Tupolev Tu-154

Related lists

- List of civil aircraft
- List of jet airliners
