= Pytchair =

Boeing 727 aircraft

Coordinates: 51°26′11″N 2°32′10″W

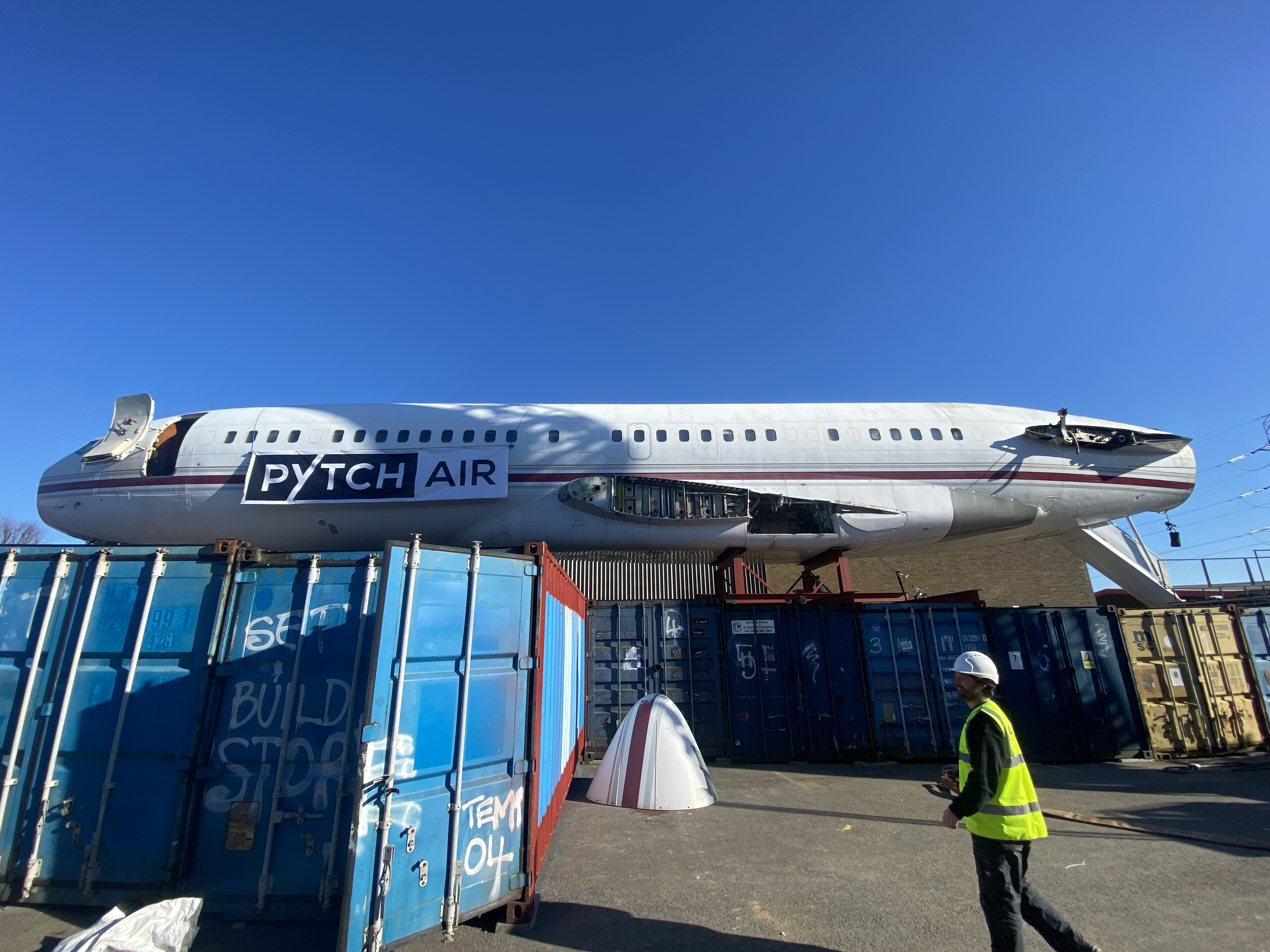
- PYTCHAir resting on containers

General information
- Type: Boeing 727-46
- Manufacturer: Boeing
- Construction number: 19282/495

History
- Manufactured: 1967
- First flight: 13 November 1967
- In service: 1967 - 2015
- Preserved at: Bonville Road, Brislington
- Fate: Broken up in 2015; fuselage preserved

PYTCHAir is the name given to a Boeing 727 located in the Brislington area of Bristol. The aircraft was originally a Japan Airlines passenger aircraft which first flew in 1968. It was converted into a private jet and operated by various owners including LarMag Aviation.

VP-CMN at Cotswold Airport in July 2019, before it was moved to Bristol

The fuselage at Cotswold Airport in February 2021 after the first move attempt was postponed because of waterlogged ground

The fuselage on a low-loader during the 27 February 2021 journey

The fuselage being lifted onto shipping containers at Bonville Road on 28 February 2021

It was purchased in 2020 to be used as an office. Bristol City Council granted planning permission for the installation in October 2020. The relocation was delayed until February 2021, when it was transported by road to Bonville Road, Brislington. A first attempt to move the fuselage by road at the end of January 2021 had been postponed because wet weather had left the ground at Cotswold Airport too soft. The fuselage left the airport on 27 February 2021 and was lifted by crane onto shipping containers at the Bonville Road site the following day. As of November 2021, the fuselage is on display and used as an office, filming location and is available for charity events. It has been featured as a “quirky" and "cool" office.

The nose of the fuselage after the March 2022 mural by Harriet Wood, Curtis Hylton and Hasan Kamil

In March 2022 the fuselage was covered in street art by Bristol street artists Harriet Wood, Curtis Hylton and Hasan Kamil. The art work drew media attention.

In early 2024 it was added to Airbnb and has been referred to as the "coolest" and "wildest" property on the platform by various media outlets.

In January 2025 it was widely reported that the aircraft had been owned and used by Pablo Escobar.

== Interior ==
Lounge seating and windows of the 1981-era VIP interior

The flight engineer's panel on the preserved flight deck

The aft VIP suite as found in July 2019

The 727's built-in rear airstair
